= Cheeseborough, Queensland =

Cheeseborough
- Suburb
- Interactive map of Cheeseborough
- Coordinates: 22.7966°S 147.8589°E
- Country: Australia
- State: Queensland
- LGA: Central Highlands Region
- Location: 18.4 km (11.4 mi) SE of Clermont; 90.9 km (56.5 mi) NNW of Emerald; 362 km (225 mi) WNW of Rockhampton; 925 km (575 mi) NW of Brisbane

Government
  - State electorate: Gregory
  - Federal division: Flynn

Area
  - Total: 195.7 km^{2} (75.6 sq mi)

Population
  - Total: 16 (2021 census)
  - Density: 0.0818/km^{2} (0.212/sq mi)
- Time zone: UTC+10:00 (AEST)
- Postcode: 4702
Suburbs around Cheeseborough
Clermont	Wolfang	Dysart
Clermont	Cheeseborough	Retro
Theresa Creek	Hibernia	Retro

Cheeseborough is a rural locality in the Central Highlands Region, Queensland, Australia. In the 2021 census, Cheeseborough had a population of 16 people.

== Geography ==
The Gregory Highway and the Central Western railway line pass through the south-west of the locality from Hibernia to the south through to Clermont to the west.

Huntley Creek loosely bounds the locality to the west and the Peak Range to the north-east with Anvil Peak (22.6736°S 148.0147°E) rising to 737 metres (2,418 ft) above sea level.

Top Knot Hill (22.8833°S 147.75°E) lies between the railway line and the highway in the south-west of the locality.

A small area in the north-east is within the Peak Range National Park, which extends into neighbouring Wolfang and Dysart. There is some cropping in the south-west, but the predominant land use is grazing on native vegetation.

== History ==
The Cheeseborough area is described in 1865 as being the nearest permanent water supply to Clermont and 7 miles away.

== Demographics ==
In the 2016 census, Cheeseborough had a population of 3 people.

In the 2021 census, Cheeseborough had a population of 16 people.

== Education ==
There are no schools in Cheeseborough. The nearest government primary schools are Clermont State School in neighbouring Clermont to the west, Capella State School in Capella to the south-east, and Dysart State School in neighbouring Dysart to the north-east. The nearest government primary schools are Clermont State High School in Clermont, Capella State High School in Capella, and Dysart State High School in Dysart.

There is also a Catholic primary school in Clermont.
