= Acacia castorum =

Scientific classification
- Kingdom: Plantae
- Clade: Tracheophytes
- Clade: Angiosperms
- Clade: Eudicots
- Clade: Rosids
- Order: Fabales
- Family: Fabaceae
- Subfamily: Caesalpinioideae
- Clade: Mimosoid clade
- Genus: Acacia
- Species: A. castorum

Binomial name
- Acacia castorum Pedley

Species of legume

Acacia castorum, commonly known as Peak Range wattle, is a species of flowering plant in the family Fabaceae and is endemic to the Gemini Mountains in central-eastern Queensland, Australia. It is a shrub with narrowly egg-shaped phyllodes with the narrower end towards the base, spherical heads of 20 to 25 flowers, and leathery pods up to 30 mm (1.2 in) long.

== Description ==
Acacia castorum is a shrub that typically grows to a height of up to 3 m (9.8 ft) and has few branchlets that are covered with hairs pressed against the surface. Its phyllodes are narrowly egg-shaped with the narrower end towards the base, 5–9 mm (0.20–0.35 in) long, 1.5–2.4 mm (0.059–0.094 in) wide with a small point near the end, and narrowly triangular stipules 0.4–1 mm (0.016–0.039 in) long at the base. The flowers are borne in axils in spherical heads on a peduncle 10–12 mm (0.39–0.47 in) long, each head with 20 to 25 flowers. The pods are leathery, up to about 30 mm (1.2 in) long and 8 mm (0.31 in) wide with a powdery white bloom containing up to 8 shiny black seeds 4.3–5.0 mm (0.17–0.20 in) long and 3.0–3.3 mm (0.12–0.13 in) wide with a club-shaped aril.

== Taxonomy ==
Acacia castorum was first formally described in 2019 by Leslie Pedley in the journal Austrobaileya from specimens collected on Mount Castor in the Peak Range National Park in 2001. The specific epithet (castorum) alludes to the half twins Castor and Pollux, or the mountains named after them.

== Distribution and habitat ==
This species of wattle is only known from Gemini Mountains in the Peak Range National Park in central-eastern Queensland, where it grows on cliff lines and steep slopes of trachyte in open woodland.

== Conservation status ==
Acacia castorum is listed as "vulnerable" under the Queensland Government Nature Conservation Act 1992.

== See also ==
- List of Acacia species
