= Lowestoff, Queensland =

Lowestoff
- Suburb
- Interactive map of Lowestoff
- Coordinates: 22.8366°S 148.085°E
- Country: Australia
- State: Queensland
- LGA: Central Highlands Region
- Location: 24.7 km (15.3 mi) NNE of Capella; 52.6 km (32.7 mi) SW of Dysart; 76.6 km (47.6 mi) N of Emerald; 347 km (216 mi) WNW of Rockhampton; 908 km (564 mi) NW of Brisbane

Government
  - State electorate: Gregory
  - Federal division: Flynn

Area
  - Total: 291.3 km^{2} (112.5 sq mi)

Population
  - Total: 36 (2021 census)
  - Density: 0.1236/km^{2} (0.320/sq mi)
- Time zone: UTC+10:00 (AEST)
- Postcode: 4723
Suburbs around Lowestoff
Retro	Dysart	Cotherstone
Retro	Lowestoff	Mount Macarthur
Retro	Khosh Bulduk	Khosh Bulduk

Lowestoff is a rural locality in the Central Highlands Region, Queensland, Australia. In the 2021 census, Lowestoff had a population of 36 people.

== Geography ==
Cotherstone Road enters the locality from the south (Khosh Bulduk) and exit to the north (Dysart). It is the main route through the locality. Despite the name, the road does not enter neighbouring Cotherstone to the north-east.

The land use is a mixture of crop growing and grazing on native vegetation.

Lowestoff has the following mountains:

- Little Peak (22.7887°S 148.1482°E) rising to 458 metres (1,503 ft) above sea level
- Calvert Peak (22.8111°S 148.1705°E) 634 metres (2,080 ft)

== Demographics ==
In the 2016 census, Lowestoff had a population of 32 people.

In the 2021 census, Lowestoff had a population of 36 people.

== Education ==
There are no schools in Lowestoff. The nearest government primary schools are Capella State School in Capella to the south and Dysart State School in neighbouring Dysart to the north-east. The nearest government secondary schools are Capella State High School in Capella to the south and Dysart State High School in Dysart to the north-east.
