= Lilyvale =

Lilyvale may refer to:

== Australia ==
- Lilyvale, New South Wales
  - Lilyvale railway station
- Lilyvale, Queensland (Central Highlands Region)
- Lilyvale, Queensland (Toowoomba Region)
- Lilyvale, The Rocks, a heritage-house in Sydney, New South Wales
- Lilyvale Important Bird Area, Queensland

== United Kingdom ==
- Lilyvale, Kent, England

== See also ==
- Lilyvale Stand Monument, Crinum, Queensland
