= Theresa Creek =

Theresa Creek may refer to:

- Theresa Creek, Queensland, a locality in the Central Highlands Region, Australia
- Clermont, Queensland, town in Central Highlands Region, Australia, formerly known as Theresa Creek
