= Chirnside (disambiguation) =

Chirnside can refer to:

== Places ==
- Chirnside, a village in the Scottish Borders of Scotland
- Chirnside, Queensland, Australia, a rural locality
- Chirnside Park, a suburb of Melbourne, Australia

== People ==
Notable people with this surname include:

- Anne Chirnside (born 1954), Australian rower
- Thomas Chirnside (1815–1887), Scottish-born pastoralist in Australia
