= Carbine Creek, Queensland =

Carbine Creek
- Suburb
- Interactive map of Carbine Creek
- Coordinates: 23.1508°S 147.7969°E
- Country: Australia
- State: Queensland
- LGA: Central Highlands Region
- Location: 34.2 km (21.3 mi) SW of Capella; 91.5 km (56.9 mi) S of Clermont; 86.1 km (53.5 mi) NW of Emerald; 357 km (222 mi) W of Rockhampton; 918 km (570 mi) NW of Brisbane

Government
  - State electorate: Gregory
  - Federal division: Flynn

Area
  - Total: 561.1 km^{2} (216.6 sq mi)

Population
  - Total: 33 (2021 census)
  - Density: 0.0588/km^{2} (0.1523/sq mi)
- Time zone: UTC+10:00 (AEST)
- Postcode: 4723
Suburbs around Carbine Creek
Theresa Creek	Hibernia	Hibernia
Theresa Creek	Carbine Creek	Hibernia
Argyll	Rubyvale	Fork Lagoons

Carbine Creek is a rural locality in the Central Highlands Region, Queensland, Australia. In the 2021 census, Carbine Creek had a population of 33 people.

== Geography ==
The Capella Rubyvale Road enters the locality from the east (Hiberinia) and exits to the south-west (Rubyvale).

Kettle State Forest is in the south-west of the locality and Llandillo State Forest is in the south-east of the locality. Apart from these protected areas, the land use is grazing on native vegetation.

== Demographics ==
In the 2016 census, Carbine Creek had a population of 23 people.

In the 2021 census, Carbine Creek had a population of 33 people.

== Education ==
There are no schools in Carbine Creek. The nearest government primary schools are Capella State School in Capella to the east, Anakie State School in Anakie Siding to the south, and Clermont State School in Clermont to the north-west. The nearest government secondary schools are Capella State High School in Capella and Clermont State High School in Clermont.
