= Crinum, Queensland =

Crinum
- Suburb
- Interactive map of Crinum
- Coordinates: 23.2036°S 148.2683°E
- Country: Australia
- State: Queensland
- LGA: Central Highlands Region
- Location: 34.9 km (21.7 mi) NNE of Emerald; 44.2 km (27.5 mi) SE of Capella; 304 km (189 mi) W of Rockhampton; 867 km (539 mi) NW of Brisbane

Government
  - State electorate: Gregory
  - Federal division: Flynn

Area
  - Total: 502.1 km^{2} (193.9 sq mi)

Population
  - Total: 86 (2021 census)
  - Density: 0.1713/km^{2} (0.4436/sq mi)
- Time zone: UTC+10:00 (AEST)
- Postcode: 4723
Suburbs around Crinum
Belcong	Belcong	Lilyvale
Chirnside	Crinum	Lilyvale
Gordonstone	Wyuna	Wyuna

Crinum is a rural locality in the Central Highlands Region, Queensland, Australia. In the 2021 census, Crinum had a population of 86 people.

== Geography ==
The Kestrel coal mine is located in the locality (23.2574°S 148.3006°E). It produced both thermal and coking coal. The mine has an estimated 50 to 100 megatonnes of coal. It is part of the Kestrel coal reserve which spreads across Crinum and extends into neighbouring Lilyvale, Wyuna and Gordonstone, which has an estimated 100 to 500 megatonnes of coal.

Although there are a number of the mines in the area, the predominant land use is grazing and cropping.

== History ==
Gregory Mine State School opened on 10 July 1978 but closed on 14 December 1979.

Following the dismissal of a group of mine workers from the Gordonstone Coal Mine (later renamed by Rio Tinto to Kestral Coal Mine), the workers maintained a protest line from early October 1997 to August 1999, becoming Australia's longest running black coal labour dispute. In 1998 they erected a monument to the protest (the Lilyvale Stand Monument).

== Demographics ==
In the 2016 census, Crinum had a population of 86 people.

In the 2021 census, Crinum had a population of 86 people.

== Heritage listings ==
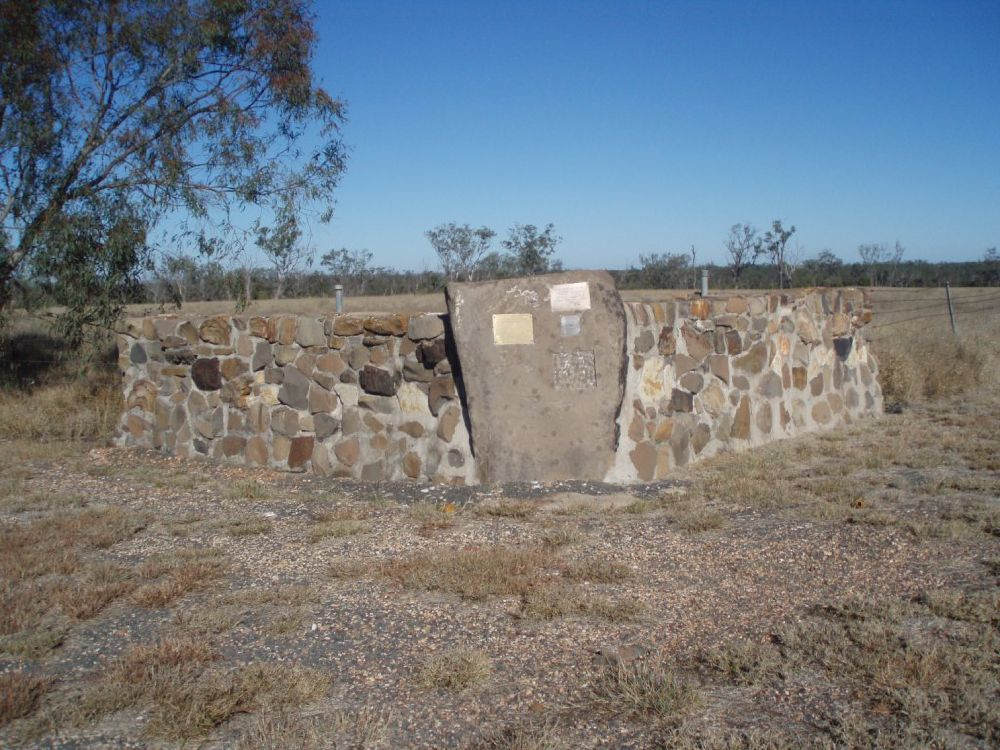
Lilyvale Stand Monument, 2009

Crinum has a number of heritage-listed sites, including:

- Lilyvale Road (23.2118°S 148.3483°E): Lilyvale Stand Monument

== Education ==
There are no schools in Crinum. The nearest government primary schools are Capella State School in Capella to the north-west and Emerald North State School in Emerald to the south. The nearest government secondary schools are Capella State High School in Capella and Emerald State High School in Emerald.
