= Kestrel coal mine =

Mine in Queensland, Australia

Kestrel Coal Mine
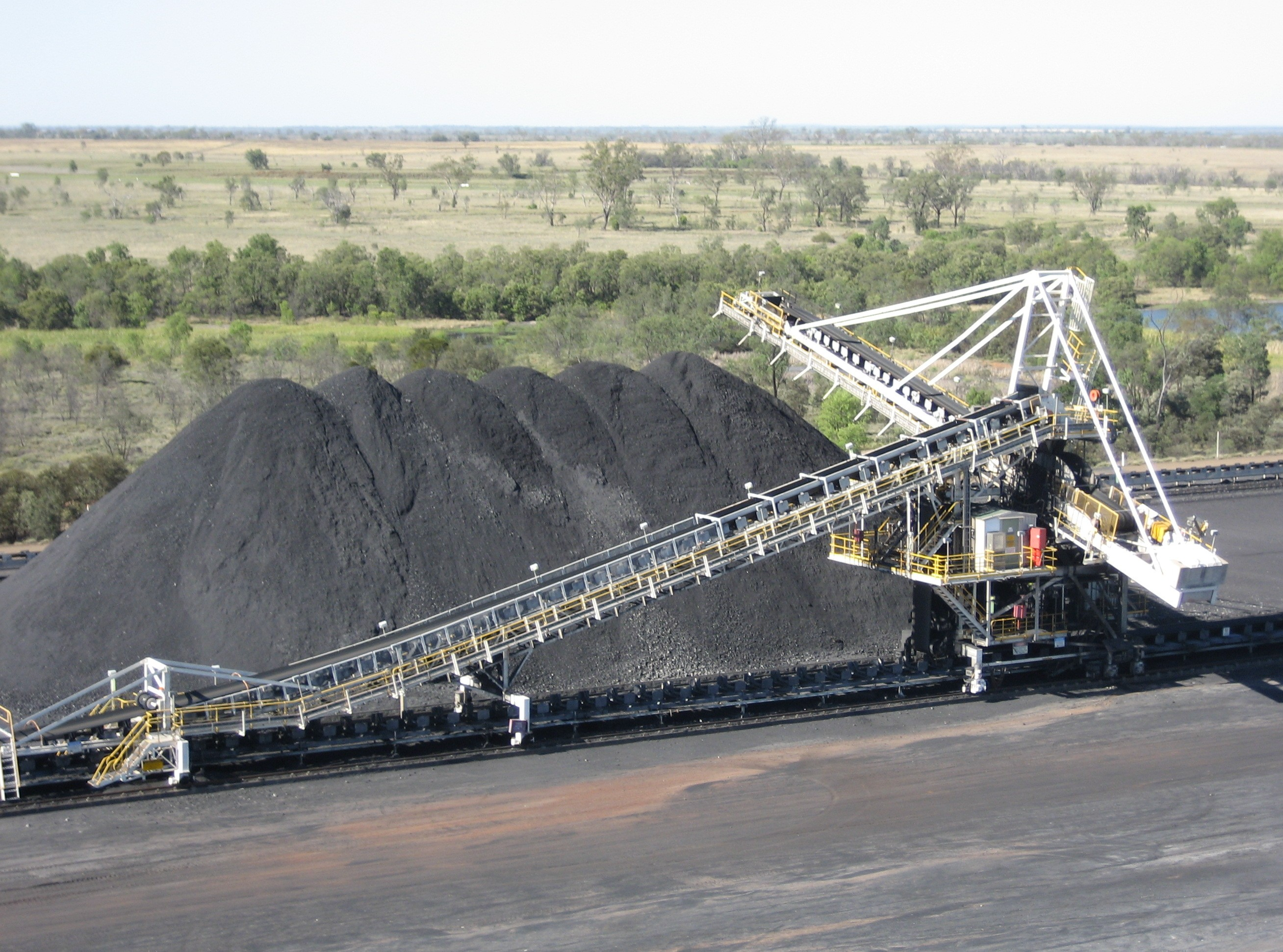
- Krupp coal stacker at Kestrel Mine, 2007

- Location within Queensland
- Location: 51 km northeast of Emerald, Queensland, Australia; 23°14′9″S 148°21′59″E
- Products: Coking coal, thermal coal
- Opened: 1992
- Company: Kestrel Joint Venture (Queensland Coal 80%, Mitsui 20%)

External videos
- Rio Tinto Coal Australia's Kestrel underground mine in Queensland

The Kestrel Coal Mine is an underground coal mine located in the Bowen Basin at Crinum, 51 km northeast of Emerald in Central Queensland, Australia. In 2013, the mine had coal reserves amounting to 158 million tonnes of coking coal, one of the largest reserves in Asia and the world.

In October 2013, the Kestrel South coal mine extension was opened, allowing for increased production of six million tonnes a year, and extending life of the mine by 20 years. During 2013 and 2014, mining operations at Kestrel North had been wound down.

Previously known as Gordonstone Mine, the Kestrel Mine is owned by the Kestrel Joint Venture, which comprises Kestrel Coal Resources (80%) and Mitsui Kestrel Coal Investment (20%). The mine had been managed by Rio Tinto Coal Australia until 2018, when they sold their share to Kestrel Coal Resources, and who took over management. Kestrel Coal Resources is itself a joint venture between EMR Capital (52%) and Indonesia's Adaro Energy(48%). Also in 2018, Mitsui declined EMR's $US560 million offer for their 20% share in the Kestrel Joint Venture.

A 7.9 km overland conveyor is used to transfer coal from South Kestrel to the existing coal handling and preparation plant at North Kestrel. Coal is then transported by the Blackwater railway system to the Port of Gladstone for export. Customers are located throughout Asia and Europe, as well as Brazil, with the largest single market being India.

== Industrial dispute ==
The mine was the subject of a long-running workers' strike from October 1997 to August 1999, commemorated in the heritage-listed Lilyvale Stand Monument.

== See also ==
- Coal mining in Australia
- List of mines in Australia
- Rio Tinto Coal Australia
