= Fork Lagoons, Queensland =

Fork Lagoons
- Suburb
- Interactive map of Fork Lagoons
- Coordinates: 23.3450°S 147.9550°E
- Country: Australia
- State: Queensland
- LGA: Central Highlands Region
- Location: 40.8 km (25.4 mi) NNW of Emerald; 312 km (194 mi) W of Rockhampton; 367 km (228 mi) SW of Mackay; 932 km (579 mi) NNW of Brisbane

Government
  - State electorate: Gregory
  - Federal division: Flynn

Area
  - Total: 583.6 km^{2} (225.3 sq mi)

Population
  - Total: 33 (2021 census)
  - Density: 0.0565/km^{2} (0.1465/sq mi)
- Time zone: UTC+10:00 (AEST)
- Postcode: 4723
Suburbs around Fork Lagoons
Carbine Creek	Hibernia	Gordonstone
Argyll	Fork Lagoons	Wyuna
Rubyvale; Sapphire Central	Anakie Siding	Emerald

Fork Lagoons is a rural locality in the Central Highlands Region, Queensland, Australia. The postcode of Fork Lagoons is 4723. In the 2021 census, Fork Lagoons had a population of 33 people.

== Geography ==
Fork Lagoons is bounded to the north and east by Theresa Creek and Retreat Creek to the south.

Kingower Billabong is a billabong in the east of the locality (23.4°S 148.0666°E).

There are a number of state forests within the locality: Crystal Creek State Forest, Kettle State Forest and Burn State Forest. Apart from these, the land use is predominantly grazing on native vegetation with a small area of crop growing in the south-east of the locality.

== History ==
The locality was officially named and bounded on 16 June 2000.

== Demographics ==
In the 2016 census, Fork Lagoons had a population of 0 people.

In the 2021 census, Fork Lagoons had a population of 33 people.

== Education ==
There are no schools in Fork Lagoons. The nearest government primary schools are Anakie State School in neighbouring Anakie Siding to the south-west, Capella State School in Capella to the north, and Denison State School and Emerald North State School, both in neighbouring Emerald to the south-west. The nearest government secondary schools are Capella State High School in Capella and Emerald State High School in Emerald.
