= John Roper =

John Roper may refer to:

- John Roper, 1st Baron Teynham (died 1618), English nobleman
- John Roper, Baron Roper (1935–2016), British politician
- John Roper (American football) (born 1965), former American football linebacker
- John Roper (baseball) (born 1971), Major League Baseball pitcher
- John Roper (British diplomat), former British ambassador to Luxembourg
- John Roper (explorer) (c. 1822–1895), Australian explorer
- John Herbert Roper, American historian and author
- John W. Roper (1898–1963), Vice Admiral in the United States Navy
- John Charles Roper (1858–1940), Anglican bishop
