= Mount Macarthur, Queensland =

Mount Macarthur
- Suburb
- Interactive map of Mount Macarthur
- Coordinates: 22.9002°S 148.2144°E
- Country: Australia
- State: Queensland
- LGA: Central Highlands Region
- Location: 25.6 km (15.9 mi) NE of Capella; 77.6 km (48.2 mi) N of Emerald; 348 km (216 mi) WNW of Rockhampton; 910 km (570 mi) NNW of Brisbane

Government
  - State electorate: Gregory
  - Federal division: Flynn

Area
  - Total: 207.0 km^{2} (79.9 sq mi)

Population
  - Total: 31 (2021 census)
  - Density: 0.1498/km^{2} (0.388/sq mi)
- Time zone: UTC+10:00 (AEST)
- Postcode: 4723
Suburbs around Mount Macarthur
Lowestoff	Cotherstone	Cotherstone
Lowestoff	Mount Macarthur	Dysart
Khosh Bulduk	Belcong	Belcong

Mount Macarthur is a rural locality in the Central Highlands Region, Queensland, Australia. In the 2021 census, Mount Macarthur had a population of 31 people.

== Geography ==
Mount Macarthur has the following mountains (from north to south):

- Scotts Peak (22.8549°S 148.2198°E) 854 metres (2,802 ft)
- Ropers Peak (22.8669°S 148.2254°E) 804 metres (2,638 ft)
- Mount Macarthur (22.8687°S 148.1559°E) 746 metres (2,448 ft)
- Malvern Hill (22.8776°S 148.2268°E) 679 metres (2,228 ft)
- Mount Lowe (22.9055°S 148.1500°E) 491 metres (1,611 ft)

The land use is predominantly grazing on native vegetation with some crop growing.

== History ==
The mountain was named by explorer Ludwig Leichhardt on 27 January 1845, after botanist and farmer William Macarthur of Camden, New South Wales. Leichhart also named Ropers Peak after fellow explorer John Roper and Scotts Peak after pastoralist Helenus Scott from Glendon in the Hunter Valley, who had provided support for Leichhardt's expedition.

== Demographics ==
In the 2016 census, Mount Macarthur had a population of 16 people.

In the 2021 census, Mount Macarthur had a population of 31 people.

== Education ==
There are no schools in Mount Macarthur. The nearest government primary and secondary schools are Capella State School and Capella State High School, both in Capella to the south-west.
