= Gemini Mountains, Queensland =

Gemini Mountains
- Suburb
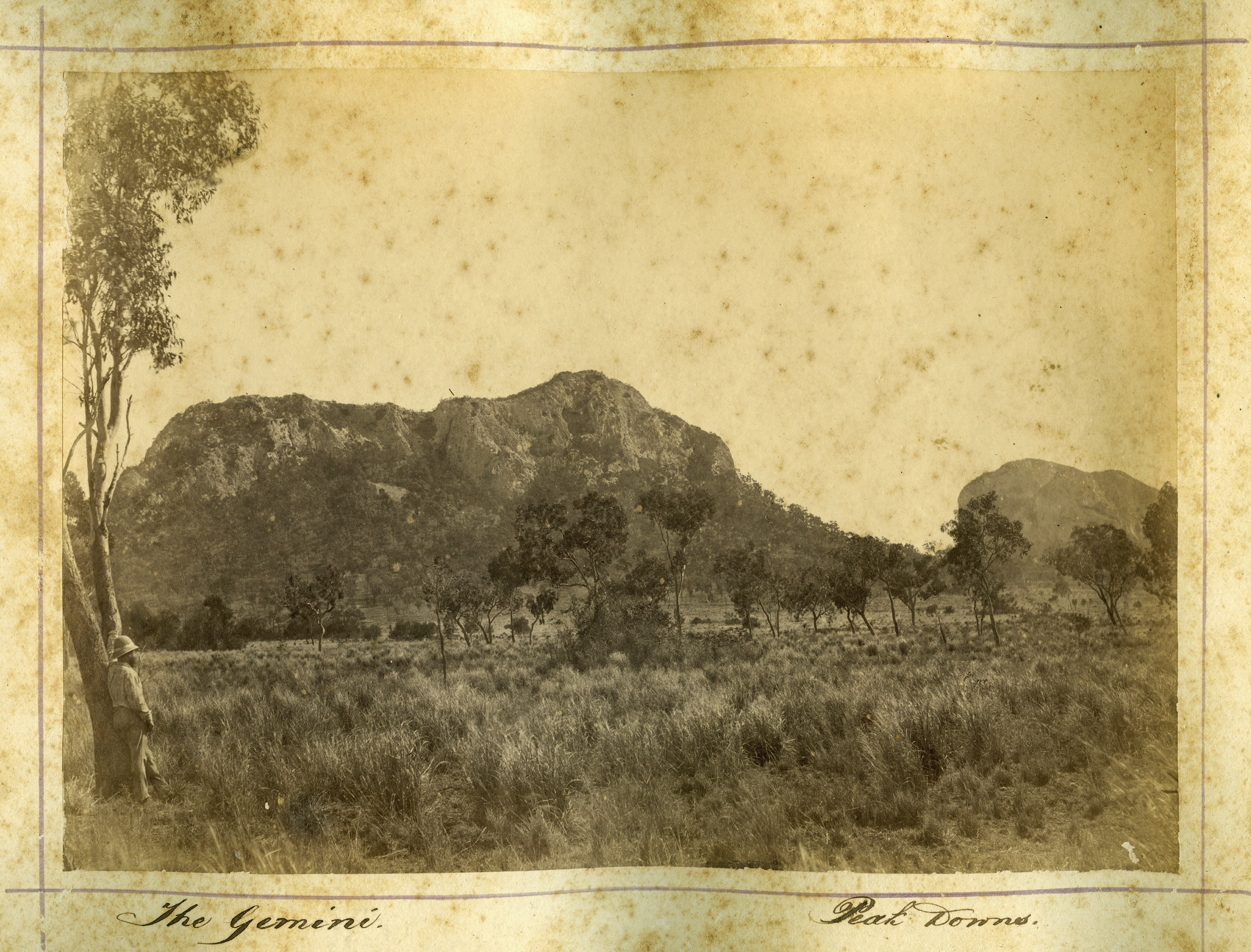
- Castor and Pollux, the Gemini Mountains

- Interactive map of Gemini Mountains
- Coordinates: 22.4391°S 147.8722°E
- Country: Australia
- State: Queensland
- LGA: Isaac Region
- Location: 59.3 km (36.8 mi) SSW of Moranbah; 228 km (142 mi) SW of Mackay; 996 km (619 mi) NW of Brisbane

Government
  - State electorate: Burdekin
  - Federal division: Capricornia

Area
  - Total: 556.8 km^{2} (215.0 sq mi)

Population
  - Total: 65 (2021 census)
  - Density: 0.1167/km^{2} (0.3024/sq mi)
- Time zone: UTC+10:00 (AEST)
- Postcode: 4721
Suburbs around Gemini Mountains
Kilcummin	Kilcummin	Winchester
Kilcummin	Gemini Mountains	Dysart
Wolfang	Wolfang	Dysart

Gemini Mountains is a rural locality in the Isaac Region, Queensland, Australia. In the 2021 census, Gemini Mountains had a population of 65 people.

== Geography ==
The Goonyella railway line forms most of the western boundary of the locality, with Mount McLaren railway station serving Graincorp's grain handling facility (22.3472°S 147.7558°E).

One of the four segments of the Peak Range National Park is in the south of the locality.

The locality contains the following mountains:

- Fletchers Awl (22.5119°S 147.9107°E) 530 metres (1,740 ft)
- Mount Castor (22.4648°S 147.8793°E) 568 metres (1,864 ft)
- Mount Commissioner (22.4823°S 147.8910°E) 490 metres (1,610 ft)
- Mount Mclaren (22.3568°S 147.7887°E) 466 metres (1,529 ft)
- Mount Pollux (22.4743°S 147.8761°E) 678 metres (2,224 ft)
- Mount Saddleback (22.4925°S 147.9080°E) 550 metres (1,800 ft)
- Red Riding Hood (22.4858°S 147.9641°E) 530 metres (1,740 ft)

The land use is predominantly crop growing with some grazing on native vegetation.

== History ==
The locality takes its name from the mountain range Gemini Mountains (22.4666°S 147.8833°E), which consists of two volcanic peaks, Mount Castor and Mount Pollux. Castor and Pollux were the Gemini twins in Greek and Roman mythology.

== Demographics ==
In the 2016 census, Gemini Mountains had a population of 51 people.

In the 2021 census, Gemini Mountains had a population of 65 people.

== Education ==
There are no schools in Gemini Mountains. The nearest government primary schools are:

- Moranbah State School in Moranbah to the north
- Dysart State School in neighbouring Dysart to the east
- Clermont State School in Clermont to the south
- Kilcummin State School in neighbouring Kilcummin to the west.

The nearest government secondary schools are:

- Moranbah State High School in Moranbah to the north
- Dysart State High School in neighbouring Dysart to the east
- Clermont State High School in Clemont to the south
