= Gordonstone =

Gordonstone may refer to:

- Gordonstone, Queensland, a locality in the Central Highlands Region, Australia
- a misspelling of Gordonstoun, a school in Scotland
