= Wolfang, Queensland =

Wolfang
- Suburb
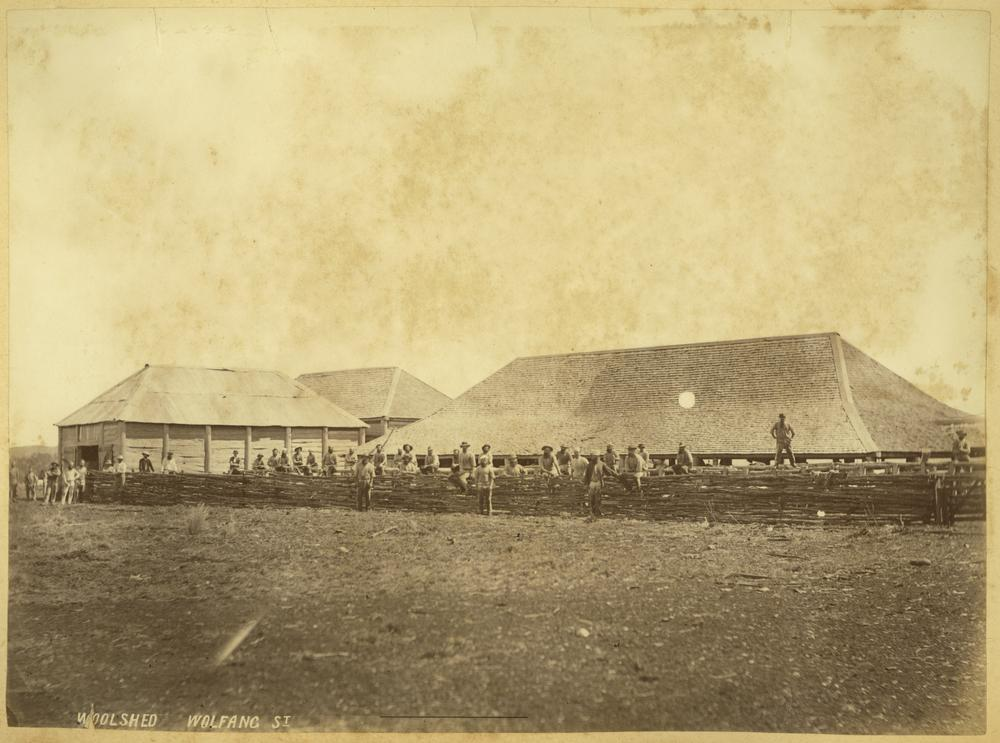
- Woolshed at Wolfang Station

- Interactive map of Wolfang
- Coordinates: 22.6541°S 147.8083°E
- Country: Australia
- State: Queensland
- LGA: Isaac Region
- Location: 26.4 km (16.4 mi) NNE of Clermont; 93.7 km (58.2 mi) SW of Moranbah; 105 km (65 mi) W of Dysart; 274 km (170 mi) SW of Mackay; 960 km (600 mi) NW of Brisbane

Government
  - State electorate: Burdekin
  - Federal division: Capricornia

Area
  - Total: 823.3 km^{2} (317.9 sq mi)

Population
  - Total: 84 (2021 census)
  - Density: 0.1020/km^{2} (0.2643/sq mi)
- Time zone: UTC+10:00 (AEST)
- Postcode: 4721
Suburbs around Wolfang
Kilcummin	Gemini Mountains	Dysart
Clermont	Wolfang	Dysart
Clermont	Cheeseborough	Cheeseborough

Wolfang is a rural locality in the Isaac Region, Queensland, Australia. In the 2021 census, Wolfang had a population of 84 people.

== Geography ==
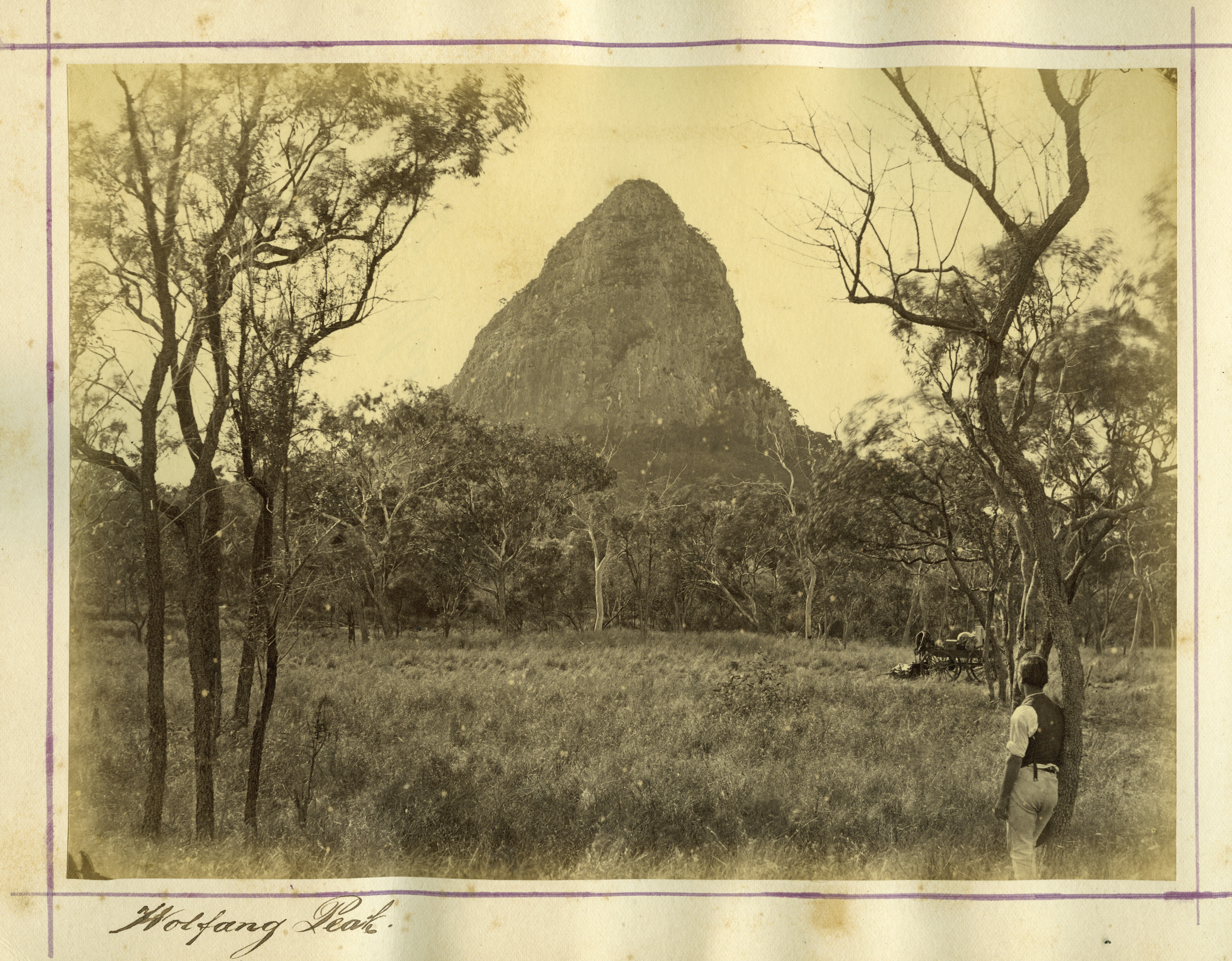
Wolfang Peak

Wolfang has the following mountains:

- Little Wolfang Peak (22.6202°S 147.9008°E) 445 metres (1,460 ft)
- Mount Donald (22.5765°S 147.9513°E) 770 metres (2,530 ft)
- Mount Macdonald (22.5271°S 147.8486°E) 574 metres (1,883 ft)
- Mount Milson (22.6259°S 147.6711°E) 375 metres (1,230 ft)
- Mount Oscar (22.7501°S 147.8354°E) 406 metres (1,332 ft)
- One Tree Hill (22.6232°S 147.8834°E) 350 metres (1,150 ft)
- Peak Hill (22.6301°S 147.9171°E) 390 metres (1,280 ft)
- Rocky Knob (22.6100°S 147.9023°E) 410 metres (1,350 ft)
- White Hill (22.6123°S 147.8831°E) 370 metres (1,210 ft)
- Wolfang Peak (22.5486°S 147.8343°E) 572 metres (1,877 ft)

== History ==
The name Wolfang is derived from the Wolfang pastoral station, which was named for the local mountain (now known as Wolfang Peak) by pastoralist Claudius A. Ker in the 1850s, because of its resemblance to a canine tooth ("wolf fang").

== Demographics ==
In the 2016 census, Wolfang had a population of 89 people.

In the 2021 census, Wolfang had a population of 84 people.

== Education ==
There are no schools in Wolfang. The nearest government primary schools are Clermont State School in neighbouring Clermont to the south-west and Dysart State School in neighbouring Dysart to the east. The nearest government secondary schools are Clermont State High School in Clermont and Dysart State High School in Dysart. There is also a Catholic primary school in Clermont.
