= Cotherstone, Queensland =

Cotherstone
- Suburb
- Interactive map of Cotherstone
- Coordinates: 22.7880°S 148.2744°E
- Country: Australia
- State: Queensland
- LGA: Central Highlands Region
- Location: 46.5 km (28.9 mi) SW of Dysart; 102 km (63 mi) N of Emerald; 372 km (231 mi) NW of Rockhampton; 933 km (580 mi) NNW of Brisbane

Government
  - State electorate: Gregory
  - Federal division: Capricornia

Area
  - Total: 173.5 km^{2} (67.0 sq mi)

Population
  - Total: 0 (2021 census)
  - Density: 0.0000/km^{2} (0.000/sq mi)
- Time zone: UTC+10:00 (AEST)
- Postcode: 4723
Suburbs around Cotherstone
Dysart	Dysart	Dysart
Lowestoff	Cotherstone	Dysart
Mount Macarthur	Mount Macarthur	Dysart

Cotherstone is a rural locality in the Central Highlands Region, Queensland, Australia. At the 2021 census, Cotherstone had "no people or a very low population".

== Geography ==
The central and eastern parts of the locality are mountainous and undeveloped with Paddy Peak in the south-east of the locality (22.8319°S 148.3236°E) at 459 metres (1,506 ft) above sea level. The lower eastern part of the locality is used for crops and grazing on native vegetation.

== Demographics ==
In the 2016 census, Cotherstone had "no people or a very low population".

In the 2021 census, Cotherstone had "no people or a very low population".

== Education ==
There are no schools in Cotherstone. The nearest primary and secondary schools are Dysart State School and Dysart State High School in neighbouring Dysart to the north-east.
