= Bundoora, Queensland =

Bundoora
- Suburb
- Interactive map of Bundoora
- Coordinates: 22.9752°S 148.4633°E
- Country: Australia
- State: Queensland
- LGA: Central Highlands Region
- Location: 44.0 km (27.3 mi) SW of Middlemount; 63.4 km (39.4 mi) E of Capella; 110 km (68 mi) N of Emerald; 285 km (177 mi) WNW of Rockhampton; 906 km (563 mi) NNW of Brisbane

Government
  - State electorate: Gregory
  - Federal divisions: Flynn; Capricornia

Area
  - Total: 442.0 km^{2} (170.7 sq mi)

Population
  - Total: 0 (2021 census)
  - Density: 0.0000/km^{2} (0.0000/sq mi)
- Time zone: UTC+10:00 (AEST)
- Postcode: 4723
Suburbs around Bundoora
Dysart	Dysart	Middlemount
Belcong	Bundoora	Middlemount
Lilyvale	Lilyvale	Mackenzie River

Bundoora is a rural locality in the Central Highlands Region, Queensland, Australia. In the 2021 census, Bundoora had "no people or a very low population".

== Geography ==
Expedition Peak is on the western boundary of the locality (22.9484°S 148.3344°E), rising to 430 metres (1,410 ft) above sea level.

The Goonyella railway line passes through the locality which is served by (from north to south):

- Bundoora railway station (22.8889°S 148.5303°E).
- German Creek Junction railway station (22.8978°S 148.5393°E).
- Oaky Creek Junction railway station (23.0466°S 148.4752°E).

The northern part of the locality is within the Bundoora State Forest which extends into neighbouring Dysart to the north-west. In the east of the locality are a number of mines:

- German Creek coal mine, which extends into neighbouring Middlemount
- Oakey Creek coal mine, which extends into neighbouring Lilyvale

Apart from the state forest and the mines, the land use is grazing on native vegetation.

== Demographics ==
In the 2016 census, Bundoora had a population of 13 people.

In the 2021 census, Bundoora had "no people or a very low population".

== Education ==
There are no schools in Bundoora. The nearest government primary schools are Tieri State School in Tieri to the south-west and Middlemount Community School in neighbouring Middlemount to the north-east. The nearest government secondary schools are Capella State High School in Capella to the south-west and Middlemount Community School in Middlemount.
