= Wyuna, Queensland =

Wyuna
- Suburb
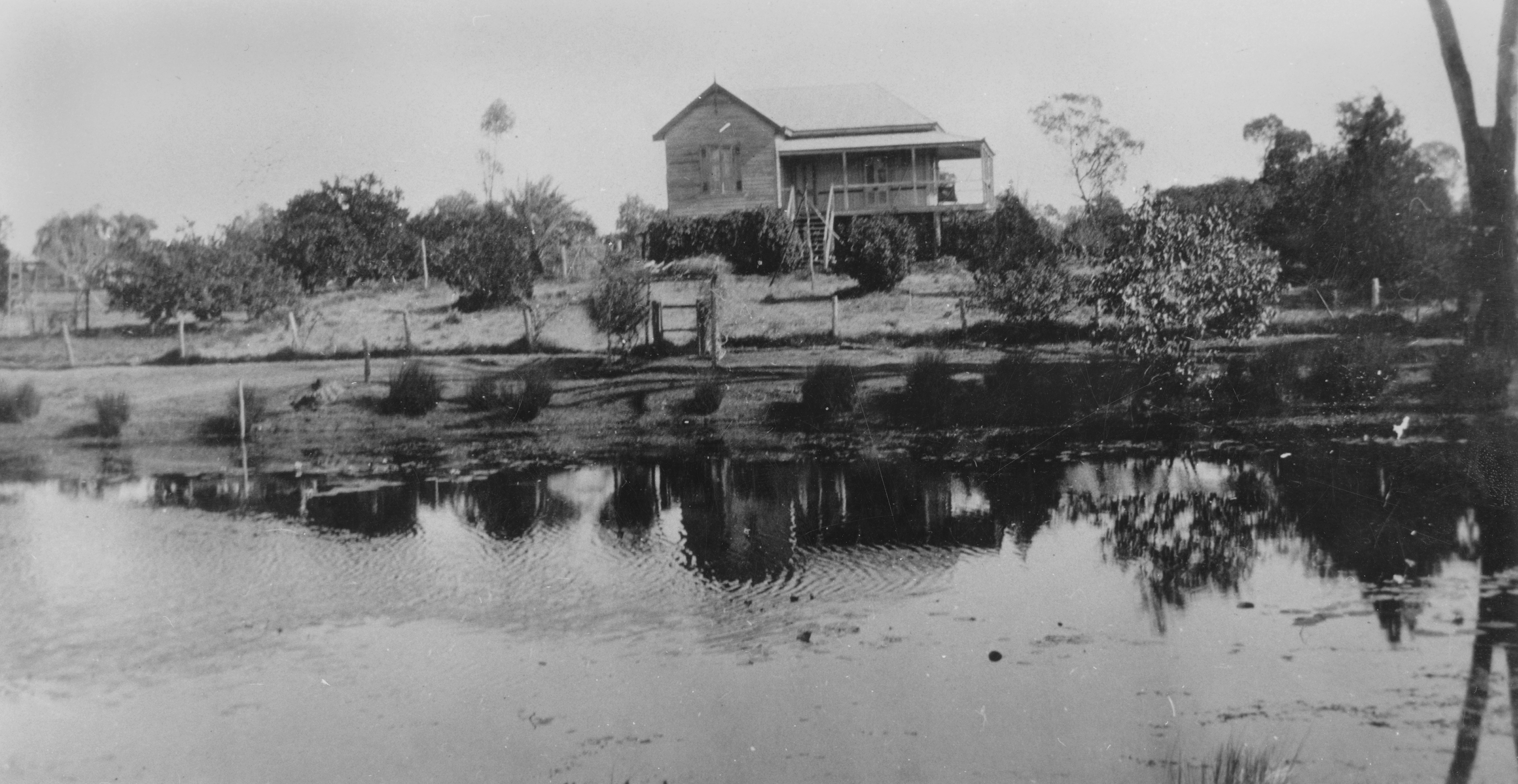
- Homestead at Wyuna Station, circa 1935

- Interactive map of Wyuna
- Coordinates: 23.3672°S 148.3458°E
- Country: Australia
- State: Queensland
- LGA: Central Highlands Region
- Location: 62.9 km (39.1 mi) NE of Emerald; 70.1 km (43.6 mi) SE of Capella; 76.6 km (47.6 mi) NW of Blackwater; 270 km (170 mi) W of Rockhampton; 881 km (547 mi) NNW of Brisbane

Government
  - State electorate: Gregory
  - Federal division: Flynn

Area
  - Total: 486.8 km^{2} (188.0 sq mi)

Population
  - Total: 46 (2021 census)
  - Density: 0.0945/km^{2} (0.2447/sq mi)
- Time zone: UTC+10:00 (AEST)
- Postcode: 4723
Suburbs around Wyuna
Gordonstone	Crinum	Lilyvale
Gordonstone	Wyuna	Mackenzie River
Fork Lagoons	Emerald	Comet

Wyuna is a rural locality in the Central Highlands Region, Queensland, Australia. Wyuna's postcode is 4723.

In the 2021 census, Wyuna had a population of 46 people.

== Geography ==
Theresa Creek enters the locality from the west (Gordonstone) and forms the western part of the southern boundary of the locality, after which it has its confluence (23.4483°S 148.2677°E) with the Nogoa River which enters from the south (Emerald) and then forms the rest of the southern boundary of the locality, before exiting to the south-east (Comet).

The Gregory Highway passes through the south-western corner of the locality, entering from the west (Gordonstone) and exiting to the south (Emerald).

The Yongala coal mine is in the east of the locality (23.3730°S 148.5101°E). Commencing in September 2022, the mine site is being rehabilitated, with approx 770 hectares (1,900 acres) expected to be completed by December 2025.

Apart from the mine, the land use is grazing on native vegetation and crop growing (mostly along the creeks and rivers).

== Demographics ==
In the 2016 census, Wyuna had a population of 45 people.

In the 2021 census, Wyuna had a population of 46 people.

== Education ==
There are no schools in Wyuna. The nearest government primary schools are Emerald North State School and Emerald State School, both in Emerald to the south. The nearest government secondary school is Emerald State High School, also in Emerald. There are also non-government schools in Emerald. However, students living in the east of Wyuna would be too distant to attend schools in Emerald; the alternatives are distance education and boarding school.
