= Retro, Queensland =

Retro
- Suburb
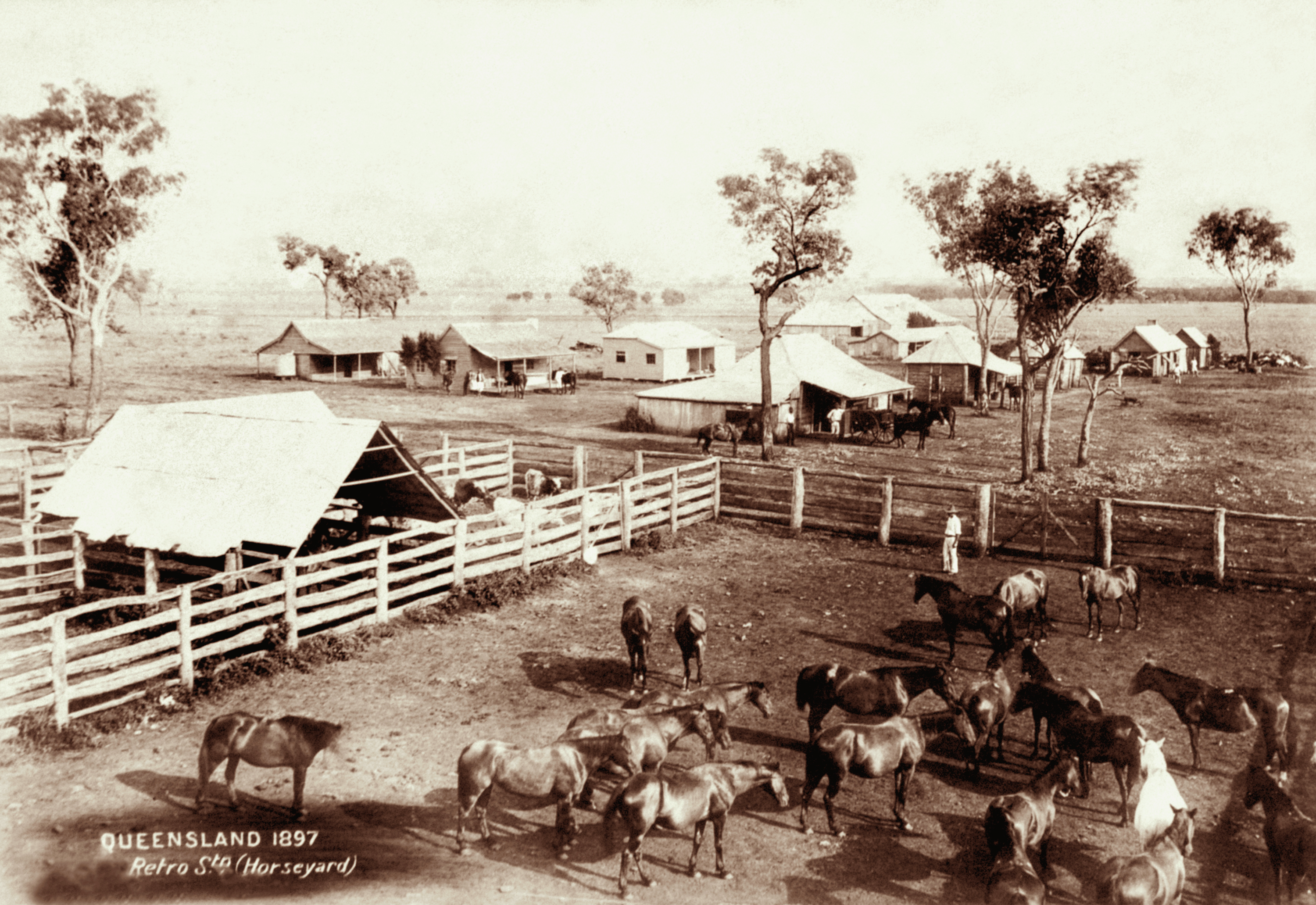
- Retro Downs pastoral station, circa 1899

- Interactive map of Retro
- Coordinates: 22.8475°S 147.9347°E
- Country: Australia
- State: Queensland
- LGA: Central Highlands Region
- Location: 29.7 km (18.5 mi) NW of Capella; 37.9 km (23.5 mi) ESE of Clermont; 81.6 km (50.7 mi) N of Emerald; 352 km (219 mi) WNW of Rockhampton; 913 km (567 mi) NW of Brisbane

Government
  - State electorate: Gregory
  - Federal division: Flynn

Area
  - Total: 435.8 km^{2} (168.3 sq mi)

Population
  - Total: 54 (2021 census)
  - Density: 0.1239/km^{2} (0.3209/sq mi)
- Time zone: UTC+10:00 (AEST)
- Postcode: 4723
Suburbs around Retro
| Cheeseborough | Cheeseborough | Dysart |
| Cheeseborough | Retro | Lowestoff |
| Hibernia | Hibernia | Khosh Bulduk |

Retro is a rural locality in the Central Highlands Region, Queensland, Australia. In the 2021 census, Retro had a population of 54 people.

== History ==
The Retro Downs pastoral property had been established by 1864.

== Demographics ==
In the 2016 census, Retro had a population of 30 people.

In the 2021 census, Retro had a population of 54 people.

== Education ==
There are no schools in Retro. The nearest government primary schools are Clermont State School in Clermont to the west and Capella State School in Capella to the south. The nearest government secondary schools are Clermont State High School in Clermont and Capella State High School in Capella.
