= Gordonstone, Queensland =

Gordonstone
- Suburb
- Interactive map of Gordonstone
- Coordinates: 23.3152°S 148.1327°E
- Country: Australia
- State: Queensland
- LGA: Central Highlands Region
- Location: 25.1 km (15.6 mi) N of Emerald; 28.9 km (18.0 mi) S of Capella; 295 km (183 mi) W of Rockhampton; 857 km (533 mi) NW of Brisbane

Government
  - State electorate: Gregory
  - Federal division: Flynn

Area
  - Total: 261.4 km^{2} (100.9 sq mi)

Population
  - Total: 32 (2021 census)
  - Density: 0.1224/km^{2} (0.317/sq mi)
- Time zone: UTC+10:00 (AEST)
- Postcode: 4702
Suburbs around Gordonstone
Hibernia	Chirnside	Crinum
Fork Lagoons	Gordonstone	Crinum
Fork Lagoons	Wyuna	Wyuna

Gordonstone is a rural locality in the Central Highlands Region, Queensland, Australia. In the 2021 census, Gordonstone had a population of 32 people.

== Geography ==
The locality is bounded by Theresa Creek to the west.

The Gregory Highway enters the locality from the south (Wyuna) and exits to the north (Chirnside). The Central Western railway line enters the locality from the south-west (Fork Lagoons) and exits to the north-west (Hibernia / Chirnside).

Pelican Lagoon is a waterhole in the west of the locality (23.2833°S 148.0666°E).

The land use is a mix of cropping and grazing on native vegetation.

== History ==
The name Gordonstone comes from the name of the pastoral run name, named in 1859 by pastoralist Gordon Sandeman using his first name and a reference to the basalt strata underneath the run.

== Demographics ==
In the 2016 census, Gordonstone had "no people or a very low population".

In the 2021 census, Gordonstone had a population of 32 people.

== Education ==
There are no schools in Gordonstone. The nearest government primary schools are Capella State School in Capella to the north and Emerald North State School in Emerald to the south. The nearest government secondary schools are Capella State High School in Capella and Emerald State High School in Emerald.
