= Theresa Creek, Queensland =

Theresa Creek
- Suburb
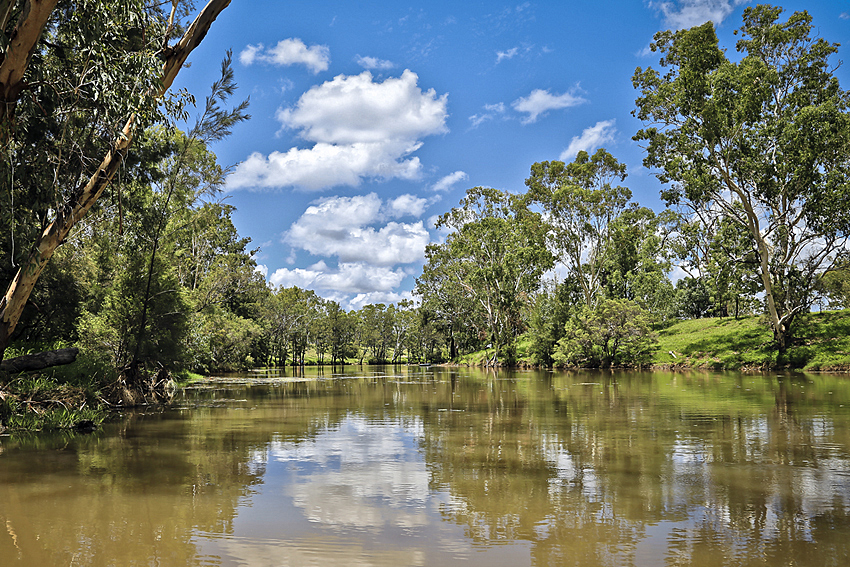
- Theresa Creek, 2015

- Interactive map of Theresa Creek
- Coordinates: 23.0894°S 147.5941°E
- Country: Australia
- State: Queensland
- LGA: Central Highlands Region
- Location: 25.0 km (15.5 mi) S of Clermont; 120 km (75 mi) NW of Emerald; 315 km (196 mi) SW of Mackay; 390 km (240 mi) WNW of Rockhampton; 951 km (591 mi) NNW of Brisbane

Government
  - State electorate: Gregory
  - Federal division: Flynn

Area
  - Total: 628.2 km^{2} (242.5 sq mi)

Population
  - Total: 42 (2021 census)
  - Density: 0.0669/km^{2} (0.1732/sq mi)
- Time zone: UTC+10:00 (AEST)
- Postcode: 4721
Suburbs around Theresa Creek
Clermont	Clermont	Cheeseborough; Hibernia
Peak Vale	Theresa Creek	Carbine Creek
Argyll	Argyll	Carbine Creek

Theresa Creek is a rural locality in the Central Highlands Region, Queensland, Australia. In the 2021 census, Theresa Creek had a population of 42 people.

== Geography ==
The locality of Theresa Creek has the following mountains:

- Mount Wallaby in the north of the locality (22.9768°S 147.5680°E), rising to 370 metres (1,210 ft) above sea level
- Mount Livingstone in the north of the locality (22.9859°S 147.5691°E) 310 metres (1,020 ft)
- Mount Hammond in the north of the locality (22.9865°S 147.5720°E) 367 metres (1,204 ft)
- Mount Pleasant in the north of the locality (23.0005°S 147.6175°E) 290 metres (950 ft)
- Mount Misery in the east of the locality (23.0323°S 147.7079°E) 339 metres (1,112 ft)
- Langton Edge in the southof the locality (23.1047°S 147.5970°E) 310 metres (1,020 ft)

The watercourse Theresa Creek, from which the locality presumably takes its name, rises in the Drummond Range in Peak Vale to the south-west. The creek forms sections of the locality's north-western boundary before flowing into Lake Theresa, a reservoir created by the Theresa Creek Dam. Part of Lake Theresa is within the locality with the rest being within the neighbouring locality of Clermont to the north-west; similarly the dam wall spans the two localities (22.9740°S 147.5577°E). After passing through the dam wall, the creek forms part of the north-western boundary of the locality and then flows south-east through the locality, exiting to the south-east (the locality of Carbine Creek). The creek eventually becomes a tributary of the Nogoa River.

The land use is grazing on native vegetation.

== Education ==
Theresa Creek Provisional School opened circa 1897. Circa 1903, the school closed due to low student numbers. In 1905, it became a half-time school with Douglas Creek Provisional School (meaning the two schools shared a single teacher). In 1906, the Douglas Creek school was closed and Theresa Creek Provisional School returned to full-time status. On 1 January 1909, it became Theresa Creek State School. It closed permanently in 1914.

== Demographics ==
In the 2016 census, Theresa Creek had a population of 54 people.

In the 2021 census, Theresa Creek had a population of 42 people.

== Education ==
The nearest government primary schools are Clermont State School in neighbouring Clermont to the north and Capella State School in Capella to the east. The nearest government secondary schools are Clermont State High School, also in Clermont, and Capella State High School, also in Capella.

There is also a Catholic primary school in Clermont.
