= Khosh Bulduk, Queensland =

Khosh Bulduk
- Suburb
- Interactive map of Khosh Bulduk
- Coordinates: 23.0008°S 148.0266°E
- Country: Australia
- State: Queensland
- LGA: Central Highlands Region
- Location: 11.9 km (7.4 mi) N of Capella; 63.9 km (39.7 mi) N of Emerald; 335 km (208 mi) WNW of Rockhampton; 895 km (556 mi) NW of Brisbane

Government
  - State electorate: Gregory
  - Federal division: Flynn

Area
  - Total: 257.8 km^{2} (99.5 sq mi)

Population
  - Total: 60 (2021 census)
  - Density: 0.233/km^{2} (0.60/sq mi)
- Time zone: UTC+10:00 (AEST)
- Postcode: 4723
Suburbs around Khosh Bulduk
Retro	Lowestoff	Mount Macarthur
Hibernia	Khosh Bulduk	Belcong
Hibernia	Capella	Belcong

Khosh Bulduk is a rural locality in the Central Highlands Region, Queensland, Australia. In the 2021 census, Khosh Bulduk had a population of 60 people.

== Demographics ==
In the 2016 census, Khosh Bulduk had a population of 51 people.

In the 2021 census, Khosh Bulduk had a population of 60 people.

== Education ==
There are no schools in Khosh Bulduk. The nearest government primary and secondary schools are Capella State School and Capella State High School, both in neighbouring Capella to the south.
