= Theresa Creek Dam =

Dam in Queensland, Australia

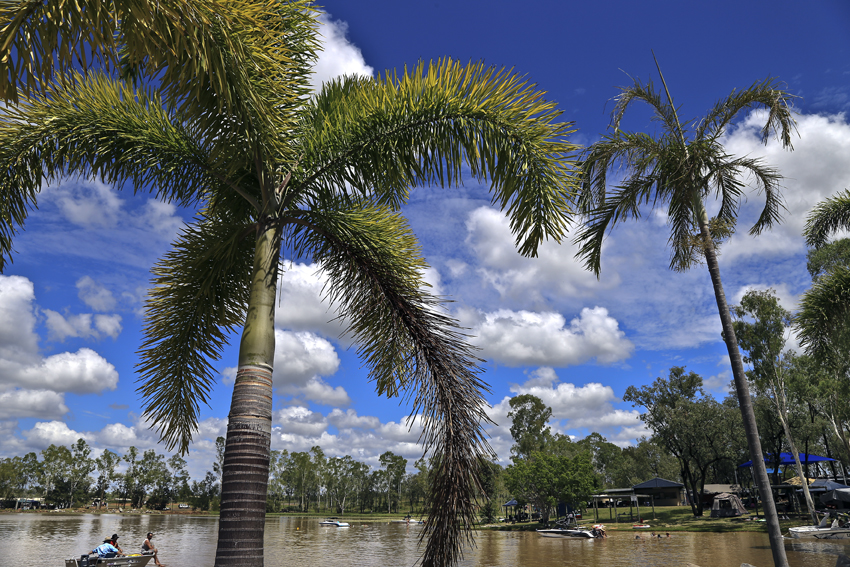
- The dam in 2015

- Location of the dam in Queensland
- Interactive map of Theresa Creek Dam
- Country: Australia
- Location: Clermont, Central Queensland
- Coordinates: 22°58′28″S 147°33′28″E
- Purpose: Potable water supply
- Status: Operational
- Opening date: 1983
- Built by: Leighton Contractors
- Operator: Isaac Regional Council

Dam and spillways
- Type of dam: Gravity and embankment
- Impounds: Theresa Creek
- Height (foundation): 13 m (43 ft)
- Length: 615 m (2,018 ft)
- Dam volume: 50×10^{3} m^{3} (1.8×10^{6} cu ft)
- Spillway type: Uncontrolled
- Spillway capacity: 6,400 m^{3}/s (230,000 cu ft/s)

Reservoir
- Creates: Lake Theresa
- Total capacity: 9.2 GL (7,500 acre⋅ft)
- Catchment area: 760 km^{2} (290 sq mi)
- Surface area: 250 ha (620 acres)
- Normal elevation: 266 m (873 ft) AHD

The Theresa Creek Dam is a gravity and earth-filled embankment dam 22 kilometres (14 mi) southwest of Clermont in Central Queensland, Australia.

== Overview ==
The dam is 13 metres (43 ft) high and 615 metres (2,018 ft) long. The resultant 9,200-megalitre (7,500 acre⋅ft) reservoir, Lake Theresa, draws from a catchment area of 760 square kilometres (290 sq mi), and extends into the neighbouring locality of Theresa Creek. The dam was constructed by Leighton Contractors as part of the Blair Athol coal mine and was completed in 1983 to supply water for the town of Clermont.

== See also ==
- List of dams and reservoirs in Australia
