= Trioncinia patens =

Scientific classification
- Kingdom: Plantae
- Clade: Tracheophytes
- Clade: Angiosperms
- Clade: Eudicots
- Clade: Asterids
- Order: Asterales
- Family: Asteraceae
- Genus: Trioncinia
- Species: T. patens

Binomial name
- Trioncinia patens A.E.Holland & D.W.Butler

Species of flowering plant

Trioncinia patens is a species of flowering plant in the family Asteraceae. It is endemic to Queensland.

== Description ==
Trioncinia patens is a perennial plant that typically grows up to 50 cm (20 in) tall. It has a thick woody taproot and several stems arise from the caudex. The alternate leaves are mostly basal, and are up to 7 cm long; the petioles are up to 4 cm long; the lamina is pinnatifid, and is up to 3 cm long and 2 cm wide; the narrow leaf segments are 1 to 1.5 mm wide, and have a short, sharply pointed tip at the apex. The inflorescences are branched in the upper half of the plant, the peduncles are 4 to 12 cm (1.6 to 4.7 in) long, often with 1 or 2 bracts in the upper half. The capitula are 6 to 9 mm in diameter, and are radiate; the domed receptacle is 1.6 to 2.4 mm in diameter. The involucres are hemispheric, the phyllaries are in 2 or 3 series; the short, triangular outer phyllaries are 1-2 mm long, and 0.5 to 1 mm wide; the middle and inner phyllaries are ovate to oblong or obovate, and are 2.4 to 3.6 mm long and 0.8 to 1.1 mm wide. The receptacular bracts are linear to lanceolate, and are 3 to 4 mm long and 0.1 to 0.3 mm wide. The ray florets have 2 lobes; the claw is 1 mm long; the yellow lamina is obovate, and is 1.8 to 2.2 mm long, and 1 to 1.4 mm wide. There are 11 to 17 disc florets that are 2 to 2.5 mm long and 0.2 mm wide. The anthers are 0.8 mm long. The cypselae are terate, and are 5 to 7 mm long and 0.7 to 1 mm in diameter.

== Distribution and habitat ==
Trioncinia patens is found from three locations, all on the toe-slopes of the peaks in or near the Peak Range National Park.

It grows in eucalypt woodland on dark-gray to red-brown clay or clay loams.
