= Marist College Emerald =

Coordinates: 23°32′36.71″S 148°09′29.44″E

- Emerald, Queensland; Australia

Information
- School type: Private, secondary
- Motto: In Veritate Libertas(The truth will set you free)
- Religious affiliation: Christian
- Denomination: Catholic
- Principal: Mark Green
- Grades: 7–12
- Gender: Co-educational
- Enrolment: approx. 550
- Houses: Moore, Heenan, Farrelly, Chanel, MacKillop
- Colours: Blue and silver, yellow and black, red and white, purple and gold, green.
- School fees: $2,600(AU)+

Marist College Emerald is a Catholic, co-educational day school located in Emerald, a rural town located in the Central Highlands, about 3 hours west of Rockhampton, Queensland, Australia.

== Academic achievements ==
As of 2010, seven Marist College students have achieved an overall position of 1, the top level of secondary school academic achievement in the state of Queensland.

== School houses ==
The school has five houses.

=== Moore House ===
Motto: Post Prolia Pramia (After the battle come the rewards).

Colour: blue

Emblem: shark

Moore House was named after Daniel Moore, parish priest of Emerald when the college was founded.

=== Heenan House ===
Motto: Per Aspera Ad Astra (Through difficulty to the stars).
Colour: gold
Emblem: hornet

Heenan House was named after Brian Heenan, Bishop of Rockhampton when the college was founded.

=== Farrelly House ===
Motto: Cituis Altuis Fortuis (Faster, Higher, Stronger).
Colour: red
Emblem: dragon

This house was named after Mark Farrelly, who was involved in the early development and planning of the college.

=== Chanel House ===
Motto: Honora Omnes Time Nullus (Respect all, fear none).
Colour: purple
Emblem: cobra

This house is named after Peter Chanel,

=== Mackillop House ===
Motto: Ubi Concordia, Ibi Victoria (Where there is unity, there is victory).
Colour: green
Emblem: green-eyed panther

This is the newest house, and is named after Mary MacKillop, Australia's first saint.
