= Trioncinia =

Scientific classification
- Kingdom: Plantae
- Clade: Tracheophytes
- Clade: Angiosperms
- Clade: Eudicots
- Clade: Asterids
- Order: Asterales
- Family: Asteraceae
- Subfamily: Asteroideae
- Tribe: Coreopsideae
- Genus: Trioncinia (F.Muell.) Veldkamp

Synonyms
- Glossogyne sect. Trioncinia F.Muell.

Genus of flowering plants

Trioncinia is a genus of flowering plants in the family Asteraceae.

Species

- Trioncinia patens A.E.Holland & D.W.Butler - Queensland
- Trioncinia retroflexa (F.Muell.) Veldkamp - Queensland
