= Belcong, Queensland =

Belcong
- Suburb
- Interactive map of Belcong
- Coordinates: 23.0236°S 148.1888°E
- Country: Australia
- State: Queensland
- LGA: Central Highlands Region
- Location: 16.9 km (10.5 mi) E of Capella; 19.6 km (12.2 mi) W of Tieri; 68.3 km (42.4 mi) N of Emerald; 325 km (202 mi) WNW of Rockhampton; 952 km (592 mi) NW of Brisbane

Government
  - State electorate: Gregory
  - Federal division: Flynn

Area
  - Total: 392.0 km^{2} (151.4 sq mi)

Population
  - Total: 38 (2021 census)
  - Density: 0.0969/km^{2} (0.251/sq mi)
- Time zone: UTC+10:00 (AEST)
- Postcode: 4723
Suburbs around Belcong
Khosh Bulduk	Mount Macarthur	Dysart
Capella	Belcong	Bundoora
Chirnside	Crinum	Lilyvale

Belcong is a rural locality in the Central Highlands Region, Queensland, Australia. In the 2021 census, Belcong had a population of 38 people.

== Geography ==
Mount Demipique is in the north-east of the locality (22.9122°S 148.2995°E) and rises to 589 metres (1,932 ft) above sea level.

The land use is predominantly grazing on native vegetation with some crop growing.

== Demographics ==
At the 2016 census, Belcong had a population of 46 people.

In the 2021 census, Belcong had a population of 38 people.

== Education ==
There are no schools in Belcong. The nearest government primary schools are Capella State School in neighbouring Capella to the west and Tieri State School in Tieri to the east. The nearest government secondary school is Capella State High School, also in Capella.
