= Hibernia, Queensland =

Hibernia
- Suburb
- Interactive map of Hibernia
- Coordinates: 23.0930°S 147.8861°E
- Country: Australia
- State: Queensland
- LGA: Central Highlands Region
- Location: 6.6 km (4.1 mi) SSW of Capella; 64.0 km (39.8 mi) SE of Clermont; 86.7 km (53.9 mi) N of Emerald; 329 km (204 mi) WNW of Rockhampton; 890 km (550 mi) NW of Brisbane

Government
  - State electorate: Gregory
  - Federal division: Flynn

Area
  - Total: 566.6 km^{2} (218.8 sq mi)

Population
  - Total: 82 (2021 census)
  - Density: 0.1447/km^{2} (0.3748/sq mi)
- Time zone: UTC+10:00 (AEST)
- Postcode: 4723
Suburbs around Hibernia
Cheeseborough	Retro	Khosh Bulduk
Theresa Creek	Hibernia	Capella
Carbine Creek	Fork Lagoons	Chirnside; Gordonstone

Hibernia is a rural locality in the Central Highlands Region, Queensland, Australia. In the 2021 census, Hibernia had a population of 82 people.

== Geography ==
The Central Western railway line forms the north-eastern boundary of the locality entering from the east (Capella) and exiting to the north-west (Cheeseborough).

The Gregory Highway enters the locality from the east (Capella) and exits to the north-west (Cheeseborough).

Despite its name, Capella airport (ICAO: YCEL) is at Airport Road in Hibernia but on the boundary with neighbouring Capella (23.0922°S 148.0068°E). It has a 985-by-10-metre (3,232 by 33 ft) gravel airstrip. It has no lighting so it is only suitable for daytime use. It is operated by the Central Highlands Regional Council.

== Demographics ==
In the 2016 census, Hibernia had a population of 56 people.

In the 2021 census, Hibernia had a population of 82 people.

== Education ==
There are no schools in Hibernia. The nearest government primary schools are Capella State School in neighbouring Capella to the east and Clermont State School in Clermont to the north-west. The nearest government secondary schools are Capella State High School in neighbouring Capella to the east and Clermont State High School in Clermont to the north-west.
