= Lilyvale Stand Monument =

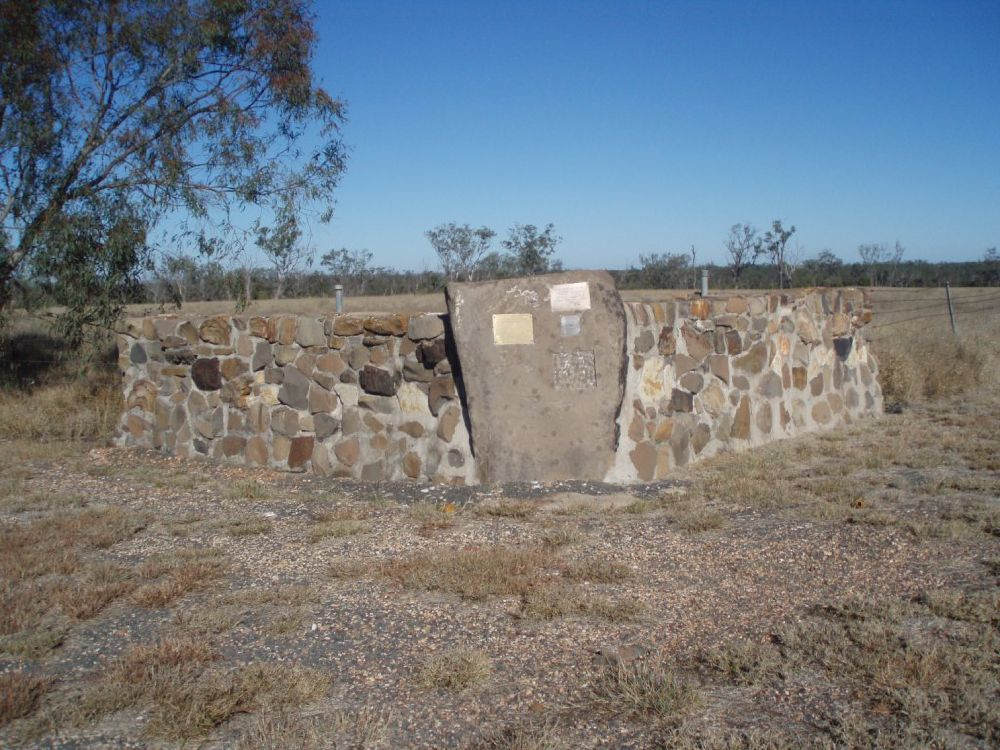
- Lilyvale Stand Monument, 2009

- Location within Queensland Location within Australia
- 23.2118°S 148.3483°E
- Location: Lilyvale Road, Crinum, Central Highlands Region, Queensland, Australia

History
- Built: 1998

Queensland Heritage Register
- Official name: Lilyvale Stand Monument
- Type: state heritage (built)
- Designated: 2 April 2004
- Reference no.: 602167
- Significant period: 1990s (fabric); 1997–1999 (historical, protest period)
- Significant components: plaque, memorial – wall

Lilyvale Stand Monument is a heritage-listed memorial at Lilyvale Road, Crinum, Queensland, Australia. It was built in 1998. It was added to the Queensland Heritage Register on 2 April 2004.

== History ==
The Lilyvale Stand Monument was constructed in 1998 by a group of dismissed mine workers from the Gordonstone Coal Mine (later renamed Rio Tinto to Kestral Coal Mine). Following their dismissal, the mine workers commenced a protest line in early October 1997, which was to continue for 22 months, until August 1999, becoming Australia's longest running black coal dispute.

The Gordonstone Coal Mine, an underground coal mine located approximately 62 kilometres (39 mi) north-east of Emerald, commenced operations in 1992. The life of the mine was thought to be about 25 years, with the project being undertaken as a joint venture by ARCO (an American oil company), Mitsui (a Japanese coal trader) and Australian company MLC. ARCO was the senior partner with 80% ownership. At the time, over $500 million was invested in the project. By 1996–97, total raw coal produced at Gordonstone Coal Mine was 4.4 million tonnes, breaking world production records for an underground coal mine.

Shortly after the federal Workplace Relations Act 1996 became law in mid-1997, 312 miner workers at the Gordonstone Coal Mine were dismissed, as the miners were not interested in accepting the company's direction that mine workers surrender conditions in their certified Enterprise Bargaining Agreement (EBA). The 312 mine workers, members of the Construction, Forestry, Mining and Energy Union (CFMEU), resisted the company's attempts for them to agree to new terms, considering them unacceptable. The new agreements were products of the Workplace Relations Act, which established Australian Workplace Agreements as individual contracts between employer and employee instead of collective bargaining through Enterprise Bargaining Agreements. Considerable industrial trouble has resulted from enforcement of this provision.

By September 1997, two employees had accepted individual contracts, with the other 310 opting to remain with the EBA. With negotiations faltering, ARCO made the decision, on 1 October 1997, to retrench the entire production and engineering workforce of 312 employees. The mine workers subsequently set up a protest line on 6 October 1997. The protestors continued a 24 hours a day, 7 days a week protest that was to last for 22 months, becoming Australia's longest black coal industry dispute.

ARCO had kept on a management team of over 100 and commenced recruiting a new workforce. The Australian Industrial Relations Commission (AIRC) ordered that the company give preference to former workers. The company refused to reopen the mine on those terms. The Gordonstone Coal Mine sat idle and in February 1998 the AIRC found that the dismissals had been unfair and ordered ARCO to pay compensation. The workers were awarded Australia's largest unfair dismissal ruling, leading to a payout of $4.6 million to 282 of the retrenched employees who brought applications to the AIRC.

In October 1998, companies wholly owned by Rio Tinto Limited negotiated to purchase the mine. The intention of Rio Tinto was to recommence mining operations utilising a new workforce not connected to the CFMEU. The CFMEU argued that Rio Tinto should re-engage the entire workforce that had previously been dismissed by ARCO, with proceedings commencing in the AIRC to obtain such a result. Rio Tinto claimed that the dispute was one between the CFMEU and Gordonstone Coal Management Pty Ltd, and that it was not involved. The ruling was made that Rio Tinto should be made a party to proceedings.

In the meantime, the protest line continued. When Rio Tinto Limited acquired the mine, the numbers on the protest line increased. It was during protracted legal actions that the members of the protest line decided that a reminder of its struggle was in order and set about designing and building a monument. The construction of the monument also served to assist the protestors in overcoming what was increasingly a frustrating and tedious daily existence as the legal battle associated with the retrenchments was being carried out in the AIRC and the Federal and High Courts. Members of the protest line gathered the materials for the monument, including stones and petrified wood, from the surrounding area. Concrete required for mortar was donated to the protest group.

Construction of the wall took approximately four months and was completed by November 1998. A ceremony to bless it was organised, to be followed by a day rally in Emerald. Initially, the local Roman Catholic priest was approached to undertake the blessing; however, he declined as the congregation was divided in its opinion over the Gordonstone mine issue. Eventually, the Captain of the Salvation Army, Steven Metcher, agreed to perform the blessing.

The Salvation Army, particularly Captain Metcher, had over the previous year, assisted with the counselling of many families who had been affected by events at the mine. The wall was officially blessed on 22 November 1998 with speeches being made by representatives of workers throughout Australia.

With the contract of purchase completed on 10 February 1999, Rio Tinto took over the control of the mine and immediately reopened it using a "scab" workforce (a derogatory term given to a person or employee willing to cross a picket line). This action aggravated the protest line and through the assistance of families, friends and associated groups and Unions, the numbers on the Lilyvale Stand (as it became known) increased once again. The protest line attempted to stop the non-union workforce entering or leaving the mine site - resulting in over 280 people being arrested over the next four months, including Labor MLA Jim Pearce, a former coal miner.

On 10 August 1999, the members of the Lilyvale Stand decided to remove the picket line, following a Supreme Court of Queensland injunction preventing the protesters from stopping workers entering or leaving the mine, which had been renamed by Rio Tinto from Gordonstone Coal Mine to Kestral Coal Pty Ltd.

It is estimated that over 5000 people, including mine workers from Tasmania, Western Australia and the Northern Territory, visited the picket line throughout the 22 month protest.

== Description ==
The Lilyvale Stand Monument is a wall addressing both the Lilyvale Road (Gregory Mine Road) to the north and Kestral Coal Access Mine Road to the east.

The wall is approximately six metres along both the northern and eastern sides. It is approximately 1.2 metres (3 ft 11 in) high and 1 metre (3 ft 3 in) wide.

The wall is constructed predominantly of large stone blocks concreted together, with a large face stone, placed at the intersection of the wall lengths, addressing the Gregory Mine Road. The face stone contains spaces for four plaques. Some pieces of petrified timber have also been used in the construction of the wall.

The Lilyvale Stand Monument is situated approximately three kilometres away from the Kestral coal mine.

== Heritage listing ==
Lilyvale Stand Monument was listed on the Queensland Heritage Register on 2 April 2004 having satisfied the following criteria.

The place is important in demonstrating the evolution or pattern of Queensland's history.

The Lilyvale Stand Monument, constructed in 1998, is significant as a physical reminder of Australia's longest running dispute in the black coal industry with a protest line that continued uninterrupted for a total of 22 months, from October 1997 until August 1999. It demonstrates the pattern of Queensland's industrial history whereby Unions and workers resist the implementation of industrial legislation which they consider unfavourable to them.

The place demonstrates rare, uncommon or endangered aspects of Queensland's cultural heritage.

The Lilyvale Stand Monument is also significant as it was constructed during the days of the protest line by members of the Lilyvale Stand, from materials obtained from the general area, rather than as a retrospective tribute to the protest line members. Strike memorials are uncommon in Queensland and those built on site during the dispute are particularly rare.

The place has a strong or special association with a particular community or cultural group for social, cultural or spiritual reasons.

The Lilyvale Stand Monument is significant for its strong social significance, particularly for its association with the workers from the Gordonstone Coal Mine, the Construction, Forestry, Mining and Energy Union, and the families, friends and supporters of the mine workers who constructed it, as a representation of their determination to fight a retrenchment decision that the Australian Industrial Relations Commission later ruled to be a case of unfair dismissal.
