= Dysart, Queensland =

Dysart
- Town
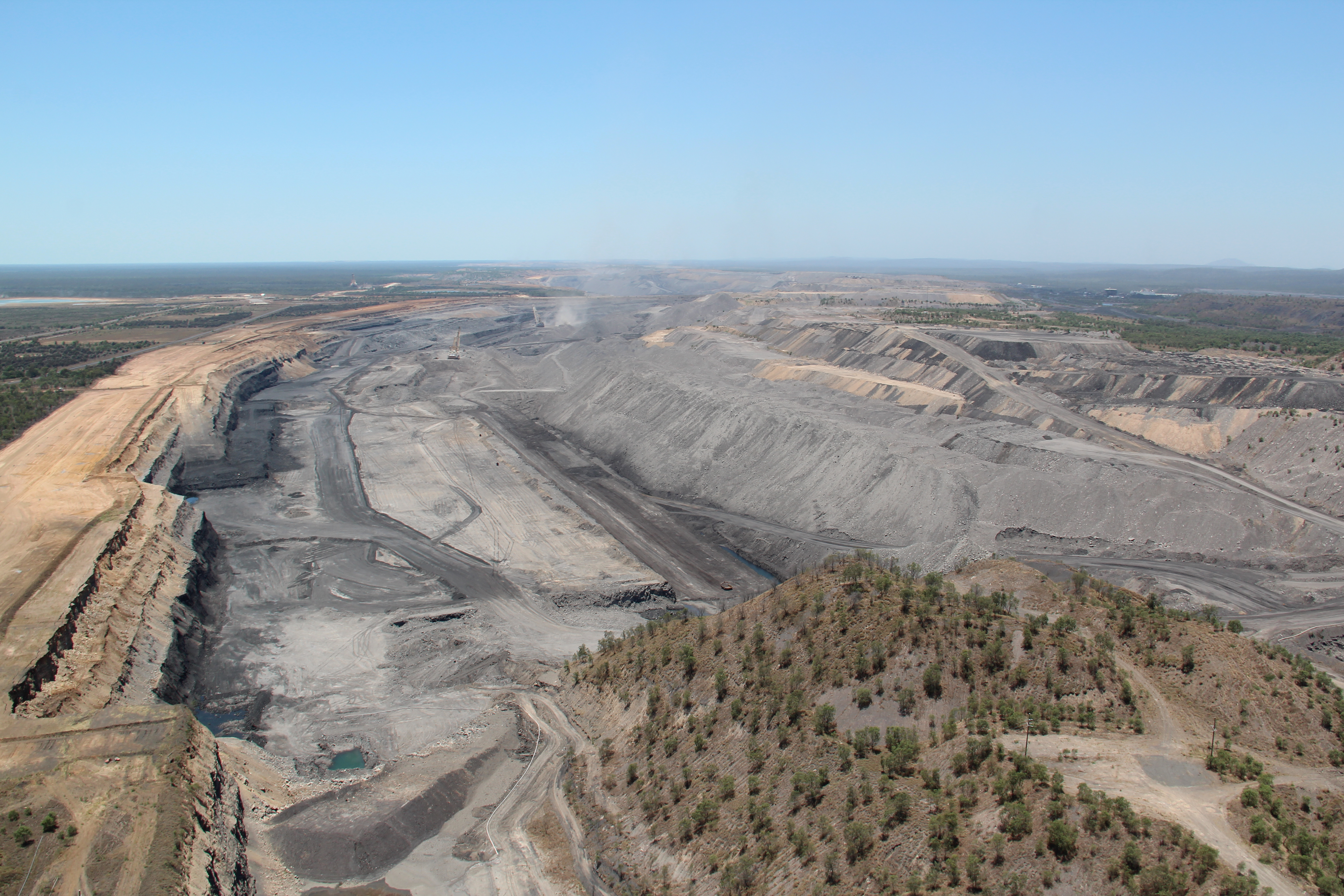
- Saraji coal mine, Dysart, 2012

- Interactive map of Dysart
- Coordinates: 22.5855°S 148.3508°E
- Country: Australia
- State: Queensland
- LGA: Isaac Region
- Location: 83.7 km (52.0 mi) SE of Moranbah; 128 km (80 mi) NNE of Emerald; 244 km (152 mi) SW of Mackay; 318 km (198 mi) NW of Rockhampton; 945 km (587 mi) NW of Brisbane

Government
  - State electorate: Burdekin
  - Federal division: Capricornia

Area
  - Total: 3,459.4 km^{2} (1,335.7 sq mi)
- Elevation: 223 m (732 ft)

Population
  - Total: 2,918 (2021 census)
  - Density: 0.84350/km^{2} (2.1847/sq mi)
- Time zone: UTC+10:00 (AEST)
- Postcode: 4745
- Mean max temp: 34 °C (93 °F)
- Mean min temp: 10 °C (50 °F)
- Annual rainfall: 590 mm (23 in)
Localities around Dysart
Winchester; Gemini Mountains	Coppabella	Valkyrie
Wolfang; Cheeseborough	Dysart	May Downs
Retro; Lowestoff; Cotherstone	Mount Macarthur; Belcong	Middlemount; Bundoora

Dysart is a town and rural locality in the Isaac Region, Queensland, Australia. It is a service centre for mines and grazing properties in the district, with most residents being employed by the coal mines. In the 2021 census, the locality of Dysart had a population of 2,918 people.

== Geography ==
=== Railways ===
The locality is served by the Goonyella railway network which connects the Bowen Basin coalfields with the coal wharves at Hay Point on the coast. The locality is served by numerous railway stations (from north to south):

- Winchester railway station (22.1463°S 148.2591°E)
- Harrow railway station (22.3592°S 148.2462°E)
- Saraji Junction railway station (22.3959°S 148.2725°E)
- Saraji railway station (22.4164°S 148.2762°E)
- Lake Vermont railway station (22.4665°S 148.4055°E)
- Dysart railway station (22.5858°S 148.3638°E)
- Stephens railway station (22.6535°S 148.3965°E)
- Norwich Park Junction railway station (22.7296°S 148.4516°E)
- Norwich Park railway station (22.7538°S 148.4601°E)

=== Mountains ===
The terrain is mountainous, with the following named peaks (from north to south):

- Walkers Peak (22.5068°S 148.2756°E) 438 metres (1,437 ft)
- Mount Phillips (22.5511°S 148.1633°E) 681 metres (2,234 ft)
- Mount Walker (22.6013°S 148.0864°E) 390 metres (1,280 ft)
- Campbell Peak (22.6068°S 148.2234°E) 430 metres (1,410 ft)
- Lords Table Mountain (22.6611°S 148.0202°E)
- Gilberts Dome (22.7004°S 148.0826°E) 742 metres (2,434 ft)
- Browns Peak (22.7419°S 148.0986°E) 807 metres (2,648 ft)
- Charleys Peak (22.7441°S 148.0872°E) 610 metres (2,000 ft)
- Eastern Peak (22.7586°S 148.1304°E) 610 metres (2,000 ft)
- Mount Dalrymple (22.9208°S 148.3286°E) 472 metres (1,549 ft)
- Expedition Peak (22.9441°S 148.3340°E) 430 metres (1,410 ft)

== History ==
Prussian explorer Ludwig Leichhardt explored the region in 1845 being the first European to do so. This included climbing to the summit of nearby Campbell Peak and allegedly building a stone cairn there.

The town of Dysart was established in 1973 to support the Saraji coal mine with the Post Office opening on 8 October 1973. The name Dysart comes from the name of a pastoral run and a parish in the area; it means a retreat for monks and hence solitude in Irish Gaelic.

Dysart State School opened on 21 May 1973. A secondary department was added in 1979, which operated until Dysart State High School opened on 20 September 1980.

The Dysart Library opened in 1982.

According to the Real Estate Institute of Queensland in 2011, Dysart had a median rent of $1,200 a week for a house, making it the most expensive in Queensland. In 2012, the median house price in the town was $475,000. The closure of the Norwich Park Mine was expected to bring property prices down. In August 2015, the rental price for a three-bedroom home in Dysart started at $130 a week.

== Demographics ==
In the 2011 census, the town of Dysart had a population of 3,003 people.

In the 2016 census, the locality of Dysart had a population of 2,991 people.

In the 2021 census, the locality of Dysart had a population of 2,918 people.

== Economy ==
Norwich Park coal mine was located 15 kilometres (9.3 mi) south of the town. It closed on 11 April 2012, after 32 years of operation. Following its closure, its miners were relocated to the Saraji Mine, which is located 26 kilometres (16 mi) north of the town, and has one of the largest coal reserves in Asia and the world. In 2020, the Norwich Park mine reopened under the new name Saraji South.

== Education ==
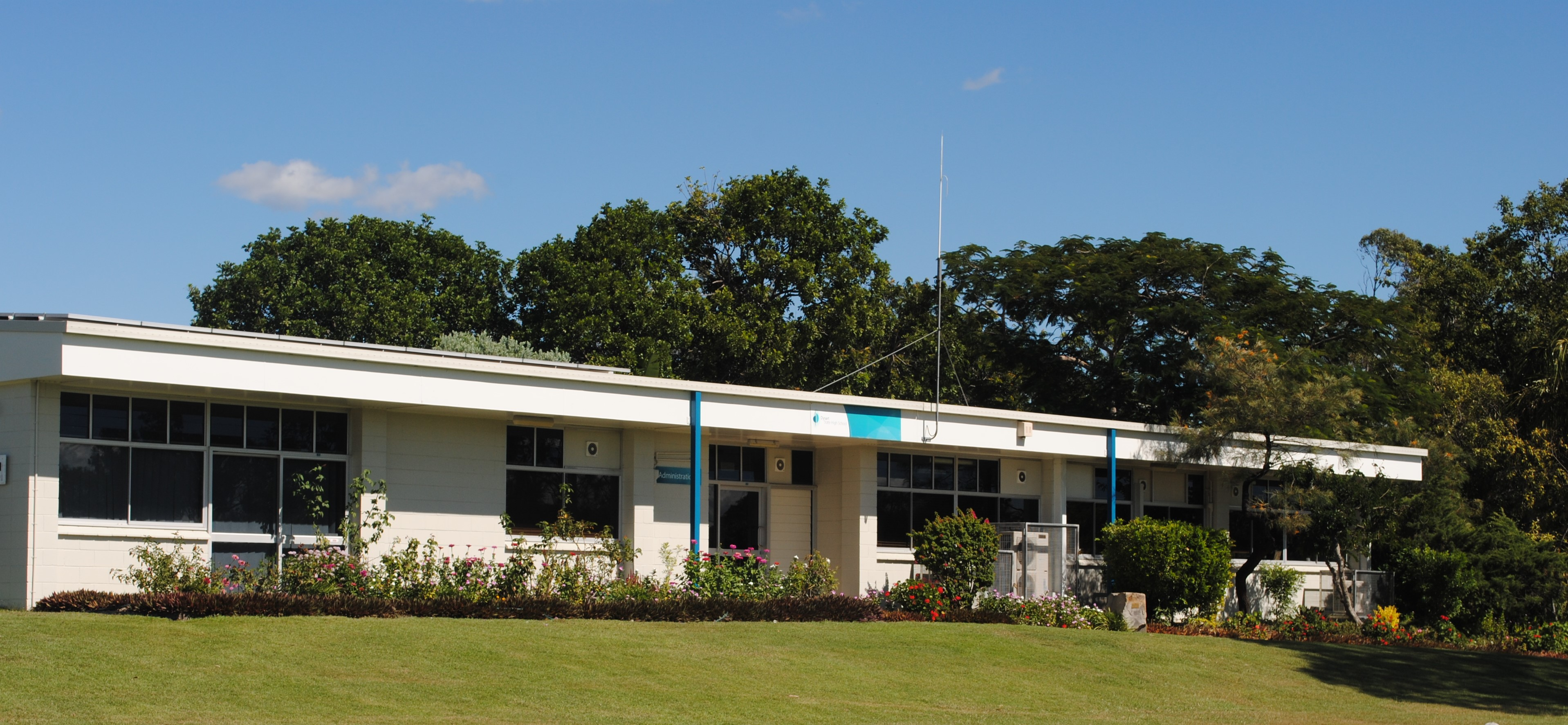
Dysart State High School, 2009

Dysart State School is a government primary (Prep–6) school for boys and girls at 4 Garnham Drive (22.5877°S 148.3475°E). In 2018, the school had an enrolment of 347 students with 25 teachers (24 full-time equivalent) and 15 non-teaching staff (9 full-time equivalent).

Dysart State High School is a government secondary (7–12) school for boys and girls at Edgerley Street (22.5840°S 148.3548°E). In 2018, the school had an enrolment of 162 students with 17 teachers (16 full-time equivalent) and 20 non-teaching staff (13 full-time equivalent).

== Sport ==
Rugby league is a popular sport in Dysart. Dysart junior team is named 'Dysart Bulls' with team colours of red, black, and white. The senior team is also called 'Dysart Bulls' and has about six home games a year. The Bulls were the junior home team of Matt Sing, who played 24 State of Origin Games for Queensland.

Dysart also has a very popular soccer team, the Dysart Devils.

== Amenities ==
The Isaac Regional Council operates a public library located in Shannon Crescent, Dysart.

== Facilities ==
Dysart has the following emergency services:

- Dysart Police Station (22.5862°S 148.3489°E)
- Dysart Ambulance Station (22.5855°S 148.3494°E)
- Saraji Mine Ambulance Station (22.4285°S 148.2760°E)
- Dysart Fire Station (22.5900°S 148.3483°E)
- Dysart SES Facility (22.5901°S 148.3410°E)
- Dysart Mine Rescue Station (22.5909°S 148.3394°E)

Dysart Cemetery is on the eastern edge of the town at 163 Dysart Bypass Road (22.5895°S 148.3591°E). It offers lawn burial and a columbarium wall for ashes.

== Events ==
Dysart is home to Norwich Park Mines Day, held to increase the public's knowledge of the mining industry.

== Attractions ==
A monument to the coal and rail industry consisting of a large truck and coal wagon is located at the northern entrance to the town.
