= Chirnside, Queensland =

Chirnside
- Suburb
- Interactive map of Chirnside
- Coordinates: 23.1663°S 148.0730°E
- Country: Australia
- State: Queensland
- LGA: Central Highlands Region
- Location: 7.5 km (4.7 mi) SSE of Capella; 46.9 km (29.1 mi) NNW of Emerald; 317 km (197 mi) W of Rockhampton; 879 km (546 mi) NNW of Brisbane

Government
  - State electorate: Gregory
  - Federal division: Flynn

Area
  - Total: 111.0 km^{2} (42.9 sq mi)

Population
  - Total: 56 (2021 census)
  - Density: 0.505/km^{2} (1.307/sq mi)
- Time zone: UTC+10:00 (AEST)
- Postcode: 4723
Suburbs around Chirnside
Capella	Belcong	Belcong
Hibernia	Chirnside	Crinum
Hibernia	Gordonstone	Crinum

Chirnside is a rural locality in the Central Highlands Region, Queensland, Australia. In the 2021 census, Chirnside had a population of 56 people.

== History ==
Boundary Provisional School opened on 3 June 1897. On 1 January 1909, it became Boundary State School. In November 1935, it was renamed Chirnside State School. It closed in 1939 due to low student numbers.

== Demographics ==
At the 2016 census, Chirnside had a population of 30 people.

In the 2021 census, Chirnside had a population of 56 people.

== Education ==
There are no schools in Chirnside. The nearest government primary and secondary schools are Capella State School and Capella State High School, both in neighbouring Capella to the north-west.
