= John Roper (explorer) =

English explorer (1824 – 1895)

John Roper (29 February 1824 – 15 September 1895) was an English explorer in Australia, remembered as the last survivor of Ludwig Leichhardt's successful expedition from Brisbane, Queensland, to Port Essington, Northern Territory in 1844–45.

== History ==
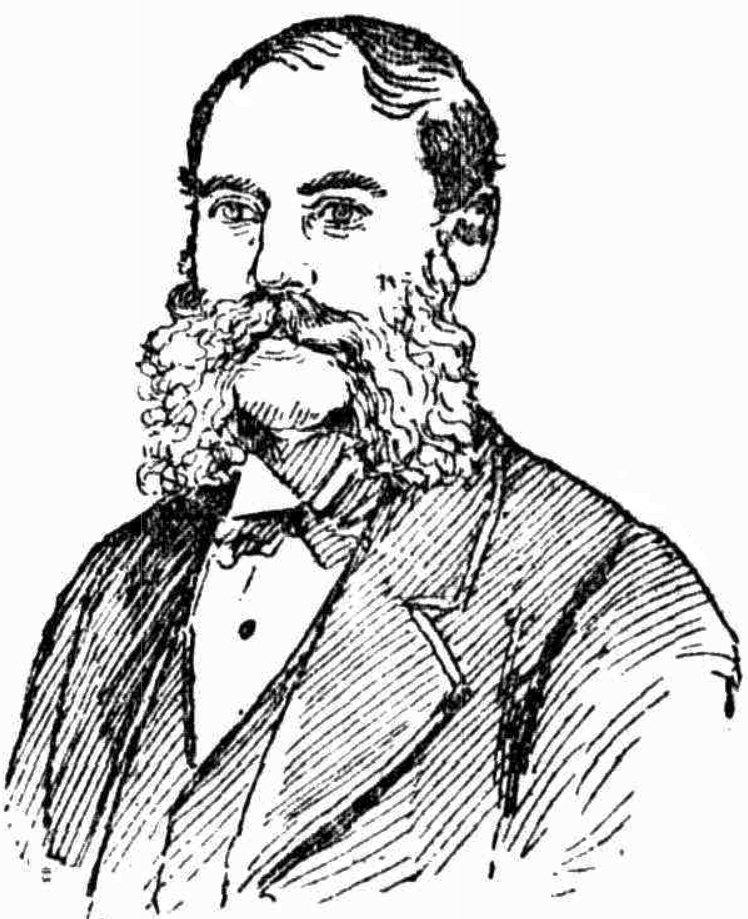
John Roper

Roper was born at Gayton Thorpe, Norfolk, England. and was educated at schools in Fakenham and Lynn.

He arrived in Australia in 1843, first settling in the Hunter River, managing a station for Alexander Campbell Walker. He joined Leichhardt's party in 1844, the two sharing expenses.

He was one of three in the party who were speared by Aboriginals on the night of 28 June 1844 while they were sleeping. They had previously enjoyed good relations with the Aboriginal people, so had not posted a watch. Roper and Calvert survived but John Gilbert died of his wounds. One of Roper's head wounds resulted in the loss of sight in one eye.

He returned to Sydney in 1846 with Leichhardt, then settled in Albury, where he became clerk of petty sessions in 1847, magistrate in 1854, and mayor in 1862. From 1880 to around 1893 he was an inspector of stock at Merriwa.

He died of pleurisy at his home, "Rosebery Park", Merriwa, aged 71.

== Named in his honour ==
The following places are named after him, all by explorer Ludwig Leichhardt:

- Ropers Peak in the Peak Range, in Central Queensland
- Roper River, which runs east through the Northern Territory into the Gulf of Carpentaria, and Roper Bar, where they effected a crossing
