= Lilyvale, Queensland (Central Highlands Region) =

Lilyvale
- Suburb
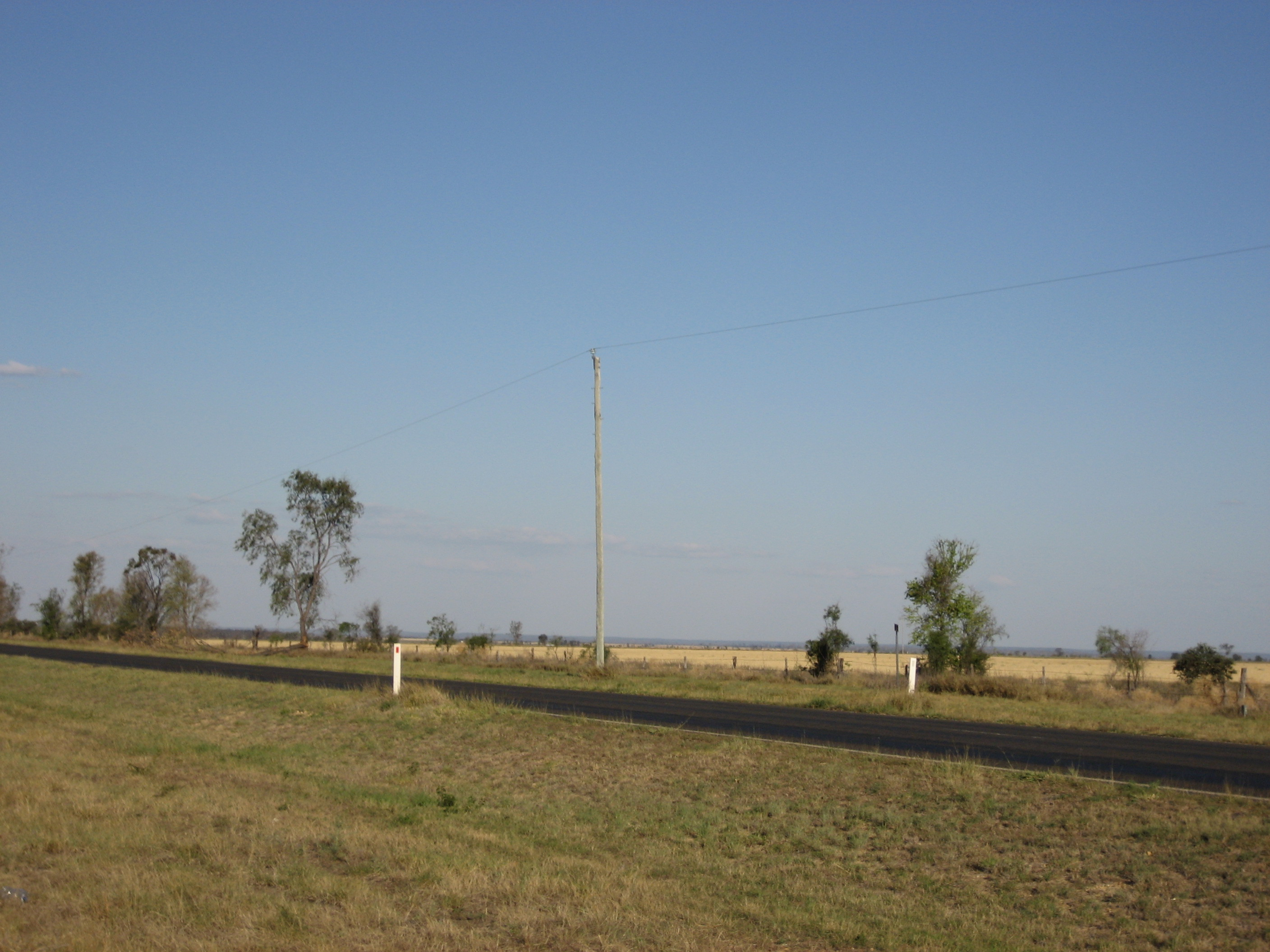
- Lilyvale Road, 2007

- Interactive map of Lilyvale
- Coordinates: 23.1463°S 148.4391°E
- Country: Australia
- State: Queensland
- LGA: Central Highlands Region
- Location: 48.7 km (30.3 mi) SW of Middlemount; 50.1 km (31.1 mi) E of Capella; 102 km (63 mi) NNW of Emerald; 300 km (190 mi) WNW of Rockhampton; 929 km (577 mi) NNW of Brisbane

Government
  - State electorate: Gregory
  - Federal division: Flynn

Area
  - Total: 682.8 km^{2} (263.6 sq mi)

Population
  - Total: 58 (2021 census)
  - Density: 0.0849/km^{2} (0.2200/sq mi)
- Time zone: UTC+10:00 (AEST)
- Postcode: 4723
Suburbs around Lilyvale
Belcong	Bundoora	Mackenzie River
Crinum	Lilyvale	Mackenzie River
Crinum	Wyuna	Mackenzie River

Lilyvale is a rural locality in the Central Highlands Region, Queensland, Australia. In the 2021 census, Lilyvale had a population of 58 people.

== Geography ==
The locality of Tieri is an enclave within the north-west of the locality of Lilyvale, despite this being contrary to Queensland Government policy.

== Demographics ==
In the 2016 census, Lilyvale had a population of 52 people.

In the 2021 census, Lilyvale had a population of 58 people.

== Education ==
There are no schools in Lilyvale. The nearest government primary schools are Tieri State School in Tieri (an enclave within the north-west of the locality of Lilyvale) and Capella State School in Capella to the west. The nearest government secondary schools are Capella State High School in Capella to the west and Middlemount Community School in Middlemount to the north-east.

However, students living in the south-west of the locality are too distant from these schools for a daily commute. The alternatives are distance education and boarding school.
