= Peak Range National Park =

National park in Queensland, Australia

- IUCN category II (national park)
- Location within Queensland
- Location: Queensland
- Nearest city: Dysart
- Coordinates: 22°28′58″S 147°52′34″E
- Area: 25 km^{2} (9.7 sq mi)
- Established: 1983
- Governing body: Queensland Parks and Wildlife Service

Peak Range is a small national park in Central Queensland, Australia, 760 km northwest of Brisbane. It is located in the Brigalow Belt bioregion.

Two rare threatened plant species and two animal species have been identified in the park. Also found are Trioncinia patens, Dichanthium queenslandicum, the koala and Geophaps scripta scripta.

== See also ==
- Protected areas of Queensland
