= Rio Tinto Coal Australia =

Australian coal mining organisation

- Type: Private
- Industry: Mining
- Headquarters: Brisbane, Australia
- Products: Thermal coal, hard coking coal, semi-soft coking coal

Rio Tinto Coal Australia (RTCA) was an Australian coal mining organisation, that was part of the worldwide Rio Tinto Group. In 2018, Rio Tinto completed the sale of its remaining assets

== RTCA Operations ==
=== RTCA Queensland Operations ===
==== Blair Athol Mine ====
The former mine site will take up to 6 years to rehabilitate, when Rio tinto will get a $84 million bond back.

Blair Athol was closed by former owners Rio Tinto in 2012 and bought in 2014 by New Emerald Coal. TerraCom acquired the Blair Athol mine in 2016 through its subsidiary Orion Mining for just $1 from the Rio Tinto-managed Blair Athol Coal joint venture (BACJV), which had previously paid the Queensland Government nearly $80 million for rehabilitation purposes.

==== Clermont Mine ====
In January 2007, Rio Tinto Coal Australia announced the development of the $950 million, 190-million-tonne thermal coal deposit in Clermont. The mine was estimated to cost A$950 million and was sold to Glencore for A$1.015 billion in 2014.

When the mine reaches full capacity (expected in 2013), it will produce up to 12.2 million tonnes of high quality thermal coal. It is expected to have a life of about 17 years.

Rio Tinto Coal Australia's joint venture partners in the open cut mine are Mitsubishi Development Pty Ltd (31.4 per cent), J-Power Australia Pty Ltd (15 per cent) and JCD Australia Pty Ltd (3.5 per cent).

In May 2020, although the sale agreement was signed in October 2013, mining giant Glencore officially took over management of the Clermont coal mine after completing the $1.015 billion acquisition from Rio Tinto.

==== Kestrel Mine ====
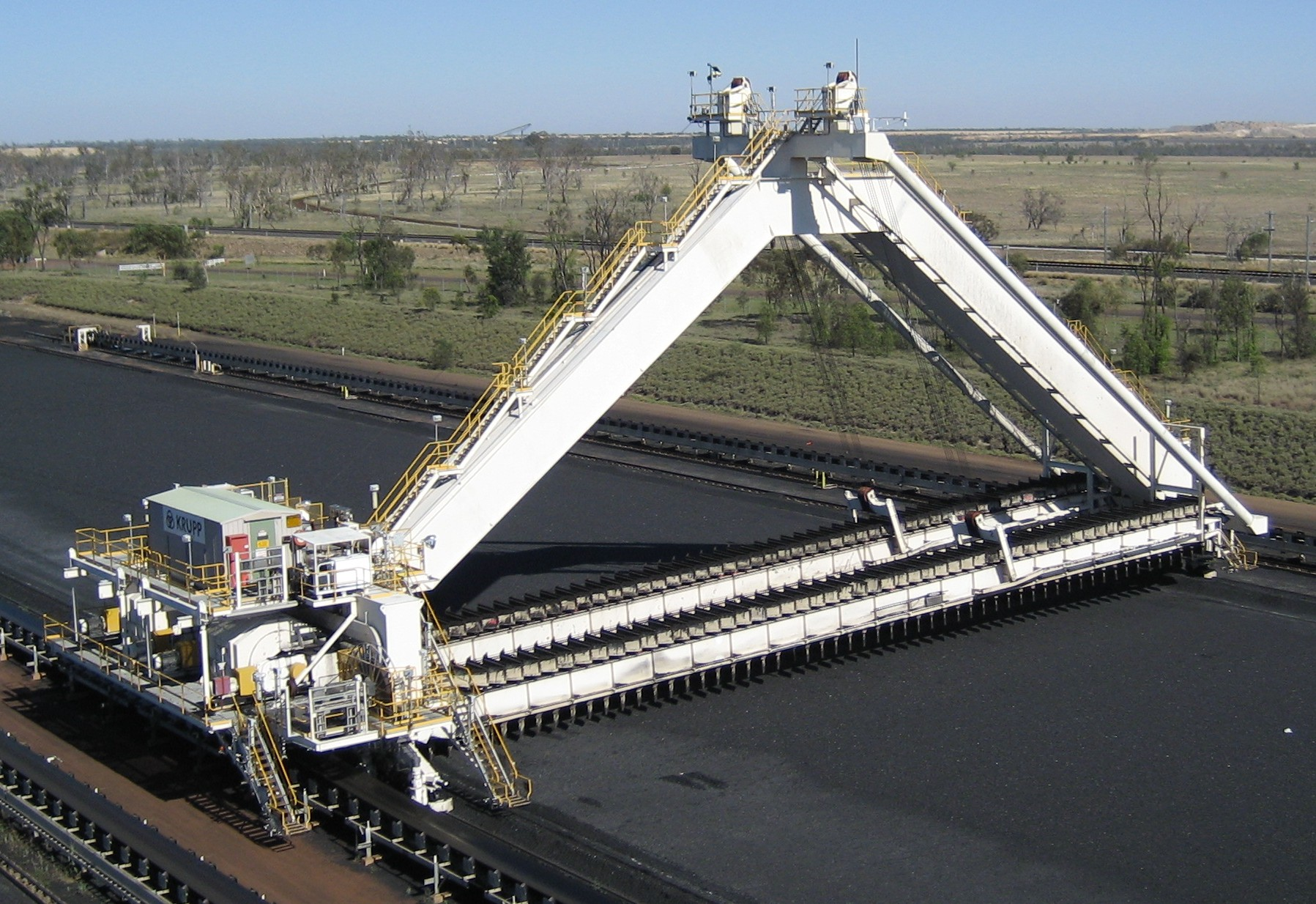
Krupp twin-boom portal reclaimer at RTCA Kestrel Mine

Rio Tinto entered into a binding agreement with a consortium comprising private equity manager EMR Capital (EMR) and PT Adaro Energy Tbk (Adaro), an Indonesian listed coal company, for the sale of its entire 80 per cent interest in the Kestrel underground coal mine for $2.25 billion.

== Coal and Allied Industries: RTCA New South Wales Operations ==
=== HunterValley Operations ===
Hunter Valley Operations is 100 per cent owned by Coal & Allied Industries.

== Sponsorship ==
=== Newcastle Knights ===
Coal & Allied have been the major (naming rights) sponsor for the Newcastle Knights Rugby league team in the National Rugby League competition from 2005 to 2011.

In 2007 the sponsorship was revised and renamed a 'Community Alliance', a partnership arrangement, rather than a sponsorship, designed to identify the genuine needs of communities, particularly those with Indigenous and disadvantaged populations.

Programmes include events, educational and training opportunities, including indigenous student mentoring, junior football clinics, health and wellness programmes for staff and corporate growth opportunities for players beyond the life of their playing careers.

== Community contributions ==
Rio Tinto Coal Australia operated eight community development funds.

Since their inception, Rio Tinto Coal Australia's community development funds contributed approximately $12 million to the communities in which the company operates.

2008 was the final year of funding for four of the funds and towards the end of the year Rio Tinto Coal Australia announced their continuation. This is a commitment of $3 million over three years in each state, Queensland and New South Wales.

In addition, during 2008 and early 2009 Rio Tinto Coal Australia launched three Aboriginal Community Development Funds. The Clermont Aboriginal Community Development Fund, Wiri Yuwiburra Aboriginal Community Benefits Trust and Kestrel Mine Aboriginal Community Development Fund are designed to support projects that work towards providing business, education and training opportunities for the Wiri Yuwiburra, Wangan and Jagalingou and Kangoulu people in Central Queensland.

== See also ==
- Coal in Australia
