= Dysart State High School =

School in Dysart, Queensland, Australia

Location
- Edgerley Street; PO Box 186, Dysart, Queensland, Australia, Queensland 4745; Australia; 22.584576°S 148.353607°E

Information
- Opened: 1982
- Principal: Lyn McDonald
- Faculty: 19
- Grades: 7 to 12
- Enrolment: 150–200 (2018–2019 school year)
- Student to teacher ratio: 10:1
- Website: https://dysartshs.eq.edu.au/
- Developed from a Secondary Department attached to Dysart State School in 1978.

Dysart State High School is a co-educational public high school in Dysart, Central Queensland, Australia, serving grades 7 through 12. Opened in 1982, it was developed from a Secondary Department attached to Dysart State School in 1978.

== Facilities ==
All buildings are fully wheel-chair accessible and have evaporative air-cooling in each classroom. Dysart has specialist Manual Arts, Science, Home Economics facilities as well as an extensive library and two computer laboratories, where Students may use the Connect-Ed program to access the Internet.

== Courses of study ==
Year 8 offers English, Mathematics, Science, Social Science, Health & Physical Education, Manual Arts, Home Economics, Music, Keyboarding, Art and French.

Year 9 and 10 specializes in Manual Arts, Home Economics, Commerce & Computing, Art, Music and Drama, as well as core subjects including English, Math, Science, Social Science and Physical Education.

Senior students are offered Board, Study Area Specification (SAS) and other school subjects within the Senior School. They are also provided with vocational courses as electives. Approximately one-half of graduating students continue on to complete tertiary studies.

== Uniform policy ==
Students are required to wear the prescribed school uniform at all times during the school day and whenever on school premises. Makeup of any kind is strictly forbidden.

== Controversy ==
On 16 June 2016, the school received adverse publicity regarding allegations of apparent bullying. A change.org petition was launched to address claims of bullying of a student and received over 72,000 signatures of support in less than 24 hours.

== See also ==
- Queensland State Schools
- Queensland State High Schools
