= Capella, Queensland =

Capella
- Town
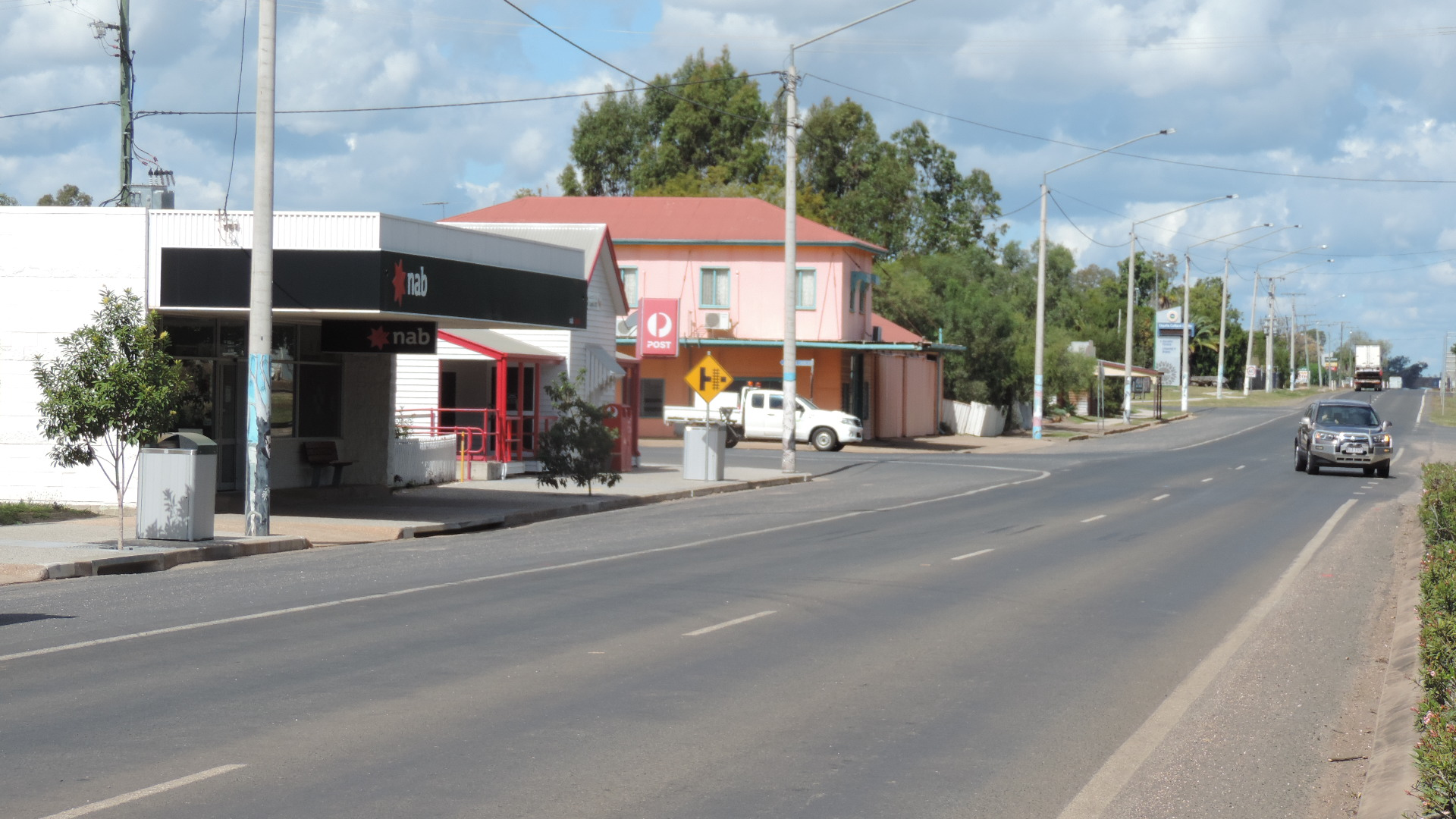
- The Gregory Highway is the main street in Capella, 2016

- Interactive map of Capella
- Coordinates: 23.0834°S 148.0244°E
- Country: Australia
- State: Queensland
- LGA: Central Highlands Region
- Location: 52 km (32 mi) NNW of Emerald; 334 km (208 mi) W of Rockhampton; 883 km (549 mi) NW of Brisbane

Government
  - State electorate: Gregory
  - Federal division: Flynn

Area
  - Total: 9.4 km^{2} (3.6 sq mi)

Population
  - Total: 974 (2021 census)
  - Density: 103.6/km^{2} (268.4/sq mi)
- Time zone: UTC+10:00 (AEST)
- Postcode: 4723
Localities around Capella
Khosh Bulduk	Khosh Bulduk	Belcong
Hibernia	Capella	Belcong
Hibernia	Chirnside	Chirnside

Capella is a rural town and locality in the Central Highlands Region, Queensland, Australia. In the 2021 census, the locality of Capella had a population of 974 people.

== Geography ==
Capella is midway between Emerald and Clermont on the Gregory Highway. The highway, also known as Peak Downs Street, passes through Capella from north to south and is Capella's Main Street. Capella is served by the Capella railway station (23°05′00″S 148°01′17″E) on a railway line from Emerald to Blair Athol; it is a branch line of the Central Western railway line. The branch line also runs from north to south and is immediately adjacent and to the west of the highway.

Capella Creek flows from east to west across the northern part of the locality to the immediate north of the town. Capella Creek is a tributary of the Nogoa River, which in turn is a tributary of the Fitzroy River which enters the Coral Sea.

Despite its name, Capella airport (ICAO: YCEL) is at Airport Road in neighbouring Hibernia but on the boundary with Capella (23.0922°S 148.0068°E). It has a 985-by-10-metre (3,232 by 33 ft) gravel airstrip. It has no lighting, so it is only suitable for daytime use. It is operated by the Central Highlands Regional Council.

== History ==
Capella was founded on traditional Wangan land in the 1860s by graziers influenced by the good reports of Ludwig Leichhardt.

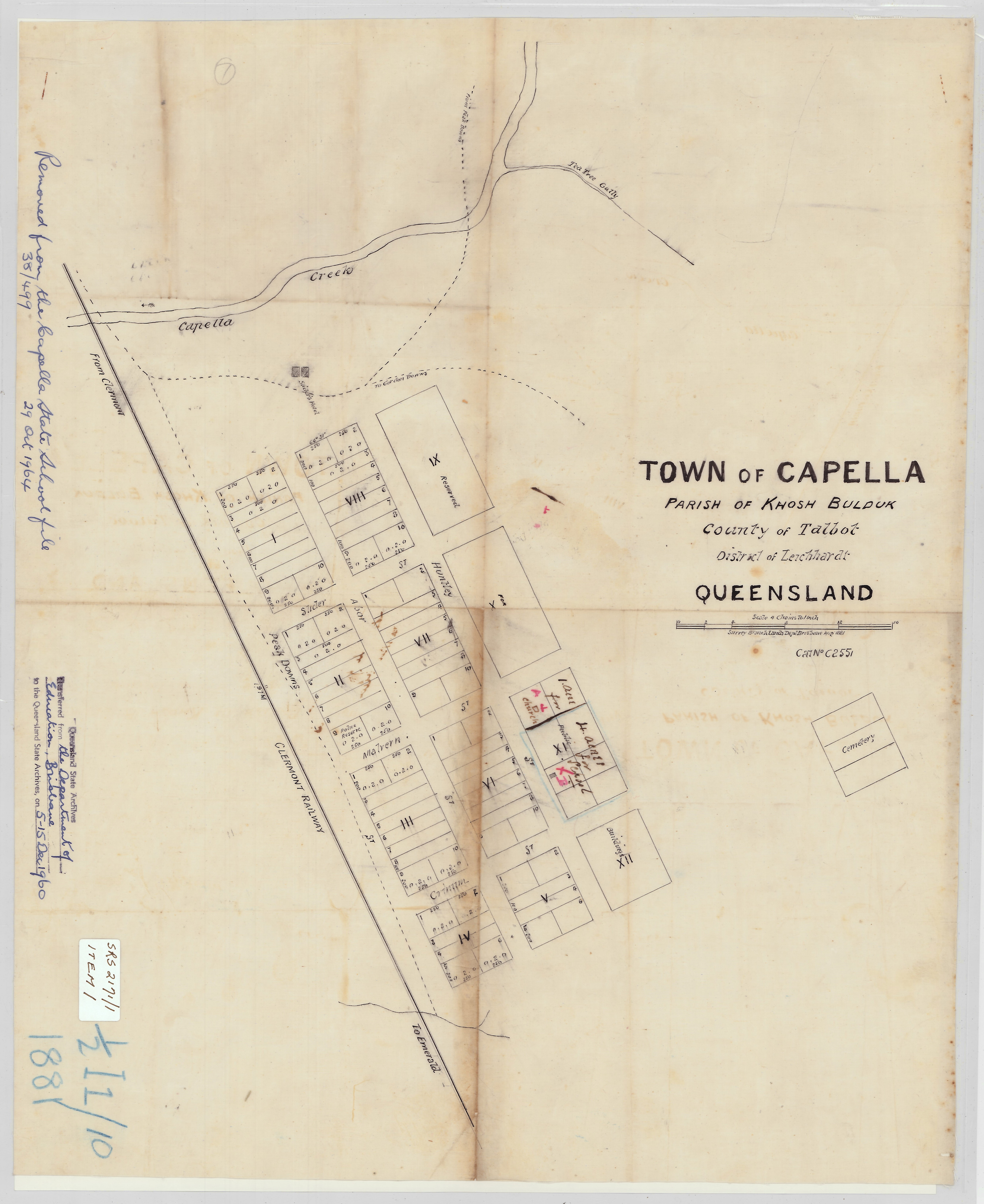
Map of the town of Capella, 1881

The town takes its name from Capella Creek, which was in turn named after the star Capella. The Creek was probably named by surveyor Charles Frederick Gregory who, following the discovery of copper at Copperfield, about 60 kilometres to the north, surveyed three township sites in the Peak Downs area in 1862: Crinum Creek (Lilyvale), Capella, and Hoods Lagoon (Clermont).

The town remained a small roadside stopping place halfway between Emerald, to the south, and Clermont, to the north, until a railway line was built connecting the two larger towns in 1882. The same year saw the establishment of a post office, which opened on 5 December.

In June 1883 Mr Jorgensen was contracted to build a Presbyterian Church and school for £146, to be completed in one month.

Capella Provisional School opened on 29 August 1883. In July 1884 the school had an enrolment of 35 children, and an average attendance of 28 children. In 1900 it became Capella State School. In 1978 a pre-school was added. In 1984 a secondary department was added, but it ceased when Capella State High School opened on 23 January 1989.

Gordon Downs Provisional School opened circa 1885 and closed circa 1886.

Land resumed from large pastoral runs was made available to small farm selectors in 1883 and small cropping and dairying became early industries; a Butter Factory was built in 1900 under the "Meat and Diary Encouragement Act."

From 1894 Wesleyan Methodist services were held at Capella State School by Reverend Taylor, minister of the Wesleyan Church in Clermont. On 2 May 1898, Reverend J.R. Williams, based at Clermont, held the first Wesleyan service in the Capella church.

By the late 1890s it was reported that "great improvements have been made at this place of late": in 1898 new offices for the Peak Downs Divisional Board (the fore-runner of the Peak Downs Shire Council) were opened, a number of new shops had been built, and the Old Exchange Hotel and the Peak Downs Hotel were renovated and re-opened.

Mrs Lucy Stuart of Gordon Downs Station laid the foundation block for the Holy Spirit Anglican Church on Easter Monday 1 April 1907. The church was opened on 23 October 1907.

The early 20th century was a time of stable growth and development in the town, although the population only increased from about 250 in 1900 to 300 in 1930. The 1920s saw a great deal of building. Mrs M.J. Walsh opened a café in October 1925 and a bakery opened shortly thereafter. A new Roman Catholic church, St Joseph's, seating 200 people, was dedicated in April 1926 by Bishop Sheil. The same year also saw a new hall, picture theatre and Country Women's Association clubrooms built. A branch of the Queensland National Bank opened in 1930, and a new Catholic presbytery was built. The town became the council seat of the Shire of Peak Downs in 1927 and a new Shire Hall was built in 1936. The mid 1930s also saw the town's main streets kerbed and channelled and a "bitumen emulsion paved footpath" laid in the main street, Peak Downs Street.

A town electricity supply was introduced in December 1954, although other services had to wait for another decade or more, being introduced between 1962 (a town water supply) and 1982 (mains sewerage).

In the 1950s the Queensland British Food Corporation introduced large-scale grain production into the district on land formerly used for grazing. A run of poor seasons led to the project's failure, but it introduced new crops such as sunflower and sorghum.

The Capella Hotel, on the corner of Peak Downs and Crinum Streets, was built in 1955. This was the site of the former Commercial Hotel, built in 1929, which was destroyed by fire in February 1943. The destruction of the Commercial left the town with only one other hotel and the Peak Downs Shire Council, realising the need to provide additional accommodation for visitors to the town, undertook to build the hotel as a function of local government. Several local authorities in Queensland built and ran their own licensed premises in the 1950s, including Rockhampton, Townsville and Winton. The new Capella Hotel was designed by Mr E.A. Hegvold and built by J.J. Booker and Sons at a cost of £33,000. The hotel was officially opened on 7 May 1955.

The Peak Downs district was part of the Brigalow Development Scheme in the 1960s with large-scale clearing of the brigalow scrub by mechanical means. The large new farming blocks opened up by the clearing of the Brigalow lent itself to the broadland growing of grain and cereal crops, particularly sunflower and sorghum. Bulk storage facilities for these new crops was built in 1964 and the population of the district increased with new farming families. Capella saw the opening of a range of new activities and facilities, including a district agricultural show (1961), Girl Guides (1966), and a swimming pool (1969).

Coal was discovered at Tieri, about 36 kilometres east of Capella, in 1982 and a large open-cut mine was developed. The mine boosted the economy of the area and the 1980s saw a number of new developments and buildings in Capella, including the Capella Cultural Centre and a pioneer village.

Capella State High School opened on 23 January 1989, replacing the secondary department at Capella State School.

In 2003 the security of Capella's water supply was assured by a pipeline to Tieri.

In 2008 the Shire of Peak Downs was amalgamated into the Central Highlands Regional Shire, with its seat in Emerald.

== Demographics ==
In the 2006 census, the town of Capella had a population of 796 people.

In the 2011 census, the locality of Capella had a population of 926 people.

In the 2016 census, the locality of Capella had a population of 1,010 people.

In the 2021 census, the locality of Capella had a population of 974 people.

== Heritage listings ==
Capella has a number of nearby heritage-listed sites, including:

- Lilyvale Stand Monument, Lilyvale Road, Crinum

== Economy ==
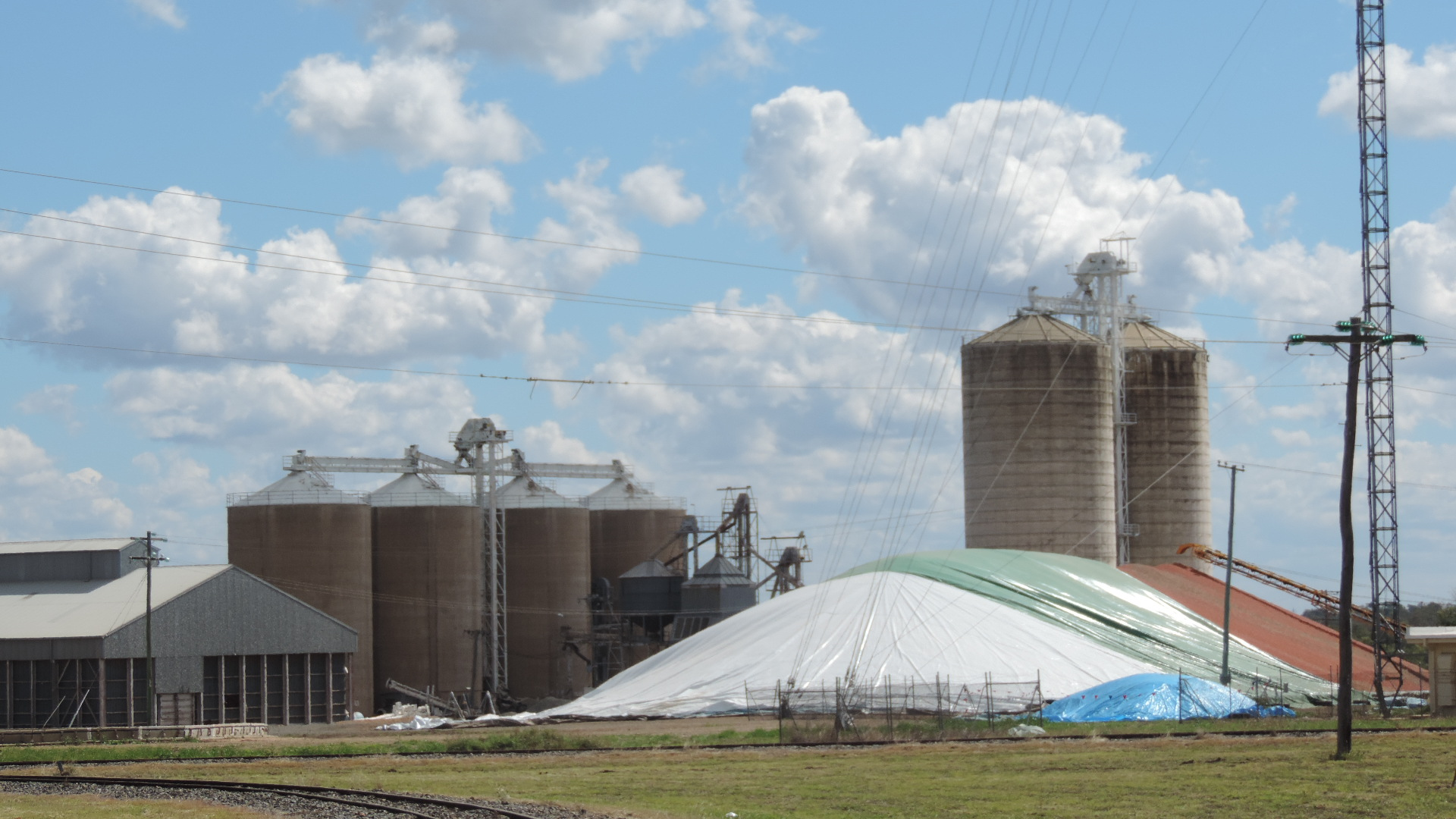
Grain silos and stockpiles at Capella, 2016

Capella is a service town catering to the large coal-mining interests in the area as well as pastoralists and farmers.

GrainCorp have a receiving depot (23.0832°S 148.0198°E) beside Capella railway station for crops such as sorghum, wheat, chickpea and barley.

== Education ==
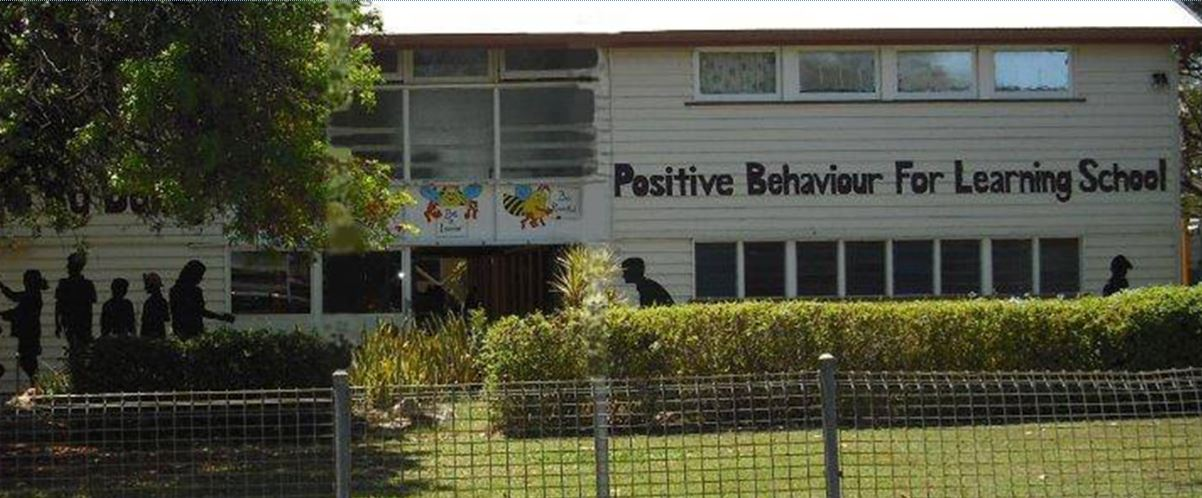
Capella State School, 2024

Capella State School is a government primary (Prep–6) school for boys and girls at 41 Huntley Street (23.0826°S 148.0247°E). In 2018, the school had an enrolment of 171 students with 13 teachers (11 full-time equivalent) and 14 non-teaching staff (7 full-time equivalent).

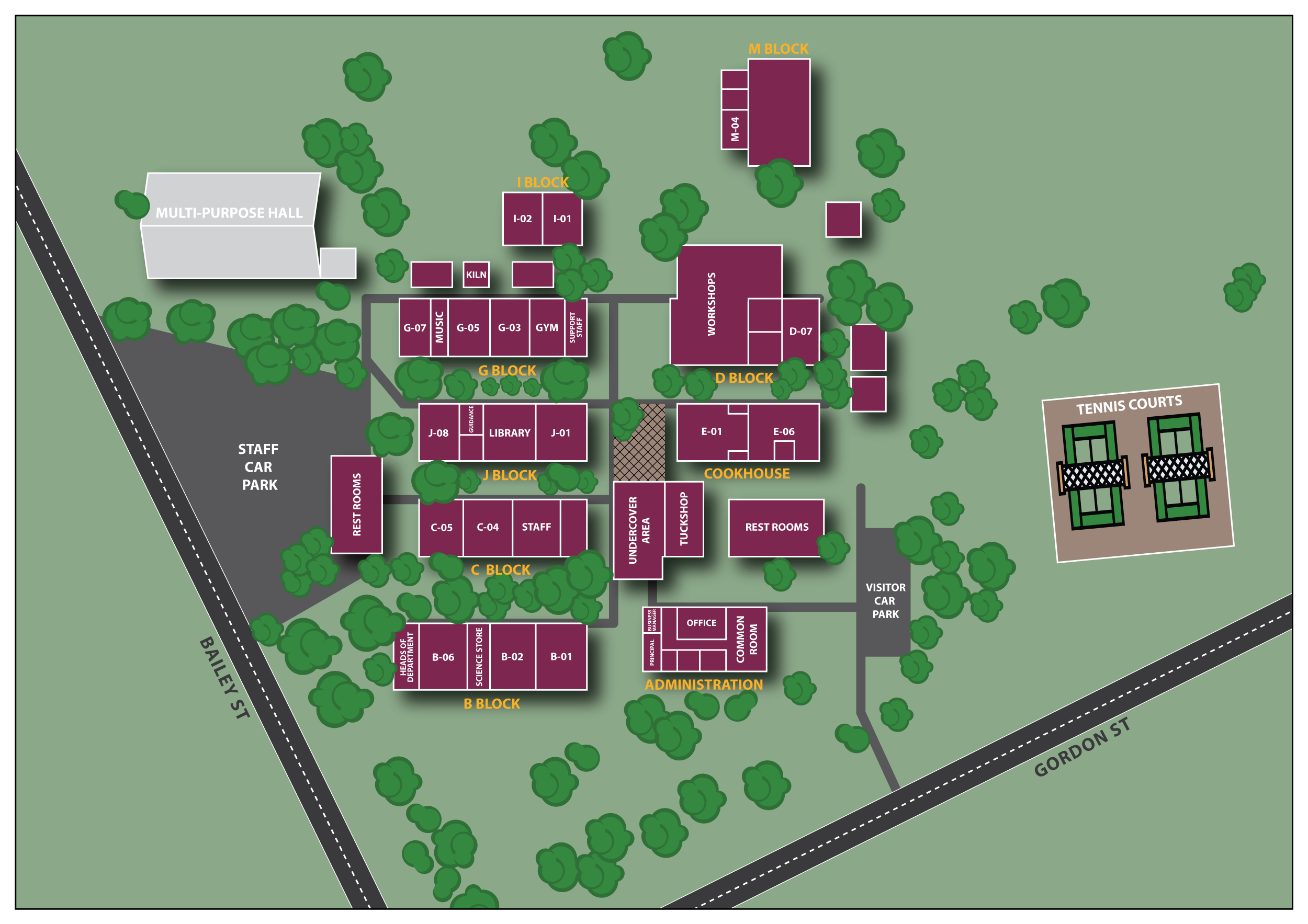
Map of Capella State High School, 2024

Capella State High School is a government secondary (7–12) school for boys and girls at 35-45 Gordon Street (23.0881°S 148.0304°E). In 2018, the school had an enrolment of 110 students with 18 teachers (15 full-time equivalent) and 13 non-teaching staff (8 full-time equivalent). It includes a special education program.

== Facilities ==
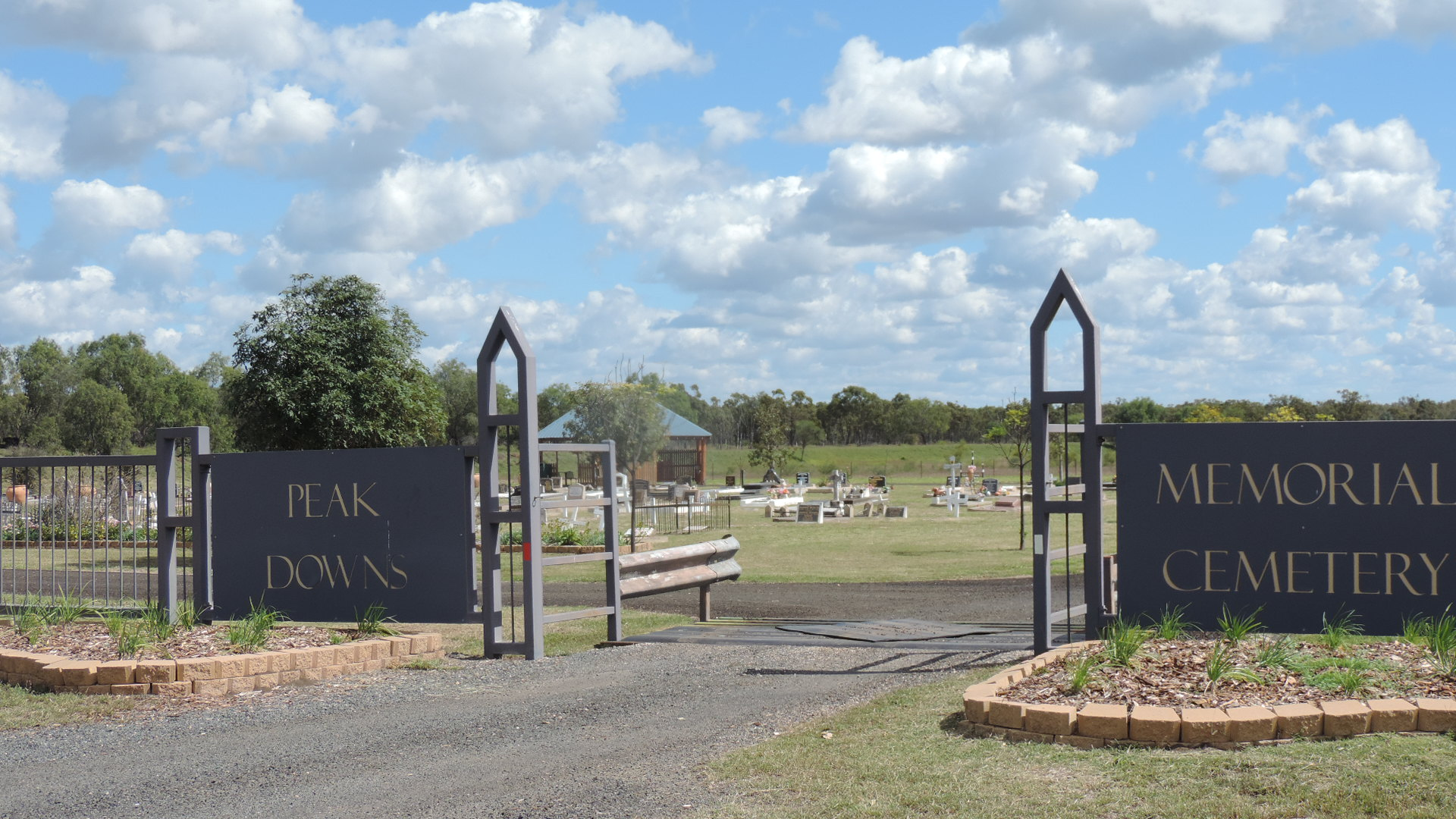
Peak Downs cemetery, 2016

Capella Police Station is at 35 Huntley Street (23.0813°S 148.0244°E).

Capella Fire Station is at 18 Conran Street (23.0857°S 148.0252°E).

Capella SES Facility is at 20 Hibernia Road (23.0870°S 148.0203°E).

Capella Outpatients Clinic is at 5 Slider Street (23.0803°S 148.0220°E). It is one of the Central Queensland Rural Outpatient Clinics.

Capella Ambulance Station is at 9 Gordon Street (23.0895°S 148.0255°E).

The Peak Downs Shire cemetery is located in Walsh Street, Capella (23.0806°S 148.0090°E). It has a memorial listing those who were buried in the first Capella Cemetery (1865-1899) located east of Capella.

== Amenities ==
The Central Highlands Regional Council operates Capella Library at 83 Peak Downs Street (23.0866°S 148.0237°E).

Capella Cultural Centre is an entertainment centre at 89 Peak Downs Street (23.0878°S 148.0243°E) capable of seating up to 500 people in its main auditorium. It serves as a cinema, a conference venue and has a program of touring entertainers.

Bridgeman Park Sporting Complex at 23 Hibernia Road (23.0875°S 148.0163°E) contains the Capella Showgrounds, polocrosse fields, football fields, a cricket pitch, and a covered arena. It has powered camping facilities, stables and stockyards, and a dining area with bar. Regular activities include campdrafting, polocrosse, rugby league, rugby union, and cricket.

Capella Aquatic Centre is a swimming pool and fitness complex at 107 Peak Downs Street (23.0883°S 148.0243°E). It has swimming pools, waterslides, gymnasium and squash courts, as well as a cafe and barbeque facilities.

The Capella branch of the Queensland Country Women's Association meets at the QCWA Hall at 87 Peak Downs Street (23.0870°S 148.0237°E).

Holy Spirit Anglican Church is at 32 Conran Street (corner of Burn Street, 23.0855°S 148.0266°E). It is within the Clermont Parish of the Anglican Church Central Queensland.

St Joseph's Catholic Church is at 59 Abor Street (23.0848°S 148.0242°E). It is within the Capella Tieri parish of the Roman Catholic Diocese of Rockhampton.

Capella Uniting Church is at 43 Huntley Street (23.0834°S 148.0251°E).

== Events ==
There is an annual campdraft event in March as part of a larger regional program of campdraft events.

The Capella Show is held annually in May.

The Capella Polocrosse Carnival is held annually in July.

The Capella Cattledogs are the local rugby union team which compete in the Central Highlands Rugby Union competition which runs from March to September.

The Peak Downs Pirates are local rugby league team which compete in the Central Highlands Rugby League competition.

== Attractions ==
Capella Pioneer Village is a museum in Pioneer Street (23.0790°S 148.0194°E). It is located in Australia's largest restored drop-plank construction homestead with over 5,000 artefacts grouped into themed exhibits.
