= Barcaldine Shire Hall =

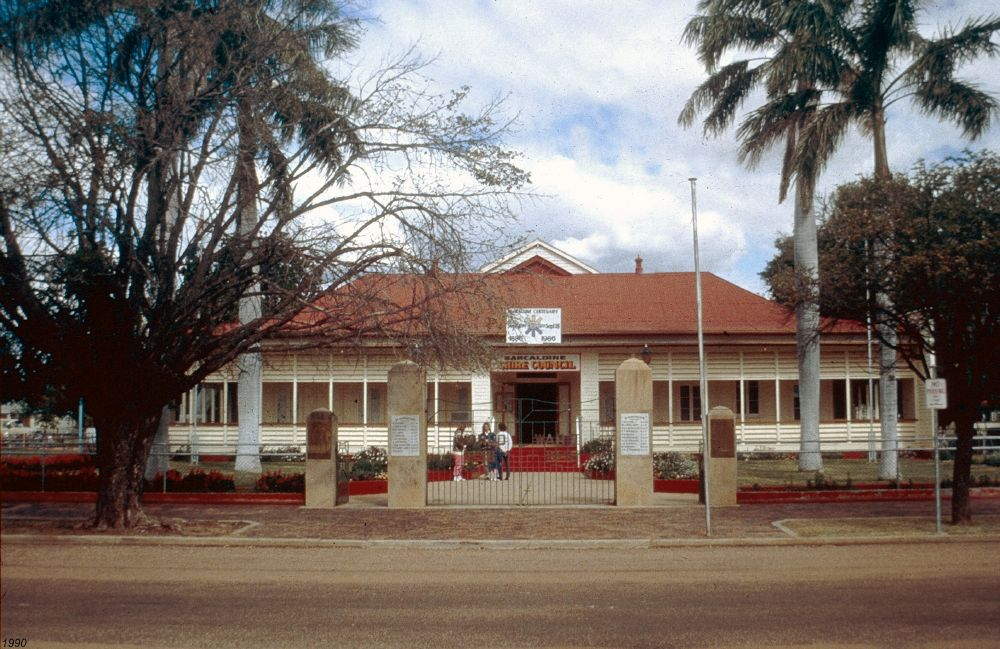
- Barcaldine Shire Hall, 1990

- Location within Queensland Location within Australia
- Interactive map of Barcaldine Shire Hall
- 23.5542°S 145.289°E
- Location: Ash Street, Barcaldine, Queensland, Australia

History
- Design period: 1900–1914 (early 20th century)
- Built: 1911–1912
- Built for: Barcaldine Shire Council

Site notes
- Architect: Alfred Mowbray Hutton
- Architectural style: Classicism

Queensland Heritage Register
- Official name: Barcaldine Shire Hall & Offices
- Type: state heritage (built, landscape)
- Designated: 29 April 2003
- Reference no.: 601274
- Significant period: 1910s (historical); 1910s (fabric); 1911–ongoing (social)
- Significant components: views to, hall, memorial – gate/s, trees/plantings, furniture/fittings, council chamber/meeting room
- Builders: Robinson & Freeman

Barcaldine Shire Hall is a heritage-listed town hall at Ash Street, Barcaldine, Queensland, Australia. It was designed by Alfred Mowbray Hutton and built from 1911 to 1912 by Robinson & Freeman. It was added to the Queensland Heritage Register on 29 April 2003.

== History ==
The present Barcaldine Shire Hall was built in 1911–1912 and is the second official building used by the Council for the administration of the Shire of Barcaldine. The building was designed by Alfred Mowbray Hutton. Major alterations were made to the building in 1952.

The town of Barcaldine developed almost "overnight" in 1886 with the extension of the Central Western Railway west from Rockhampton. The railway was a vital factor in opening up the central western regions of Queensland to European settlement in the mid to late nineteenth century. The original site of the terminus was to have been the pastoral station of Barcaldine Downs, established by pastoralist Donald Cameron in 1865. It was eventually decided to locate the terminus at Lagoon Creek however.

Barcaldine rapidly grew to prosperity, on a permanent scale, unlike most of the other railway townships on the central line. The town was surveyed by Victor Desgrand, the Government Surveyor, in July 1885 and sales of town lots were held in December. The town was laid out on a rectangular grid, parallel to and south of the railway line. A town reserve of 100 square miles (260 km^{2}) was gazetted in June 1886, when further allotments of land were sold. The railway was not officially opened until December 1886, by which time the town had already "assumed formidable proportions". After a year of official European settlement, the population of Barcaldine in 1887 was estimated at 1500.

The Divisional Boards Act of 1879 brought local government into the outback of Queensland. The Kargoolnah Divisional Board was created in this year and centred on Blackall, an early pastoral township. The geographical area serviced by this board covered a great area in western Queensland, taking in the future towns of Tambo, Barcaldine and Jericho. With Barcaldine developed rapidly from 1886, the residents formed the Barcaldine Progress Association, and began agitating for their own municipal representation. In 1893, a Divisional Board at Barcaldine was instituted, which was to evolve into the Barcaldine Shire Council.

At first the Barcaldine Divisional Board met in a building in Oak Street, but the building was burnt down during a fire in the town in 1896. It was decided to construct a hall to the design of the Rockhampton architects, Eaton & Bates. Completed in May 1898, the hall was located on the south-eastern corner of Ash and Beech Streets in the Divisional Board Reserve. This building served the community more than adequately into the twentieth century, witnessing the administrative changeover from Divisional Board to Shire Council in 1903. By the early years of the new century however, it was apparent that the hall was too small for the administration of the shire.

In 1911 the council commissioned the architect A. M. Hutton to design a new building for the Shire Hall and Offices. Hutton died shortly after completing the plans. The design was then taken over by Frederick Boddington, Hutton's partner. Robinson & Freeman, builders of Rockhampton, submitted the only tender, which was accepted with a price of £2675. The new hall was planned to be completed to coincide with the silver anniversary celebrations of the settling of the town. Delays were encountered in its construction before the hall was completed in February 1912. It appears it was constructed adjacent to the former hall, which was then purchased by the Aramac Shire Council for £500 and removed.

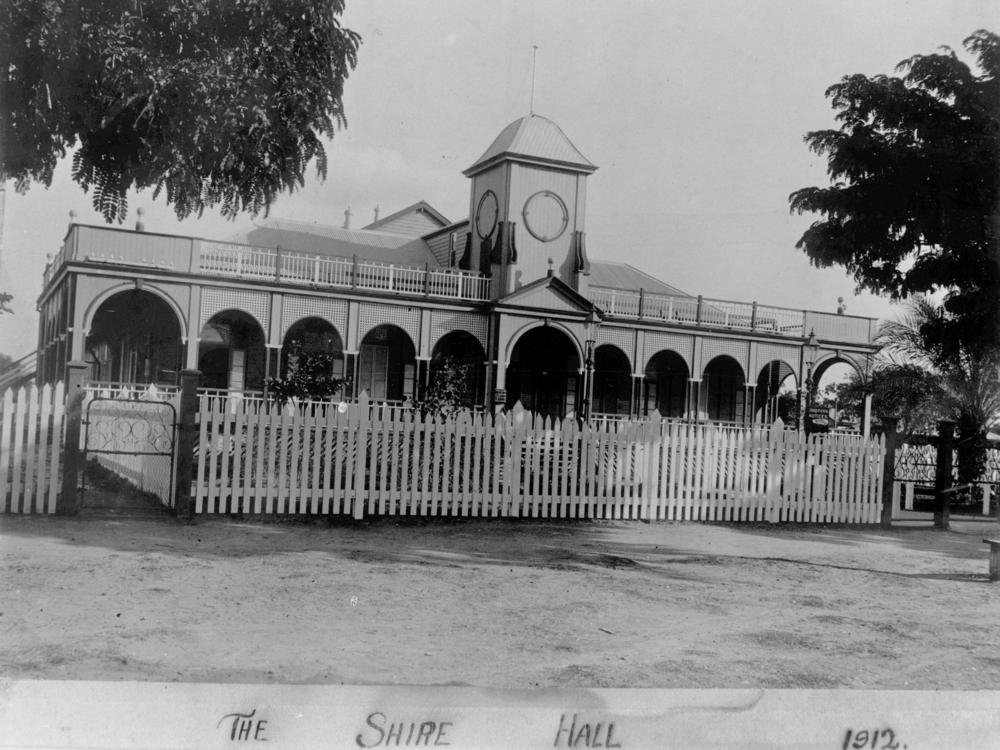
Barcaldine Shire Hall newly built, 1912

The 1912 building was constructed largely as designed by Hutton although there were a number of slight modifications. It was built of timber with a corrugated iron roof, with the official rooms of the council at the front section, and the hall behind. The offices were designed as a separate but linked pavilion, with a single skin wall. They were surrounded by verandahs at the front and sides, with a 6-foot (1.8 m) wide passage separating them from the hall. The main entrance to the building was identified by a large triangular pediment which capped an archway. The clock tower rose above the entrance in the centre of the building. Pediments were installed each end of the front verandah. Between these and the entrance, the verandah was divided into four bays with a lattice valance forming complimentary arches across the face of the building. Side verandahs to the office section were also treated similarly.

The council rooms opened out to the verandah on all sides with the French doors and casement windows. The Council Chambers and Shire Chairman's office were to the right of the central passage, and the offices for the Shire Clerk and a solicitor to the left. The floors of these rooms were generally covered in linoleum, with green or grey walls and white pressed metal ceilings. At the end of the central passage through two sets of double doors was located the hall. The hall featured a flat floor with a raised stage, and an upstairs gallery. The hall opened sideways onto the subsidiary verandah spaces. On the eastern verandah was a supper room, on the western were smoking rooms and toilets. The hall was of large proportions, measuring 80 by 40 feet (24 by 12 m), and was well ventilated with vents and louvres, and fanlights which acted as a clerestory providing light and ventilation over the adjoining verandah roofs.

The gallery of the hall was reached through a staircase in the front section of the building. A passageway provided access from this gallery, out to the clock tower and along a viewing deck which sat above the verandahs of the office section.

The Shire Hall was officially opened on Friday 8 March 1912 by Shire Chairman James Cronin. It was a joint celebration with the town's silver jubilee and was attended by an estimated 1,000 people.

The Barcaldine Shire Hall was the principal public building in the town. The hall was used by most citizens of the shire in some capacity, for fundraising activities, as a public venue, to attend meetings, for the associated operations in the efforts of two world wars, for the health and welfare of the people, and many other events.

In 1952 the Shire Hall underwent some rather major alterations, documented by the Brisbane architect Charles William Thomas Fulton with Aubrey Horswill Job & James Musgrave Collin architects in association. The major change involved the demolition and removal of the clock tower and the promenade deck. The decorative front and side verandah to the office was also removed, and replaced with a new verandah design. The east verandah of the hall, which contained the supper room, was also partially rebuilt. New toilet facilities were added within the west verandah, which was also enclosed. The hall was also repainted, a new ticket office was installed, and memorial gates at the entrance were later built. These gates were planned by the Barcaldine War Memorial Committee and included plaques bearing the names of those from the district who enlisted and those who died in World War II.

In 1993 a conservation study of the Barcaldine Shire Hall was prepared for the Barcaldine Shire Council. In the mid-1990s, two new freestanding buildings were erected, one either side of the 1911–12 building at the front, and linked to it, providing new shire council offices and a new shire library.

== Description ==
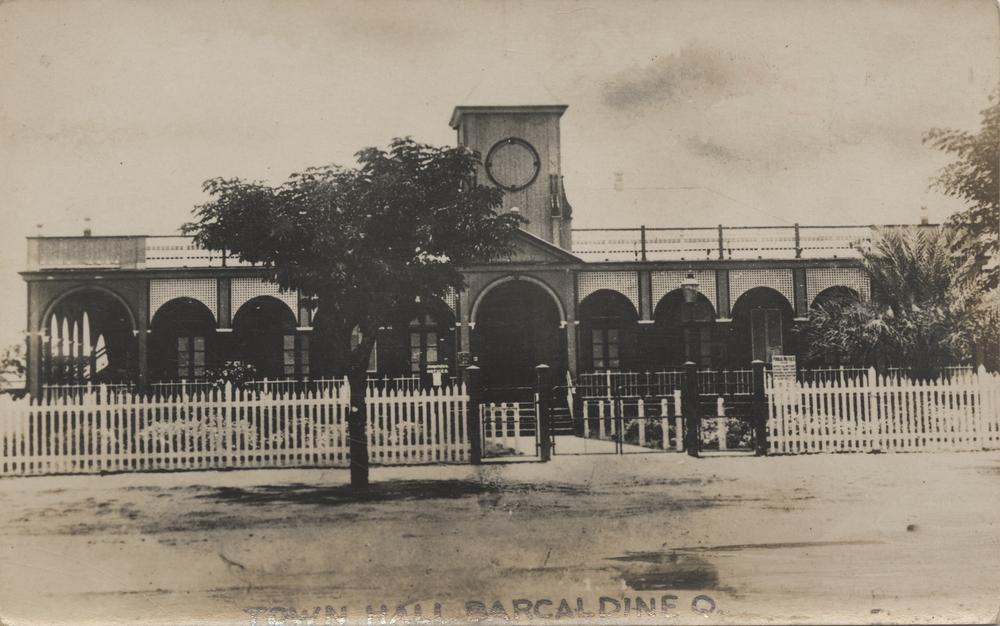
Shire Hall, circa 1920

The Barcaldine Shire Hall and Offices are built of timber with a corrugated iron roof, with the official rooms of the council at the front section, with the hall behind. The building lies in the administration precinct of Barcaldine, fronting Ash Street and bounded by Beech Street. It shares the town block with other government buildings, including the Court House; while the Post Office sits on the opposite (south-western) corner of Ash and Beech Streets. The hall and offices structure is well set back from both streets, and is centrally located within the government reserve. The site contains significant plantings which also line the street boundaries. Memorial gates dedicated to those who enlisted and those who died are located in front of the main entrance to the building.

In fabric, scale, and design, the building has not changed since the completion of the 1950s renovations. Much original joinery in the building survives basically intact, as does much of the original interior linings, including the stamped steel ceilings and beaded tongue and groove wall boards.

== Heritage listing ==
The Barcaldine Shire Hall was listed on the Queensland Heritage Register on 29 April 2003 having satisfied the following criteria.

The place is important in demonstrating the evolution or pattern of Queensland's history.

The building is significant as it demonstrates the growth and development of Barcaldine. It is significant as the major public building in the town for more than 80 years. The building is on the original Divisional Board Reserve, surveyed when the town was set out in 1885, and helps to define the town's original surveying. The Barcaldine Shire Hall and Offices is also important in demonstrating the modernising influence of the 1950s, with its extensive additions and alterations of that time.

The place demonstrates rare, uncommon or endangered aspects of Queensland's cultural heritage.

The building is significant as a rare surviving example of a late nineteenth/early twentieth century timber shire hall, many of which were constructed but few of which survive.

The place is important because of its aesthetic significance.

The site is significant for its architecture, particularly its interesting plan form.

The place has a strong or special association with a particular community or cultural group for social, cultural or spiritual reasons.

The place has a strong association with the Barcaldine Community, being the centre for local government and the central social venue of the town, and having been used by most of the citizens of the shire in some capacity. The site has further significance to the Barcaldine community as it contains memorial gates erected by the Barcaldine War Memorial Committee following World War II.
