= Tieri War Memorial =

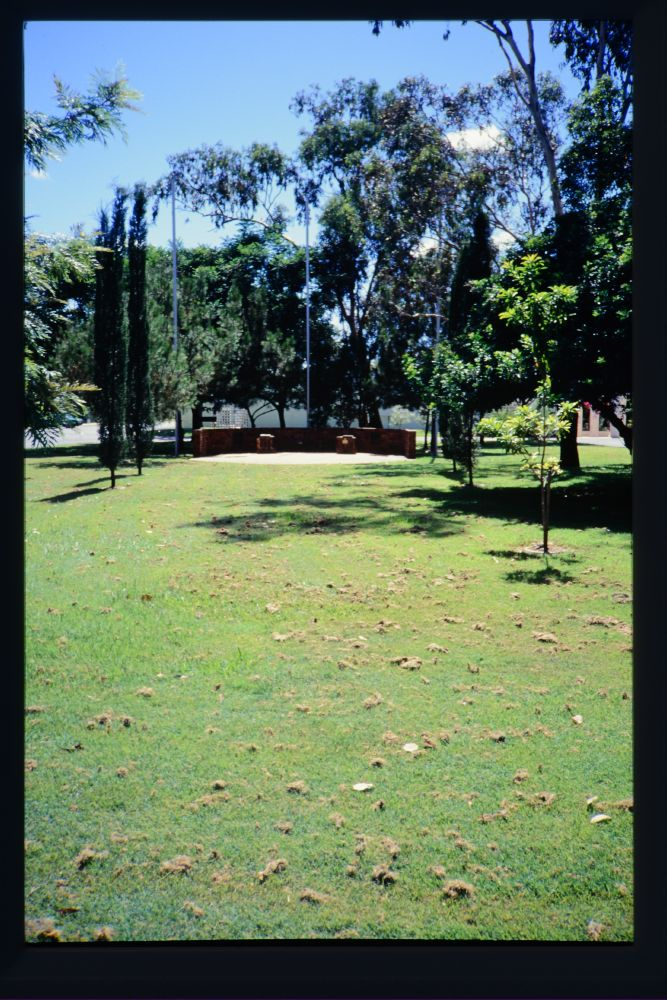
- Tieri War Memorial, 2006

- Location within Queensland Location within Australia
- 23.035°S 148.3427°E
- Location: Talagai Avenue, Tieri, Central Highlands Region, Queensland, Australia

History
- Built: 1984

Queensland Heritage Register
- Official name: Tieri War Memorial
- Type: state heritage (built)
- Designated: 29 June 2001
- Reference no.: 602184
- Significant period: 1980s (fabric); 1984–ongoing (social)
- Significant components: memorial – plaque, trees/plantings, tree groups – avenue of, memorial/monument, flagpole/flagstaff, memorial – wall

Tieri War Memorial is a heritage-listed memorial at Talagai Avenue, Tieri, Central Highlands Region, Queensland, Australia. It was built in 1984. It was added to the Queensland Heritage Register on 29 June 2001.

== History ==
The Tieri War Memorial was constructed in 1984 in memory of those servicemen and women from the Peak Downs area who served in a number of conflicts, but especially as a memorial to those who served in the Vietnam War.

The construction of the memorial came about when two Vietnam veterans met in Capella on ANZAC Day in 1983. At first, neither was aware that the other had served in Vietnam as they were not wearing their medals. This was due to the public feeling conflicted with the Vietnam War at the time. By the end of that day, however, the two had decided to hold the next ANZAC Day celebrations in Tieri.

It took several months to decide on an appropriate memorial which could be placed in the town. During the year, one of the Veterans located a large petrified tree and a piece of this was brought into the town and set up in the shopping centre. Following the ANZAC Day celebrations in 1984, it was decided that the shopping centre was not a suitable location for the memorial.

With assistance from Mount Isa Mines Limited, who provided the site and paid for the construction, the present Tieri War Memorial was completed. Since its construction, many returned servicemen and women have visited the memorial, particularly to commemorate ANZAC Day (25 April) and Long Tan Day (18 August).

== Description ==
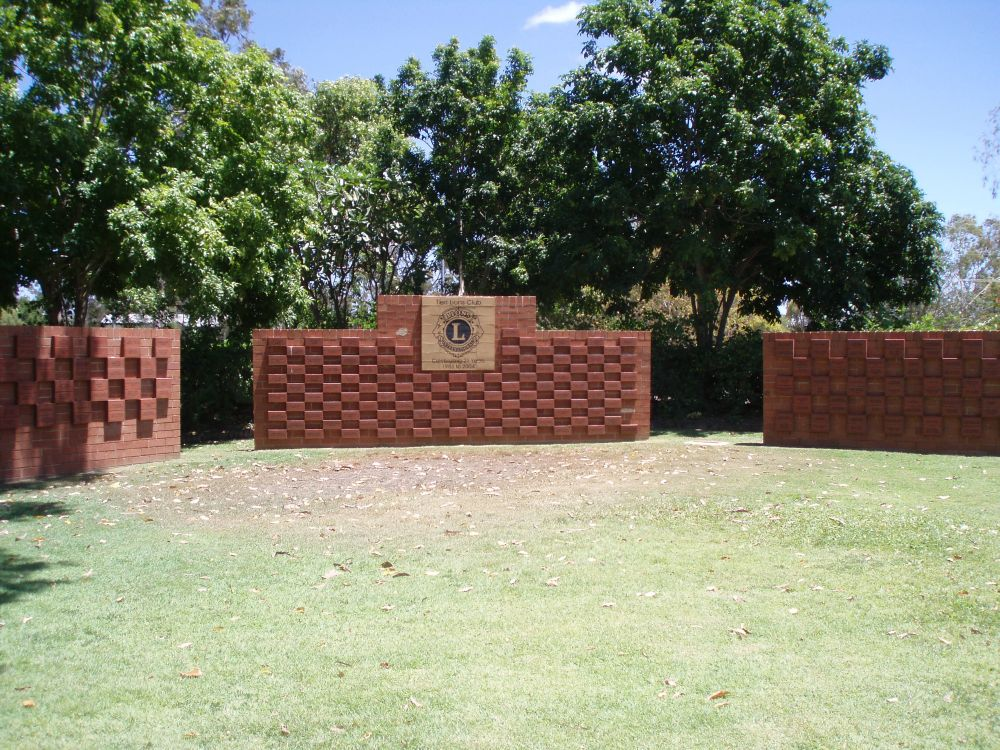
Brick walls, 2006

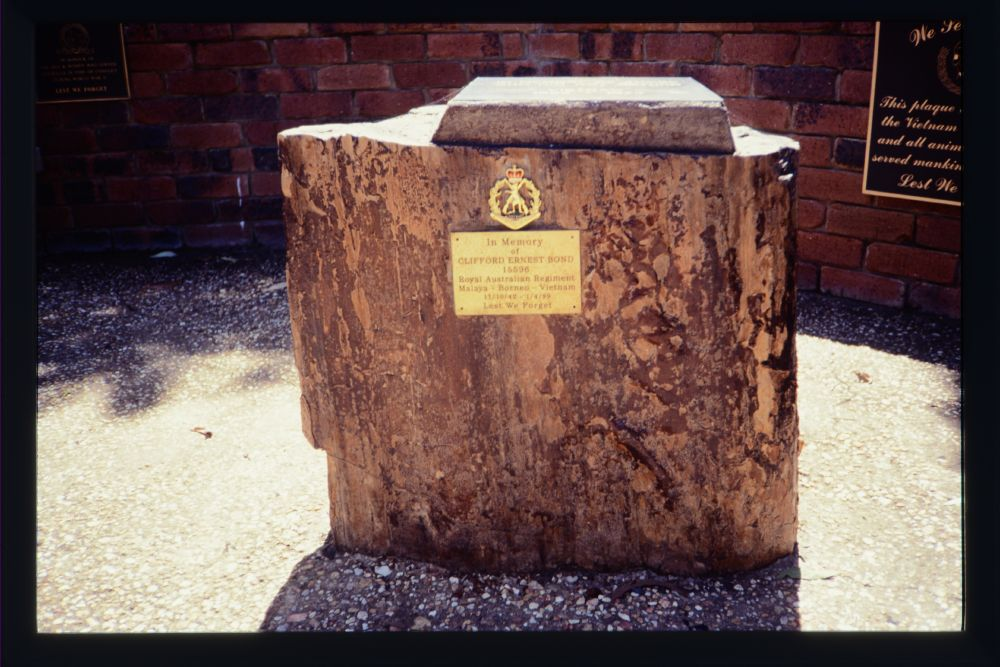
Memorial for "Cliffy" Bond, 2006

The Tieri War Memorial comprises two large pieces of petrified wood. One piece is dedicated as a memorial to those who fought in World War I and World War II and the second piece is dedicated as a memorial to those who served in the Vietnam War, including a brass plaque dedicated to the memory of Cliff ('Cliffy') Bond, who served in Vietnam, Malaya and Borneo.

The petrified pieces are partly enclosed on one side by a low brick wall. A number of plaques are located on the wall. One plaque commemorates those from the Peak Downs area who served in World Wars One and Two. A second plaque commemorates the tracker dogs of the Vietnam War, (including the names of the eleven dogs) and a third plaque commemorates VJ Day.

A group of pencil pines create an avenue toward the memorial and a number of Gallipoli pines are located to the rear of the structure. Flag poles are also located to the rear of the memorial.

== Heritage listing ==
Tieri War Memorial was listed on the Queensland Heritage Register on 29 June 2001 having satisfied the following criteria.

The place is important in demonstrating the evolution or pattern of Queensland's history.

War Memorials are important in demonstrating the pattern of Queensland's history as they are representative of a recurrent theme that involved most communities throughout the state.

The place is important in demonstrating the principal characteristics of a particular class of cultural places.

The memorial at Tieri demonstrates the principal characteristics of a commemorative structure erected as an enduring record of a major historical event. This is achieved through the appropriate use of various elements, particularly commemorative plaques and trees, as well as the more unusual use of petrified wood.

The place has a strong or special association with a particular community or cultural group for social, cultural or spiritual reasons.

The Tieri War Memorial is especially significant for its strong and continuing association with the community as evidence of the impact of major historic events and as the focal point for the remembrance of those events, particularly as a memorial to those who served in the Vietnam War.
