= Rockhampton nightclub bombings =

1989 and 1990 bombings in Rockhampton, Queensland

The Rockhampton nightclub bombings consisted of two separate incidents that occurred in Rockhampton, Queensland in November 1989 and June 1990 where two nightclubs in the city centre were bombed. It has never been confirmed whether there were any links between the two events.

== Shark Nightclub ==
At 3:05 am on 10 November 1989, an explosion occurred at the Shark Nightclub in Bolsover Street. Upon emergency services arriving at the scene, another explosion occurred, injuring two police officers—Police Constable John Dallow and Senior Constable Jeff Dawson—and firefighter Trevor Kidd.

While Dallow and Dawson were both released from hospital soon after the incident, Kidd spent twelve weeks recovering from his injuries in hospital.

The explosions caused significant structural damage to the building at 131 Bolsover Street, which was repaired.

== Factory Nightclub ==
At 4:10 am on 28 June 1990, an explosion occurred at the Factory Nightclub in the Headrick's Building at 189 East Street. Buildings in the immediate vicinity were evacuated, including the local ABC station in Quay Street where Andrew Lofthouse was due to begin his first shift.

Investigations later revealed that one of the devices that had been planted within the building had failed to detonate which had been the only factor that had prevented the entire building from being destroyed.

Following the explosion, police found 29 sticks of unexploded gelignite in the nightclub.

== Rewards ==
The two bombings remain unsolved crimes.

In 2014, the Queensland Police Service advised that the Minister for Police had approved two $50,000 rewards for information which led to the apprehension and conviction of those responsible for each bombing.

In both cases, an indemnity was also offered to any accomplice not directly involved who gives information about either crime.
