= Town of Blackall =

Local government area of Queensland, Australia

Coordinates: 24.41°S 145.47°E

The Town of Blackall was a local government area located in central Queensland, for the purposes of governing the town of Blackall. It exists from 1880 to 1931.

== History ==
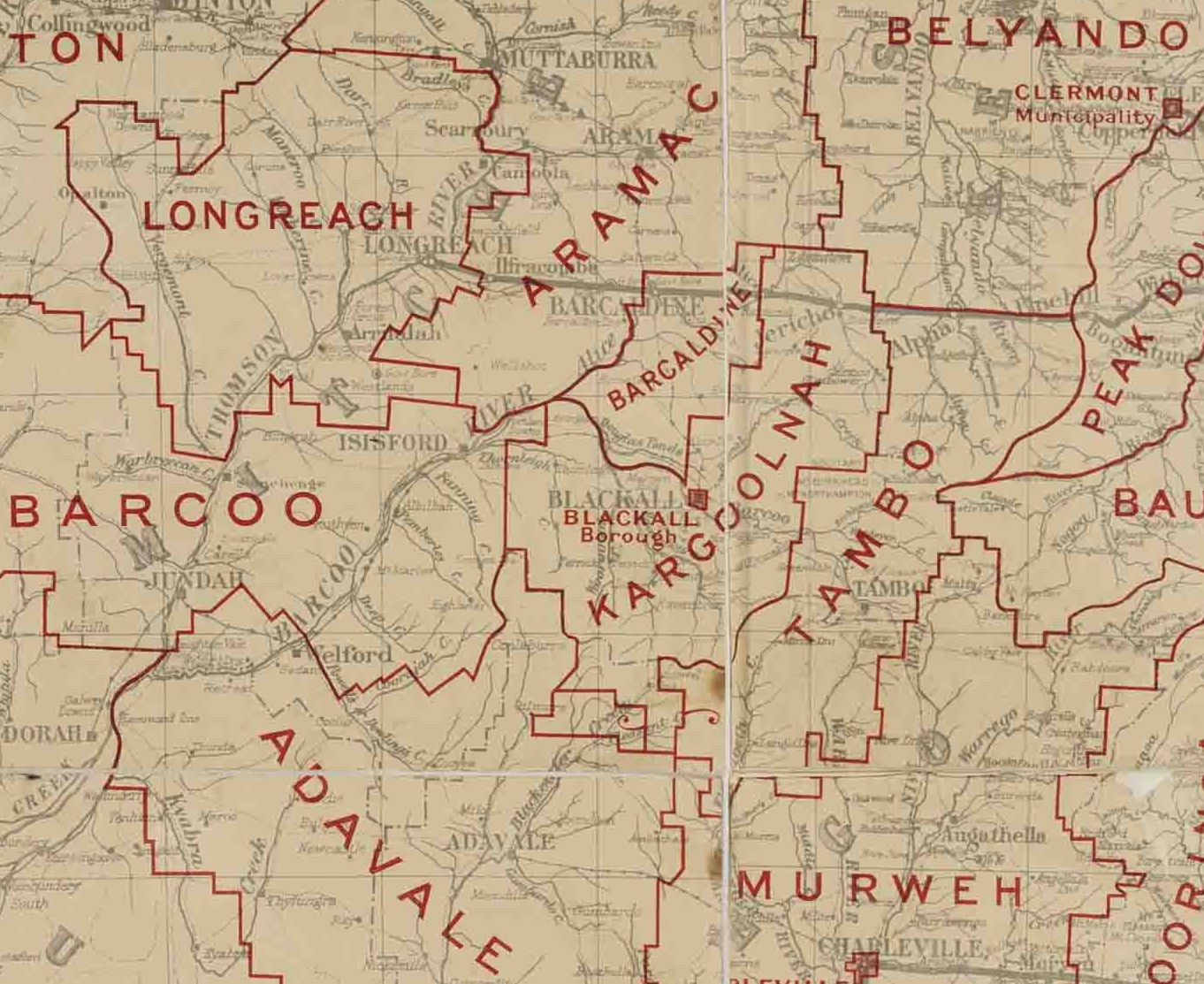
Map of Borough of Blackall and adjacent local government areas, March 1902

On 20 May 1880, the urban part of Blackall was excised from the Kargoolnah Division to create a municipal Borough of Blackall. Its first councillors were elected in July 1880.

On 31 March 1903, with the passage of the Local Authorities Act 1902, the Borough of Blackall became the Town of Blackall, while Kargoolnah Division became the Shire of Kargoolnah.

On 7 November 1931, the Town of Blackall was abolished and became Division 3 of the Shire of Kargoolnah, which had in the meantime shrunk to include only the Blackall region. On 19 November 1932, after representations to the State Government, the Shire of Kargoolnah was officially renamed Shire of Blackall.

== Mayors ==
- 1927: C. W. Kingston
