= Alfred Mowbray Hutton =

Alfred Mowbray Hutton was an architect in Australia. Some of his works are heritage-listed.

== Early life ==
Alfred Mowbray Hutton was born in Victoria.

== Architectural practice ==
Hutton practiced in Victoria before moving to Rockhampton, Queensland, in mid-1894 to take over the practice of James Flint, to whom he was related by marriage. He designed a hotel for JM Headrick & Co at Lake's Creek the following year. Hutton practiced widely in Rockhampton, both as a sole practitioner and in partnership with Edwin Morton Hockings, which lasted from 1898 until 1904.

== Later life ==
Hutton died on 26 July 1911 in Rockhampton, QLD.

The many friends of Mr. Mowbray Hutton will regret to hear of his death, which occurred early this morning at the residence of Mrs. Flint, Oxford street, The Range. Mr. Hutton has been in failing health for some time past. He has rallied at time, and hopes have been entertained that he might recover but during the past few days it has been apparent that he was hearing the end. Mr. Hutton came to Rockhampton some years ago to practise his profession as an architect. Shortly after coming here he entered into partnership with Mr. E. M. Hockings, a partnership that lasted till about eight years ago, when Mr. Hutton went south. He recently returned to Rockhampton, and his well-known skill as an architect soon brought him plenty of business. Had his health not failed, it is certain that he would have built up a very remunerative connection. Amongst the more important of the buildings erected to his plan and under his supervision is the big warehouse of Messrs. Walter Reid and Company at the corner of East and Derby streets, the design for which was a matter of public competition; Mr. Hutton was in his 43rd year. So that his death is all the more sad from the fact that he passed away at what is usually the prime of a mans life. He was a cousin of Mr. W. Hutton, the Secretary of the Charters Towers Stock Exchange.

== Significant works ==
- 1897–98: Mount Morgan Gold Mining Company Building (now the ABC Capricornia studios) in Rockhampton
- Barcaldine Shire Hall in Barcaldine
- Christ Church Anglican Church in St Lawrence
- John M Headrick & Co Building in Rockhampton
- Walter Reid Community Arts Centre in Rockhampton
