= Shire of Barcaldine =

- Local government area
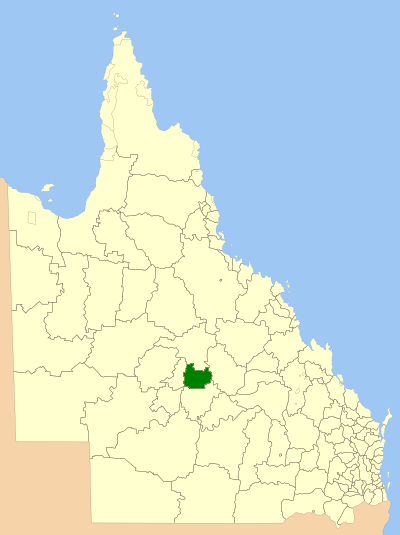
- Location within Queensland

- Country: Australia
- State: Queensland
- Established: 1892
- Council seat: Barcaldine

Area
  - Total: 8,448.4 km^{2} (3,261.9 sq mi)

Population
  - Total: 1,818 (2006 census)
  - Density: 0.21519/km^{2} (0.55734/sq mi)
- Website: Shire of Barcaldine
LGAs around Shire of Barcaldine
Ilfracombe	Aramac	Jericho
Ilfracombe	Shire of Barcaldine	Jericho
Blackall	Blackall	Blackall

The Shire of Barcaldine was a local government area located in central Queensland and headquartered in the town of Barcaldine. It covered an area of 8,448.4 square kilometres (3,261.9 sq mi), and existed as a local government entity from 1892 until 2008, when it amalgamated with the Shires of Aramac and Jericho to form the Barcaldine Region.

Major industries in the area are wool and grazing.

== History ==
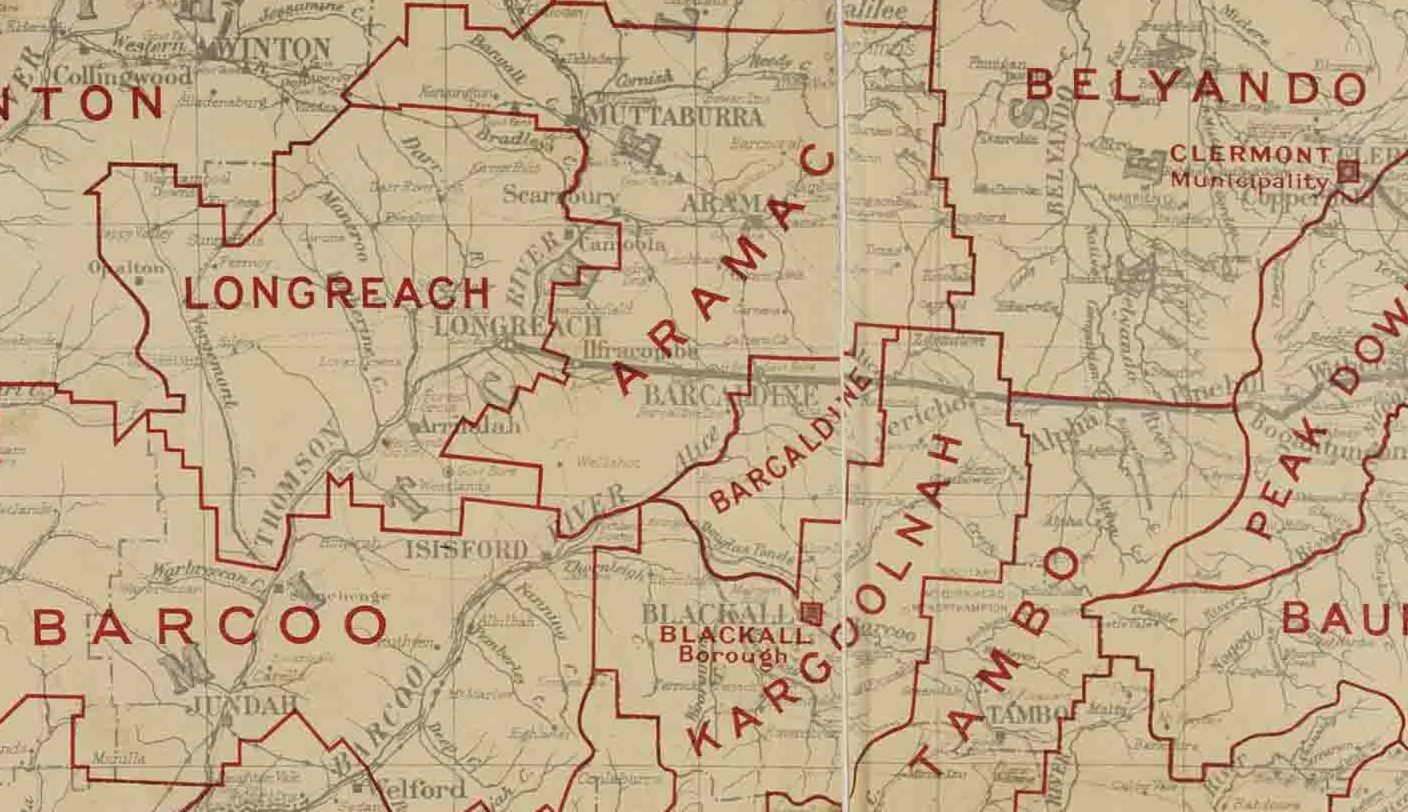
Map of Barcaldine Division and adjacent local government areas, March 1902

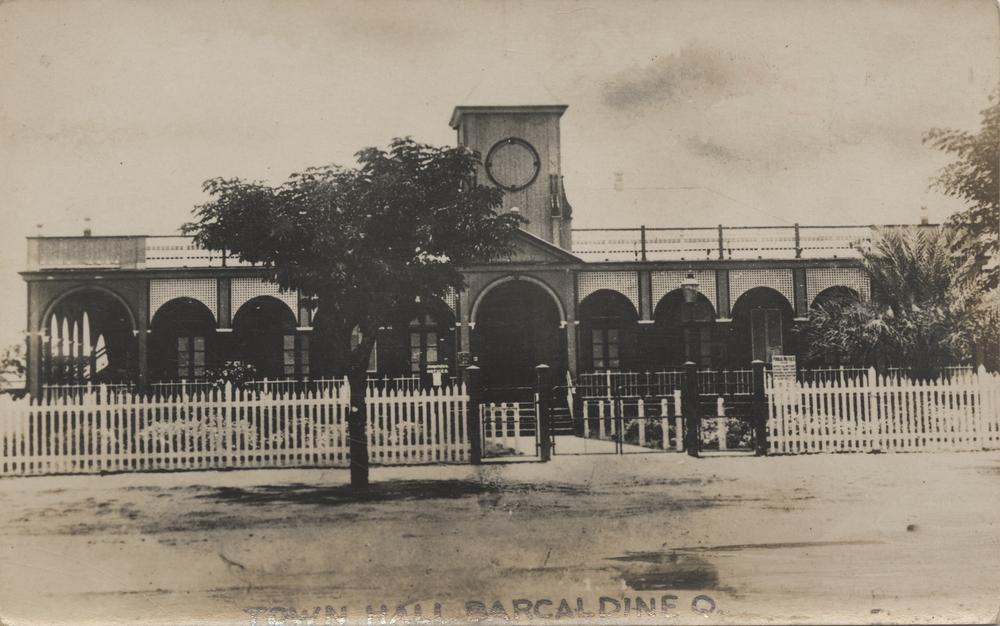
Shire Hall at Barcaldine, circa 1920

Kargoolnah Division was created on 11 November 1879 as one of 74 divisions around Queensland under the Divisional Boards Act 1879, and included the areas of Blackall, Tambo and Barcaldine as well as parts of Jericho. On 3 September 1892, a new Barcaldine Division was proclaimed and excised from Kargoolnah.

With the passage of the Local Authorities Act 1902, Barcaldine Division became Shire of Barcaldine on 31 March 1903. On 15 March 2008, under the Local Government (Reform Implementation) Act 2007 passed by the Parliament of Queensland on 10 August 2007, the Shire of Barcaldine merged with the Shires of Aramac and Jericho to form the Barcaldine Region.

The Barcaldine Shire Hall built it in 1912 is now listed on the Queensland Heritage Register.

== Towns and localities ==
The Shire of Barcaldine included the following settlements:

- Barcaldine
- Barcaldine Downs
- Grant
- Narbethong
- Patrick

== Chairmen ==
- 1893: James Cronin
- 1894: Henry Sealy
- 1895–1898: Hans C. Puet
- 1899:William Campbell
- 1900: James Meacham
- 1901: T.J. Hannay
- 1903: Henry Sealy
- 1904: Hans C. Puet
- 1905 William Campbell
- 1906: James Meacham
- 1906: Allan Martin Ferguson
- 1908: James Cronin
- 1909: Allan Martin Ferguson
- 1910: Hans C. Puet
- 1911: Allan Martin Ferguson
- 1912: James Cronin
- 1918: T.J. Hannay
- 1919–1920: W.J.Forthergill
- 1920–1924: R.A.Parnell
- 1924–1930: R.F.Lyons
- 1930–1953: C.F. Lloyd-Jones
- 1953–1985 J.D.Bennett OBE
- 1985–1992 L.T.Norman

== Population ==
Year	Population
1933	2,612
1947	2,147
1954	2,200
1961	2,384
1966	2,282
1971	1,868
1976	1,780
1981	1,783
1986	1,779
1991	1,813
1996	1,850
2001	1,773
2006	1,818
