= Shire of Bauhinia =

Coordinates: 24°06′58.73″S 148°05′18.07″E

- Local government area
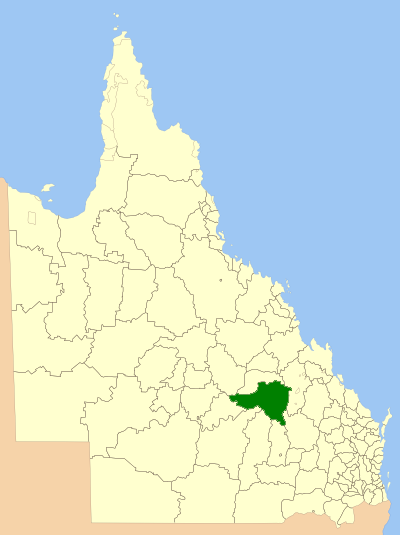
- Location within Queensland

- Country: Australia
- State: Queensland
- Region: Central Highlands
- Established: 1879
- Council seat: Springsure

Government
  - Mayor: Tim Stevenson

Area
  - Total: 23,649.6 km^{2} (9,131.2 sq mi)

Population
  - Total: 2,189 (2006 census)
  - Density: 0.092560/km^{2} (0.23973/sq mi)
LGAs around Shire of Bauhinia
Jericho	Emerald	Duaringa
Tambo	Shire of Bauhinia	Taroom
Murweh	Booringa	Bungil

The Shire of Bauhinia was a local government area in Central Queensland, Queensland, Australia. The Shire, administered from the town of Springsure, covered an area of 23,649.6 square kilometres (9,131.2 sq mi), and existed as a local government entity from 1879 until 2008, when it was amalgamated with the Shires of Duaringa, Emerald and Peak Downs to form the Central Highlands Region.

The area is a staging point for expeditions to Carnarvon National Park.

== History ==
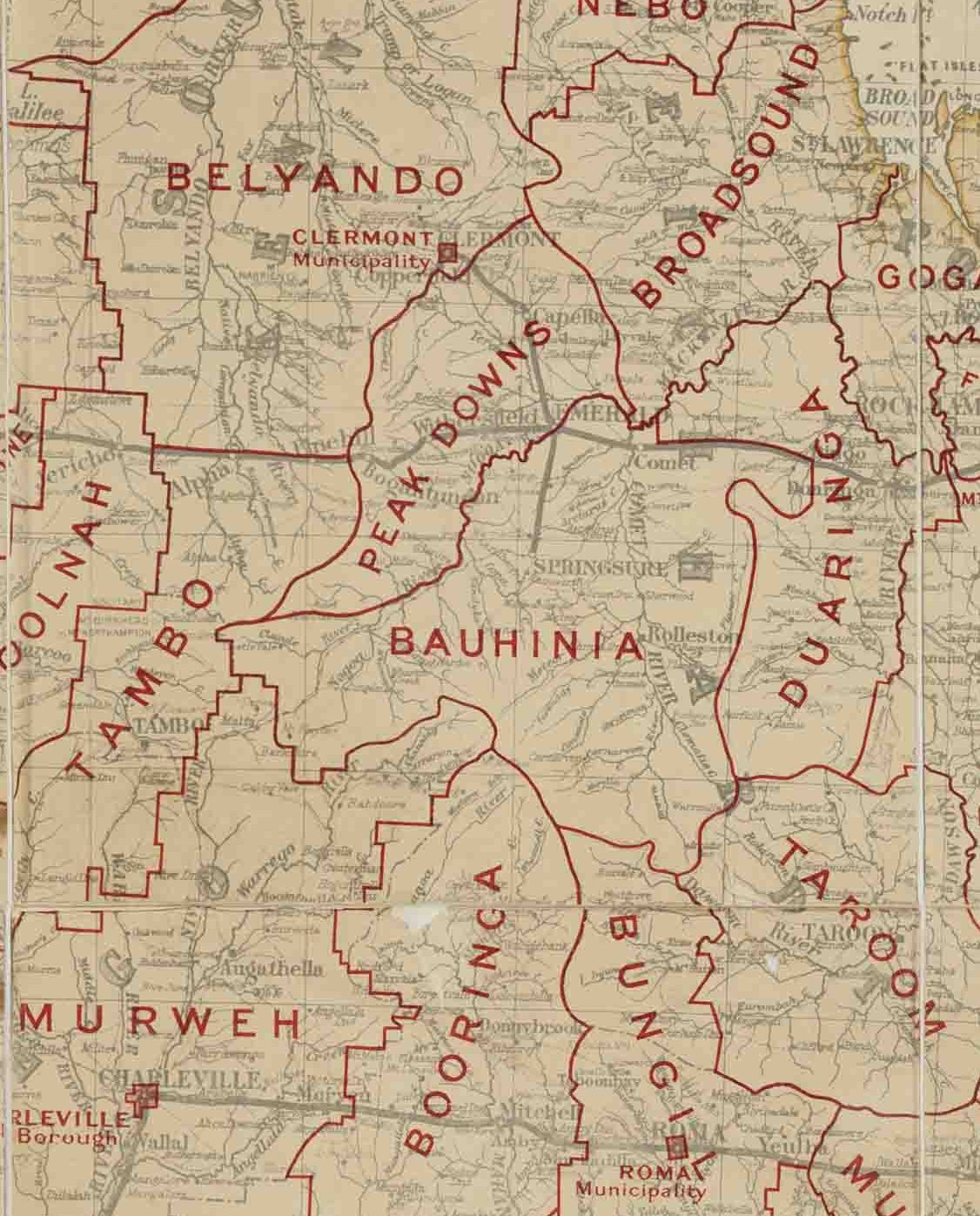
Map of Bauhinia Division and adjacent local government areas, March 1902

On 11 November 1879, the Bauhinia Division was established as one of 74 divisions around Queensland under the Divisional Boards Act 1879 with a population of 1426.

On 4 January 1884, there was an adjustment of boundaries between Bauhinia Division's subdivisions Nos. 2 and 3 and the Duaringa Division. Soon after, on 20 March 1884, there was a further adjustment of boundaries between Bauhinia Division's subdivisions Nos. 1 and 3 and Duaringa Division.

With the passage of the Local Authorities Act 1902, Bauhinia Division became Shire of Bauhinia on 31 March 1903.

On 15 March 2008, under the Local Government (Reform Implementation) Act 2007 passed by the Parliament of Queensland on 10 August 2007, Bauhinia merged with the Shires of Duaringa, Peak Downs and Emerald (formerly part of Peak Downs) to form the Central Highlands Region.

This was despite Bauhinia Shire residents being strongly opposed to being incorporated into the new Emerald-based council area. From a total of 1,000 people, 966 voted no to the proposal in a poll conducted by Bauhinia Shire Council in August 2007.

== Towns and localities ==
The Shire of Bauhinia included the following settlements:

- Arcadia Valley
- Arcturus
- Buckland
- Cairdbeign
- Cona Creek
- Consuelo
- Coorumbene
- Humboldt
- Lowesby
- Minerva
- Nandowrie
- Orion
- Rewan
- Rolleston
- Springsure
- Togara
- Wealwandangie

== National parks ==
- Carnarvon National Park
- Nuga Nuga National Park

== Chairmen/mayors ==
- 1903–1904: Alexander John Bean
- 1904–1905: Adam Colquohn Gillespie
- 1905–1906: Thomas Slatyer
- 1906–1907: Alexander McLaughlin
- 1907–1908: Frederick William Donkin
- 1908–1909: Alexander McLaughlin
- 1909–1911: John Cunningham Wells
- 1911–1913: James Alexander Milliken
- 1913–1915 : Adam James Nutter Gillespie
- 1917–1920: Michael Martin Kavanagh
- 1920–1921: John Francis Le Feuvre
- 1921–1924: John Cunningham Wells
- 1924–1939: Michael Martin Kavanagh
- 1939: Marcus Lindsay McLaughlin
- 1939–1949: Horatio Spencer Howe Wills
- 1949–1952: William Henry Hoch
- 1952–?: Marcus Lindsay McLaughlin
- c1978: Albert Clive Rolfe MBE
- 1985–1997: Gail Elizabeth Nixon OAM
- 2004–2008: Tim Stevenson

== Population ==
Year	Population
1933	1,706
1947	1,456
1954	1,633
1961	1,827
1966	2,094
1971	2,319
1976	2,372
1981	3,086
1986	2,654
1991	2,565
1996	2,543
2001	2,575
2006	2,179
