= Christ Church Anglican Church, St Lawrence =

Christ Church Anglican Church
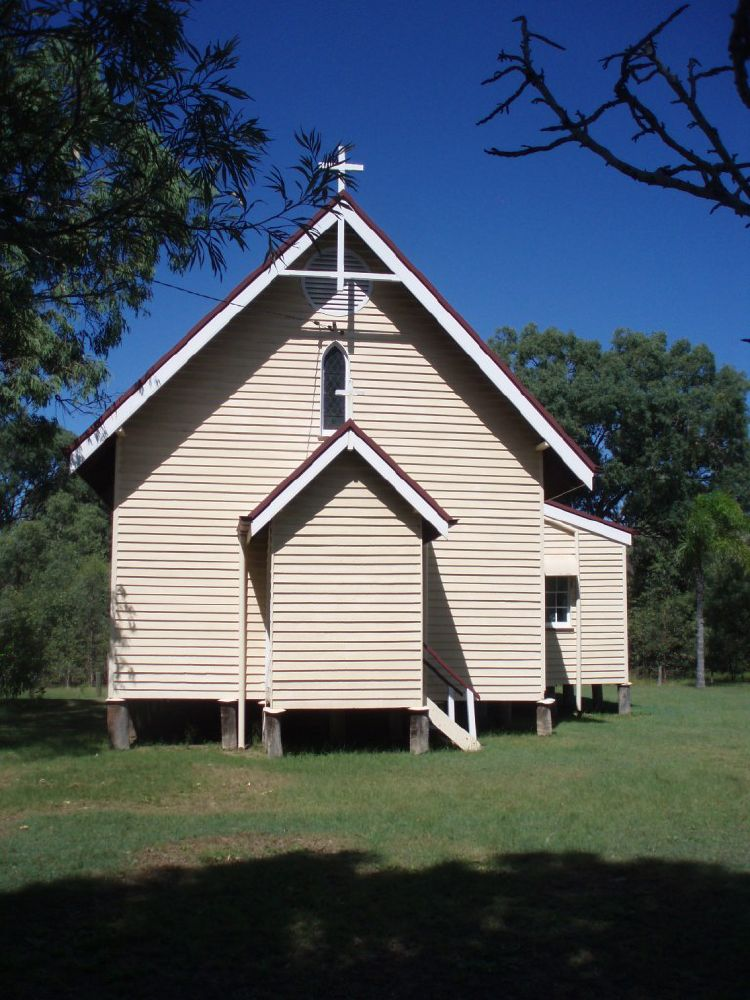
- Christ Church Anglican Church, 2009

- Location within Queensland Location within Australia
- 22.3464°S 149.5385°E
- Location: Cannon Street, St Lawrence, Isaac Region, Queensland, Australia

History
- Design period: 1870s–1890s (late 19th century)
- Built: 1898

Site notes
- Architect: Alfred Mowbray Hutton
- Architectural style: Gothic

Queensland Heritage Register
- Official name: Christ Church Anglican Church
- Type: state heritage (landscape, built)
- Designated: 27 October 2000
- Reference no.: 601661
- Significant period: 1890s (historical) ongoing (social)
- Significant components: school/school room, furniture/fittings, church, garden/grounds, residential accommodation – chaplain's house/quarters, trees/plantings, views to
- Builders: Newman Brothers

Christ Church Anglican Church is a heritage-listed church at Cannon Street, St Lawrence, Isaac Region, Queensland, Australia. It was designed by Alfred Mowbray Hutton and built in 1898 by Newman Brothers. It was added to the Queensland Heritage Register on 27 October 2000.

== History ==
The Christ Church Anglican Church, St Lawrence was constructed in 1898 to a design by Alfred Mowbray Hutton and constructed by Newman Brothers of Rockhampton.

European settlement began in the St Lawrence area by 1860, when John Arthur Macartney formed Waverley Station. The St Lawrence area had a strong connection with the pastoral industry in the 19th century. McCartney took up land at the head of Broadsound and Waverley in 1860 and used the banks of the St Lawrence Creek to land his supplies. Later that year a boiling down works for tallow was established. In 1861 the Rockhampton Port Master recommended the site for a port, and government buildings were soon constructed. These included a Telegraph Office, Police Station and Court House.

Prior to the establishment of an Anglican church at St Lawrence, quarterly Catholic and Anglican services, were held at the Courthouse. The development of the meatworks in 1893 meant a steady growth in population and by the end of the 1890s, a permanent church building became a necessity.

In March 1898, Vicar AH Julius visited St Lawrence to make arrangements for the immediate construction of a building. Five acres of land "in a good position" was purchased and it was reported that "the Church will be a conspicuous object in the main street of the town".

Rockhampton architect, Alfred Mowbray Hutton, designed a simple building with seating for around 100 people, a side section with a large classroom and a small bedroom and verandah for visiting clergymen. Tenders were called for submission of quotes by 18 April 1898. Newman Brothers of Rockhampton were awarded the contract. Alfred Mowbray Hutton (c. 1868-1911) was in partnership with George C Lavater as Lavater and Hutton, architects in Mildura before coming to Queensland. He took over the Rockhampton practice of James Flint in mid-1894. Hutton became an associate of the Queensland Institute of Architects in 1897. From 1898 to 1904 he was in partnership in Rockhampton with Edwin Morton Hockings and in 1911 with FE Boddington. On Saturday 21 May 1898, the foundation block of the church was laid by the Premier of Queensland, Thomas Byrnes, MLA for Warwick.

With a classroom for a Sunday School and a bedroom for visiting clergy, the church played an important role in the local community. At one time, the vestry served as the residence for a local school teacher. Apart from a period of about two months, there has never been a resident priest at the church. Currently located in the Parish of North Rockhampton, the Christ Church Anglican church, has also been part of the Parishes of Rockhampton and Park Avenue.

Repairs to the church became a necessity, and in 1985 local people organised a restoration committee to raise sufficient funds to replace the roof, paint the vestry and to have the stained glass windows restored. A 1988 bi-centennial grant paid for the lining of the church's north and south walls as well as the reflooring, relining and painting of the vestry. Occasional services are still held in the church each year.

== Description ==
The Christ Church, Anglican Church, is a single storey, timber building clad with weatherboards with a gable roof clad with corrugated iron, prominently located at the eastern end of Macartney Street. A small front porch with a separated gable roof is located at the western end of the building. The gables of the main roof and the porch are surmounted by timber crucifixes. The rooms on the southern side of the church have a skillion roof clad with corrugated iron.

A set of timber stairs is located in the porch leading to the front door. The paired, cedar doors have a pointed arch design and open to the main part of the church. A group of three pointed arch, stained glass windows are located high in the eastern elevation. A similar, single window is located above the main door. A circular ventilator is located high in the western facade. Five pointed arch, cedar windows are located along the northern elevation. Three pointed arch, cedar windows are located along the southern elevation. The side rooms, associated with the skillion roofed extension, have multi-paned sash, casement windows surmounted by metal sunhoods.

Internally, timber pews are located on either side of a central aisle leading to the raised sanctuary at the eastern end of the church. The eastern wall of the sanctuary and adjoining southern wall are lined with painted horizontal tongue and groove timber. The remainder of the church is clad internally with chamferboards. This sanctuary is raised about a metre higher than the church floor and includes a cedar altar and communion rails. The timber ceiling is braced with arched metal rods.

At the rear of the church is a sandstone font with decorative mouldings and designs. The timber dedication plaque on the porch incorporates a brass centenary plaque attached to the original timber plaque. The timber plaque reads: "Laid by Hon T.J. Byrnes; May 21, 1898; A.H. Julius Vicar; W Armstrong Warden".

The skillion roofed extension is accessed via paired cedar doors in the southern wall. The area is timber floored and clad with chamferboards. A partition divides the room at the western end and a timber trunk and metal bed with mosquito net are located in the room. A timber organ, built by WH Paling & Co, is located in room on the southern side of the church.

The church is surrounded by mature trees and garden beds.

== Heritage listing ==
Christ Church Anglican Church was listed on the Queensland Heritage Register on 27 October 2000 having satisfied the following criteria.

The place is important in demonstrating the evolution or pattern of Queensland's history.

Constructed in 1898 and forming part of the old town of St Lawrence, the Christ Church Anglican Church is significant in demonstrating the development of the Anglican Church in Queensland and St Lawrence during this time.

The place is important in demonstrating the principal characteristics of a particular class of cultural places.

With its steeply pitched gable roof and pointed arch motif windows and doors, the Christ Church Anglican Church is a good example of a picturesque and well executed Gothic influenced timber ecclesiastical building.

The place is important because of its aesthetic significance.

The church is important for its aesthetic significance, particularly its substantial landmark qualities in the St Lawrence townscape and from Macartney Street.

The place has a strong or special association with a particular community or cultural group for social, cultural or spiritual reasons.

As a place of public worship for over 100 years, the Christ Church Anglican Church is significant for its social value for the Anglican community of St Lawrence and surrounding area.

The place has a special association with the life or work of a particular person, group or organisation of importance in Queensland's history.

The church is significant for its association with Alfred Mowbray Hutton, a prominent architect in the Rockhampton and surrounding area, who designed the church.
