= AMP Building, Rockhampton =

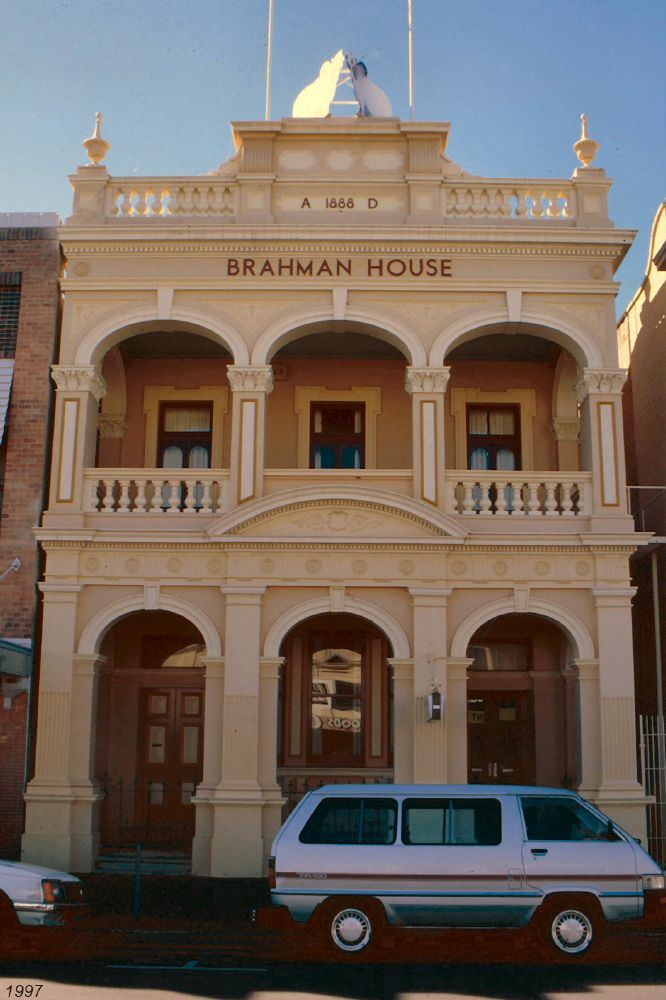
- AMP Building, 1997

- Location within Queensland Location within Australia
- 23.3808°S 150.5157°E
- Location: 183 East Street, Rockhampton, Rockhampton Region, Queensland, Australia

History
- Design period: 1870s–1890s (late 19th century)
- Built: 1888

Site notes
- Architect: Francis Drummond Greville Stanley
- Architectural style: Classicism

Queensland Heritage Register
- Official name: AMP Building (former), Brahman House
- Type: state heritage (built)
- Designated: 21 October 1992
- Reference no.: 600794
- Significant period: 1880s (fabric); 1888–1970 (historical use)
- Significant components: furniture/fittings, loggia/s, fireplace, strong room

AMP Building is a heritage-listed office building at 183 East Street, Rockhampton, Rockhampton Region, Queensland, Australia. It was designed by Francis Drummond Greville Stanley and built in 1888. It is also known as Brahman House. It was added to the Queensland Heritage Register on 21 October 1992.

== History ==
The AMP Building, currently known as Brahman House, is constructed in masonry faced most ornately with painted and modelled cement render on its loggia to East Street. Designed using classical motifs by the former Queensland Colonial Architect, FDG Stanley, this two-storey structure was built for the Australian Mutual Provident Society (AMP) in 1888.

Rockhampton was established beside the Fitzroy River on land that was originally part of Gracemere Station, a pastoral property taken up by the Archer brothers in the 1850s. Following a gold discovery at Canoona station and a survey by Arthur F Wood, the town of Rockhampton was proclaimed on 25 October 1858. Wood had worked with the surveyor Robert Hoddle in laying out Melbourne, and the author of the town plan, Francis Clarke, was Victoria's surveyor general at the time. The involvement of these people may explain a certain similarity between each city's plans, as well as, in terms of Queensland, the uncommon generosity of scale with which Rockhampton was laid out. A municipal council was formed on 15 December 1860.

The land on which this building sits was part of a larger allotment originally purchased by John Bowen Peter Hamilton Ramsay (also known as "Alphabet" Ramsey) and William Henry Gaden in May 1859 for £30. It was located in the heart of Rockhampton's burgeoning commercial district. The original allotment was subdivided in 1884 and one of the two parcels purchased in 1886 by the Australian Mutual Provident Society, whose presence in Rockhampton had been established in the same year by District Agent AM Sweet, and Agency Clerk A Haughton.

The Australian Mutual Provident Society had been launched in Sydney on New Year's Day in 1849 as a life insurance company whose policies promised to ameliorate the potentially disastrous effects of the many hazards of daily life that existed for settlers in the Australian colonies. Its founders, Rev. William Horatio Walsh, an Anglican clergyman, and two Sydney businessmen, Thomas Holt Jnr and Thomas Sutcliffe Mort, had met the previous year to discuss how such a society might proceed. Since its establishment, the AMP has remained one of the largest life insurance offices in Australia, and in 1999 when historian Geoffrey Blainey wrote a history of the company, it was the country's largest owner of both shares and city offices.

Following its first decade, the Society's membership began to increase steadily and in 1875 it established a separate Queensland board that was headquartered in Brisbane. This was in response to demands from Queensland members who saw their infant colony as having great potential and their concerns as requiring attention from local directors. At that time, policyholders living with 25 degrees of the Equator were required to pay a surcharge as it was commonly believed that Europeans living in "the tropics" and doing hard work outdoors risked their health. It was only after 1873 that AMP policyholders were allowed to visit Rockhampton and places further north without seeking special permission regarding the effect of such travel on the validity of their policies. It was not until 1881, after some actuarial analysis of existing policies and owing to intense rivalry from other insurance firms, that these surcharges were lifted on all "tropical" Australian policies.

The Society's practice of dividing colonies into selling districts was applied to Queensland in 1883. In each district an office would be set up in a specially designed building located in a central town, and the building's parapet would carry the Society's trademark statuary, "the Amicus". This had been sculpted by Charles Summers for the parapet of the Pitt Street building, which was opened in Sydney in 1880 as the Society's head office. The statuary was composed as follows: the centrepiece, Tyche, the Greek goddess of fortune and luck, stood beside a cornucopia and held in her left hand a palm branch signifying victory; reclining below her were a youth on one side and a woman and child on the other. This statuary normally carried the Latin caption "Amicus certa in re incerta" meaning "A certain friend in uncertain times".

The AMP building in Rockhampton was built in 1888 from a design by the prominent architect F D G Stanley. Francis Drummond Greville Stanley was born in Edinburgh, Scotland, and began his architectural training there in 1855. He emigrated to Queensland in 1861, set up private practice in 1862, and was appointed as clerk of works in the Office of the Colonial Architect, Charles Tiffin, in 1863. He stayed in this position for nine years and was appointed as Colonial Architect in 1872 after Tiffin retired. Stanley held this position until 1881. It was during this time that he designed one of his most well known works, the Supreme Court building in Brisbane. Stanley continued to run a private practice throughout his term as Colonial Architect and this brought complaints from other architects. He left his government position when he was offered the commission to design the Queensland National Bank, also in Brisbane. He established his first branch office in Maryborough in 1882. In 1886, he was the first Queensland architect to be elected fellow of the Royal Institute of British Architects, and two years later he became foundation President of the Queensland Institute of Architects. Stanley continued practicing until his death in 1897.

Stanley's design for the Rockhampton office reflects the classical mode in which the Pitt Street headquarters had been realised. William Cherry supervised the Rockhampton work for Stanley. An 1897 article in The Mutual Provident Messenger, the Society's in-house magazine, describes the interior of the Rockhampton building; its floors being laid with decorated tiles, the general office fitted with elaborate cedar fixtures, and the massive plaster ceilings decorated with panelled and enriched cornices.

The AMP regional office continued in this East Street building until 1970 when the Society moved to new Rockhampton premises on the same street. The property was sold in 1972 to the Australian Brahman Breeders Association. This organisation had begun as the Australian Zebu Breeders' Society in 1946 in an effort to promote a breed of cattle more able to withstand the effects of north Australia's cattle ticks and droughts than traditional British breeds. They continue to occupy the building on East Street.

== Description ==
The Australian Mutual Provident Society (AMP) Building is located on a block of East Street, which is bounded to the south-east and north- west respectively by Derby and William Streets, and populated with a number of other buildings of heritage significance. Those listed on the Queensland Heritage Register include: Walter Reid Community Arts Centre and John Headrick's Building. As Brahman House, the building is included on the Australian Heritage Commission's Register of the National Estate. Further to the north-west on East Street are located the Rockhampton Post Office and Court House Precinct, both of which are listed on the Queensland Heritage Register.

The two-storey building is located within the central business district of Rockhampton; the Fitzroy River is a block away to the north-east, and the central railway station five blocks to the south-east. Running along the short, north-eastern edge of the allotments is Quay Lane, which forms part of a system of such laneways that inhabits the city centre's orthogonal grid and services its primary streets. The grid is aligned to the course of the river that flows from the north-west to the south-east. Together the two allotments total almost 430 square metres (4,600 sq ft) in area.

Two corridors of space separate the AMP building from the properties on either side. The corridor facing the north-western allotment boundary is approximately 150 millimetres (5.9 in) wide, while that to the opposite boundary shared with the John Headrick's Building is over 1 metre (3 ft 3 in) wide enough to allow room for an external fire escape stair. The original AMP building occupies approximately half of the allotment addressing East Street, while a further quarter of the remaining site area has been filled by a recent single-storey addition. The rear section of site facing Quay Lane is used for car parking.

The 1888 building is constructed of brick faced with cement render, which is painted and modelled to varying degrees on each facade. An arcaded loggia almost 2.5 metres (8 ft 2 in) deep has been formed on the front facade using three evenly disposed archways. Horizontally this facade is divided into three bands:the ground and first storeys, and a decorated parapet with classical modellings. The archways to the ground storey are framed by four Roman Doric-style pilasters topped with an entablature spanning the full width of the building. Above the middle archway, and supported on two central pilasters is a gently curved pediment. Its gable is decorated with a moulding of a shield and garlands to each side. The frieze of the entablature is embellished with triglyphs and rosettes, while the lower halves of the pilasters are fluted and sit on pedestals about 1 metre (3 ft 3 in) high. The lines of the base, plinth and pedestal mouldings are carried through to the wall from which the pilasters stand proud. The basket arches to the ground-storey loggia each have a simply modelled extrados and keystone, and are spring from imposts.

The upper storey component of the front facade is formed with four rectangular columns, which sit directly above the pilasters. There are basket arches formed by these columns, which are modelling in a similar fashion to those described earlier. The columns have Corinthian capitals and simple mouldings on their East Street shafts. Between each column, the balustrading is topped with a rail of modelled render. While the curved pediment from below fills the space between the central two columns and underneath its top rail, on each side sections of curved balusters are fitted. A further entablature, again running the width of the building, caps this arcade and separates it from the parapet above. The current name of the building "Brahman House" is placed in the frieze, each end of which is finished with a rosette. The scale of this cornice is somewhat exaggerated. The parapet is framed with two pedestal-like projections at each end of the facade, upon which sit decorative urns. In the centre, above the curved pediment, the parapet projection has a second layer topped with a further cornice. The line of moulding with which the end pedestals are capped runs the length of the parapet, forming a top rail for the sections of curved balusters fitted to each side of the central projection. In the centre, below this moulding line the date "A 1888 D" has been placed. A recent sign in the shape of two Brahman bulls, facing each direction of East Street, sits on this raised piece of parapet above the date.

There are two steps separating the East Street footpath and the loggia on the ground storey. The floor to this area is lined with a chequered pattern of black and white ceramic tiles that is bordered with coloured tiles (blue and tan). Ornate, cast iron gates close off the lower half of each archway. The interior facade of this loggia is faced with painted, cement render. A stringcourse matching the impost line from the exterior is carried through here. Two double doors and a large central window correspond with the position of the archways on the outer building face. The entry door is on the right hand side when approaching from the street. At each door, there is a step up into the building from the loggia level. The outer double doors are painted timber and each leaf is divided into three parts. A small tiled alcove separates the entry doors from a second set, which have etched glass inserts in each low-waisted leaf. These also have ornate brass handles and appear to be made of polished cedar. The inner facade's window is divided into three double-hung sashes- two outer narrow ones and a wide central one. The large sill is supported on four consoles. The heads of each door is formed by the impost or entablature moulding, which separates them from a transom light. The window heads are in line with the heads of the transom lights. The sides of this ground floor loggia are made with archways that match those facing East Street. They are filled with a low balustrading like that on the parapet and tall cast iron fencing. The ceiling to this space appears to be rendered and gently curved between the street and inside facade.

On the upper storey of the arcade is a verandah. The inside face of this space has three evenly disposed cedar doors around which are bands of render moulding. The doors are French, with curved heads in each leaf and rectangular pivoted fanlights above. The flat verandah ceiling has simple cornices and is lined with a sheet material made of tiny corrugations similar to "ripple iron". The sides to each boundary have archways matching those facing East Street.

The side and rear facades appear to be faced with render, which is scored to resemble ashlar and painted. While there are no windows in the north-western side facade, a number open out of the south-eastern one looking onto the fire escape corridor. The side walls extend above the level of the corrugated iron roof, which appears to be hipped. Its ridge runs on an axis between East Street and Quay Lane, and is punctured by at least one decorative iron vent. A modelled chimneystack also emerges from the north-west face of the hip. The single-storey addition to the rear is constructed of painted concrete masonry walls and a hipped, corrugated Colorbond roof. On each level, there are three openings on the rear facade of the original building. The upper storey windows are still visible from Quay Lane. Two are square-headed double-hung sashes and another, positioned lower than these two, opens into the rear stairway. This is a double-hung sash with a semicircular head.

=== Interiors ===
The ground storey is divided into a reception area, a small open-plan work area and two offices at the rear. To the front of the building, against the north-western side of the building, is a long storage space partly occupied by a single flight of polished timber stairs. A door surrounded by a deep cedar frame, connects this space with the reception area. To the rear of this is a stair that doubles back on itself in reaching the upper level. The strong room is still evident between the storage corridor, the front reception area and a rear corridor. A lining of double brick is visible on the interior of the door opening into the strong room. The floors in this room are unlined concrete, while those elsewhere on the same level are variously lined with carpet or vinyl.

The ornately carved cedar reception desk remains in place. It connects into similarly carved cedar panelling that encloses the entry alcove described earlier. This sits below the level of the rectangular fanlight to the outer door, and is topped with a carved entablature supported by fluted pilasters. The reception desk is embellished with a number of panels of ceramic inlay.

The two offices at the rear of the building are separated from the front work area with a floor-to-ceiling height screen made up of a lower half of timber panelling and semi-transparent glass held in timber frames above. The timber is stained and polished to match the colouring of the other original cedar fittings. The ground floor ceiling height is approximately 3 metres (9.8 ft) throughout. The wall-to-ceiling join and two cross-beams are decorated with an ornate cornice, the most prominent feature of which are rows of dentils. The rear timber and glass screen collides with an ornately decorated cornice line and two plaster ceiling roses, suggesting that it was added sometime after the original building fit-out.

The rear staircase balustrading is made of ornately carved, polished cedar. Its underside is lined with ripple iron. The upper level is divided into a number of offices and a large meeting room that opens onto the East Street verandah. The ceiling in one of the upper level rooms is lined entirely with ripple iron, and decorated with less ornate cornices than those installed on the lower level. There is an ornate vent panel in the centre of this ceiling. In one of the walls of this room there is a large metal door, possibly leading into a safe.

The meeting room has matching cornices and its mantelpiece is made of marble, with simply applied decoration framing each side. The fireplace consists of a cast-iron grate and a tiled hearth. Separating the mantel sides and the grate are columns of ceramic tiles with an elegant botanical motif. The door into the meeting room is made of painted timber, and has four panels and a pivoting rectangular fanlight. Throughout this storey, the floor-to-ceiling height is approximately 3 metres (9.8 ft).

== Heritage listing ==
The former AMP Building was listed on the Queensland Heritage Register on 21 October 1992 having satisfied the following criteria.

The place is important in demonstrating the evolution or pattern of Queensland's history.

The Australian Mutual Provident Society's establishment of a district head office in Rockhampton in 1888 reflects central Queensland's growing prosperity during this boom decade of the 19th century and the outcomes anticipated from consolidation of settlement in the region. It also demonstrates the increasing desire of settlers for some means by which to protect their families against the economic hardships often brought on by the death of a "breadwinner" and the commercial competition that was occurring to meet this demand with life insurance provisions. Such concerns are indicative both of a willingness to consider the future financial well-being of dependents and the forward-thinking embraced by an increasing number of the region's settled inhabitants; against a backdrop of the government not providing welfare benefits to its citizens.

The place is important in demonstrating the principal characteristics of a particular class of cultural places.

The classical principles and motifs employed in the AMP Building- in a restrained fashion when a comparison is made with other commercial premises in the precinct- reflect the high standard of architectural design required of such a flagship building. It was one of many district offices that were constructed in main streets around Australia by what became one of the largest companies to begin operation in Australia and achieve an international reputation. Its parapet carried the Amicus statuary that was recognized throughout the country as the symbol of the Australian Mutual Provident Society.

The place is important because of its aesthetic significance.

In addition to the aesthetic skill with which the East Street facade has been executed- in terms of scale, proportion and the deft use of classical elements- the extant interior cedar fittings, also incorporating components of the classical language, demonstrate a high degree of craftsmanship and the thoroughness of the building's overall design concept. The arrangement of rooms, and the quality and fine condition in which the finishes and fittings survive combine to make the building's interiors highly significant.

The place has a special association with the life or work of a particular person, group or organization of importance in Queensland's history.

The AMP building is associated with the work of the Australian Mutual Provident Society, serving as its central Queensland headquarters for 82 years. It is also an example of the commercial work of the Queensland architect FDG Stanley
