= Shire of Peak Downs =

Coordinates: 23°04′59.7″S 148°01′25.6″E

- Local government area
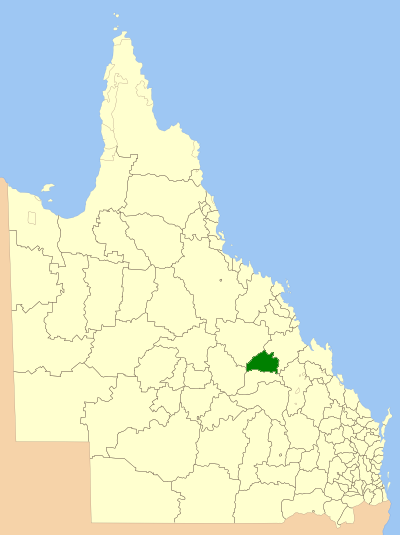
- Location within Queensland

- Country: Australia
- State: Queensland
- Region: Central Queensland
- Council seat: Capella

Population
  - Total: 3,188 (2006 census)
- Website: Shire of Peak Downs
LGAs around Shire of Peak Downs
Belyando	Broadsound	Broadsound
Belyando	Shire of Peak Downs	Broadsound
Jericho	Emerald	Emerald

The Shire of Peak Downs was a local government area in the Central Highlands of Queensland, Australia, 320 km west of both Rockhampton and Mackay. On 15 March 2008 the shires of Duaringa, Emerald, Bauhinia and Peak Downs were amalgamated to form the Central Highlands Region.

== History ==
Yambina (also known as Jambina and Jambeena) is an Australian Aboriginal language of Central Queensland. Its traditional language region is the local government area of Central Highlands Region, including Peak Downs, Logan Creek, south to Avon Downs, east to Denham Range and Logan Downs, west to Elgin Downs and at Solferino.

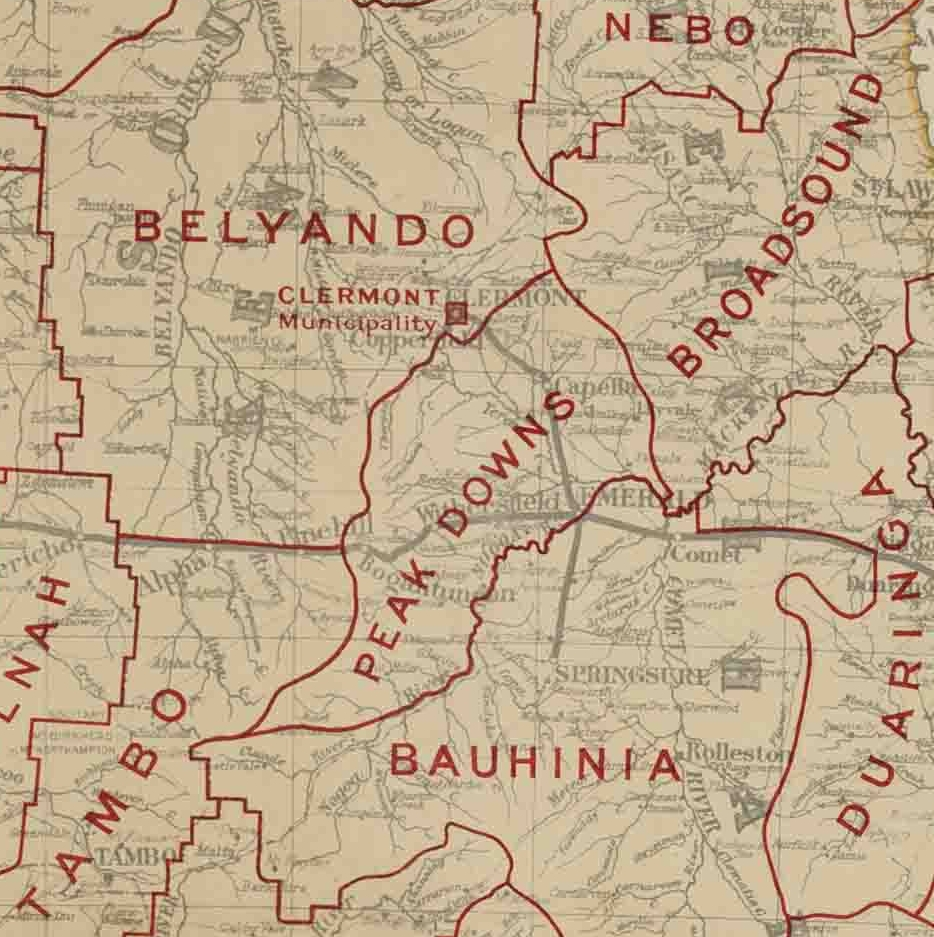
Map of Peak Downs Division and adjacent local government areas, March 1902

On 11 November 1879, the Belyando Division was established as one of 74 divisions around Queensland under the Divisional Boards Act 1879.

On 20 September 1884 Peak Downs Division was created by excising the southern part of Belyando Division.

On 7 June 1902 part of Peak Downs Division was excised to create Emerald Division.

On 31 March 1903, Peak Downs Division became the Shire of Peak Downs.

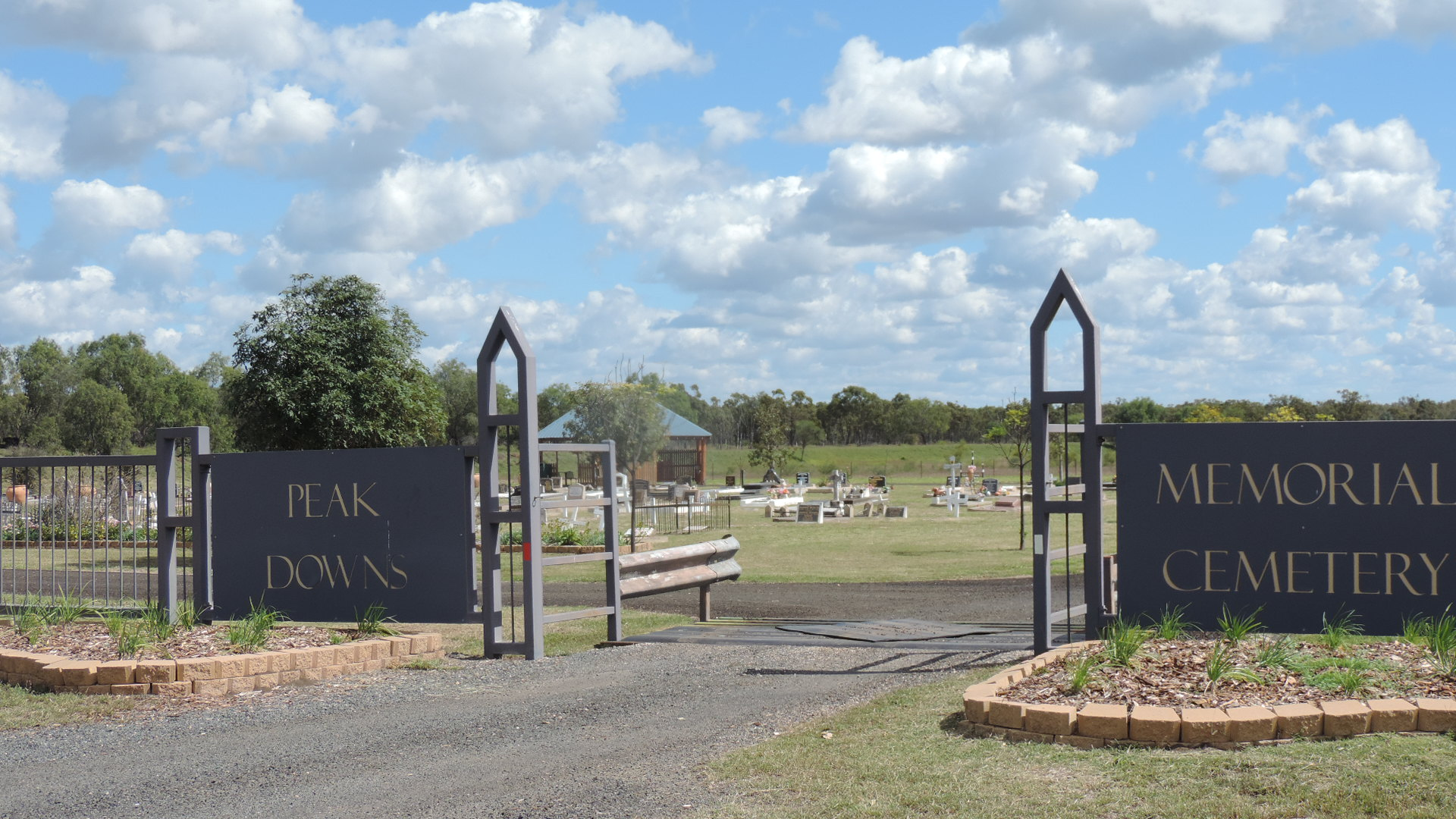
Peak Downs cemetery in Capella, 2016

In 1927, the shire's offices were located in Capella.

In 2008, the shire's offices were located at 24 Conran Street. The Peak Downs Cemetery was also located in Capella.

On 15 March 2008 Peak Downs Shire was abolished by being amalgamated with Shire of Bauhinia, Shire of Duaringa and Shire of Emerald to create Emerald Regional Council.

== Towns and localities ==
The Shire of Peak Downs included the following settlements:

Towns:

- Capella
- Tieri

== Economy ==
It had about 4,000 inhabitants, the primary economic activities in the shire are coal mining, farming and grazing.

The Shire is part of the Bowen Basin, a major coal deposit. Mining began in the shire in the late 1970s with the opening of Gregory coal mine in 1979, which was followed by Mount Isa Mines' Oaky Creek coal mine in 1983. Oaky Creek was also the reason behind the construction of the township of Tieri, whose sole purpose was to house the workforce that was required to operate Oaky Creek. Three more mines were opened in the 1990s – Ensham/Yongala, Crinum and Gordonstone (later purchased by Rio Tinto and renamed Kestrel coal mine).

Peak Downs is also an area of intensive agricultural production, which is made possible by its black soil plains and is typified by the abundance and variety of grains in the Shire. Grains planted include sorghum, wheat, barley, sunflower and more recently chickpeas.

== Chairmen and mayors ==
=== Chairmen ===
- 1927: Percy Charles Allan

=== Mayors ===
In 1993, the Local Government Act Number 70 was introduced; it included that all heads of local government councils should be known as mayors and all other elected representatives were to be known as councillors.

- 2008: John Brown
