= Shire of Jericho =

- Local government area
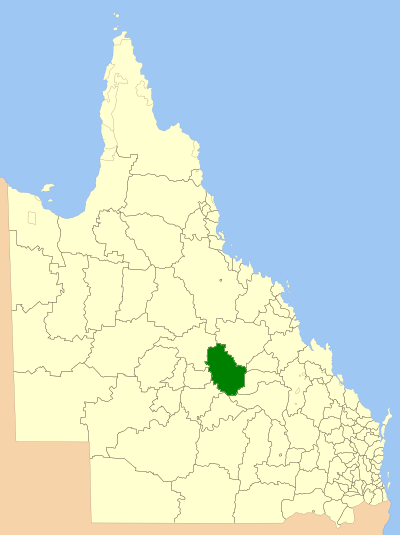
- Location within Queensland

- Country: Australia
- State: Queensland
- Established: 1916
- Council seat: Alpha

Area
  - Total: 21,864.9 km^{2} (8,442.1 sq mi)

Population
  - Total: 920 (2006 census)
  - Density: 0.04208/km^{2} (0.1090/sq mi)
- Website: Shire of Jericho
LGAs around Shire of Jericho
Aramac	Belyando	Belyando
Barcaldine	Shire of Jericho	Peak Downs, Emerald
Blackall	Tambo	Bauhinia

The Shire of Jericho was a local government area in central Queensland between the towns of Barcaldine and Emerald. Administered from the town of Alpha, the Shire covered an area of 21,864.9 square kilometres (8,442.1 sq mi), and existed as a local government entity from 1916 until 2008, when it amalgamated with the Shires of Aramac and Barcaldine to form the Barcaldine Region.

The major industry in the region is beef production.

== History ==
The Kargoolnah Division was created on 11 November 1879 as one of 74 divisions around Queensland under the Divisional Boards Act 1879, covering a large area of central Queensland.

With the passage of the Local Authorities Act 1902, Kargoolnah Division became the Shire of Kargoolnah on 31 March 1903. On 1 January 1916, Jericho split away from Kargoolnah and neighbouring areas to become the separate Shire of Jericho.

On 15 March 2008, under the Local Government (Reform Implementation) Act 2007 passed by the Parliament of Queensland on 10 August 2007, the Shire of Barcaldine merged with the Shires of Aramac and Barcaldine to form the Barcaldine Region.

== Towns and localities ==
The Shire of Jericho included the following settlements:

- Alpha
- Jericho
- Beaufort
- Cudmore
- Dunrobin
- Hobartville
- Pine Hill
- Sedgeford

== Chairmen ==
- 1927: E. J. Presland

== Population ==
Year	Population
1933	1,614
1947	1,479
1954	1,600
1961	1,623
1966	1,501
1971	1,420
1976	1,220
1981	1,177
1986	1,105
1991	1,117
1996	966
2001	1,021
2006	920
