= Shire of Duaringa =

Coordinates: 23°43′03.64″S 149°40′11″E

- Local government area
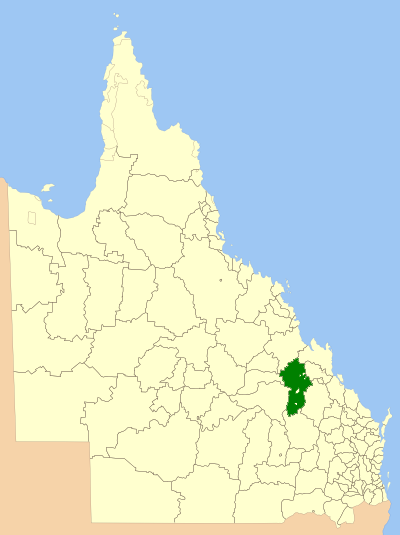
- Location within Queensland

- Country: Australia
- State: Queensland
- Region: Capricornia
- Council seat: Duaringa

Area
  - Total: 18,201 km^{2} (7,027 sq mi)

Population
  - Total: 6,744 (2006 census)
  - Density: 0.37053/km^{2} (0.95967/sq mi)
- Website: Shire of Duaringa
LGAs around Shire of Duaringa
Broadsound	Broadsound	Livingstone
Emerald	Shire of Duaringa	Fitzroy
Bauhinia	Taroom	Banana

The Shire of Duaringa was a local government area in the Capricornia region of Queensland, Australia. Duaringa Shire covered an area of 18,201 square kilometres and had a population of 6,744 according to the 2006 census. On 15 March 2008 the shires of Duaringa, Emerald, Bauhinia and Peak Downs were amalgamated to form the Central Highlands Region.

== History ==
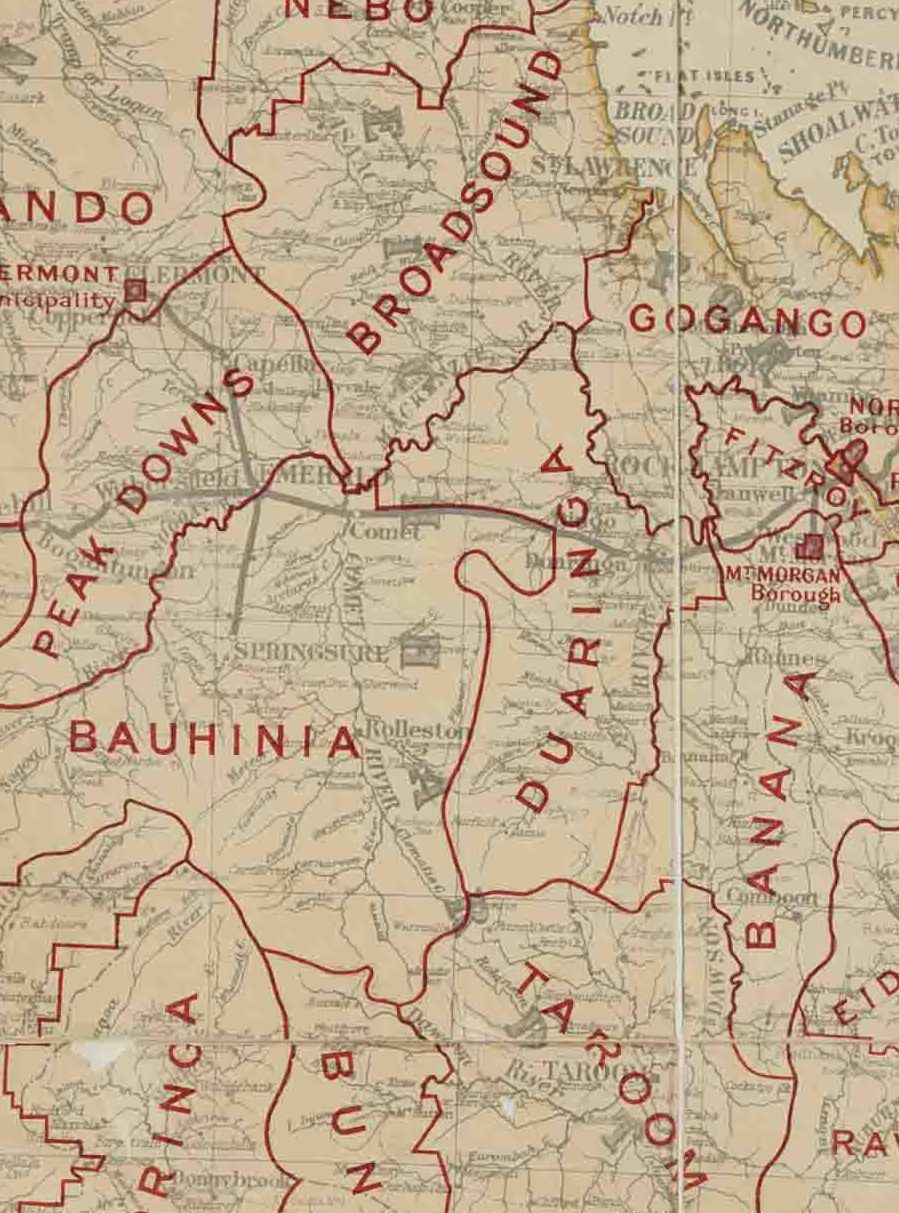
Map of Duaringa Division and adjacent local government areas, March 1902

Banana Division was created on 11 November 1879 as one of 74 divisions around Queensland under the Divisional Boards Act 1879. On 20 April 1881 part of Banana Division was separated to create Duaringa Division.

On 4 January 1884, there was an adjustment of boundaries between Bauhinia Division's subdivisions Nos. 2 and 3 and the Duaringa Division. Soon after, on 20 March 1884, there was a further adjustment of boundaries between Bauhinia Division's subdivisions Nos. 1 and 3 and Duaringa Division.

On 3 March 1892, part of subdivision 2 of the Broadsound Division was transferred to subdivision 3 of the Gogango Division, while another part of subdivision 2 of the Broadsound Division was transferred to the Duaringa Division.

With the passage of the Local Authorities Act 1902, Banana Division became Shire on Banana on 31 March 1903.

On 15 March 2008 the Shires of Duaringa, Emerald, Bauhinia and Peak Downs were amalgamated to form the Central Highlands Region.

== Towns and localities ==
The Shire of Duaringa included the following settlements:

Towns:

- Duaringa
- Dingo
- Blackwater
- Bluff

Township:

- Bauhinia

=== Others ===
The Aboriginal Shire of Woorabinda is located in five separate locations inside the former Shire of Duaringa - three of them wholly surrounded by Duaringa, and two on the border with Fitzroy Shire.

== Economy ==
Duaringa is a local centre for the region's farmers, who cultivate sorghum and wheat, and graze beef cattle. Mining is another major industry within the Shire, due to the vast coal deposits around Blackwater.

== Chairmen ==
- Archibald Francis Dutton (1881) (brother of Charles Boydell Dutton)
- Albert Andrew Wright (1882, 1883, 1884) (father of Phillip Wright)
- John Hay Ross (1885, 1886, 1887, 1888)
- Arthur Herbert MacDonald (1889, 1890, 1891, 1892, 1893)
- William Irving Bell (after whom Bell Park at Emu Park is named) (1892, 1895, 1898, 1907)
- Edmund Dempsey (1894, 1896, 1897, 1901)
- Somerled William MacDonald (1899, 1900)
- Charles Ashmall Barnard (1902, 1903, 1912, 1916, 1917, 1918, 1921–1924, 1924–1927)
- William Officer (1904, 1905, 1906, 1907)
- Henry Greensill Barnard (1908, 1909)
- Peter Diamond (1910, 1911, 1912, 1919)
- Richard Stewart Walsh (1913, 1914, 1915)
- Henry Richard Bauman (1920)
- James Thomas Dunne (1927–1930)
- Lorne Alexander MacKenzie (1930–1933)
- Edward Adams (1933–1936,1936–1939, 1939–1943, 1943–1946)
- Harold Park (1946–1949, 1949–1952, 1952–1955, 1955–1958)
- William Graeme (Tom) Graham (1958–1961, 1961–1964)
- Harold Joseph George Bauman (1964–1967, 1967–1970, 1970–1973)
- William Kerrod Park OBE (1973–1976, 1976–1979, 1979–1982, 1982–1985, 1985–1988, 1988–1991, 1991–1994)
- Tom Hall (1994–1997, 1997–2000, 2000–2004)
- Gary Howard (2004–2008)
