= Shire of Emerald =

Coordinates: 23°31′05.5″S 148°09′37.4″E

- Local government area
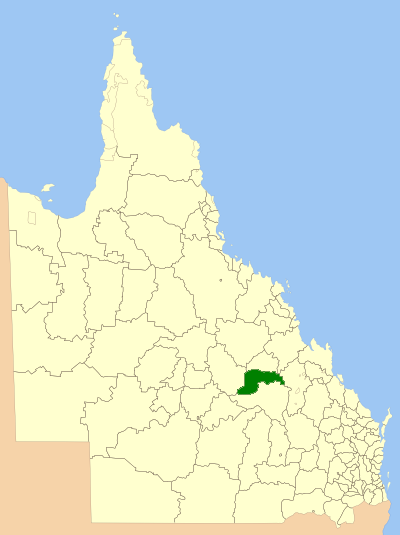
- Location within Queensland

- Country: Australia
- State: Queensland
- Region: Central Highlands
- Council seat: Emerald

Population
  - Total: 14,355 (2006 census)
- Website: Shire of Emerald
LGAs around Shire of Emerald
Jericho	Peak Downs	Broadsound
Jericho	Shire of Emerald	Duaringa
Bauhinia	Bauhinia	Bauhinia

The Shire of Emerald is a former local government area in the Central Highlands region of Queensland, Australia. On 15 March 2008 the shires of Duaringa, Emerald, Bauhinia and Peak Downs were amalgamated to form the Central Highlands Region. Its administrative centre is based around Emerald.

== History ==
The Emerald Division was separated from the Peak Downs Division on 4 June 1902.

On 31 March 1903, Emerald Division became the Shire of Emerald.

== Towns and localities ==
The Shire of Emerald included the following settlements:

Towns:

- Bogantungan
- Comet
- Emerald
- Fernlees
- Gindie
- Withersfield
- Yamala

Gemfields area:

- Anakie
- Rubyvale
- Sapphire
- The Willows

== Chairmen ==
- 1927: W. H. Harris
- 1979 – 1982: Craig Edmonston
- 1985 – 1989: Craig Edmonston
- 1989 – 1991: Ted Staal
- 1991 – 2000: Paul Bell
- 2000 – 2008: Peter Maguire
