= Shire of Blackall =

Coordinates: 24.593°S 145.441°E

- Local government area
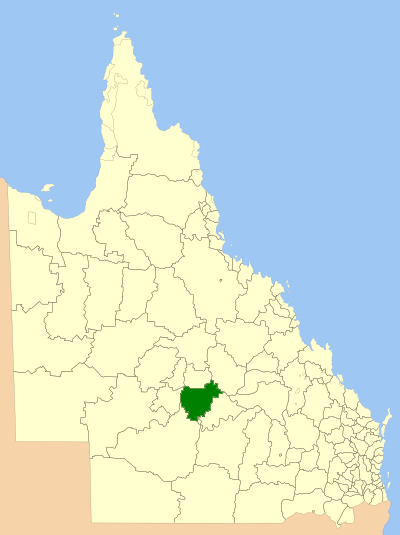
- Location within Queensland

- Country: Australia
- State: Queensland
- Established: 1879
- Council seat: Blackall

Area
  - Total: 16,366.8 km^{2} (6,319.3 sq mi)

Population
  - Total: 1,524 (2006 census)
  - Density: 0.093115/km^{2} (0.24117/sq mi)
LGAs around Shire of Blackall
Ilfracombe	Barcaldine	Jericho
Isisford	Shire of Blackall	Tambo
Quilpie	Quilpie	Tambo

The Shire of Blackall was a local government area located in central Queensland around the town of Blackall. It covered an area of 16,366.8 square kilometres (6,319.3 sq mi), and existed as a local government entity from 1879 until 2008, when it amalgamated with neighbouring Shire of Tambo to form the Blackall-Tambo Region.

The council consisted of a Mayor and 9 elected councillors. No wards or electoral divisions existed.

The Barcoo River passes through the shire's former area and the dominant industry is sheep and cattle grazing.

== History ==
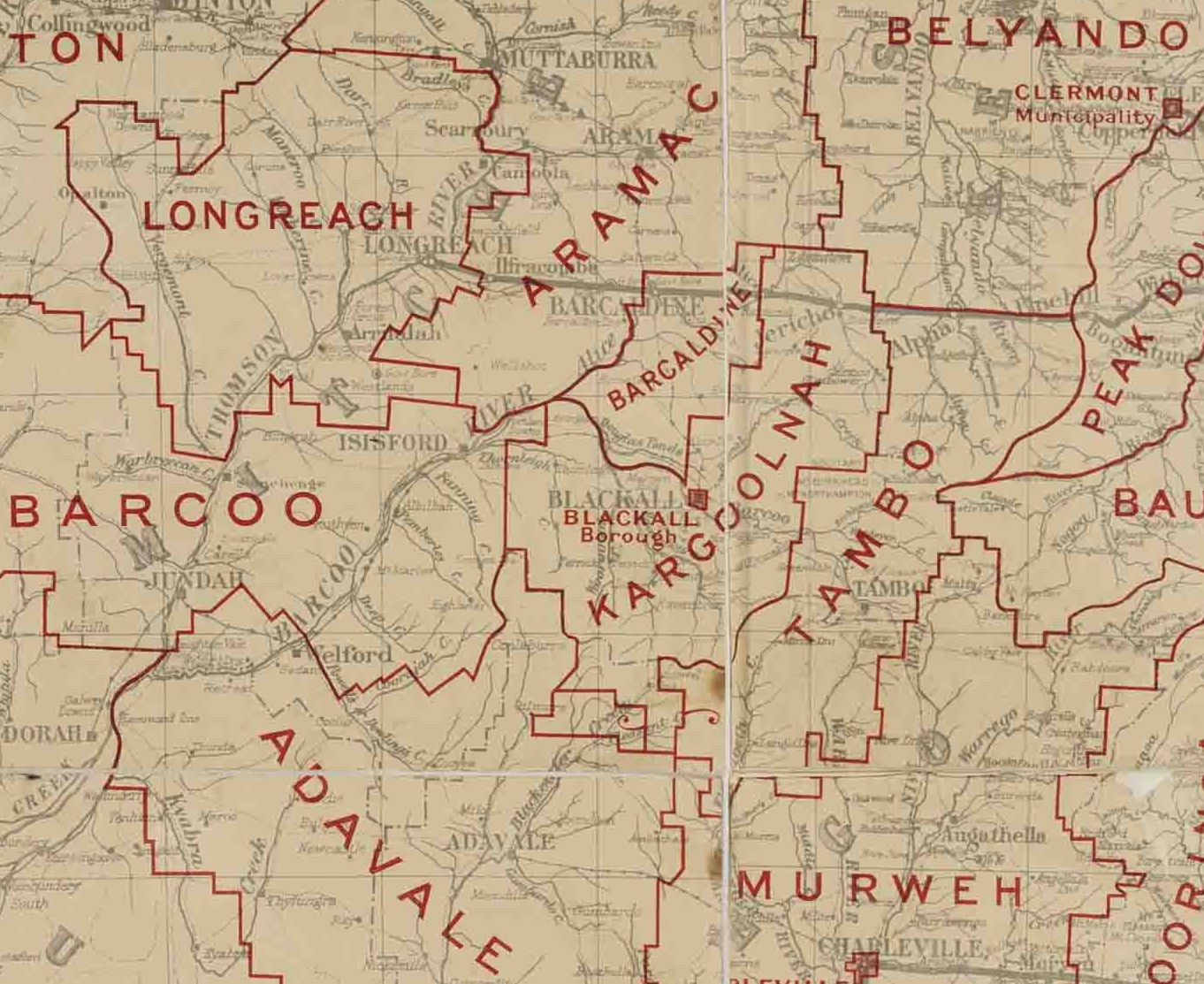
Map of Kargoolnah Division and adjacent local government areas, March 1902

Kargoolnah Division was created on 11 November 1879 as one of 74 divisions around Queensland under the Divisional Boards Act 1879 with a population of 726. The division included the areas of Blackall, Tambo and Barcaldine and parts of Jericho (these areas are now part of the Barcaldine Region). Its headquarters were in Blackall.

On 20 May 1880, the urban part of Blackall was excised from the Kargoolnah Division to create a municipal Borough of Blackall and its first councillors were elected in July 1880.

On 30 June 1881 part of Kargoolnah Division was excised to create Tambo Division, and on 25 August 1892 a further part was excised to create Barcaldine Division.

With the passage of the Local Authorities Act 1902, Kargoolnah Division became the Shire of Kargoolnah on 31 March 1903, while the Borough of Blackall became the Town of Blackall. The town was abolished on 7 November 1931 and became Division 3 of the Shire of Kargoolnah, which had in the meantime shrunk to include only the Blackall region.

On 19 November 1932, after representations to the State Government, the Shire of Kargoolnah was officially renamed Shire of Blackall.

On 15 March 2008, under the Local Government (Reform Implementation) Act 2007 passed by the Parliament of Queensland on 10 August 2007, the Shire of Blackall merged with the Shire of Tambo to form the Blackall-Tambo Region.

== Towns and localities ==
The Shire of Blackall included the following settlements:

- Blackall
- Yalleroi (ghost town)
- Northampton Downs
- Terrick Terrick
- Malvern Hills
- Alice Downs

== Population ==
Year	Population
1933	2,755
1947	2,488
1954	2,780
1961	3,291
1966	3,067
1971	2,325
1976	2,160
1981	2,223
1986	2,070
1991	2,045
1996	1,833
2001	1,822
2006	1,524

== Chairmen ==
- 1891: A. Parnell
- 1927: S. Blackstock

In 1993, the Local Government Act Number 70 was introduced; it included that all heads of local government councils should be known as mayors and all other elected representatives were to be known as councillors.
