= John M Headrick & Co Building =

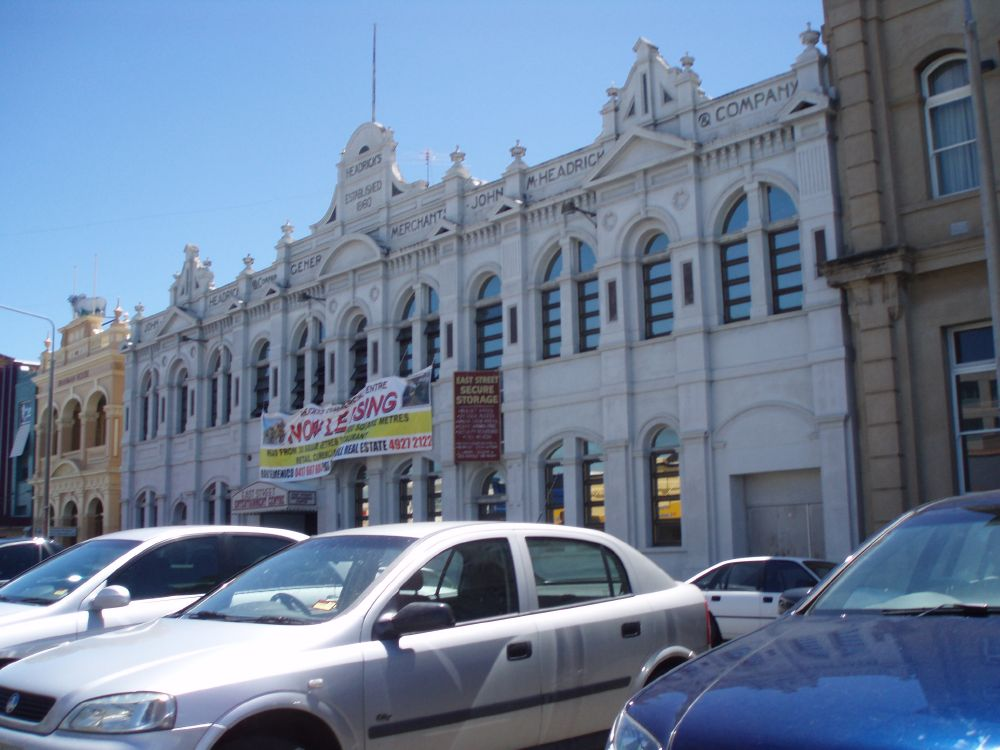
- Former John M Headrick & Co Building, 2008

- Location within Queensland Location within Australia
- 23.3809°S 150.5158°E
- Location: 187 East Street, Rockhampton, Rockhampton Region, Queensland, Australia

History
- Design period: 1870s–1890s (late 19th century)
- Built: 1894–1895

Site notes
- Architect: Alfred Mowbray Hutton
- Architectural style: Classicism

Queensland Heritage Register
- Official name: John M Headrick & Co. Building (former), Burns Philp & Co. – Vigor, John Headricks Building, Pinnochio's Nite Club; East Street Entertainment Centre
- Type: state heritage (built)
- Designated: 21 October 1992
- Reference no.: 600793
- Significant period: 1890s–1910s (fabric); 1895–1990s (historical use)
- Builders: Holmes & Henrickson

John M Headrick & Co Building is a heritage-listed former warehouse at 187 East Street, Rockhampton, Rockhampton Region, Queensland, Australia. It was designed by Alfred Mowbray Hutton and built from 1894 to 1895 by Holmes & Henrickson. It is also known as Burns Philp & Co – Vigor, John Headricks Building, Pinnochio's Nite Club, and East Street Entertainment Centre. It was added to the Queensland Heritage Register on 21 October 1992.

== History ==
The first two-storeyed brick-and-render section of the John M Headrick & Co Building was constructed in 1894–95 to house the offices and stores of that mercantile company. It was designed by the architect Alfred Mowbray Hutton. Carrying through the classical motifs employed in the earlier design while almost trebling its frontage on East Street, the architect Edwin Morton Hockings renovated and greatly extended the building in 1911.

Rockhampton was established beside the Fitzroy River on land that was originally part of Gracemere, a pastoral property taken up by the Archer family in the 1850s. Following a gold discovery at Canoona station and a survey by Arthur F Wood, the town of Rockhampton was proclaimed on 25 October 1858. Wood had worked with the surveyor Robert Hoddle in laying out Melbourne, and the author of the town plan, Francis Clarke, was Victoria's surveyor general at the time. The involvement of these people may explain a certain similarity between each city's plans, as well as, in terms of Queensland, the uncommon generosity of scale with which Rockhampton was laid out. The Rockhampton Municipal Council was formed on 15 December 1860.

The patriarch of the Headrick family, John Mackay Headrick Snr, emigrated to Geelong in the colony of Victoria from the Scottish Lowlands in 1852 at age 32. He arrived in Rockhampton ten years later, and after two years he and a friend from Geelong, EP Livermore, established a business (Headrick, Livermore & Co) on East Street just off Archer Street in the northern corner of the burgeoning town centre. Over the 20 year course of their partnership, the business was simply known as Headrick & Co and operated from various locations in East Street.

Around 1880, Headrick, Livermore & Co was sold to Messrs Aplin, Brown & Co, and JM Headrick Snr dropped out of Rockhampton commercial life. This company, along with the business of Capt RM Hunter, was bought by a southern firm and became Sloan & Co. The mercantile branch of this business was then sold to Mr EK Ogg during the time that John Mackay Headrick Jnr was working for it. In July 1884 JM Headrick Jnr and Andrew Newton bought the mercantile business from Ogg and started JM Headrick & Co in premises on East Street located between William and Derby Streets. Toward the end of the same year, Headrick Snr died at his residence on the Athelstane Range.

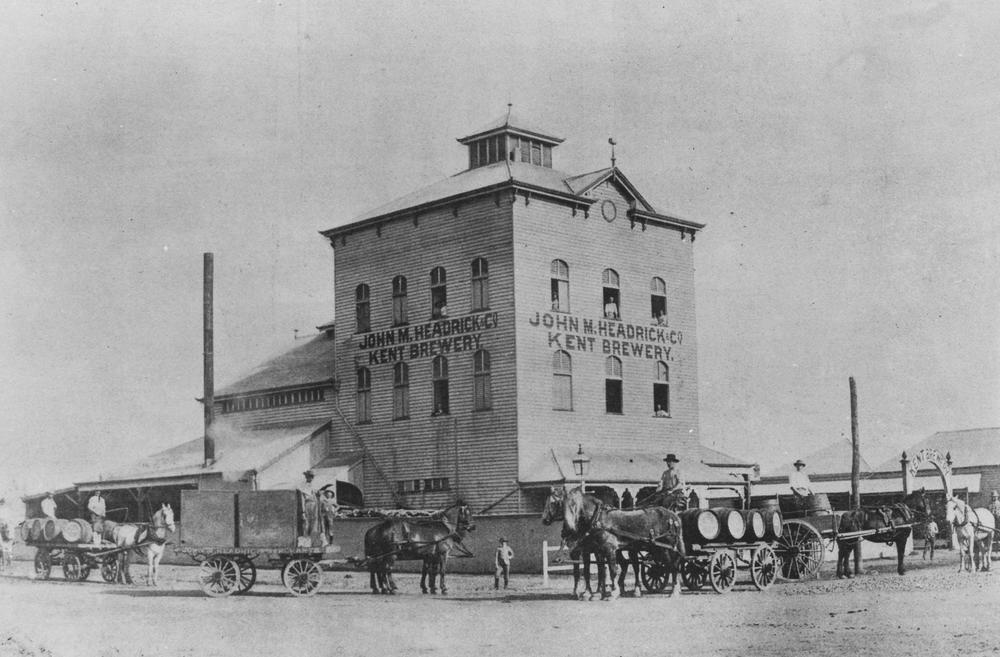
JM Headrick & Co's Kent Brewery, Rockhampton, 1895

JM Headrick Jnr ran the business alone until taking on his younger brother, Arthur Edward Hutchison Headrick, as partner in 1893. Sometime prior to this Newton had retired. The 1890s was a period characterised by droughts and floods, which resulted in economic depression and hardship for the colony. Despite these conditions, JM Headrick & Co purchased Kent Brewery on the corner of Bolsover and Albert Streets in 1894, retaining it until 1905. In the same year, due to a growth in its trade business, the company built the warehouse on East Street that is the subject of this entry. It was the first architectural commission in Rockhampton undertaken by the architect Alfred Mowbray Hutton. The contractors were Messrs Holmes and Henrikson. The three subdivisions of land upon which this building was constructed had been part of an allotment originally purchased in 1860 by Sarah Maria Pitts. The relevant subdivisions had been purchased by JM Headrick Snr in 1883 and their title was transferred to his wife after his death the following year. It was not until 1926 that title was transferred to JM Headrick & Co.

AM Hutton had been born in Victoria, and practiced there before taking over the Rockhampton practice of James Flint, to whom he was related by marriage, in mid-1894. He also designed a hotel for JM Headrick & Co at Lake's Creek the following year. Hutton practiced widely in Rockhampton, both as a sole practitioner and in partnership with EM Hockings, who was to design the later extension of the Headrick company's East Street premises. The former Mount Morgan Gold Mining Company Building (now the ABC Capricornia studios) in Quay Street was also designed by Hutton in 1897–98. He and Hockings completed design projects elsewhere in East Street during the term of their partnership, which lasted from 1898 until 1904. Hutton died in July 1911.

JM Headrick & Co took over their new building in 1895. An advertisement in the 1897–99 Queensland Post Office Directory describes the company as general merchants and importers; station, receiving, forwarding and custom house agents; wine and spirit merchants, as well as brewers. Their offices and warehouse are noted as being in East Street. A 1901 advertisement gives their precise address on East Street as No. 201.

In September 1898 JM Headrick Jnr died at age 38 leaving the business to be carried on by his brother Arthur. The former had been born in Geelong and had worked for the Bank of New South Wales in its Clermont branch prior to coming to Rockhampton and establishing the company bearing his name.

Title for two further subdivisions of the original allotment bought by SM Pitts was transferred to AEH Headrick and JM Headrick's widow, Annie Isabel, in 1909.

In 1911, using the additional subdivisions purchased in 1909, the East Street warehouse was extended in accordance with a design by EM Hockings, who was born in 1870 in Brisbane. He first moved to Rockhampton in 1890 after winning a competition to design the Rockhampton Girls Grammar School. Richard Gailey's firm, to which Hockings was articled, took over documentation of the project and he assumed the role of clerk of works. Hockings began his own practice in Rockhampton in 1895. The 1911 refurbishment he undertook trebled the size of the premises of JM Headrick & Co. Essentially his design repeated the basic template established by the earlier 1894–95 building, creating a coordinated facade out of three replications of it.

A photo in the Rockhampton District Historical Society collection, which was taken after completion of the 1911 extension, shows the signage on the building that remains in place in 2003. A second photograph from this collection depicts the original East Street building, before renovation (refer below). While the street facade of the 1911 extension is fully rendered with cement, only certain elements on the earlier facade are, the underlying brick being visible over much of it. A single-storey house and the AMP Building adjoin either side of the property, which also had a gently curved footpath canopy supported on cast iron columns.

In 1923 AEH Headrick died and John M Headrick & Co was converted into a limited liability company with FM Sealy, who had joined in 1885, made Managing Director. JAC Headrick, the elder son of JM Headrick Jnr, was made a Director, as was HJ Myles, the son-in-law of AEH Headrick. An April 1926 Morning Bulletin article describes this company as 'wine, spirit, hardware, and general merchants, station agents, receiving, forwarding, shipping, insurance and custom house agents, and direct importers of flour, teas, sugars, tobaccos, crockery, glassware, saddlery, wool pack, fencing wire, sheep shears, oil stores, and all station, hotel and storekeepers requisites, wines and spirits, and bulk and bottled ale and stout.'

It is not until the early 1980s that the title on the entire property, including all five subdivisions, was transferred out of the Headrick company. At this time extensive alterations were carried out. Sometime during the 1970s, the building and business was owned and occupied by Burns Philp & Co, the mercantile and shipping company having a long association with central and northern Queensland. Under the 1990s tenure of new owners, the building was converted into a nightclub. In 2016, the building is used for as a real estate office. In 2017, the left side, and top floors, of the building were renovated to showcase Headricks Lane - a brewery/restaurant that gained its title from the heritage ownership of the building.

== Description ==
The John M Headrick & Co Building is located on a block of East Street, bounded to the south-east and north-west respectively by Derby and William Streets, and populated with a number of other buildings of heritage significance. Those listed on the Queensland Heritage Register include: the Walter Reid Community Arts Centre and the AMP Building, each of which is adjacent to the property under discussion. Further to the north-west on East Street are located the Rockhampton Post Office and Rockhampton Court House Precinct, both of which are listed on the Queensland Heritage Register and the Australian Heritage Commission's Register of the National Estate.

The street frontage of this two-storey, rendered brick building is approximately 33.5 metres (110 ft) long. It extends back almost 46 metres (151 ft) to Quay Lane, which runs along the north-eastern edge of the five occupied allotments. This subsidiary road forms part of a system of laneways that inhabits the city centre's orthogonal grid and services its primary streets. The grid is aligned to the course of the Fitzroy River that flows from the north-west to the south-east. The John M Headrick & Co Building is situated within the central business district of Rockhampton; the main pedestrian mall is two blocks to the north-west, the river is a block away to the north-east, and the central railway station five blocks to the south-east.

The area covered by this warehouse building totals almost 1,350 square metres (14,500 sq ft). Its brick shell is articulated throughout with cement render; the painted front facade to East Street being ornately treated with freely employed classical motifs. It is composed of three major segments, each consisting of three bays formed with two framing and two centrally disposed engaged piers, which are topped by a course of pediments and a decorated parapet. Single narrow bays join the three segments. A number of striking horizontal lines are modelled across the front facade: a pedestal or base line, a stringcourse above the ground storey windows, a continuous sill line to the upper storey windows, a line of parapets above these openings, and a capping course running through the parapet. These do not interrupt the verticality created by the repetition of bays along the length of the facade.

The central facade segment is surmounted by a decorated parapet projection that spans the width of its three constituent bays. The two centrally disposed engaged piers are topped with a curved pediment, while the two framing piers are each topped with a small triangular pediment moulding. In the parapet, a small, semicircular gable and projecting panel supported either side by curved brackets mirror the curve in the pediment below. The words 'Headrick's' and "Established 1860" are lettered on this part of the ornate parapet. Above each framing pier and their pediments the parapet is articulated with a pedestal-like moulding.

The two flanking segments of the front facade are similarly modelled, however, their central bays are surmounted by triangular pediments and lower, generally triangular projections on the parapet. Each pedestal- like projection on the parapet that is without further decoration is topped with an urn. Across the parapet panel that spans the length of the front facade, and between the pedestal modellings, are inserted the words "John M - Headrick - & Company - General Merchants - John - Headrick - & Company".

The line of pediments sits on a cornice-like stringcourse supported on numerous miniature consoles. The central bay of each facade segment is narrower that the ones that flank it. On the upper level of the facade, the top half of all flanking piers in this system are fluted. Within the central bay is a window with three transoms and a fanlight. The moulding course that separates fanlight from window is carried through on all upper storey windows. These central windows are decorated with semicircular label moulds and keystones. The flanking windows in this system are wider and divided in two by a rendered mullion. They have three transoms and fanlights split in two by the mullion. The shafts of the engaged piers that correspond to this level of the building are simply modelled in their faces addressing East Street.

The pattern of openings on the ground storey section of the facade is not as regular as that described above. There are narrow windows with fanlights located in the central bays of two of the three facade segments. The opening in the remaining segment is a door with fanlight. Those windows that flank them are generally divided in two by a rendered mullion, as are the ones above, but the arches to their fanlights are flatter. All windows on this level have four transoms. The segment adjoining the AMP Building to the north-west of this property is the only one that conforms generally to the pattern suggested in the overall facade design. A large opening pierces the northern side of the central segment, while a smaller, shuttered opening fills the final bay on the south-eastern end adjoining the Walter Reid Community Arts Centre. A narrow canvas canopy has been installed above the widest opening, which currently serves as entry to the entertainment/nightclub premises. A series of Tuscan-style pilasters decorate the engaged piers to the ground storey.

On the rear facade of the building addressing Quay Lane, there are four triangular, gable-like projections to the parapet. The surface of the facade is roughly cement rendered with a number of openings on the ground level, a large one of which at the northern end appears to have been closed up. On the upper level the only openings are in the bay surmounted by the triangular parapet projection adjacent to the allotment that houses the AMP Building. There are three: the central window is tall and narrow, has a highlight and is divided by four transoms; and the flanking two are shorter but also have highlights and four transoms. These windows are evenly disposed over the width of the bay and each have projecting sills.

There are five downpipes and rainwater heads fixed to this facade. Two frame the northernmost bay, while two more are centred on the apexes of the southernmost facade sections. A final downpipe is fitted at the southern end of the facade. Given that the northernmost bay corresponds to the part of this building that was constructed first in 1894–95, and the position of the downpipes, it is likely that its roof between East Street and Quay Lane was a gable. The only other visible facade is that which faces the north-western allotment. It is rendered in a similar fashion to the rear facade and has no windows.

=== Interiors ===
The long corridor of building that corresponds to that which was constructed in 1894–95 is still evident in the ground floor layout. A long wall with engaged piers separates this section of the building from the larger part added during the renovations of 1911. In early 2003, the latter component of the building was being used as an entertainment centre with a nightclub above. Entry to the upper storey venue could either be gained via the shuttered opening on the front facade and a large flight of stairs, or via a second flight of stairs positioned against the dividing interior wall. The large ground floor entertainment tenancy was occupied by a series of brick piers. At the rear of this space, a store and services facilities have been installed.

== Heritage listing ==
The former John M Headrick & Co Building was listed on the Queensland Heritage Register on 21 October 1992 having satisfied the following criteria.

The place is important in demonstrating the evolution or pattern of Queensland's history.

The history of the John M Headrick & Co Building, erected in 1894–95 and extended in 1911, demonstrates the changing pattern of mercantile trading in a major regional centre of Queensland. The company was associated with the commercial life of Rockhampton from the boom decade of the 1880s for over 100 years. The building carrying its name occupied a prominent location in the heart of the city throughout that period.

The place is important in demonstrating the principal characteristics of a particular class of cultural places.

The structure retains the chief characteristics of a commercial premises built and extended during Australia's Federation Period; the street facade is articulated with freely employed classical details common among such buildings, while the unadorned side and rear facades reflect its utilitarian purposes.

The place is important because of its aesthetic significance.

Although its interior has been greatly altered, the John M Headrick & Co building maintains a strong presence in the commercial heart of Rockhampton and along the streetscape of East Street. Because of this it is aesthetically important. It sits between the former AMP Building and the Walter Reid Community Arts Centre.

The place has a special association with the life or work of a particular person, group or organisation of importance in Queensland's history.

The building, still bearing the name of its most long-lived occupants John M Headrick & Co, has a strong connection with the Headrick family, whose business and civic interests in Rockhampton began as early as 1862. It is also an example of the work of prominent Queensland architect EM Hockings. The design of its East Street facade owes a great deal to the "free classical" concepts employed by AM Hutton the designer of the original building component. He was a well-known local architect who designed many buildings in the city's historical central business district, including the Mount Morgan Gold Mining Company Building (or ABC Studios) on Quay Street. This was his first Rockhampton commission.
