= Tieri =

- Town
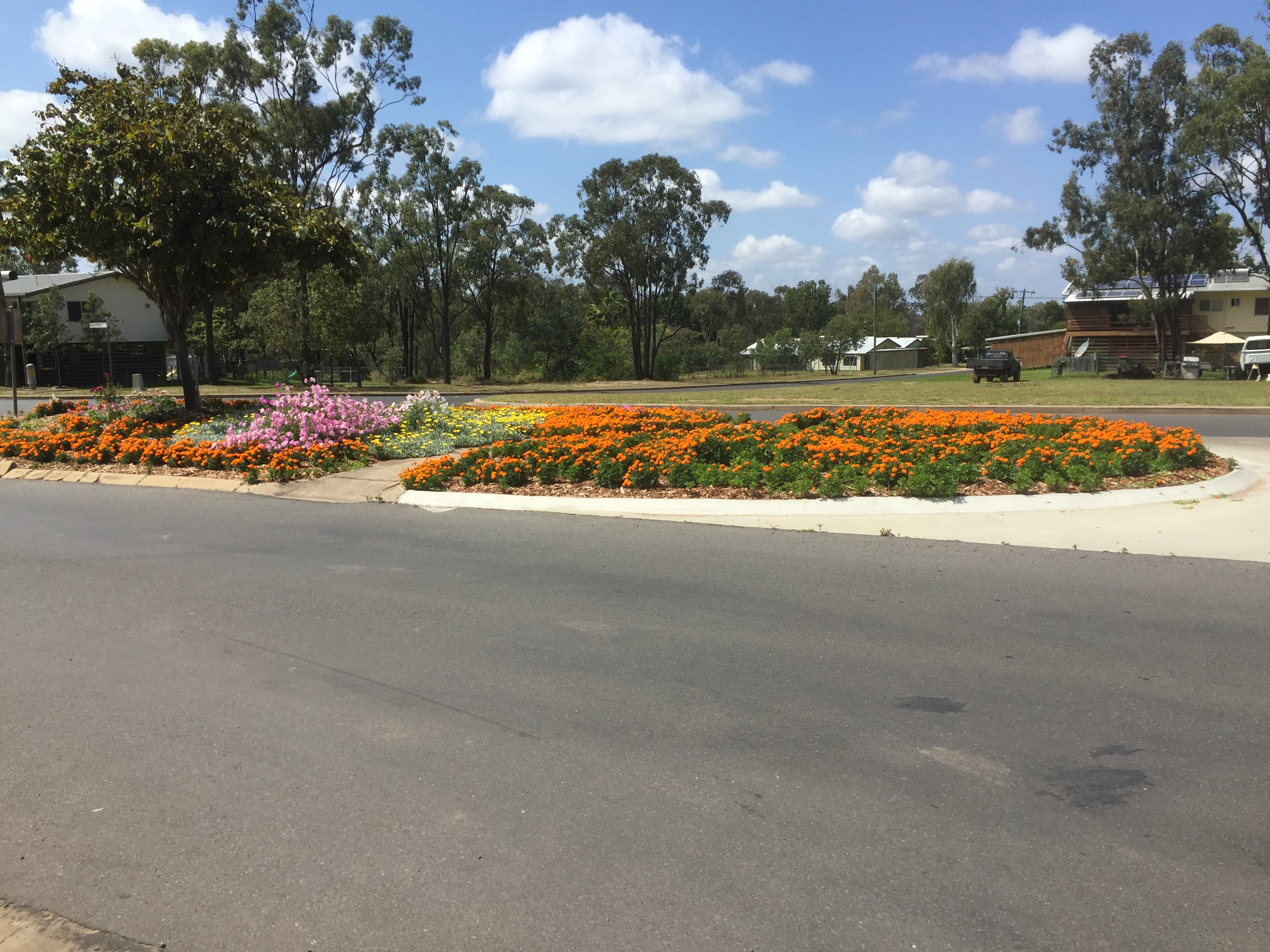
- Tieri streetscape, September 2016

- Interactive map of Tieri
- Coordinates: 23.0352°S 148.3486°E
- Country: Australia
- State: Queensland
- LGA: Central Highlands Region
- Location: 36.1 km (22.4 mi) E of Capella; 87.5 km (54.4 mi) NE of Emerald; 307 km (191 mi) WNW of Rockhampton; 919 km (571 mi) NW of Brisbane
- Established: 1983

Government
  - State electorate: Gregory
  - Federal division: Capricornia

Area
  - Total: 11.5 km^{2} (4.4 sq mi)

Population
  - Total: 732 (2021 census)
  - Density: 63.7/km^{2} (164.9/sq mi)
- Time zone: UTC+10:00 (AEST)
- Postcode: 4709
Localities around Tieri
Lilyvale	Lilyvale	Lilyvale
Lilyvale	Tieri	Lilyvale
Lilyvale	Lilyvale	Lilyvale

Tieri /tiˈɛəri/ is a small mining town and rural locality in the Central Highlands Region, Queensland, Australia. Established in 1983, the town is a service centre for local coal mines, similar to nearby Middlemount and Dysart,

In the 2021 census, the locality of Tieri had a population of 732 people.

== Geography ==
The locality is an "island" within the locality of Lilyvale. The German Creek (towards Middlemount), Oaky Creek Coal No.1 & North and Gregory Crinum mines (Emerald) are situated close by.

== History ==
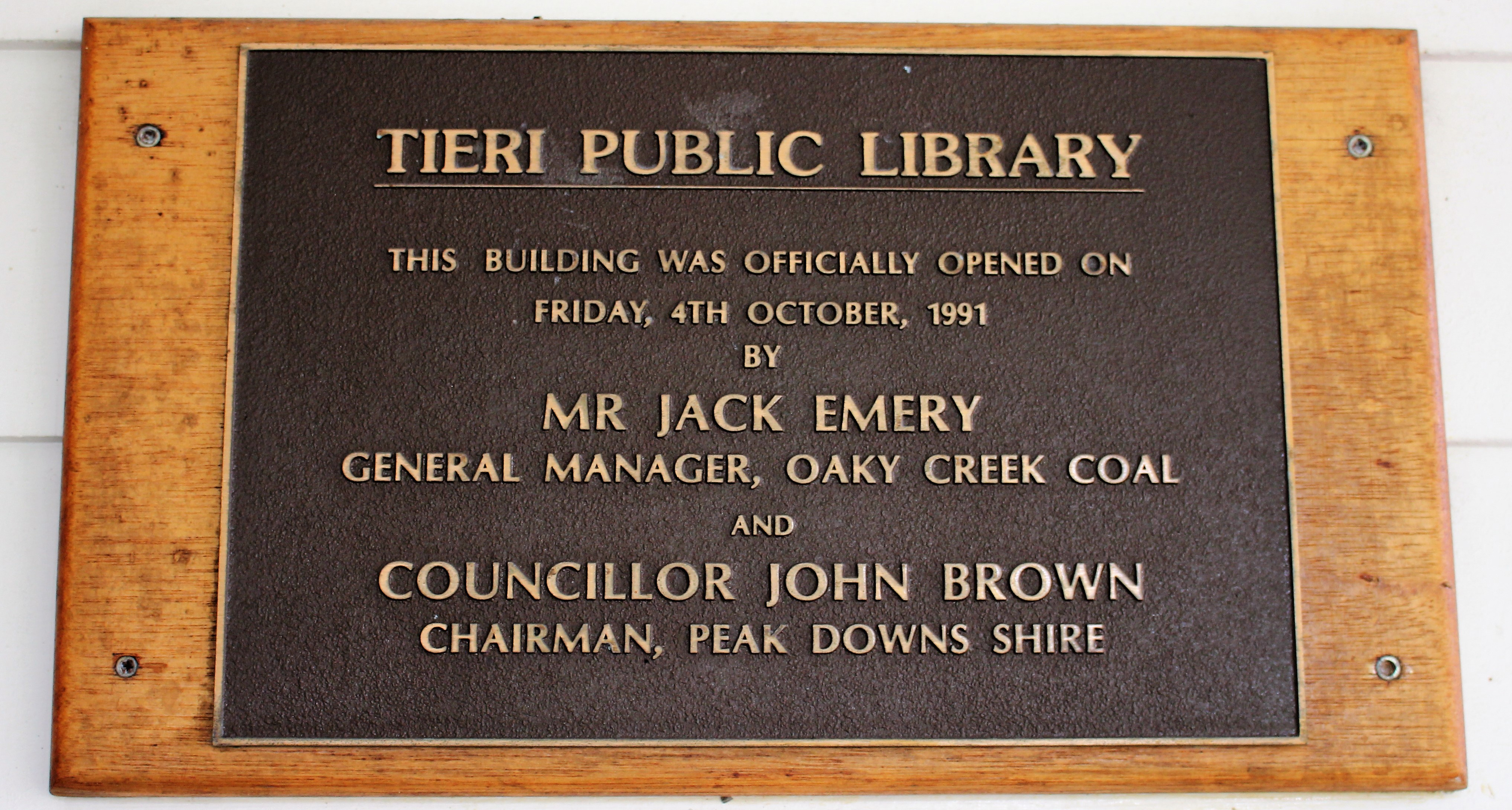
Plaque commemorating the 1991 opening of Tieri Library, 2017

Oaky Creek Mine State School opened on 30 January 1979 and closed on 10 September 1982 with replacement Tieri State School opening on 24 January 1983.

Tieri Library opened on 4 October 1991.

Tieri War Memorial was unveiled in 1994.

== Demographics ==
In the 2011 census, the locality of Tieri had a population of 2012.

In the 2016 census, the locality of Tieri had a population of 1,129 people.

In the 2021 census, the locality of Tieri had a population of 732 people.

== Heritage listings ==
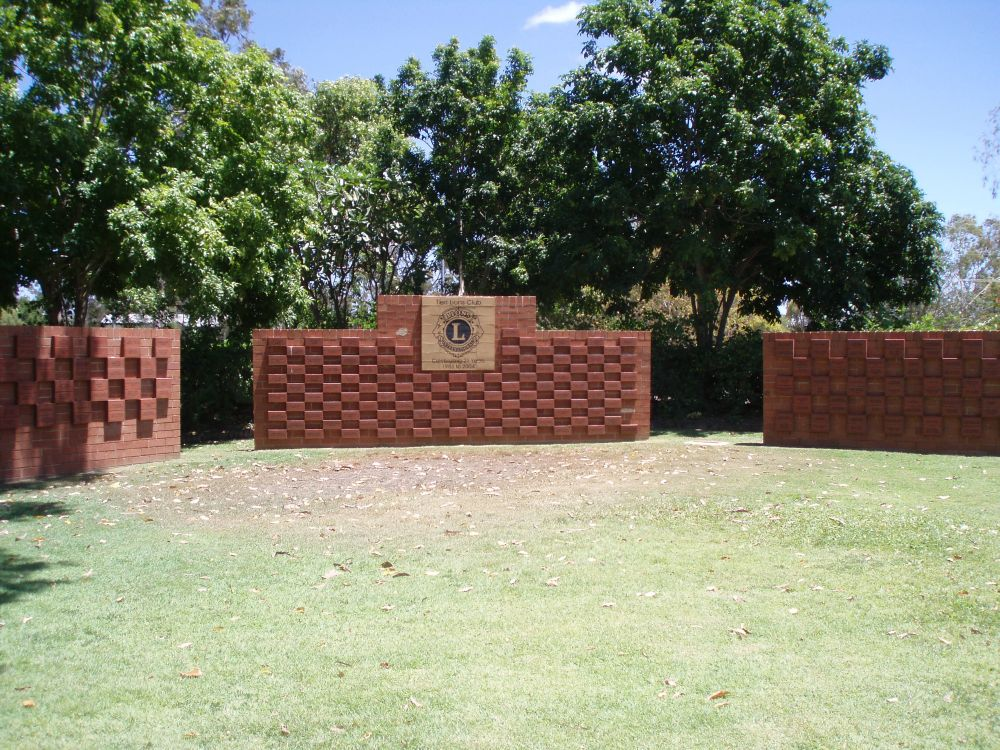
Tieri War Memorial, 2006

Tieri has a number of heritage-listed sites, including:

- Tieri War Memorial, Talagai Avenue (23.035°S 148.3427°E)

== Education ==
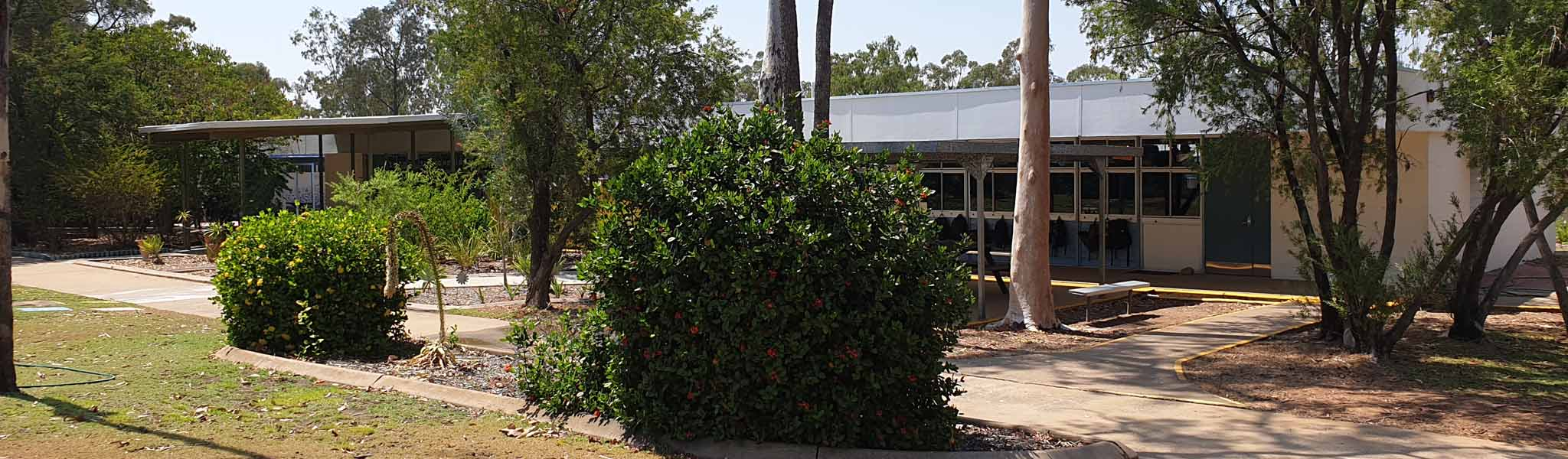
Tieri State School building, 2020

Tieri State School is a government primary (Prep–6) school for boys and girls at 1 Bottlebrush Lane (23.0304°S 148.3441°E). In 2018, the school had an enrolment of 95 students with 8 teachers and 11 non-teaching staff (8 full-time equivalent). The school motto is "Strive for Success".

There are no secondary schools in Tieri. The nearest government secondary school is Capella State High School in Capella to the west.

== Amenities ==
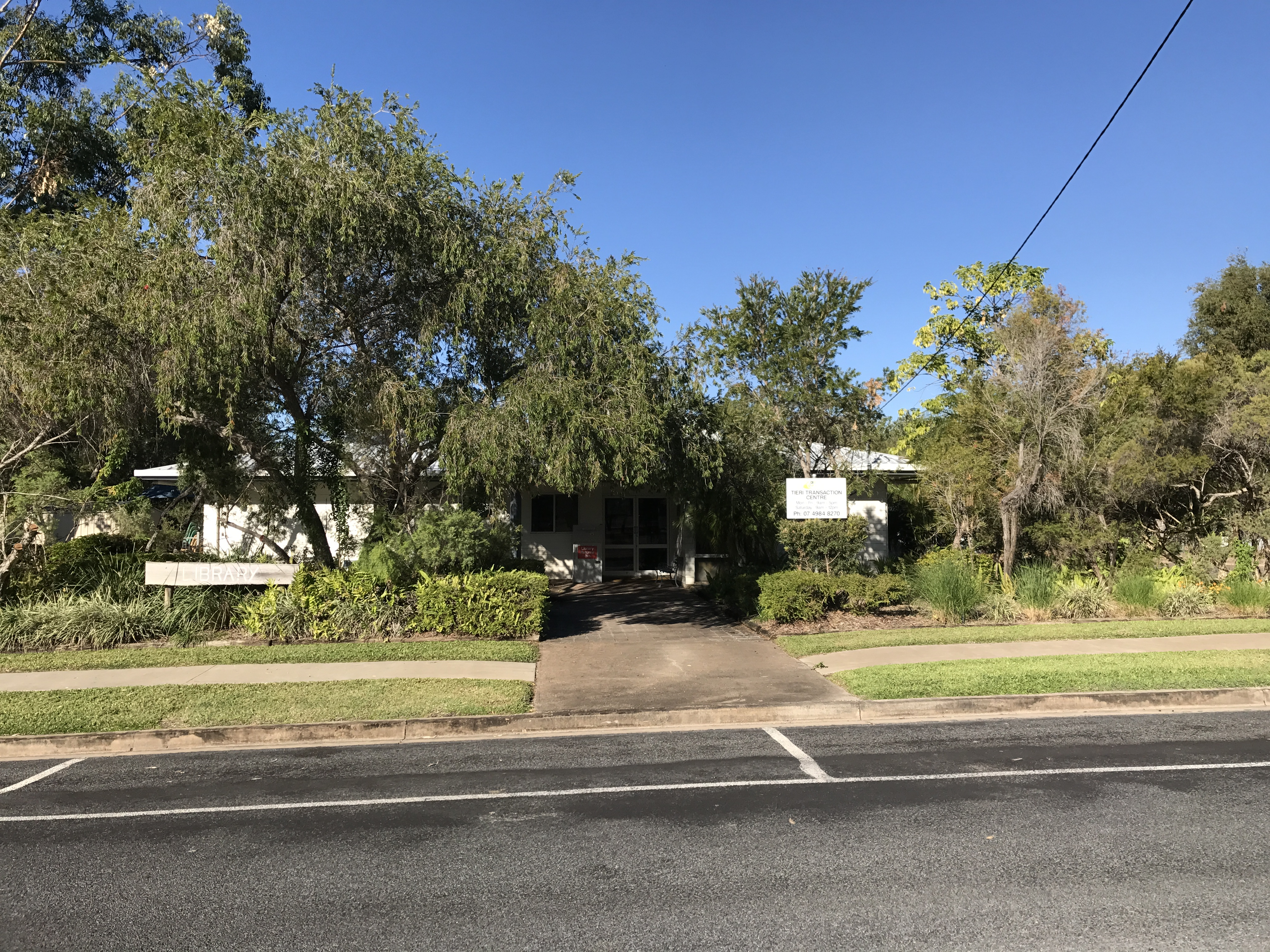
Tieri Library, 2018

According to an early resident, writing in 2010, there were no facilities when people moved to the town. There were no shops and a bank visited once a week. Tieri now has a whole range of shops for a mining town. Tieri has bush trails for mountain, quad and dirt bikes. The nearest purpose built motocross track is in Middlemount approximately 40 kilometres (25 mi) away.

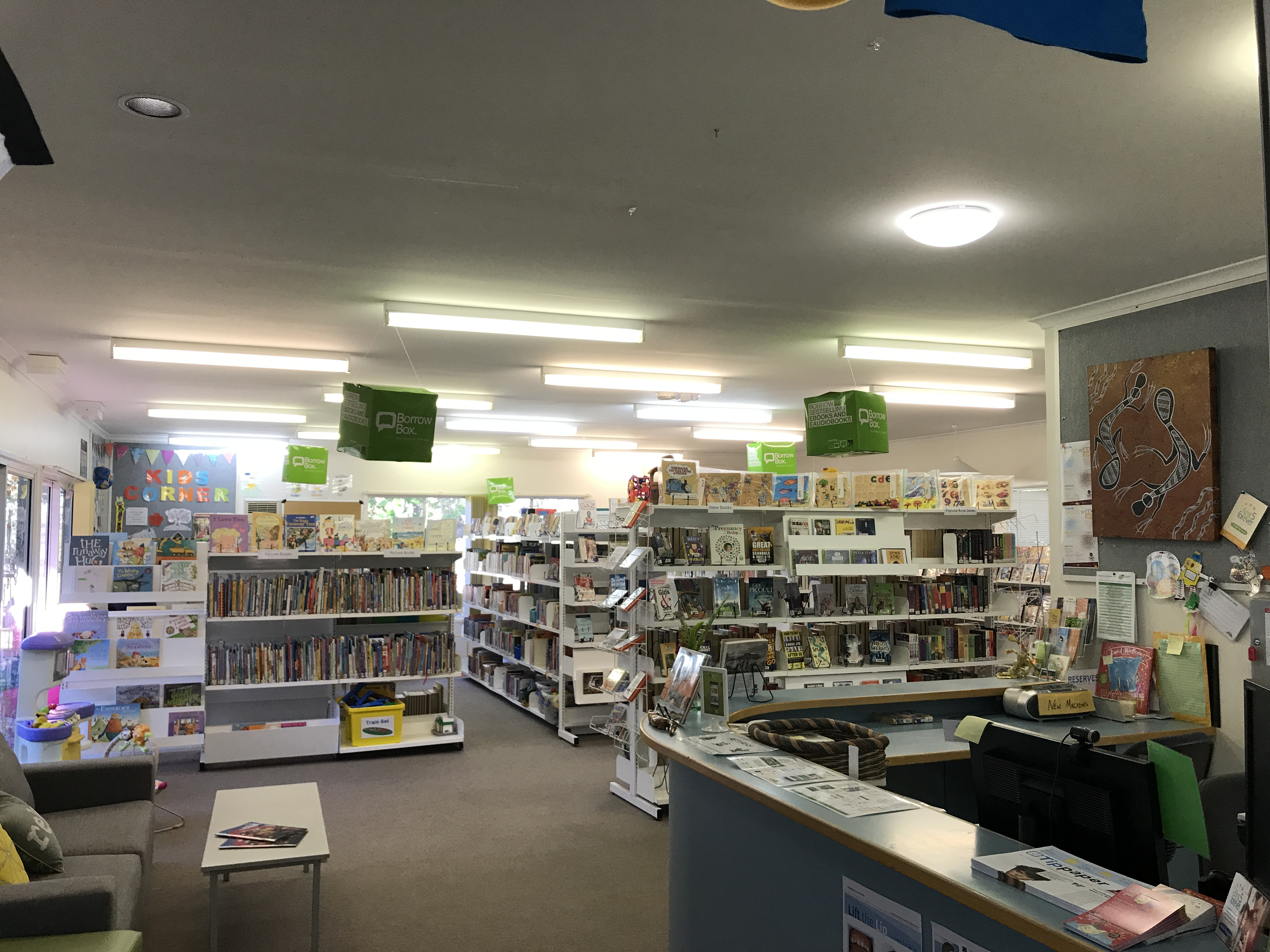
Library interior, 2018

Central Highlands Regional Council operates Tieri Library at the corner of Grasstree and Anncrouye Streets, Tieri.

== Notable residents ==
- Mitchell Langerak, footballer play from Tieri
