= Coorumbene, Queensland =

Coorumbene
- Suburb
- Interactive map of Coorumbene
- Coordinates: 24.5594°S 148.7486°E
- Country: Australia
- State: Queensland
- LGA: Central Highlands Region
- Location: 12.7 km (7.9 mi) SE of Rolleston; 83.5 km (51.9 mi) SE of Springsure; 152 km (94 mi) SSE of Emerald; 285 km (177 mi) SW of Rockhampton; 680 km (420 mi) NW of Brisbane

Government
  - State electorate: Gregory
  - Federal division: Flynn

Area
  - Total: 397.9 km^{2} (153.6 sq mi)
- Elevation: 210 to 270 m (690 to 890 ft)

Population
  - Total: 40 (2021 census)
  - Density: 0.101/km^{2} (0.26/sq mi)
- Time zone: UTC+10:00 (AEST)
- Postcode: 4702
Suburbs around Coorumbene
Rolleston	Lowesby	Humboldt
Consuelo	Coorumbene	Humboldt
Consuelo	Arcadia Valley	Arcadia Valley

Coorumbene is a rural locality in the Central Highlands Region, Queensland, Australia. In the 2021 census, Coorumbene had a population of 40 people.

== Geography ==
The Comet River enters the locality from the south (Arcadia Valley) and loosely follows the locality's western boundary before exiting to the north-west (Rolleston).

The Dawson Highway enters the locality from the east (Humbolt / Arcadia Valley) forming part of the eastern boundary. It exits to the north-west (Rolleston).

The elevation ranges from 210 to 270 metres (690 to 890 ft) above sea level. The lower elevations are near the river to the west and are predominantly used for crop growing, while and higher elevations to the east and predominantly used for grazing on native vegetation and planted pastures.

== Demographics ==
In the 2016 census, Coorumbene had a population of 8 people.

In the 2021 census, Coorumbene had a population of 40 people.

== Education ==
There are no schools in Coorumbene. The nearest government primary school is Rolleston State School in neighbouring Rolleston to the north-west. There are no nearby secondary schools. The alternatives are distance education and boarding school.
