= Togara, Queensland =

Togara
- Suburb
- Interactive map of Togara
- Coordinates: 24.0066°S 148.6905°E
- Country: Australia
- State: Queensland
- LGA: Central Highlands Region
- Location: 33.9 km (21.1 mi) S of Comet; 74.9 km (46.5 mi) SE of Emerald; 90.0 km (55.9 mi) N of Rolleston; 258 km (160 mi) W of Rockhampton; 780 km (480 mi) NW of Brisbane

Government
  - State electorate: Gregory
  - Federal division: Flynn

Area
  - Total: 1,149.8 km^{2} (443.9 sq mi)

Population
  - Total: 30 (2021 census)
  - Density: 0.026/km^{2} (0.068/sq mi)
- Time zone: UTC+10:00 (AEST)
- Postcode: 4702
Suburbs around Togara
Comet	Comet	Comet
Arcturus	Togara	Stewarton
Orion	Lowesby	Humboldt

Togara is a rural locality in the Central Highlands Region, Queensland, Australia. In the 2021 census, Togara had a population of 30 people.

== Geography ==
The Comet River forms most of the western boundary of the locality.

Toprain Hill is in the south-east of the locality (24.0802°S 148.7372°E), rising to 289 metres (948 ft) above sea level.

The Blackwater railway system enters the locality from the north (Comet) and forms part of the locality's north-eastern boundary, before heading south through the locality, exiting to the south (Lowesby). The locality is served by two railway stations:

- Kenmare railway station in the north-east of the locality (23.9000°S 148.6890°E)
- Memooloo railway station in the south-east of the locality (24.0887°S 148.7212°E)

The land use is predominantly grazing on native vegetation. There is some crop growing in the west of the locality near to the Comet River. The South Blackwater coal mine is in east of the locality.

== Demographics ==
In the 2016 census, Togara had a population of 11 people.

In the 2021 census, Togara had a population of 30 people.

== Education ==
There are no schools in Togara. For students living in the north of Togara, the nearest government primary school is Comet State School in neighbouring Comet to the north-west, while for students living in the south of Togara, the nearest government primary school is Rolleston State School in Rolleston to the south. However, for students living in the centre of the locality, these two schools are likely to be too distant for a daily commute and the alternatives are distance education and boarding school. There are no nearby secondary schools; again the alternatives are distance education and boarding school.
