= Lowesby, Queensland =

Lowesby
- Suburb
- Interactive map of Lowesby
- Coordinates: 24.3397°S 148.6844°E
- Country: Australia
- State: Queensland
- LGA: Central Highlands Region
- Location: 15.5 km (9.6 mi) NE of Rolleston; 86.3 km (53.6 mi) SE of Springsure; 155 km (96 mi) SSE of Emerald; 301 km (187 mi) WSW of Rockhampton; 706 km (439 mi) NW of Brisbane

Government
  - State electorate: Gregory
  - Federal division: Flynn

Area
  - Total: 379.7 km^{2} (146.6 sq mi)

Population
  - Total: 21 (2021 census)
  - Density: 0.0553/km^{2} (0.143/sq mi)
- Time zone: UTC+10:00 (AEST)
- Postcode: 4702
Suburbs around Lowesby
Orion	Togara	Humboldt
Albinia	Lowesby	Humboldt
Rolleston	Coorumbene	Coorumbene

Lowesby is a rural locality in the Central Highlands Region, Queensland, Australia. In the 2021 census, Lowesby had a population of 21 people.

== Geography ==
The Comet River enters the locality from the south-east (Rolleston), then forms the western boundary of the locality, before exiting to the north-west (Orion / Togara).

The Blackwater Rolleston Road enters the locality from the north-east (Humboldt) and exits to the south-west (Rolleston). The Blackwater railway line enters the locality from the north (Togara) and exits to the north-west (Orion); there are no railway stations within the locality.

The land use is predominantly grazing on native vegetation with some crop-growing.

== History ==
The Lowesby pastoral station is visible on a 1861 map.

== Demographics ==
In the 2016 census, Lowesby had a population of 11 people.

In the 2021 census, Lowesby had a population of 21 people.

== Education ==
There are no schools in Lowesby. The nearest government primary school is Rolleston State School in neighbouring Rolleston to the south-west. There are no nearby secondary schools; the alternatives are distance education and boarding school.
