= Wealwandangie, Queensland =

Wealwandangie
- Suburb
- Interactive map of Wealwandangie
- Coordinates: 24.4919°S 148.0208°E
- Country: Australia
- State: Queensland
- LGA: Central Highlands Region
- Location: 47.2 km (29.3 mi) SSW of Springsure; 115 km (71 mi) SSW of Emerald; 402 km (250 mi) WSW of Rockhampton; 797 km (495 mi) NW of Brisbane

Government
  - State electorate: Gregory
  - Federal division: Flynn

Area
  - Total: 1,049.3 km^{2} (405.1 sq mi)

Population
  - Total: 39 (2021 census)
  - Density: 0.0372/km^{2} (0.0963/sq mi)
- Time zone: UTC+10:00 (AEST)
- Postcode: 4722
Suburbs around Wealwandangie
Cona Creek	Cairdbeign	Cairdbeign
Buckland	Wealwandangie	Albinia
Buckland	Carnarvon Park	Consuelo

Wealwandangie is a rural locality in the Central Highlands Region, Queensland, Australia. In the 2021 census, Wealwandangie had a population of 39 people.

== Geography ==
Wealwandangie has the following mountains (from north to south):

- Mount Catherine (24.4081°S 148.1682°E) 621 metres (2,037 ft)
- Pine Mountain (24.4168°S 148.1347°E) 572 metres (1,877 ft)
- Dingo Hill (24.4267°S 148.1602°E) 536 metres (1,759 ft)
- Mount Sterculia (24.4267°S 147.8768°E) 571 metres (1,873 ft)
- Mount Aldeberan (24.5339°S 148.1684°E) 736 metres (2,415 ft)

The land use is predominantly grazing on native vegetation with a small amount of crop growing near the centre of the locality.

== Demographics ==
In the 2016 census, Wealwandangie had a population of 37 people.

In the 2021 census, Wealwandangie had a population of 39 people.

== Education ==
There are no schools in Wealwandangie. The nearest government school is Springsure State School (Prep to Year 10) in Springsure to the north. There is also a Catholic primary school in Springsurd. However, students in the west of the locality would be too distant from these schools. Also, there is no school providing education to Year 12 nearby. The alternatives are distance education and boarding school.
