= YSPI =

YSPI may refer to:

- Springsure Airport
- Acyl-homoserine-lactone synthase, an enzyme
