= Albinia, Queensland =

Albinia
- Suburb
- Interactive map of Albinia
- Coordinates: 24.445°S 148.3925°E
- Country: Australia
- State: Queensland
- LGA: Central Highlands Region
- Location: 21.5 km (13.4 mi) NW of Rolleston; 49.3 km (30.6 mi) SE of Springsure; 118 km (73 mi) SSE of Emerald; 319 km (198 mi) WSW of Rockhampton; 714 km (444 mi) NW of Brisbane

Government
  - State electorate: Gregory
  - Federal division: Flynn

Area
  - Total: 1,067.4 km^{2} (412.1 sq mi)

Population
  - Total: 165 (2021 census)
  - Density: 0.1546/km^{2} (0.4004/sq mi)
- Time zone: UTC+10:00 (AEST)
Suburbs around Albinia
Cairdbeign	Orion	Lowesby
Wealwandangie	Albinia	Rolleston
Consuelo	Consuelo	Consuelo

Albinia is a rural locality in the Central Highlands Region, Queensland, Australia. In the 2021 census, Albinia had a population of 165 people.

== Geography ==
The western part of the locality is mountainous with individual peaks such as Mount Hope at 596 metres (1,955 ft) and Mount Kelman at 470 metres (1,540 ft). The eastern part of the locality falls toward the east to elevations of 200 metres (660 ft). The Mount Hope State Forest is in the western part of the locality including the mountain itself.

A number of creeks flow from west to east across the locality including Albinia Creek. These creeks are tributaries of the Comet River and ultimately contribute to the Fitzroy River which flows into the Coral Sea.

The large Rolleston coal mine is operated by Glencore Coal in the centre of the locality. The mine is supported by a number of dams and other infrastructure. A branch of the Blackwater railway system provides transport for the coal.

To the east of the mine is the Albinia National Park.

The Dawson Highway passes through from east to north.

== History ==
The locality and creek are believed to derive their names from the Albinia Downs, which was named by Ludwig Leichhardt on 28 December 1844 during his overland journey from Moreton Bay to Port Essington in the Northern Territory.

== Demographics ==
In the 2016 census, Albinia had a population of 112 people.

In the 2021 census, Albinia had a population of 165 people.

== Economy ==
There are a number of homesteads in the locality:

- Albinia Downs (24.4217°S 148.4824°E)
- Bottle Tree Downs (24.5225°S 148.4815°E)
- Croydon Hills (24.3570°S 148.2898°E)
- Inderi (24.3284°S 148.4272°E)
- Meteor Downs (24.3813°S 148.3323°E)
- Meteor Downs (24.3823°S 148.3327°E)
- Meteor Park (24.4833°S 148.4132°E)
- Mount Kelman (24.4214°S 148.2818°E)
- Springwood (24.5324°S 148.3507°E)
- Starlee (24.3504°S 148.5409°E)

== Education ==
There are no schools in Albinia. The nearest government primary school is Rolleston State School in neighbouring Rolleston to the east. The nearest government schools offering secondary education is Springsure State School (to Year 10) in Springsure to the north-west. For secondary education to Year 12, the options are distance education and boarding school.
