= Old Rainworth Stone Store =

Historic site in Queensland

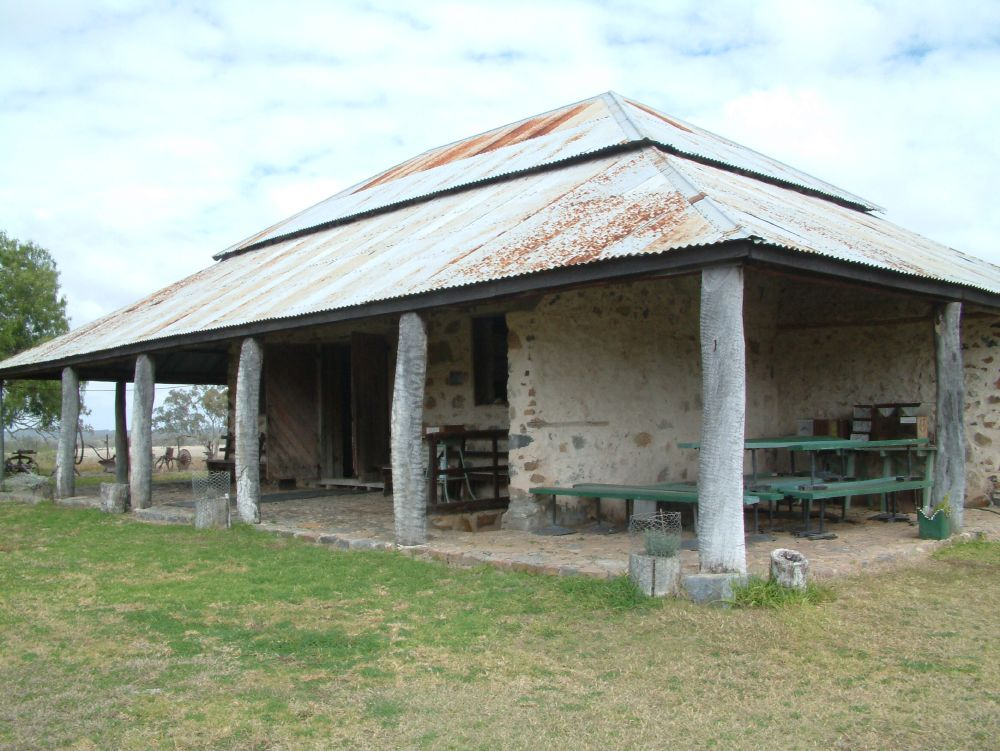
- Old Rainworth Stone Store, 2005

- Location within Queensland Location within Australia
- 24.1962°S 148.0722°E
- Location: Wealwandangie Road, Cairdbeign, Central Highlands Region, Queensland, Australia

History
- Design period: 1840s–1860s (mid-19th century)
- Built: 1862

Site notes
- Website: www.queensland.com/au/en/things-to-do/attractions/p-56b2662a7b935fbe730e5233-old-rainworth-fort

Queensland Heritage Register
- Official name: Old Rainworth Stone Store, Old Rainworth Fort, Rainworth Head Station Store
- Type: state heritage (archaeological, built)
- Designated: 21 October 1992
- Reference no.: 600026
- Significant period: 1860s (historical); 1860s (fabric)
- Significant components: store/s / storeroom / storehouse, cellar
- Builders: George Goldring

Old Rainworth Stone Store is a heritage-listed storehouse and now museum at Wealwandangie Road, Cairdbeign, 10 kilometres (6.2 mi) south of the town of Springsure, Central Highlands Region, Queensland, Australia. It was built in 1862 by George Goldring. It is also known as Old Rainworth Fort and Rainworth Head Station Store. It was added to the Queensland Heritage Register on 21 October 1992.

== History ==
The Rainworth store is a single-storeyed, rectangular stone structure built in 1862 for Jesse Gregson as a storehouse on the 100,000-acre (40,000 ha) Rainworth Station in the Diamantina district of Queensland. It was built adjacent to Rainworth Creek, close to the boundary of Rainworth and Cairdbeign and is now part of the Old Rainworth Fort Tourist Complex on Wealwandangie Road, about 8 kilometres (5.0 mi) from Springsure.

In 1844 Ludwig Leichhardt explored an area to the east of what is now the township of Springsure, naming the Expedition Range, Albinia Downs and Comet Creek. In 1846 Major Thomas Mitchell travelled through the area and in 1847 Leichhardt attempted to explore the area again, but was forced back by floodwaters.

While the Leichhardt Pastoral District was officially opened to settlement on 10 January 1854, it was only after William Landsborough explored the Springsure area in 1858 that pastoralists began to take up runs in the vicinity.

Following a reconnaissance into the Leichhardt Pastoral District in late 1860 by Queensland's Surveyor-General Augustus Charles Gregory and William Kellman, the flat-topped hill south of present-day Springsure was named Rainworth Hill. Gregory subsequently took up a number of leases in the district, paying the rent on Wallaroo, Norwood, Emu Plains, Osmondthorpe and Yarra No.2 in March 1861. Gregory did not hold these leases for long, and in September 1862 the rents were paid by lessees Jesse Gregson and Alexander and William Busby, who called the combined runs Rainworth Station.

While travelling out to Sydney from England in the mid-1850s, one of Jesse Gregson's fellow passengers was Alexander Busby, who invited Gregson to visit him at Llangollen Station near Cassilis. Failing to find work in Sydney, Gregson took up Busby's offer and soon gained employment at Collaroy, a nearby property, where he learnt stock management and was appointed head overseer by 1858. In May 1860, as Busby's partner, he overlanded 5,000 sheep to a new station in Queensland, which he named Rainworth, near the future town of Springsure. By June 1861 Jesse Gregson was living on the property as manager and was in partnership with Alex and William Busby as lessees. Gregson described the run in his diaries:

I made my head station and called it Rainworth after the hill on the opposite side of the creek. It was a lovely tract of open country. A little creek fed by a stream flowed southerly to join Cona Creek. There was sparse timber, a stunted Downs box in patches all around, which without diminishing the open character of the country added to its beauty. Down the valley were clumps of tea tree scrub here and there. Opposite was the strikingly picturesque hill which Gregory had named Rainworth and which some seven or eight hundred feet above the level of the adjacent country. Behind our camp was another isolate hill called Mt Cassilis, the distance between the two hills being perhaps one and a half miles.

Rainworth Head Station was established on the Norwood East run, just north of the boundary with Cairdbeign Station and west/northwest of Rainworth Hill. At that time the Cairdbeign-Wealandangie Road to Springsure passed through the property, and the head station was established near where this road crossed Rainworth Creek. The first head station buildings were constructed of timber. On 17 October 1861, a few months after Gregson had taken up occupancy at Rainworth, the local Kari people attacked the nearby pastoral property of Cullin-la-ringo. In the Cullin-la-ringo attack 19 people, including women and children, were killed. Of the 22 people on Cullin-la-Ringo that day three survived: a station hand and two shepherds. Edward Kenny, one of the surviving shepherds, rode to Jesse Gregson at Rainworth to raise the alarm and to seek help. Within days the former owner of Cullin-la-ringo, PE MacDonald, accompanied by a troop of Native Mounted Police, led reprisal attacks against the Kari people.

Construction began on a stone store at Rainworth in 1862, following the Cullin-la-ringo massacre. The store was built out of stone in order to reduce threats of fire and to act as a safe haven during an Aboriginal raid. The builder was an Englishman, George Goldring, who with his son had arrived at Rainworth in 1862, and was employed initially as a bookkeeper. He left Rainworth in 1868.

To construct the store, Goldring burned lime, made bricks and collected basalt boulders. He bound the walls with a mortar mix of sand, lime and a holding element obtained from crushing calcified basalt. It is believed that the roof was clad with galvanised iron, which was amongst the earliest use of this material in the district. The Rainworth Store is the only known stone building erected by Golding in Queensland.

By 1867 Gregson had established the necessary plant and buildings at Rainworth. In that year he entered into a new seven-year partnership with the Busbys and commenced fencing 20,000 acres (8,100 ha) of Rainworth land using wire, which he claimed was the first use of wire fencing in the district.

Jesse Gregson contributed significantly to the development of the Springsure district. He served as postmaster for the district until January 1864, when a post office was opened at the town of Springsure, surveyed in 1863. He was a member of the Springsure Road Trust, praised in 1864 by the Engineer of Roads in the Northern District, Frederick Byerley, for completing the work on their section of the Rockhampton to Springsure road within cost. At Cairdbeign on 4 January 1865, a meeting of prominent landholders Archibald Buchanan, Robert Patton, William Thomson, Peter McIntosh and Jesse Gregson decided to form a local agricultural society to improve the quality of livestock. Gregson was the inaugural Secretary of the Society.

In 1874 Alexander Busby, who was on the board of the Australian Agricultural Company, one of the largest pastoral and mining companies in Australia, recommended Gregson for the position of Company Superintendent. Gregson left Rainworth to take up this position, which he held from 1875 to 1905.

After the Gregson family left Rainworth in 1874, the property was offered for sale but there were no buyers and James Nesbit was appointed the manager. From 1862 the partners had held a mortgage with The Commercial Banking Company of Sydney and the lease was transferred to the Bank on 1 June 1877.

Government land policy at this period encouraged the resumption of large pastoral leaseholds for closer subdivision, but existing lessees could apply for pre-emptive selection as freehold, to protect improvements such as head station homesteads and shearing sheds. In November 1877 the Rainworth Head Station blocks, on Portions 1 and 1A, parish of Rainworth, county of Denison, were surveyed as pre-emptive selections. At this time improvements on portion 1A, which contained the head station buildings, totalled £2,836/15/- and comprised a ten-roomed house of wood/weatherboard and shingles ('W & S'), valued at £750; a kitchen building with bath and saddle rooms, valued at £250; a stone store with cellars, granaries, meat rooms and dairy, valued at £1200; a number of slab and iron huts valued at £100; yards and 1 mile (1.6 km) of 2 and 3 rail fencing, valued at £130; a water race and garden valued at £250; and 4.75 miles (7.64 km) of 6 wire fencing valued at £156/15/-. The property was still operating as a sheep station, with lamb folds established close to the head station buildings.

Deeds of grant for portion 1A (containing the head station buildings) and portion 1 were issued to the Commercial Banking Company of Sydney in September 1878 and April 1880 respectively. In May 1888 title was transferred to Francis Hamilton Beadon Turner, who also acquired the lease of the consolidated Rainworth holding. It appears that until 1919 the lessees of Rainworth Station also owned the freehold of the Rainworth Head Station.

Title to the head station freehold passed to Dalgety & Company in 1904, then to Francis Bayntun Starky (grazier of Sydney) and Prosper Charles Trebeck (Stock & Station Agent of Sydney) in 1912.

Alexander McLaughlin (grazier of Burnside near Springsure) acquired the Rainworth Head Station freehold in 1919, and the property has been owned by his descendants ever since. It appears that from this time the freehold was known as Old Rainworth.

In 1940 Alexander McLaughlin divided his holdings amongst his children. Two of his granddaughters inherited Burnside and in 1973 purchased Old Rainworth. The McLaughlin sisters, concerned about the deterioration of the old stone store and wanting to restore and conserve its heritage, established a Committee for the Preservation of Old Rainworth Fort. Stonemason Gino Sandrin was employed in 1981 to restore the building. He used original stones that he shaped, using cement to help hold them in place.

In April 1980 the National Trust Journal described the Old Rainworth Stone Store. Constructed of local material, the bluestone walls were held together with a mortar of clay and the external walls with a mix of clay and limestone. It was single-storeyed with a loft and a cellar. The building appeared to have been constructed in two stages, the inner rectangular section first with the surrounding outer walls added later. It was rectangular in plan with a perimeter verandah. Originally the shorter sides of the rectangle were stone, however, weathering had caused these external walls to collapse. Windows and doors were timber framed and suspended floors were of cypress with massive log bearers. A timber framed calico partition created a main room. The stone store measured approximately 17 by 14 metres (56 by 46 ft) with the stone walls about 300 to 400 millimetres (12 to 16 in) in thickness. The roof was corrugated iron.

In 1987 the Old Cairdbeign homestead, constructed in the 1870s, was demolished and re-erected at Old Rainworth, which was being developed as an historical tourist complex. Springsure timber worker Robert Young re-built the homestead between 18 July and 31 October 1987.

Archibald Buchanan was the first owner of Cairdbeign and his was the first homestead built on Rainworth Creek. By 1881 the head station had been moved about 20 kilometres (12 mi) southeast of Rainworth and a new large slab house of seven rooms erected, using some timber from a barn at the former head station on the creek. Some of these slabs with joggles cut for holding benches can still be seen in the old Cairdbeign homestead at the Rainworth historical tourist complex. The former Cairdbeign School also has been relocated to Old Rainworth.

Old Rainworth now functions as a tourist facility and has a special association for tourists and visiting school children.

== Museum ==
The museum complex contains the storehouse in its original condition, the relocated Cairdbeign homestead and the original school building from the 1800s. The museum contains many period pieces and artefacts of local importance. According to the current caretakers of the fort, Colleen McLaughlin and her sister Lorna Smith, the future of the historic site is unsure:

"The most common comment that we have in our (visitors) book is the preservation of the history in this district," Ms McLaughlin said.

"This is not just a stone building in the backyard of Springsure. There is nothing like it anywhere else anywhere in Australia

"We have people who have signed it, saying this is an icon this must be preserved.

"The future's the $64,000 question... the whole area is national heritage and I just hope somewhere along the line a trust will be formed."

== Description ==
The Old Rainworth Stone Store is located on Burnside approximately 10 kilometres (6.2 mi) by road from Springsure. It is accessed by travelling south along the Dawson Highway towards Rolleston for approximately 8 kilometres (5.0 mi) then taking the Wealwandangie Road for a further 2 kilometres (1.2 mi).

The Old Rainworth Stone Store has undergone partial reconstruction. It is a single-storey structure with a corrugated iron broken hipped roof with a U-shaped verandah encircling the entire western elevation and part of the southern and northern elevations. Constructed of locally quarried basalt, the stones are mortared with a pise of calcified basalt that comes from beneath the black soils of the district The building contains six rooms, a cellar and a loft. The unlined walls vary in thickness from 35 to 45 centimetres (14 to 18 in).

The main room on the western side of the building is accessed through double timber doors made of diagonal boards, and which have original fittings. The main room has a timber floor and windows. The timber frame of an interior partition wall with a connecting doorway remains. From the main room a set of timber stairs lead to the loft. The treads are narrow (13 centimetres (5.1 in)) and there are no risers. A recent handrail of debarked bush timber has been installed for safety purposes. The loft has a timber floor.

The encircling verandah has stone flooring and a set of timber stairs lead from the western side down to a cellar. The cellar walls and floor are of stone and several vents are set into the walls.

The eastern section of the building comprises three rooms. The walls and flooring of each of the end rooms are of stone while the centre room has an earthen floor with an exterior wall of horizontal slab timbers.

To the south west of the building are the remains of what appears to have been an arbor; this is constructed of debarked bush timbers. Immediately to the west of this is the site of the former Rainworth Homestead. No surface remains are apparent.

== Heritage listing ==
Old Rainworth Stone Store was listed on the Queensland Heritage Register on 21 October 1992 having satisfied the following criteria. Neither Cairdbeign Homestead nor the Cairdbeign School are considered to be of state-level cultural heritage significance.

The place is important in demonstrating the evolution or pattern of Queensland's history.

The Old Rainworth Stone Store illustrates the pattern of early non-indigenous settlement in Queensland, where the development of pastoral properties preceded agriculture and the establishment of towns. Because of the distance of Rainworth Station from a major settlement, lessee Jesse Gregson had the stone building erected in 1862 to store and protect supplies brought twice a year from Rockhampton. Its construction illustrates the need on pastoral properties for the provision of adequate storage facilities in harsh climatic conditions remote from the source of supply.

The place demonstrates rare, uncommon or endangered aspects of Queensland's cultural heritage.

The Rainworth Stone Store is a rare surviving mid-19th century stone building constructed for the purpose of storing provisions for lengthy periods. In addition, comparatively few stores on pastoral properties were constructed in stone in Queensland at this period.

The place has potential to yield information that will contribute to an understanding of Queensland's history.

The Rainworth Stone Store is a rare surviving mid-19th century stone structure in Queensland, which has the potential, through physical investigation and documentary research, to reveal important information about the design, form and function of stone buildings of this period, way of life on a pastoral property in a remote area, and about the people who erected such buildings. Archaeological deposits associated with the former homestead have the potential to contribute information on the lifeways of an operative pastoral property of the late 19th century and throughout the 20th century.

The place is important in demonstrating the principal characteristics of a particular class of cultural places.

The Rainworth Stone Store remains substantially intact and is important in illustrating the principal characteristics of a fortified store on a remote and early pastoral property. These characteristics include the use of traditional European building techniques combined with local materials with inherent insulation qualities.

The place has a strong or special association with a particular community or cultural group for social, cultural or spiritual reasons.

Rainworth Stone Store is an asset valued by the community as one of the earliest surviving buildings in the area and for its connections with the past. Forming part of a tourist attraction, Rainworth Stone Store is recognised as a significant part of the history of the district.
