= Lucy Eatock =

Australian political activist

Lucy Harriet Eatock
- Born: 7 June 1874; Springsure
- Died: 12 February 1950 (aged 75)
- Political party: Communist Party of Australia
- Spouse: William Eatock

Lucy Harriet Eatock (née Lucy Wakenshaw; 7 June 1874 – 12 February 1950) was an Australian political activist with the Communist Party of Australia (CPA). She married an Aboriginal man named William Eatock and had nine children. She and her children participated in demonstrations and faced discrimination from authorities.

== Life ==
Eatock was born in the Central Highlands of Queensland in a town named Springsure. Her Scottish-born parents were said to be Jane Lindsay (née Cousins) and her husband, Alexander Wakenshaw. She was their ninth child. Some sources have questioned whether her dark skin colour suggests that she may have had other parents. Her father, in time, became a pastoralist. On 18 November 1895, when she was 21 and still living in Springsure, she married an Aboriginal man named William Eatock, who was a stockman.

In 1908, they were in New South Wales where her husband was working in an abattoir. They had nine children and they lived in makeshift huts or tents near Brewarrina, where life was difficult for the family. They agreed to separate, and William took two of their sons, while Lucy took the youngest children and an elder daughter. Lucy could only find work as a domestic worker, and she fostered the children out to a number of places, including the town of Bowral.

In the 1920s she was living with her daughter and four of her sons, who were all employed and active members of the Communist Party of Australia (CPA). Lucy, who attended the demonstrations in smart clothes, and her family, along with the CPA, were frequently in dispute with the authorities. In 1932, she was assaulted by a police officer who was trying to keep order in the unemployed demonstrators in Glebe on 27 October. Her sons appeared in court for offences arising from demonstrating, and one of her sons, Noel, was at the centre of an incident that attracted wide support.

Noel and another man were arrested following a demonstration at which a police officer had been hurt. Noel had witnesses who affirmed that he was not at the demonstration, but despite this he received the most severe sentence of two and half years. The man who had been arrested with Noel, and who some saw as a stronger suspect, was a former soldier and he was released. Non-aboriginal demonstrators were generally given sentences of three months but aboriginal people were given much longer sentences. Lucy was annoyed that the CPA had not done more to look after their members and that Noel, especially, had been badly treated. The family left the CPA. Noel did not renew contact with his mother after he completed his sentence.

Lucy died in 1950, survived by five of her children. Her son, Lindsay, remained in politics but the rest of the family retired. Lucy's grandchildren became proud of their Indigenous Australian ancestry and some argued that Lucy had indigenous ancestry, but Lucy herself never claimed this.

Lucy's house in Glebe was nominated for a blue plaque to celebrate her life there.
