= Orion, Queensland =

Orion
- Suburb
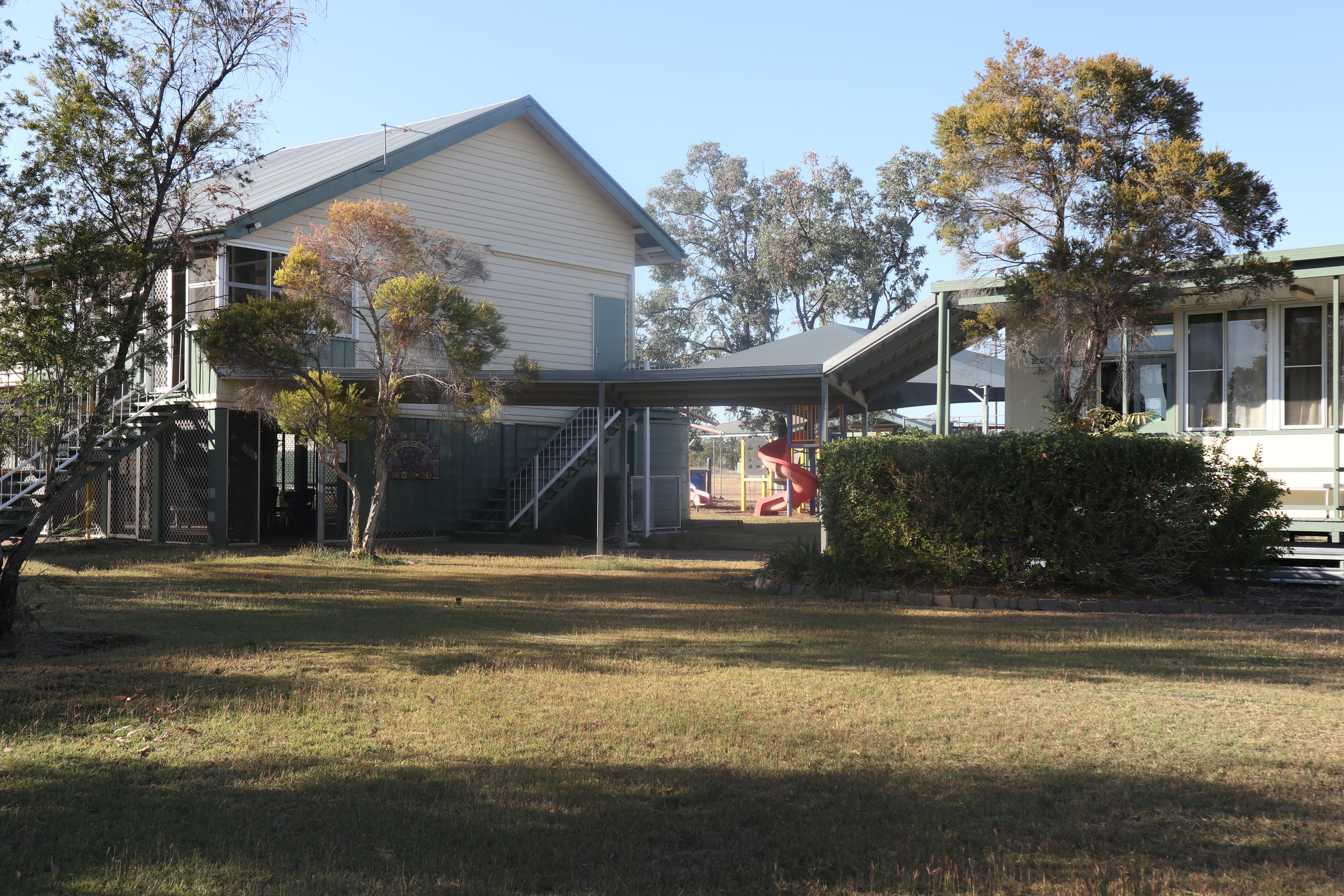
- Orion State School, 2023

- Interactive map of Orion
- Coordinates: 24.2086°S 148.3630°E
- Country: Australia
- State: Queensland
- LGA: Central Highlands Region
- Location: 46.4 km (28.8 mi) SE of Springsure; 115 km (71 mi) S of Emerald; 320 km (200 mi) WSW of Rockhampton; 738 km (459 mi) NW of Brisbane

Government
  - State electorate: Gregory
  - Federal division: Flynn

Area
  - Total: 766.8 km^{2} (296.1 sq mi)

Population
  - Total: 87 (2021 census)
  - Density: 0.1135/km^{2} (0.2939/sq mi)
- Time zone: UTC+10:00 (AEST)
- Postcode: 4722
Suburbs around Orion
Springsure	Arcturus	Togara
Cairdbeign	Orion	Lowesby
Cairdbeign	Albinia	Lowesby

Orion is a rural locality in the Central Highlands Region, Queensland, Australia. In the 2021 census, Orion had a population of 87 people.

== Geography ==
The Comet River forms the south-eastern boundary of the locality.

The Dawson Highway enters the locality from the south (Albinia), passes through the south-west of the locality, and exits to the west (Cairdbeign). The Blackwater railway line enters the locality from the south-east (Lowesby), passes briefly through the south-east of the locality before exiting to the south (Albinia).

The eastern and central parts of the locality are about 200 metres about sea level, while the western part of the locality is more mountainous, rising to unnamed peaks of 600 metres. There are two named peaks in the locality:

- Mount Sirius (24.2326°S 148.2126°E) 532 metres (1,745 ft)
- Terrace Hill (24.2108°S 148.2665°E) 467 metres (1,532 ft)

The Cairdbeign State Forest is in the west of the locality. Predominant land uses elsewhere in the locality are grazing on native vegetation, mostly in the west and east, and the growing of grain, mostly in the north and south.

== History ==
Orion State School opened on 28 January 1964. The school celebrated its 50th anniversary in 2014.

== Demographics ==
In the 2016 census, Orion had a population of 87 people.

In the 2021 census, Orion had a population of 87 people, as in 2016.

== Education ==
Orion State School is a government primary (Prep-6) school for boys and girls at 1002 Ten Chain Road (24.2303°S 148.4107°E). In 2016, the school had an enrolment of 16 students with 1 teacher and 4 non-teaching staff (2 full-time equivalent). In 2018, the school had an enrolment of 11 students with 2 teachers (1 full-time equivalent) and 5 non-teaching staff (2 full-time equivalent). In 2022, enrolment had fallen to 3 students.

There are no secondary schools in Orion. The nearest government secondary school is Springsure State School (to Year 10) in neighbouring Springsure to the north-west; however, due to distances, some parts of the locality would be too distant for daily travel. There are no schools providing secondary education to Year 12 nearby. Other options are distance education and boarding school.

== Amenities ==
Orion Community Hall is at 1002 Orion Ten Chain Road, immediately south of the school.(24.23137°S 148.41060°E)
