= Arcturus, Queensland =

Arcturus
- Suburb
- Interactive map of Arcturus
- Coordinates: 23.9772°S 148.3216°E
- Country: Australia
- State: Queensland
- LGA: Central Highlands Region
- Location: 50.9 km (31.6 mi) NE of Springsure; 68.0 km (42.3 mi) SSE of Emerald; 268 km (167 mi) W of Rockhampton; 801 km (498 mi) NNW of Brisbane

Government
  - State electorate: Gregory
  - Federal division: Flynn

Area
  - Total: 1,206.1 km^{2} (465.7 sq mi)

Population
  - Total: 130 (2021 census)
  - Density: 0.108/km^{2} (0.279/sq mi)
- Time zone: UTC+10:00 (AEST)
- Postcode: 4702
Suburbs around Arcturus
Gindie	Gindie	Comet
Minerva	Arcturus	Togara
Springsure	Orion	Orion

Arcturus is a rural locality in the Central Highlands Region, Queensland, Australia. In the 2021 census, Arcturus had a population of 130 people.

== Geography ==
The land use in Arcturus is a mixture of cropping and grazing on native vegetation.

== Demographics ==
At the 2016 census, Arcturus had a population of 75 people.

In the 2021 census, Arcturus had a population of 130 people.

== Economy ==
There are a number of homesteads in the locality:

- Adelong (23.8383°S 148.4534°E)
- Arcturus Downs (24.0348°S 148.4085°E)
- Bambar (24.0598°S 148.4359°E)
- Boongulla (23.9679°S 148.3283°E)
- Cowley (23.9799°S 148.3550°E)
- Crystal Plains (23.9571°S 148.1604°E)
- Den-Lo-Park (23.9465°S 148.3672°E)
- Erskinville (24.0650°S 148.1695°E)
- Goonoo (23.8111°S 148.4701°E)
- Kelso (24.0543°S 148.3108°E)
- Kilmore (23.8456°S 148.3958°E)
- Koala Creek (24.0330°S 148.3349°E)
- Kolane (23.8722°S 148.3970°E)
- Milroy Downs (23.9074°S 148.2254°E)
- Moorooloo (24.1194°S 148.2620°E)
- Mostyndale (24.0200°S 148.1651°E)
- Oasis (23.8924°S 148.4081°E)
- Pengarra (23.9368°S 148.2808°E)
- Pinnacle (24.0495°S 148.2486°E)
- Shalimar (23.9170°S 148.2664°E)
- Springton (23.9378°S 148.3757°E)
- Tarana (24.0903°S 148.4297°E)
- Turkey Creek (23.8556°S 148.3332°E)
- Wallalee (24.0109°S 148.2661°E)
- Willoughby (24.0292°S 148.4494°E)
- Wyntoon (23.8771°S 148.3110°E)

== Education ==
There are no schools in Arcturus. The nearest government primary schools are Springsure State School in neighbouring Springsure to the south-west, Gindie State School in neighbouring Gindie to the north, and Orion State School in neighbouring Orion to the south. The nearest government secondary school is Springsure State School (to Year 10). The nearest government secondary school to Year 12 is Emerald State High School in Emerald to the north, but it would be too distant for a daily commute from most parts of Arcturus; the other options would be distance education and boarding school.
