= Minerva, Queensland =

Minerva
- Suburb
- Interactive map of Minerva
- Coordinates: 23.9808°S 147.9491°E
- Country: Australia
- State: Queensland
- LGA: Central Highlands Region
- Location: 36.0 km (22.4 mi) NNW of Springsure; 71.3 km (44.3 mi) SSW of Emerald; 338 km (210 mi) WSW of Rockhampton; 799 km (496 mi) NW of Brisbane

Government
  - State electorate: Gregory
  - Federal division: Flynn

Area
  - Total: 935.7 km^{2} (361.3 sq mi)

Population
  - Total: 55 (2021 census)
  - Density: 0.0588/km^{2} (0.1522/sq mi)
- Time zone: UTC+10:00 (AEST)
- Postcode: 4722
Suburbs around Minerva
Lochington	Gindie	Gindie
Lochington	Minerva	Arcturus
Lochington	Cona Creek	Springsure

Minerva is a rural locality in the Central Highlands Region, Queensland, Australia. In the 2021 census, Minerva had a population of 55 people.

== Geography ==
The Nogoa River forms the western boundary of the locality. The terrain is mountainous with many named peaks, including:

- Bimbenang Peak (24.0410°S 147.9314°E) 466 metres (1,529 ft)
- Birdcage (24.0079°S 148.0735°E)
- Crystal Hill (23.9675°S 148.1346°E) 343 metres (1,125 ft)
- Funnel Mountain (23.9569°S 148.0158°E) 525 metres (1,722 ft)
- Little St Peter (23.9651°S 148.0250°E) 510 metres (1,670 ft)
- Mount Alexander (23.9780°S 148.0240°E) 601 metres (1,972 ft)
- Mount Cullender (23.9611°S 147.9840°E) 511 metres (1,677 ft)
- Mount Ebenezer (24.0431°S 147.9950°E) 553 metres (1,814 ft)
- Mount Elizabeth (23.9310°S 147.9696°E) 507 metres (1,663 ft)
- Mount Helmet (23.9228°S 147.9791°E) 442 metres (1,450 ft)
- Mount Horatio (23.9601°S 147.9397°E) 511 metres (1,677 ft)
- Mount Minerva (23.9406°S 148.1071°E) 311 metres (1,020 ft)
- Mount Promenade (23.9159°S 148.0074°E) 510 metres (1,670 ft)
- Mount Spencer (23.9696°S 147.9590°E) 530 metres (1,740 ft)
- Mount Wallaroo (23.9854°S 147.8945°E) 504 metres (1,654 ft)
- Mount Wandoo (23.9178°S 147.7860°E) 363 metres (1,191 ft)
- Mount Wills (23.9946°S 147.9180°E) 510 metres (1,670 ft)
- Red Hill (24.0040°S 148.1087°E) 413 metres (1,355 ft)
- Spring Hill (23.8765°S 147.9902°E) 353 metres (1,158 ft)
- St Peter (24.0073°S 148.0433°E) 494 metres (1,621 ft)
- Summer Hill (23.8639°S 147.9648°E) 357 metres (1,171 ft)
- Sunrise Hill (23.8698°S 148.0260°E) 305 metres (1,001 ft)

== History ==
Minerva Provisional School opened on 8 November 1904 with Miss Elsie Hyde the first teacher. By June 1905, there were 31 students enrolled. On 1 January 1909, it became Minerva State School. It closed on 31 December 1928 due to low student numbers and no suitable accommodation for the teacher. In 1933, the school building was rented out and then in 1938 sold by auction for £39 and then relocated to Emerald. It was on a 5-acre (2.0 ha) site that was formerly part of the Minerva Creek company reserve.

The Springsure branch railway line opened on 15 August 1887, with the locality being served by two railway stations:

- Wurba Junction railway station (23.9150°S 148.1180°E)
- Minerva railway station (23.9242°S 148.1061°E)

The section beyond Wurba Junction railway station to Springsure railway station was closed on 26 June 2013.

On 17 April 2020, the Queensland Government re-drew the boundaries of localities within the Central Highlands Region by replacing the locality of The Gemfields with three new localities of Rubyvale, Sapphire Central and Anakie Siding (around the towns of Rubyvale, Sapphire, and Anakie respectively). This included adjusting the boundaries of other existing localities in the Region to accommodate these changes; Minerva gained a small area from the north-eastern edge of Lochington, reducing the area of the locality from 935.7 to 934.4 square kilometres (361.3 to 360.8 sq mi). As a consequence of these changes, the boundary between Lochington and Minerva/Gindie more closely follows the course of the Nogoa River.

== Demographics ==
In the 2016 census, Minerva had a population of 48 people.

In the 2021 census, Minerva had a population of 55 people.

== Education ==
There are no schools in Minerva. The nearest government primary schools are Springsure State School in neighbouring Springsure to the south-east, Gindie State School in neighbouring Gindie to the north-east, and Lochington State School in neighbouring Lochington to the west. The nearest government secondary schools are Springsure State School (to Year 10) and Emerald State High School (to Year 12) in Emerald to the north-east. However, students from some parts of Minerva will be too distant from these secondary schools for a daily commute; the alternatives are distance education and boarding school.
