= Theophilus Wilson =

Australian cricketer

Personal information
- Full name: Theophilus Stuart Beatty Wilson
- Born: 15 August 1870; Springsure, Queensland, Australia
- Died: 19 May 1941 (aged 70); Springsure, Queensland, Australia
- Batting: Right-handed
- Bowling: Right-arm fast

Domestic team information
- Years: Team
- 1892–1893: Oxford University
- First-class debut: 19 May 1892 Oxford University v Gentlemen of England
- Last First-class: 3 July 1893 Oxford University v Cambridge University

Career statistics
| Competition | First-class |
|---|---|
| Matches | 17 |
| Runs scored | 186 |
| Batting average | 6.41 |
| 100s/50s | 0/0 |
| Top score | 36 |
| Balls bowled | 2,244 |
| Wickets | 46 |
| Bowling average | 22.02 |
| 5 wickets in innings | 0 |
| 10 wickets in match | 0 |
| Best bowling | 4/23 |
| Catches/stumpings | 12/– |
- Source: CricketArchive, 20 November 2012

Theophilus Stuart Beatty Wilson (15 August 1870 – 19 May 1941) was an Australian cricketer who played first-class cricket for Oxford University in 1892 and 1893. A fast bowler, he took six wickets in the two University matches against Cambridge.

Wilson was initially educated at Bath College, where he played in the school's cricket team for four years, captaining the side in his final year. He continued his education at Trinity College, Oxford. At Oxford he played in a strong side captained by Lionel Palairet and including C. B. Fry. He earned his Blue—the awarding of the Oxford "colours" to sportsmen—in each of 1892 and 1893 when he played in the University match against Cambridge, and in the latter year caused some discussion when batting. Oxford required five runs to avoid the follow-on, and Wilson was at the crease with William Brain, the last two men for their side. Wisden relates that: "The two batsmen consulted together between the wickets and it was evident that the Dark Blues were going to throw away a wicket in order that their side might go in again. C. M. Wells frustrated this intention by bowling two wide balls to the boundary." Partially as a result of this, the follow on rule was adjusted for the subsequent season. In all, Wilson played 17 first-class matches, all for Oxford, and took 46 wickets at an average of 22.02. While at Oxford, he also played rugby union, representing his college. In 1898, he was chosen in a cricket team to represent Rockhampton in a match against Brisbane.

== Bibliography ==
- Bolton, Geoffrey (1962). History of the O.U.C.C. (1st ed.). Oxford: Holywell Press.
