= Ganulu =

Aboriginal Australian people

The Ganulu, also spelt Kanolu, are an Aboriginal Australian people of the state of Queensland.

== Language ==
The Kanolu have often been confused with the Gangulu (Kangulu), despite marked differences in their languages. For example, 'no' was kara for the former, gangu for the latter, and the Kanolu word for 'man' was mari, in contrast to the Gangulu word for the same, bama.

== Country ==
The Kanolu are a people of the Central Highlands Region. In Norman Tindale's calculations, their tribal lands extended over 12,000 square kilometres (4,700 sq mi). They lived around the eastern headwaters of the Comet River from Rolleston northwards at least to Blackwater and upper Mackenzie River. Their eastern frontier lay near Dingo and Duaringa.

== History of contact ==
Native memory spoke of many members of the people dying out around the 1830s, from a disease which affected the nose, (Note: E. M. Curr glosses this by a note comparing the term current among the distant Watjarri(Cheangwa) for smallpox, namely moolya errillya-rilla-ya (stone in the nose).) and some members of the group were seen to bear marks that might have indicated a smallpox epidemic.

White settlement of Kanolu lands began around 1860. At the time their population was estimated at around 500. Within a decade, by 1869, their numbers had fallen to 300, and by 1879 it was thought no more than 200 survived. Thomas Josephson claimed that this drastic demographic decline was attributable to three factors. One was the effect of venereal disease introduced by settlers; secondly, consumption, and thirdly infanticide.

== Lifestyle ==
Josephson was struck by the Kanolu's refusal to partake of pork, an introduced meat which other Aboriginal peoples were known to eat.

== Alternative names ==
- Kanoloo
- Kanalloo

== Some words ==
- wondi (tame dog)
- kagargi (wild dog)
- yaboo (father)
- kika (mother)
- koin (white man)

== Sources ==
- Josephson, Thomas (1887). "Head of the Comet River" (PDF). In Curr, Edward Micklethwaite (ed.). The Australian race: its origin, languages, customs, place of landing in Australia and the routes by which it spread itself over the continent. Vol. 3. Melbourne: J. Ferres. pp. 96–99.
- Tindale, Norman Barnett (1974). "Kanolu (QLD)". Aboriginal Tribes of Australia: Their Terrain, Environmental Controls, Distribution, Limits, and Proper Names. Australian National University Press. ISBN 978-0-708-10741-6.
