= Cona Creek, Queensland =

Cona Creek
- Suburb
- Interactive map of Cona Creek
- Coordinates: 24.2247°S 147.8886°E
- Country: Australia
- State: Queensland
- LGA: Central Highlands Region
- Location: 30.3 km (18.8 mi) SW of Springsure; 98.3 km (61.1 mi) SSW of Emerald; 365 km (227 mi) WSW of Rockhampton; 794 km (493 mi) NW of Brisbane

Government
  - State electorate: Gregory
  - Federal division: Flynn

Area
  - Total: 852.4 km^{2} (329.1 sq mi)

Population
  - Total: 57 (2021 census)
  - Density: 0.0669/km^{2} (0.1732/sq mi)
- Time zone: UTC+10:00 (AEST)
- Postcode: 4722
Suburbs around Cona Creek
Lochington	Minerva	Springsure
Nandowrie	Cona Creek	Cairdbeign
Buckland	Buckland	Wealwandangie

Cona Creek is a rural locality in the Central Highlands Region, Queensland, Australia. In the 2021 census, Cona Creek had a population of 57 people.

== Geography ==
The creek of the same name rises in Carnarvon National Park. It then flows through neighbouring Wealwandangie, entering the locality of Cona Creek from the south-east and flowing through it to exit in the north-west (Lochington/Minerva).

The Dawson Developmental Road passes through the locality from north (Minerva) to west (Nandowrie).

The Vandyke Creek Conservation Park is in the north-west of the locality. Apart from this protected area, the land use is predominantly grazing on native vegetation with some small areas of crop growing.

== History ==
The locality presumably takes its name from the creek itself. Cona is said to be an Aboriginal word meaning mud.

== Demographics ==
In the 2016 census, Cona Creek had a population of 83 people.

In the 2021 census, Cona Creek had a population of 57 people.

== Education ==
There are no schools in Cona Creek. The nearest government primary and secondary school is Springsure State School (to Year 10) in Springsure. For secondary schooling to Year 12, the nearest government school is Emerald State High School in Emerald, but it would be too distant for most students to attend; the alternatives are distance education and boarding school.
