= Cairdbeign, Queensland =

Cairdbeign
- Suburb
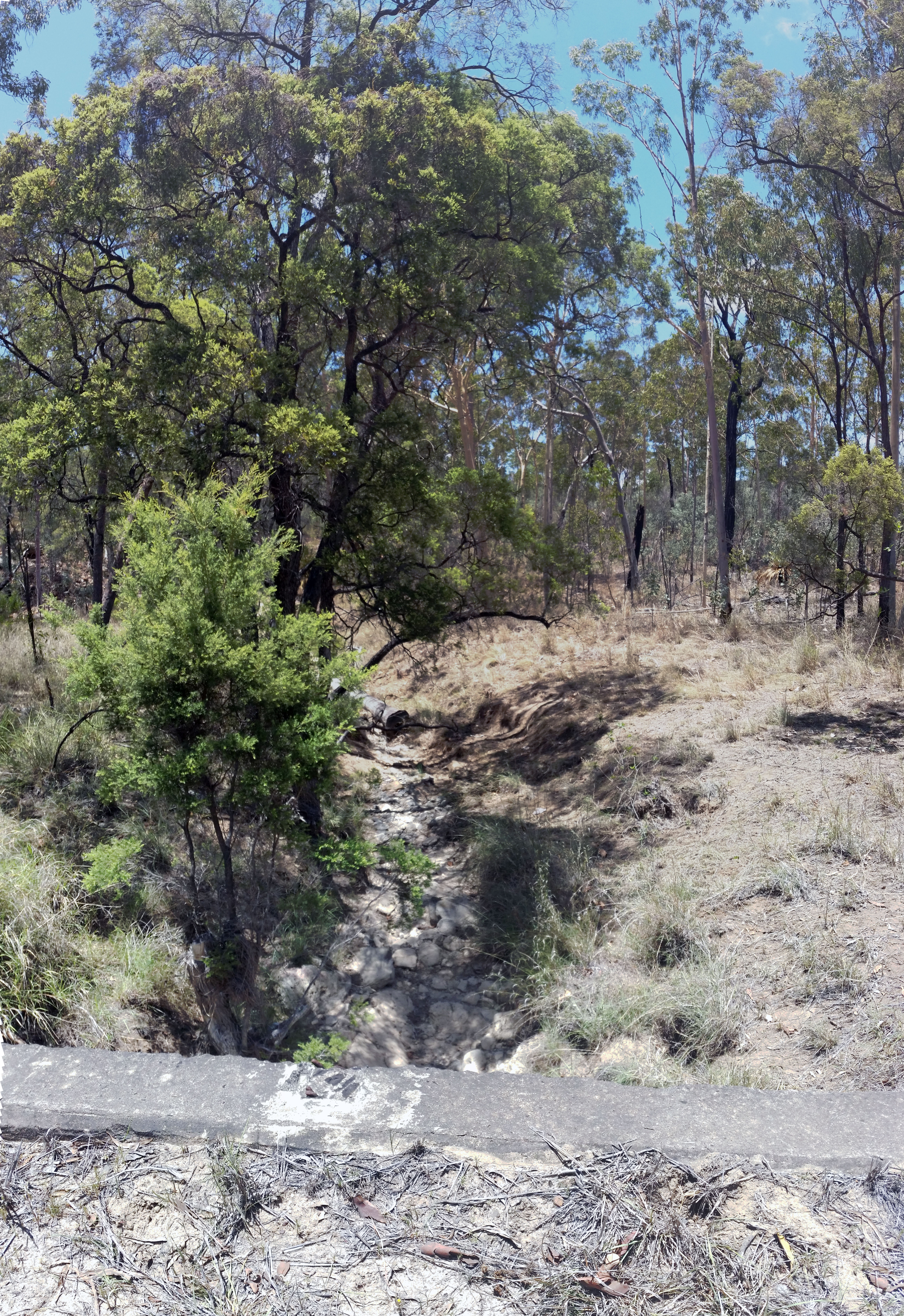
- Bridge in the bush, Cairdbeign, 2015

- Interactive map of Cairdbeign
- Coordinates: 24.2833°S 148.1397°E
- Country: Australia
- State: Queensland
- LGA: Central Highlands Region
- Location: 19.6 km (12.2 mi) SSW of Springsure; 87.9 km (54.6 mi) S of Emerald; 354 km (220 mi) SW of Rockhampton; 766 km (476 mi) NW of Brisbane

Government
  - State electorate: Gregory
  - Federal division: Flynn

Area
  - Total: 379.0 km^{2} (146.3 sq mi)

Population
  - Total: 70 (2021 census)
  - Density: 0.185/km^{2} (0.48/sq mi)
- Time zone: UTC+10:00 (AEST)
- Postcode: 4722
Suburbs around Cairdbeign
Springsure	Orion	Orion
Cona Creek	Cairdbeign	Orion
Wealwandangie	Wealwandangie	Albinia

Cairdbeign is a rural locality in the Central Highlands Region, Queensland, Australia. In the 2021 census, Cairdbeign had a population of 70 people.

== Geography ==
The Dawson Highway enters the locality from the north-east (Orion) and exists to the north-west (Springsure).

There are a number of mountains in the locality:

- Mount Cassillis at 514 metres (1,686 ft) above sea level (24.1819°S 148.0613°E)
- Mount Sirius at 532 metres (1,745 ft) above sea level (24.2344°S 148.2133°E)
- Rainworth Hill at 569 metres (1,867 ft) above sea level (24.2005°S 148.0913°E)

== History ==
Cardbeign Provisional School opened circa 1894. On 1 January 1909, it became Cardbeign State School. It closed and re-opened a number of times due to fluctuating student numbers. It closed permanently circa 1931. Note that the spelling is slightly different to the locality name. It was on Dalmally Road (24.2255°S 148.1047°E).

== Demographics ==
In the 2016 census, Cairdbeign had a population of 85 people.

In the 2021 census, Cairdbeign had a population of 70 people.

== Heritage listings ==
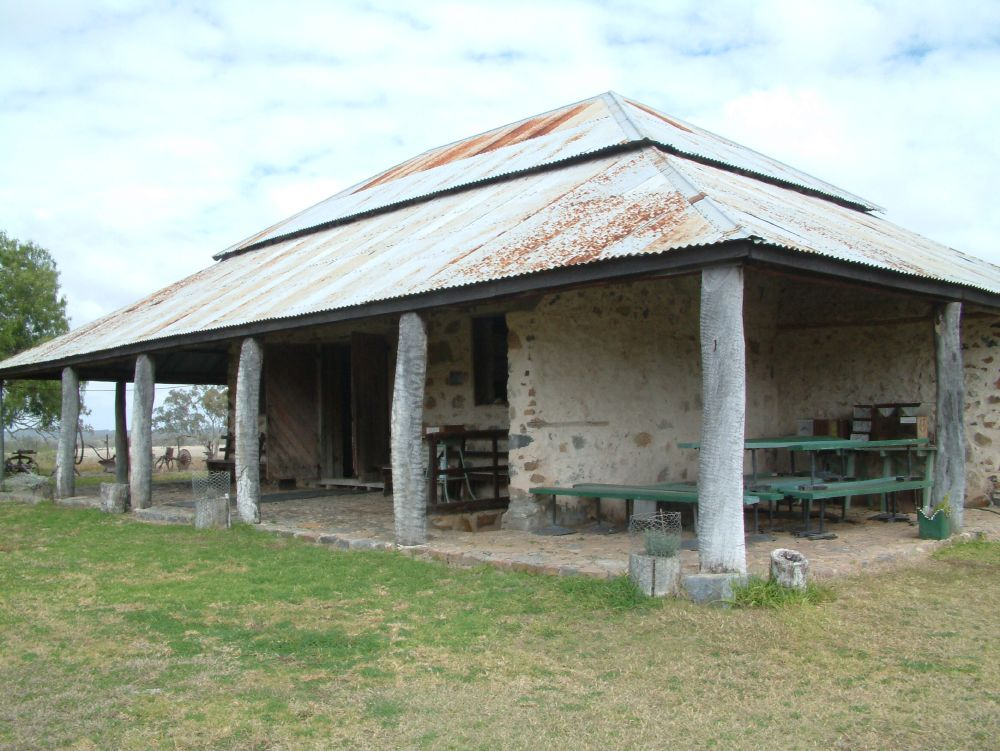
Old Rainworth Stone Store, 2005

Cairdbeign has a number of heritage-listed sites, including:

- Old Rainworth Stone Store, Wealwandangie Road (24.1962°S 148.0722°E)

== Education ==
There are no schools in Cairdbeign. The nearest government schools are Springsure State School (Prep to Year 10) in neighbouring Springsure to the north-west and Orion State School (Prep - Year 6) in neighbouring Orion to the east.

There are no schools providing secondary education to Year 12 nearby. The options are distance education and boarding school.
