= Cullin-la-ringo massacre =

1861 massacre of white settlers by Aboriginal men in Queensland

Coordinates: 24°0′S 148°05′E

Cullin-La-Ringo massacre
- Part of the Australian frontier wars
- T. G. Moyle, The Wills Tragedy, 1861, held at the State Library of Queensland.
- Location: Springsure in Central Queensland, Australia
- Date: October 17, 1861; 165 years ago
- Attack type: Massacre
- Deaths: 19
- Victims: European settlers and colonists
- Perpetrator: Aboriginal Australians

Cullin-la-ringo massacre (Australia)

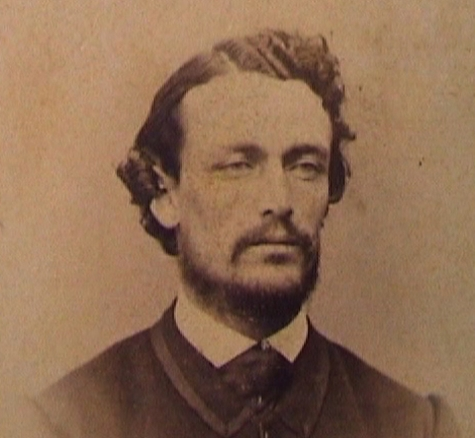
Tom Wills, cricketer and founder of Australian rules football, one of six settlers who survived the massacre

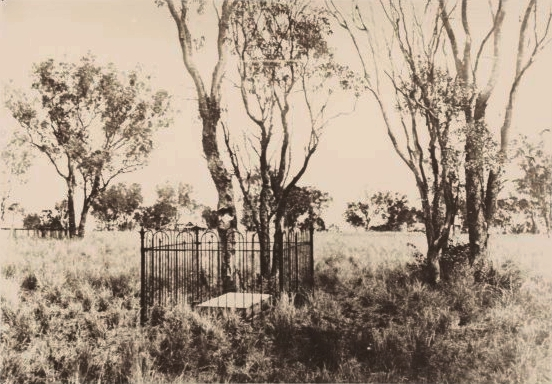
Horatio Wills' gravestone, ca. 1950

The Cullin-la-ringo massacre, also known as the Wills tragedy, was a massacre of European settlers by Indigenous Australians that occurred on 17 October 1861, north of modern-day Springsure in Central Queensland, Australia. Nineteen men, women and children were killed in the attack, including Horatio Wills, the owner of Cullin-la-ringo station. It is the single largest massacre of European settlers by Aboriginal people in Australian history.

In the weeks afterwards, police, native police and civilian posses carried out "one of the most lethal punitive expeditions in frontier history", hunting down and killing up to 370 members of the Gayiri Aboriginal people implicated in the massacre. The most recent study by the University of Newcastle Colonial Frontier Massacres experts puts the figure at 90 dead.

== Massacre ==
In mid-October 1861, a party of squatters from the colony of Victoria, under Horatio Wills, set up a temporary tent camp to start the process of establishing a cattle station at Cullin-la-ringo, a property formed by amalgamating four blocks of land with a total area of 260 square kilometres (100 mi^{2}). Wills's party, an enormous settlement train, including bullock wagons and more than 10,000 sheep, had set out from Brisbane eight months earlier. The size of the group had attracted much attention from other settlers, as well as the Indigenous people.

It was later reported that the attack on the party was as revenge for the murder of Gayiri men by Wills' neighbour, Jesse Gregson, a squatter from the nearby Rainworth Station, who had erroneously accused the Gayiri of stealing cattle. According to the account of one of the survivors, John Moore, Aboriginal people had been passing through the camp all day on 17 October 1861, building up numbers until there were at least 50. Then, without warning, they attacked the men, women, and children with nulla nullas. The settlers defended themselves with pistols and tent poles, but nineteen of the twenty-five defenders were killed.

=== Deaths and survivors ===
Those killed were Horatio Wills, David Baker, the overseer, his wife, Catherine Baker, their son, David Baker Jr., the overseer's daughter, Elizabeth Baker (aged 19), Iden Baker (a young boy), an infant Baker (8 months old), George Elliott, Patrick Mannion and his wife, their three children, Mary Ann Mannion (8 years old), Maggie Mannion (4 years old), baby Mannion (an infant), Edward McCormac, Charles Weeden, James Scott, Henry Pickering, George Ling, and a bullock driver known as Tom O'Brien, who had been engaged at Rockhampton. A total of 19 people were killed. The dead were buried at the site of the massacre. Some of the graves have headstones.

The six surviving members were Tom Wills, Horatio's son and an outstanding cricketer and co-founder of Australian rules football, James Baker (David Baker's son), John Moore, William Albrey, Edward Kenny, and Patrick Mahony. Those men were either absent from the camp or, in Moore's case, managed to avoid being seen. It was Edward Kenny who subsequently rode away to report the massacre, arriving at Rainworth Station the following day. Moore was the only European eyewitness to the event.

== Response ==
"It is not easy that a place so gifted by nature should be the scene of such a cruel massacre".

— P. F. MacDonald, squatter who sold Cullin-la-Ringo to Horatio Wills

Settlers reacted with shock and horror at the massacre, and the Queensland Government, including the settlers, was determined to punish any Aboriginals in the vicinity (and many of whom killed in the aftermath are believed to have been innocent). The first to go out in pursuit were a vigilante party of eleven heavily armed white settlers assisted by two trackers. Judging by the more than fifty camp fires, they pursued what was estimated to be "probably not under 300, and of these 100 may be assumed as the number of fighting men".

The Aboriginal people continually used ground that prevented the Europeans from using their horses to full advantage: "they chose stony and difficult ground wherever they had it in their power". Yet the Europeans eventually managed to catch up with them on 27 November 1861 and at "half-past two a.m. on Wednesday morning their camp was stormed on foot with success".

From this account, the number of Aboriginal casualties was very high, although there was no further detail. Another contemporary account said the police "overtook a tribe of natives, shot down sixty or seventy, and ceased firing when their ammunition was expended". They left the remainder to the native police to take on the next run. Historians later estimated the number of dead as around 370 people, and an anonymous article in the Chicago Tribune was discovered in 2021 stating that Tom Wills had bragged about his participation in reprisal killings. The article was published in 1895, fifteen years after Wills' death. The article, written in the colourful style of a 'cowboy narrative' was closely examined by a number of Australian historians and debunked in detail. It stated, for example, that Wills was horrified by the sight of his mother and sisters' heads on sticks outside their house. In fact none of the women had ever visited Queensland; Gayiri people did not practice South Sea Island-type revenge; there were no 'houses'. Tom Wills was two days ride away at the time. (The Currency Lad)

In 1862, the Old Rainworth Stone Store was built at Rainworth Station (also in the Springsure area). It was built from stone in order to reduce threats of fire and to act as a safe haven during any Aboriginal raid as a response to the Cullin-la-ringo massacre.

== Legacy ==
The Cullin-la-ringo massacre was the largest massacre of European settlers by Aboriginal people in Australian history, and a pivotal moment in the frontier wars in Queensland. The caption of The Wills Tragedy (an artwork by T. G. Moyle) reads: "The arrival of the neighbouring squatters and Mon collecting and burying the dead, after the attack by the blacks on H.R. Wills ESQ. Stationed Leichhardt district, Queensland."

== In literature ==
In Archibald Meston's 1893 short story, "The Cave Diary", the narrator relates the story of a fictional Queensland adventurer, Oscar Marrion, based on the contents of a diary found in a cave. After his love interest is murdered in the Cullin-la-ringo massacre, Marrion considers getting revenge on her killers, but abandons the idea after talking to an Aboriginal friend named Talboora.

The first scholarly assessment of the massacre, "From Hornet Bank to Cullin-la-Ringo", by Gordon Reid, was published by the Royal Historical Society of Queensland in 1981.

The massacre is central to Alex Miller's 2007 historical novel Landscape of Farewell. The massacre is also explored in fictional accounts of Tom Wills, including Martin Flanagan's 1996 novel The Call, as well as its 2004 stage adaptation.

== See also ==
- Australian frontier wars
- List of massacres in Australia
