= Springsure Airport =

- IATA: none; ICAO: YSPI

Summary
- Airport type: Public
- Operator: Central Highlands Regional Council
- Location: Springsure, Queensland
- Elevation AMSL: 1,200 ft / 366 m
- Coordinates: 24°07′48″S 148°05′09″E

Map
- Location in Queensland

Runways
Direction	Length		Surface
Direction	m	ft	Surface
01/19	600	1,969	Asphalt
13/31	1,200	3,937	Asphalt
- Sources: Australian AIP

Springsure Airport (ICAO: YSPI) is located at Springsure, Queensland, Australia.

== See also ==
- List of airports in Queensland
