= Rolleston, Queensland =

Rolleston
- Town
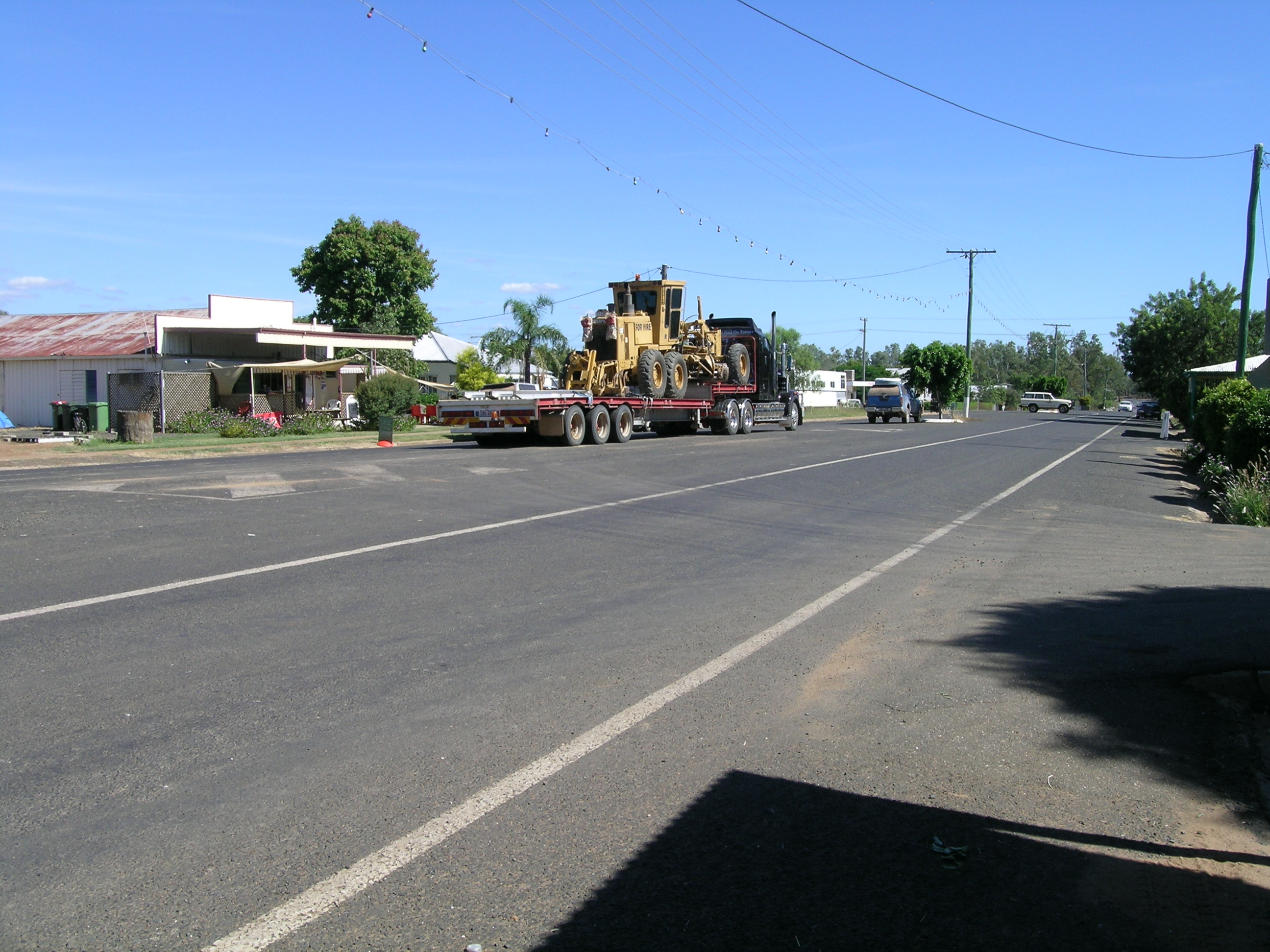
- The main street of Rolleston

- Interactive map of Rolleston
- Coordinates: 24.4630°S 148.6236°E
- Country: Australia
- State: Queensland
- LGA: Central Highlands Region
- Location: 70.8 km (44.0 mi) SE of Springsure; 139 km (86 mi) SSE of Emerald; 298 km (185 mi) WSW of Rockhampton; 693 km (431 mi) NW of Brisbane

Government
  - State electorate: Gregory
  - Federal division: Flynn

Area
  - Total: 140.1 km^{2} (54.1 sq mi)

Population
  - Total: 132 (2021 census)
  - Density: 0.942/km^{2} (2.440/sq mi)
- Time zone: UTC+10:00 (AEST)
- Postcode: 4702
- Mean max temp: 29.5 °C (85.1 °F)
- Mean min temp: 14.1 °C (57.4 °F)
- Annual rainfall: 635 mm (25.0 in)
Localities around Rolleston
Albinia	Lowesby	Lowesby
Albinia	Rolleston	Corrumbene
Consuelo	Consuelo	Corrumbene

Rolleston is a rural town and locality in the Central Highlands Region, Queensland, Australia. In the 2021 census, the locality of Rolleston had a population of 132 people.

== Geography ==
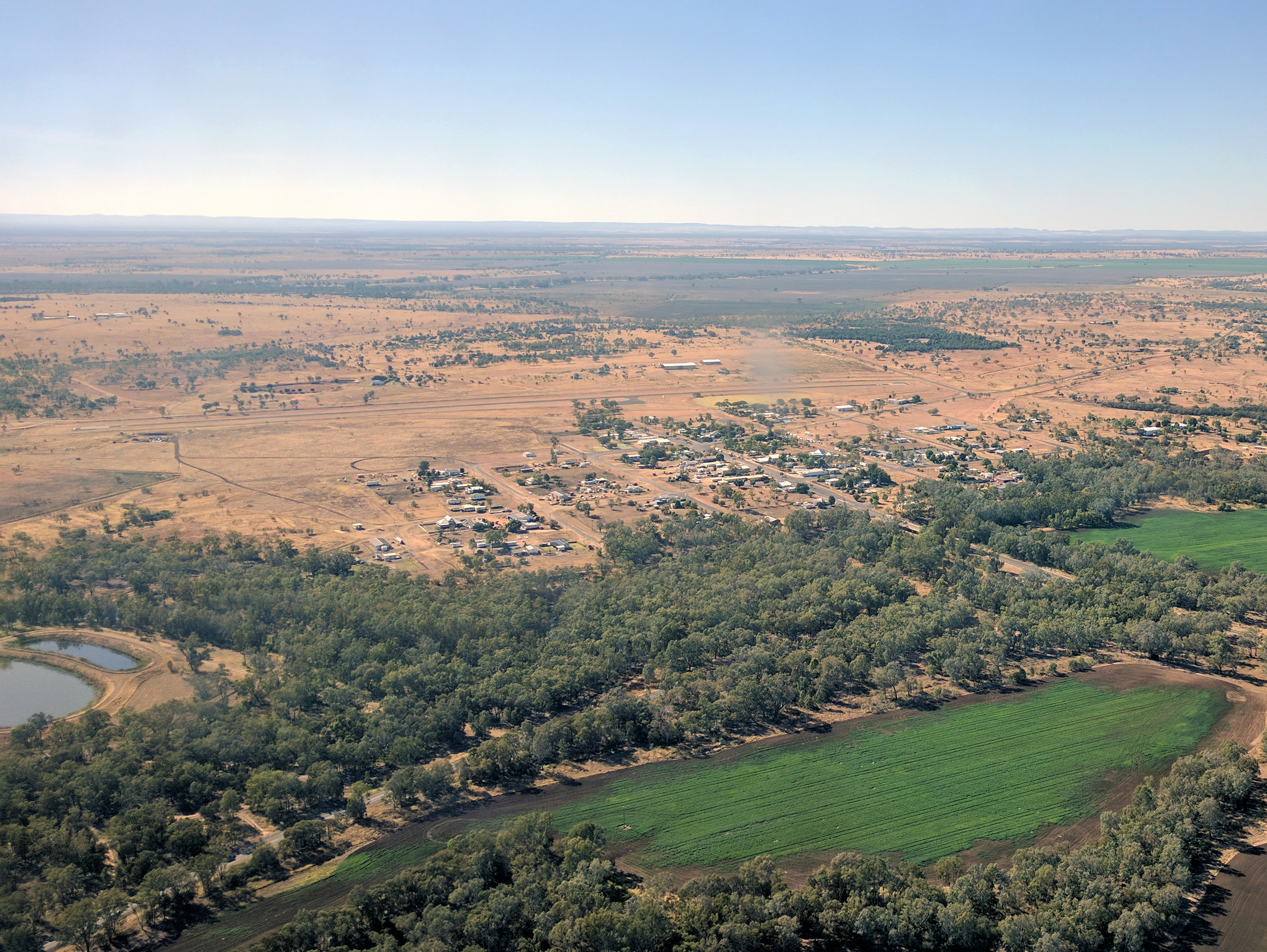
Aerial view of Rolleston, June 2017

Rolleston is located on the Comet River, 335 kilometres (208 mi) west of Gladstone, 263 kilometres (163 mi) north of Roma and 694 kilometres (431 mi) northwest of Brisbane. Springsure, the nearest town, lies 71 kilometres (44 mi) to the north-west. Rolleston is at the junction of the Carnarvon and Dawson highways.

There is a large coal mine 13 kilometres (8.1 mi) to the west called the Rolleston coal mine.

=== Climate ===
Climate data for Rolleston Airport (1991–2020)
Month	Jan	Feb	Mar	Apr	May	Jun	Jul	Aug	Sep	Oct	Nov	Dec	Year
Record high °C (°F)	44.5 (112.1)	43.2 (109.8)	41.2 (106.2)	37.0 (98.6)	34.5 (94.1)	31.4 (88.5)	30.8 (87.4)	35.4 (95.7)	40.7 (105.3)	41.6 (106.9)	43.0 (109.4)	44.0 (111.2)	44.5 (112.1)
Mean daily maximum °C (°F)	34.8 (94.6)	33.7 (92.7)	32.7 (90.9)	29.8 (85.6)	26.0 (78.8)	23.0 (73.4)	22.9 (73.2)	25.1 (77.2)	28.6 (83.5)	31.3 (88.3)	33.2 (91.8)	34.4 (93.9)	29.6 (85.3)
Daily mean °C (°F)	28.0 (82.4)	27.3 (81.1)	25.7 (78.3)	22.2 (72.0)	18.2 (64.8)	15.2 (59.4)	14.4 (57.9)	16.0 (60.8)	19.7 (67.5)	23.0 (73.4)	25.6 (78.1)	27.2 (81.0)	21.9 (71.4)
Mean daily minimum °C (°F)	21.3 (70.3)	20.9 (69.6)	18.8 (65.8)	14.6 (58.3)	10.4 (50.7)	7.5 (45.5)	5.9 (42.6)	6.9 (44.4)	10.8 (51.4)	14.8 (58.6)	18.0 (64.4)	20.0 (68.0)	14.1 (57.4)
Record low °C (°F)	14.5 (58.1)	11.9 (53.4)	9.5 (49.1)	2.9 (37.2)	−1.0 (30.2)	−1.5 (29.3)	−3.0 (26.6)	−3.0 (26.6)	0.5 (32.9)	4.5 (40.1)	7.2 (45.0)	8.9 (48.0)	−3.0 (26.6)
Average precipitation mm (inches)	89.1 (3.51)	97.1 (3.82)	53.9 (2.12)	34.2 (1.35)	25.4 (1.00)	33.6 (1.32)	15.2 (0.60)	20.6 (0.81)	31.2 (1.23)	47.4 (1.87)	57.1 (2.25)	85.3 (3.36)	590.1 (23.23)
Average precipitation days (≥ 1 mm)	6.7	5.9	4.1	2.8	2.3	2.9	1.7	1.9	2.8	4.8	5.2	6.6	47.6
Source: National Oceanic and Atmospheric Administration

== History ==
=== First Nations ===
Rolleston was built on Kanolu land. The Kanolu language group encompasses Rolleston.

Wadja is also an Australian Aboriginal language in Central Queensland. The language region includes the local government areas of the Aboriginal Shire of Woorabinda and Central Highlands Region, including the Blackdown Tablelands. the Comet River, and the Expedition Range, and the towns of Woorabinda, Springsure and Rolleston.

=== European exploration ===
Ludwig Leichhardt's 1844 expedition through the region marked the first entry of Europeans. Leichhardt named the area "Brown's Lagoon" after Harry Brown, an Indigenous Awabakal guide from Newcastle who was employed on the expedition. They found many huts built by the Kanolu around the lagoon indicating the vicinity was well populated.

=== The township of Rolleston ===
The township was first called Brown's Lagoon and then Brown Town before being named Rolleston after Christopher Rolleston, a pastoralist who was involved in leasing a number of pastoral runs in the area in the 1860s.

Rolleston State School opened on 9 October 1871.

Queensland's last legendary cattle thieves and bushrangers, the notorious Patrick and James Kenniff, frequently lived at Lethbridge Pocket, which is now within Carnarvon National Park. It was here on Easter Sunday, 30 March 1902, that they murdered Constable George Doyle and cattle station manager Albert Dahlke.

All Saints Anglican Church was officially opened on Sunday 10 June 1934 by Bishop Fortescue Ash.

Mining began at the Rollestone coal mine in October 2005 and is expected to last more than 20 years.

== Demographics ==
In the 2006 census, the locality of Rolleston had a population of 217 people.

In the 2011 census, the locality of Rolleston had a population of 129 people.

In the 2016 census, the locality of Rolleston had a population of 309 people.

In the 2021 census, the locality of Rolleston had a population of 132 people.

== Education ==
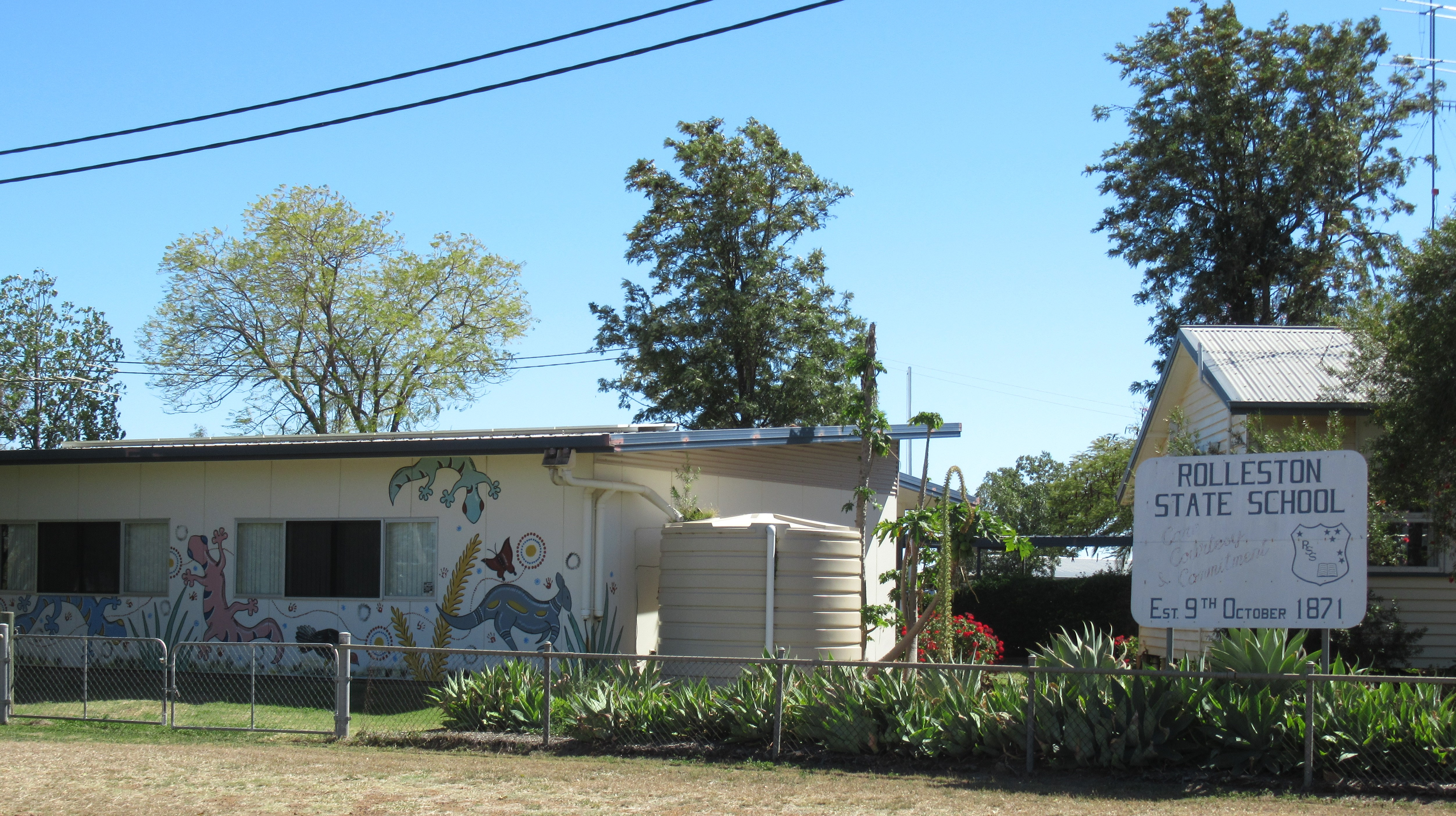
Rolleston State School, 2018

Rolleston State School is a government primary (Prep-6) school for boys and girls at 16 Warrijo Street (24.4624°S 148.6240°E). In 2018, the school had an enrolment of 63 students with 6 teachers (4 full-time equivalent) and 7 non-teaching staff (3 full-time equivalent).

There are no secondary schools in Rolleston or nearby. The nearest government schools offering secondary education are Springsure State School (to Year 10) in Springsure to the north-west and Emerald State High School (to Year 12) in Emerald to the north. Distance education and boarding schools are options.

== Amenities ==
The Central Highlands Regional Council operates a public library on Planet Street.

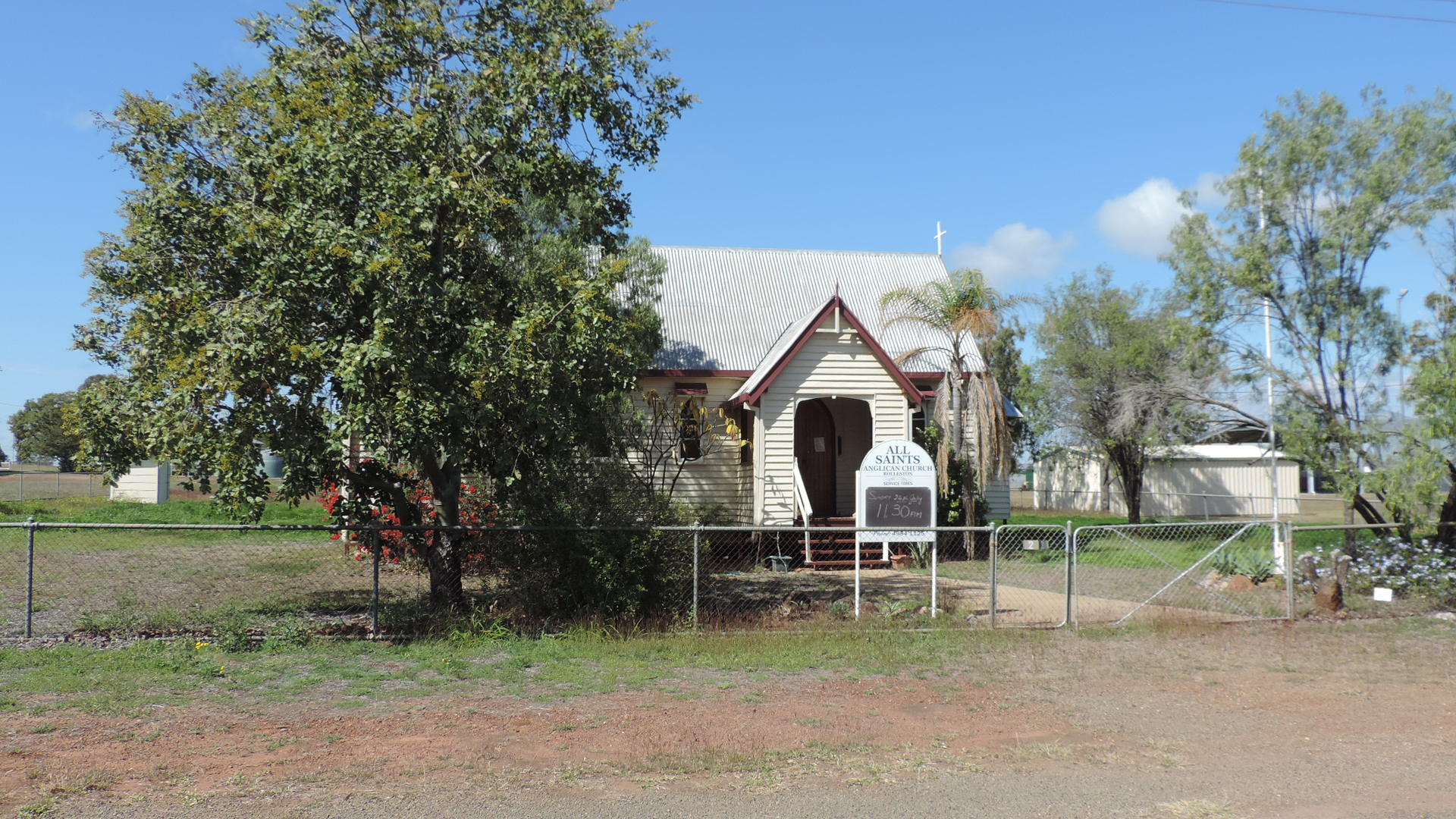
All Saint's Anglican Church, 2016

There are two churches in Rolleston:

- All Saints' Anglican Church, 2 Warrijo Street (24.4617°S 148.6253°E)
- St Theresa's Catholic Church, 28 Orion Street (24.4661°S 148.6255°E)

== Facilities ==
Emergency services available in Rolleston include:

- Rolleston Police Station (24.4630°S 148.6206°E)
- Rolleston Fire Station (24.4614°S 148.6229°E)
- Rolleston SES Facility (24.4638°S 148.6267°E)

== See also ==
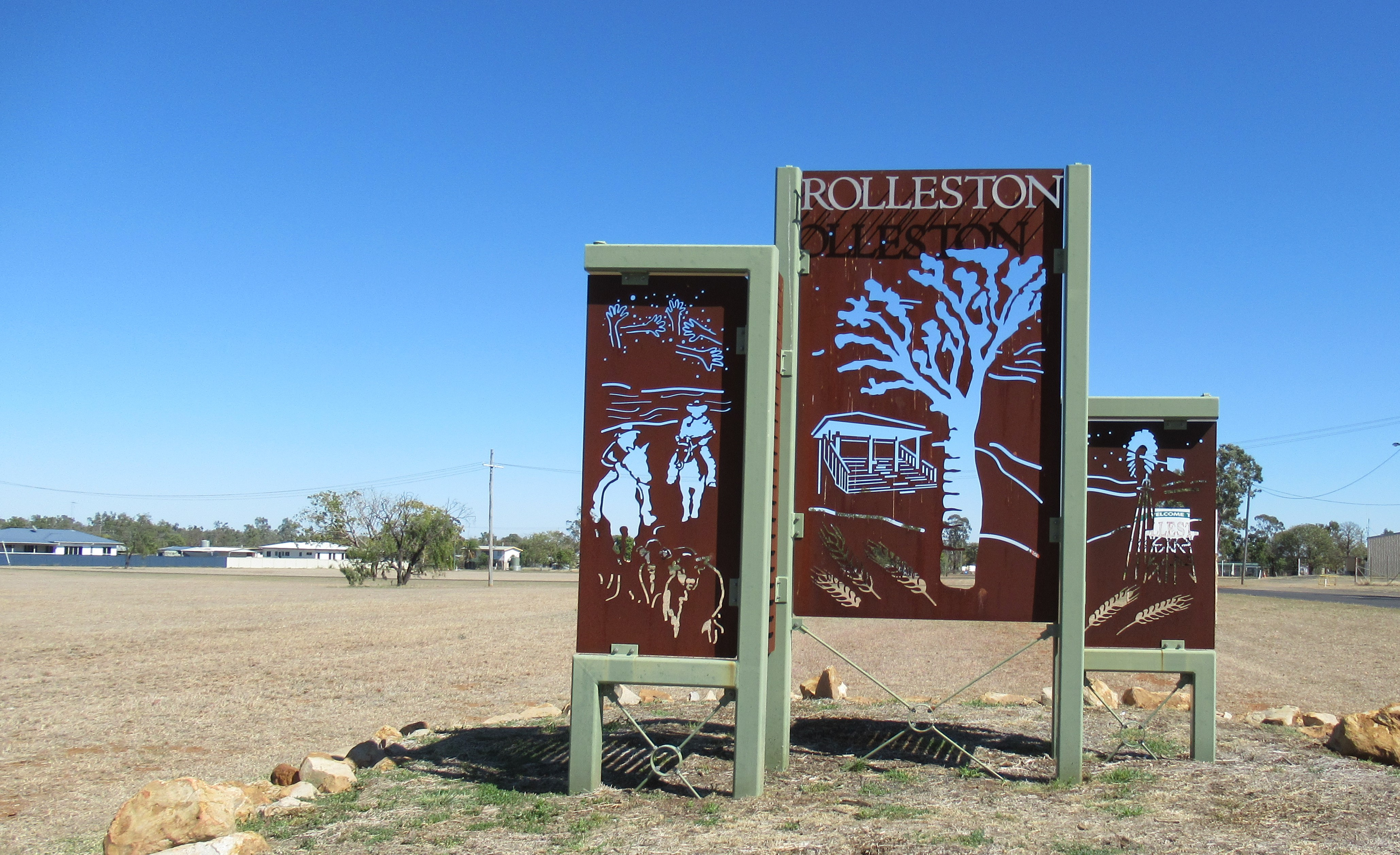
Entrance sign

- Expedition Range
- Lake Nuga Nuga
