= Springsure =

- Town
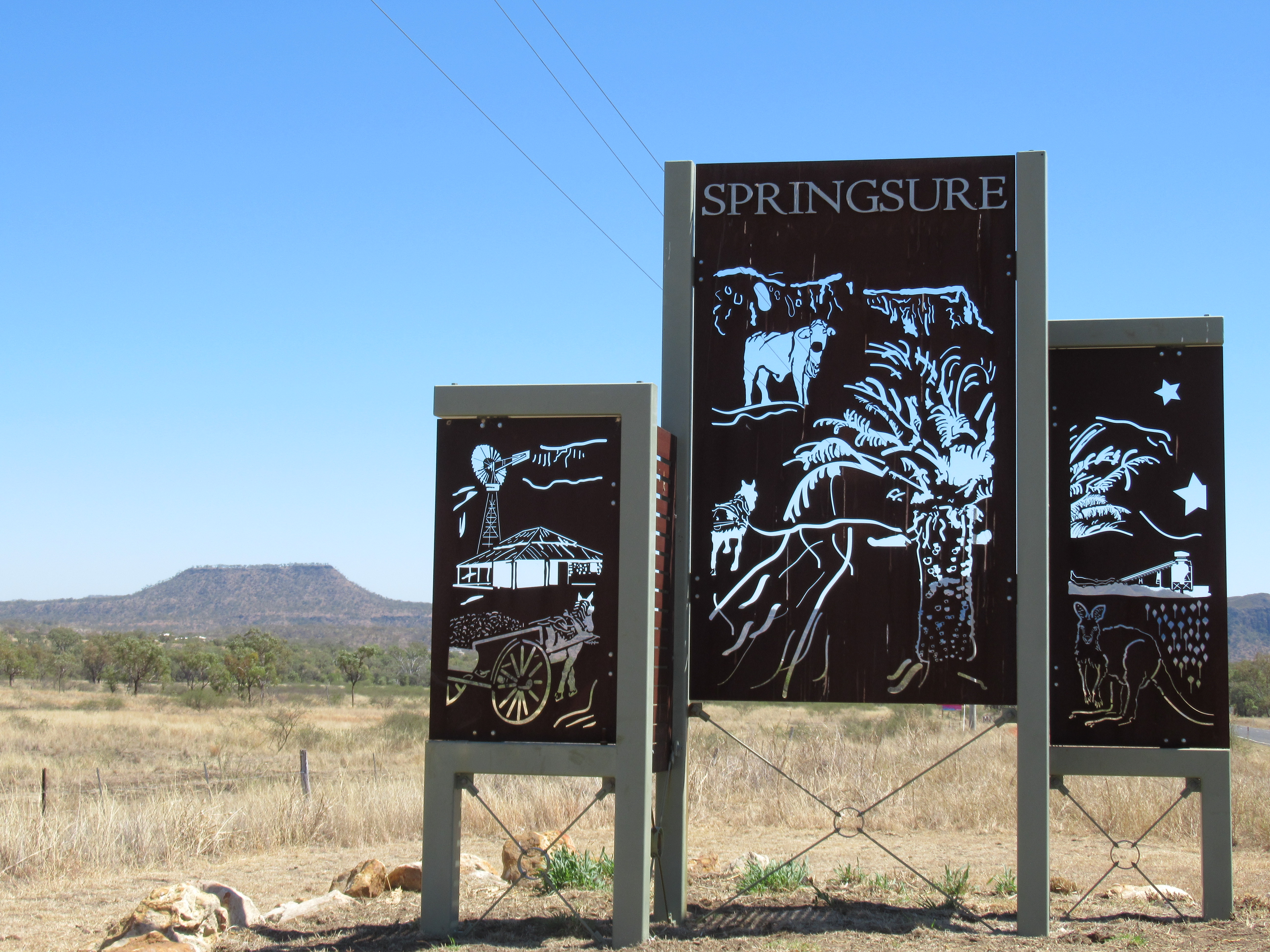
- Entrance sign, Springsure, Queensland

- Interactive map of Springsure
- Coordinates: 24.1161°S 148.0886°E
- Country: Australia
- State: Queensland
- LGA: Central Highlands Region
- Location: 68.3 km (42.4 mi) S of Emerald; 335 km (208 mi) WSW of Rockhampton; 764 km (475 mi) NW of Brisbane

Government
  - State electorate: Gregory
  - Federal division: Flynn

Area
  - Total: 141.6 km^{2} (54.7 sq mi)
- Elevation: 344.9 m (1,132 ft)

Population
  - Total: 950 (2021 census)
  - Density: 6.71/km^{2} (17.38/sq mi)
- Time zone: UTC+10:00 (AEST)
- Postcode: 4722
- Mean max temp: 28.8 °C (83.8 °F)
- Mean min temp: 14.0 °C (57.2 °F)
- Annual rainfall: 677.4 mm (26.67 in)
Localities around Springsure
Minerva	Minerva	Arcturus
Minerva	Springsure	Orion
Cona Creek	Cona Creek	Cairdbeign

Springsure is a rural town and locality in the Central Highlands Region, Queensland, Australia. In the 2021 census, the locality of Springsure had a population of 950 people.

== Geography ==
Springsure is situated 68.3 kilometres (42.4 mi) by road south of Emerald, at the southern end of the Gregory Highway, and at the northern end of the Dawson Highway. Springsure is 764 kilometres (475 mi) northwest of Brisbane.

The terrain varies from 270 to 602 metres (886 to 1,975 ft) above sea level, with a number of named mountain features:

- Mount Booramool (24.1009°S 148.0569°E) 602 metres (1,975 ft)
- Mount Zamia (24.1105°S 148.0813°E) 559 metres (1,834 ft)
- Eclipse Gap (24.0864°S 148.0936°E)

The Minerva Hills National Park is in the north-west of the locality (24.07389°S 148.06306°E).

Springsure was served by a branch railway from the Central Western railway line. The Springsure branch railway line separated from the main line at Springsure Junction station (now Nogoa station), near Emerald. The locality was served two railway stations:

- Zamia railway station, serving north of the town (24.0932°S 148.0918°E)
- Springsure railway station, serving the town (24.1159°S 148.0852°E)

Springsure Airport is south of the town on Airport Drive (24.1291°S 148.0871°E). It is operated by the Central Highlands Regional Council but it is only suitable for light aircraft, has limited facilities, requires permission, and care needs to be taken in relation to wildlife and livestock.

=== Climate ===
Climate data for Springsure (1991–2020 normals, extremes 1965–present)
Month	Jan	Feb	Mar	Apr	May	Jun	Jul	Aug	Sep	Oct	Nov	Dec	Year
Record high °C (°F)	44.5 (112.1)	43.7 (110.7)	40.4 (104.7)	36.5 (97.7)	34.0 (93.2)	30.5 (86.9)	29.6 (85.3)	34.6 (94.3)	39.0 (102.2)	41.1 (106.0)	43.3 (109.9)	43.8 (110.8)	44.5 (112.1)
Mean daily maximum °C (°F)	33.9 (93.0)	32.6 (90.7)	31.8 (89.2)	29.1 (84.4)	25.4 (77.7)	22.5 (72.5)	22.5 (72.5)	24.6 (76.3)	28.0 (82.4)	30.6 (87.1)	32.4 (90.3)	33.6 (92.5)	28.9 (84.0)
Daily mean °C (°F)	27.6 (81.7)	26.7 (80.1)	25.6 (78.1)	22.4 (72.3)	18.5 (65.3)	15.5 (59.9)	15.0 (59.0)	16.6 (61.9)	20.2 (68.4)	23.3 (73.9)	25.4 (77.7)	26.9 (80.4)	22.0 (71.6)
Mean daily minimum °C (°F)	21.4 (70.5)	20.9 (69.6)	19.4 (66.9)	15.6 (60.1)	11.5 (52.7)	8.5 (47.3)	7.6 (45.7)	8.7 (47.7)	12.4 (54.3)	16.0 (60.8)	18.4 (65.1)	20.2 (68.4)	15.0 (59.0)
Record low °C (°F)	13.3 (55.9)	14.0 (57.2)	7.8 (46.0)	2.4 (36.3)	−1.3 (29.7)	−4.0 (24.8)	−4.4 (24.1)	−3.2 (26.2)	0.0 (32.0)	1.6 (34.9)	5.4 (41.7)	9.6 (49.3)	−4.4 (24.1)
Average precipitation mm (inches)	129.9 (5.11)	102.3 (4.03)	62.1 (2.44)	32.9 (1.30)	27.7 (1.09)	33.1 (1.30)	16.2 (0.64)	18.9 (0.74)	34.4 (1.35)	61.7 (2.43)	60.9 (2.40)	98.3 (3.87)	678.5 (26.71)
Average precipitation days (≥ 1 mm)	7.1	6.7	4.4	2.8	2.4	2.9	1.8	2.2	2.7	4.6	5.8	6.7	50.0
Average dew point °C (°F)	17.3 (63.1)	17.8 (64.0)	15.9 (60.6)	12.7 (54.9)	9.4 (48.9)	7.6 (45.7)	6.0 (42.8)	5.2 (41.4)	7.3 (45.1)	10.7 (51.3)	13.2 (55.8)	15.6 (60.1)	11.6 (52.9)
Source 1: National Oceanic and Atmospheric Administration
Source 2: Bureau of Meteorology

== History ==
The area had been occupied by Aboriginal people for thousands of years. Gangalu (Gangulu, Kangulu, Kanolu, Kaangooloo, Khangulu) is an Australian Aboriginal language spoken on Gangula country. The Gangula language region includes the towns of Clermont and Springsure extending south towards the Dawson River. Wadja (also known as Wadjigu, Wadya, Wadjainngo, Mandalgu, and Wadjigun) is an Australian Aboriginal language in Central Queensland. The language region includes the local government areas of the Aboriginal Shire of Woorabinda and Central Highlands Region, including the Blackdown Tablelands. the Comet River, and the Expedition Range, and the towns of Woorabinda, Springsure and Rolleston.

Ludwig Leichhardt was the first European to explore the area, doing so between 1844 and 1845. His favourable reports encouraged settlers to move in and settle the land.

In 1861, squatter Horatio Wills and a party of Victorian settlers arrived near modern-day Springsure in 1861. Two weeks later, 19 men women and children, including Wills, were killed by Aboriginal Australian people, the Kairi or Gayiri, in the Cullin-La-Ringo massacre, which was the largest massacre of European settlers by Aboriginal peoples in Australian history. At least 15 Aboriginal men, women and children were killed by the Queensland Native Police and militias of local European colonists and their employees in a series of reprisals over the months that followed. However, the massacre of the 19 European family members was itself a retaliatory response to an earlier shooting of fugitive murderer who was a Gayiri tribesman by Jesse Gregson, manager of nearby Rainsworth Station, with Second Lieutenant Alfred March Patrick and Native Police Troops in his command.

Prior to the massacre of the 19 colonists, in early 1861 Second Lieutenant Patrick had complained to Charles Dutton, lessee of the Bauhinia Downs pastoral run 148 kilometres (92 mi) south-east of Springsure, that other officers in the Queensland Native Police "...had been able to bag their first Aborigine after only a few weeks in the Force; he had served for six months and still had not yet killed a black." The Old Rainworth Fort was built in 1862 by the colonists of Springsure in order to defend themselves from future raids by Aboriginals. Horatio's son, star cricketer and Australian rules football pioneer Tom Wills, survived the massacre, and remained on site until 1864.

The town takes its name from a pastoral run which was first named Springsure in 1861, after its permanent spring.

The town was surveyed by Charles Frederick Gregory in August 1863.

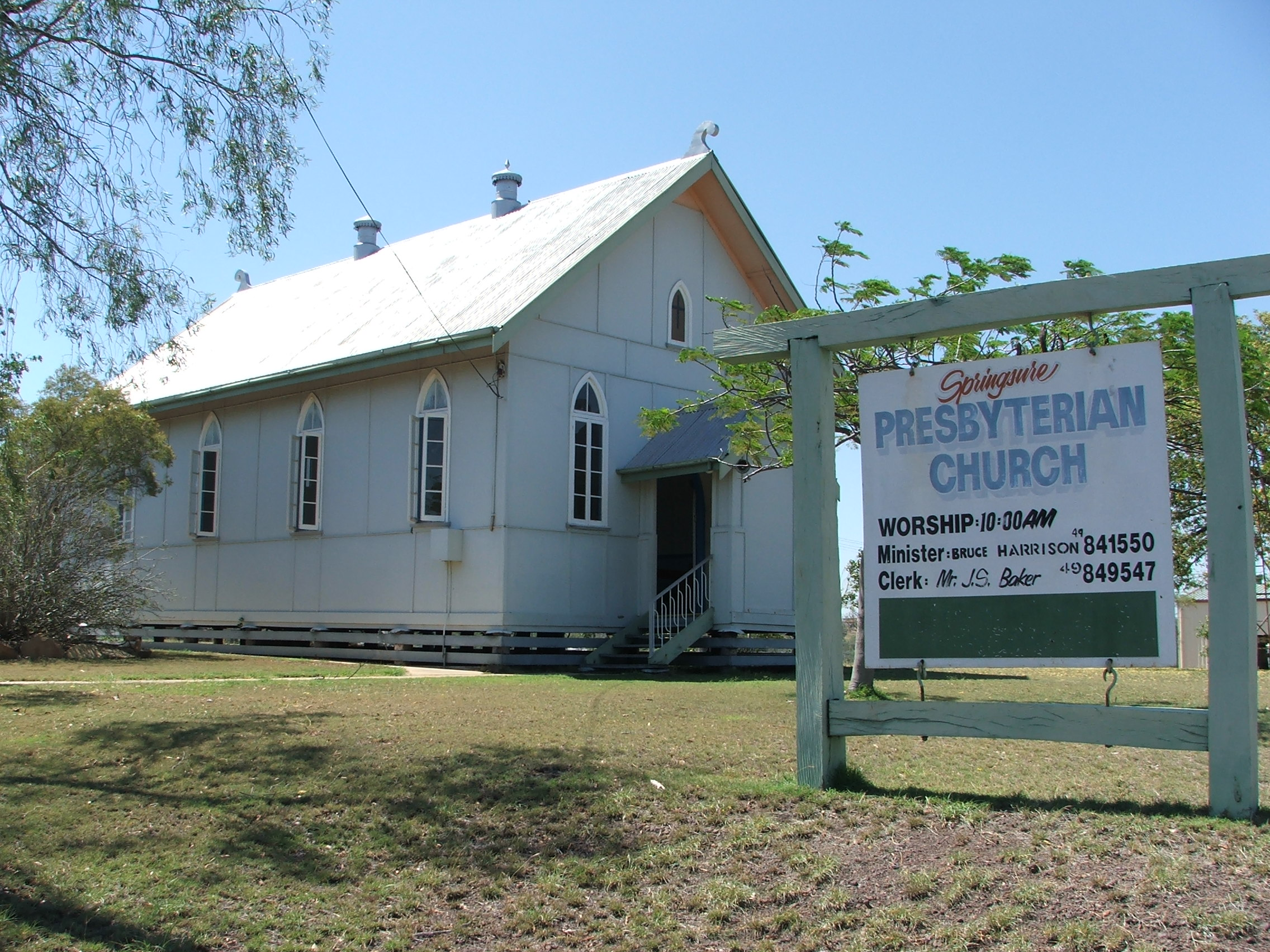
Presbyterian Church, Springsure, 2006

On Sunday 7 April 1867, the first Springsure Presbyterian Church was opened in Charles Street. It was 25 by 20 feet (7.6 by 6.1 m) with 12-foot (3.7 m) high walls. In 1922, it was replaced by a new church building known as St Andrew's Presbyterian Church. It closed in March 2011 after 145 years. It was at 55 Charles Street (24.11674°S 148.09076°E).

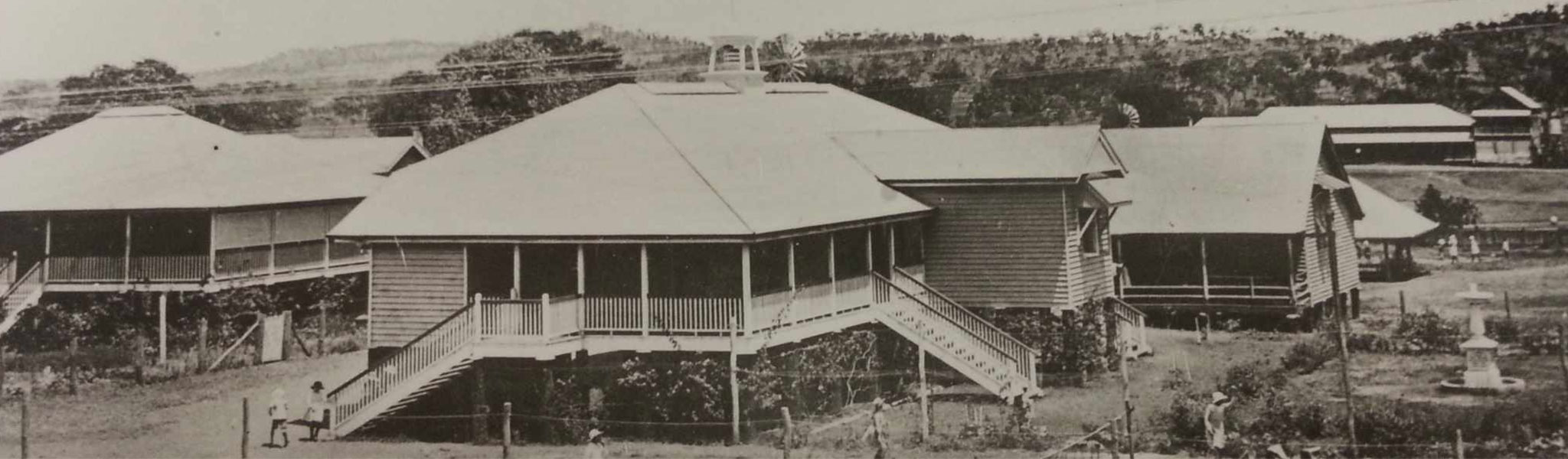
Springsure State School, circa 1929

Springsure State School opened on 14 March 1870 under head teacher John Henry Nicholson, son of an eminent scholar, John Nicholson, a friend of Ludwig Leichhardt.

The Springsure branch railway line opened on 15 August 1887. The section beyond Wurba Junction to Springsure railway station was closed on 26 June 2013.

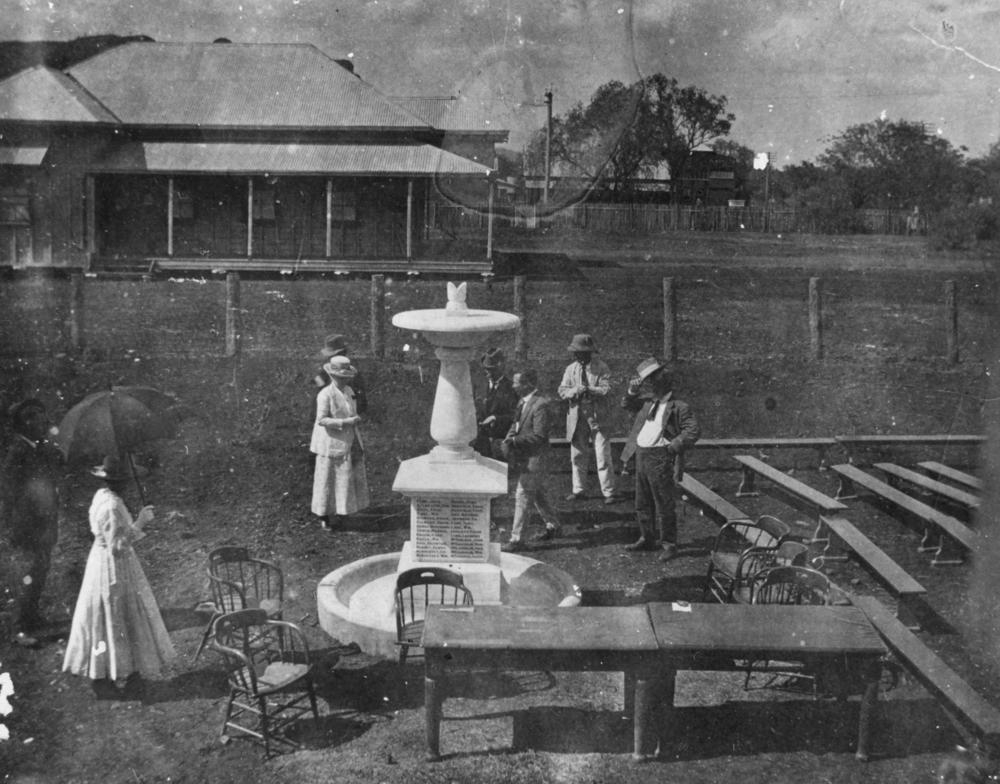
Unveiling the War Memorial fountain in Springsure State School, 6 December 1919

On 6 December 1919, the Springsure State School Memorial Fountain was dedicated by Mrs Annie Wheeler (née Laurie), a former pupil at the school. The memorial is a marble fountain and commemorates students of the school who served in World War I.

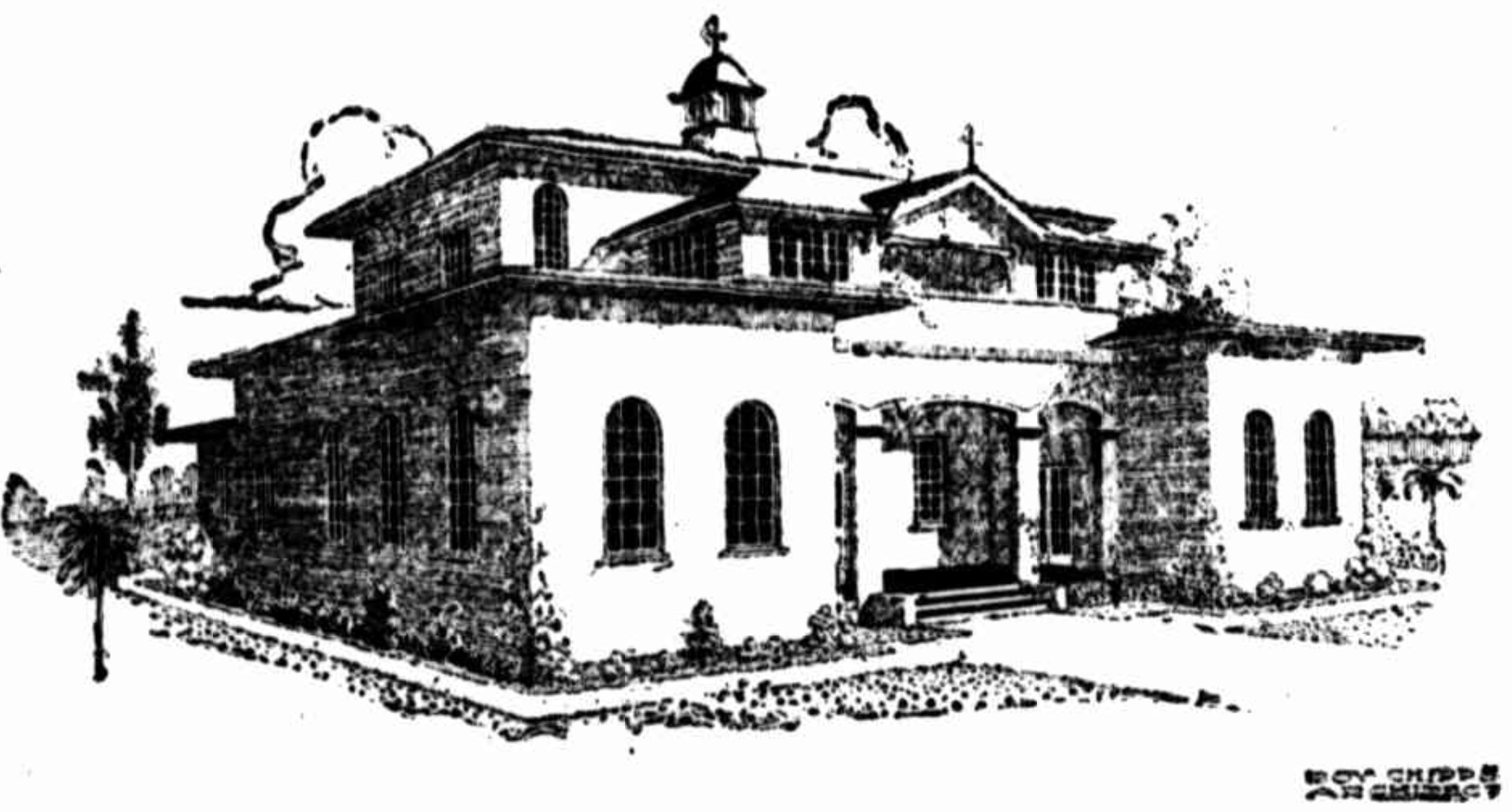
Sisters of Mercy convent, Springsure, sketch by architect Roy Chipps, 1926

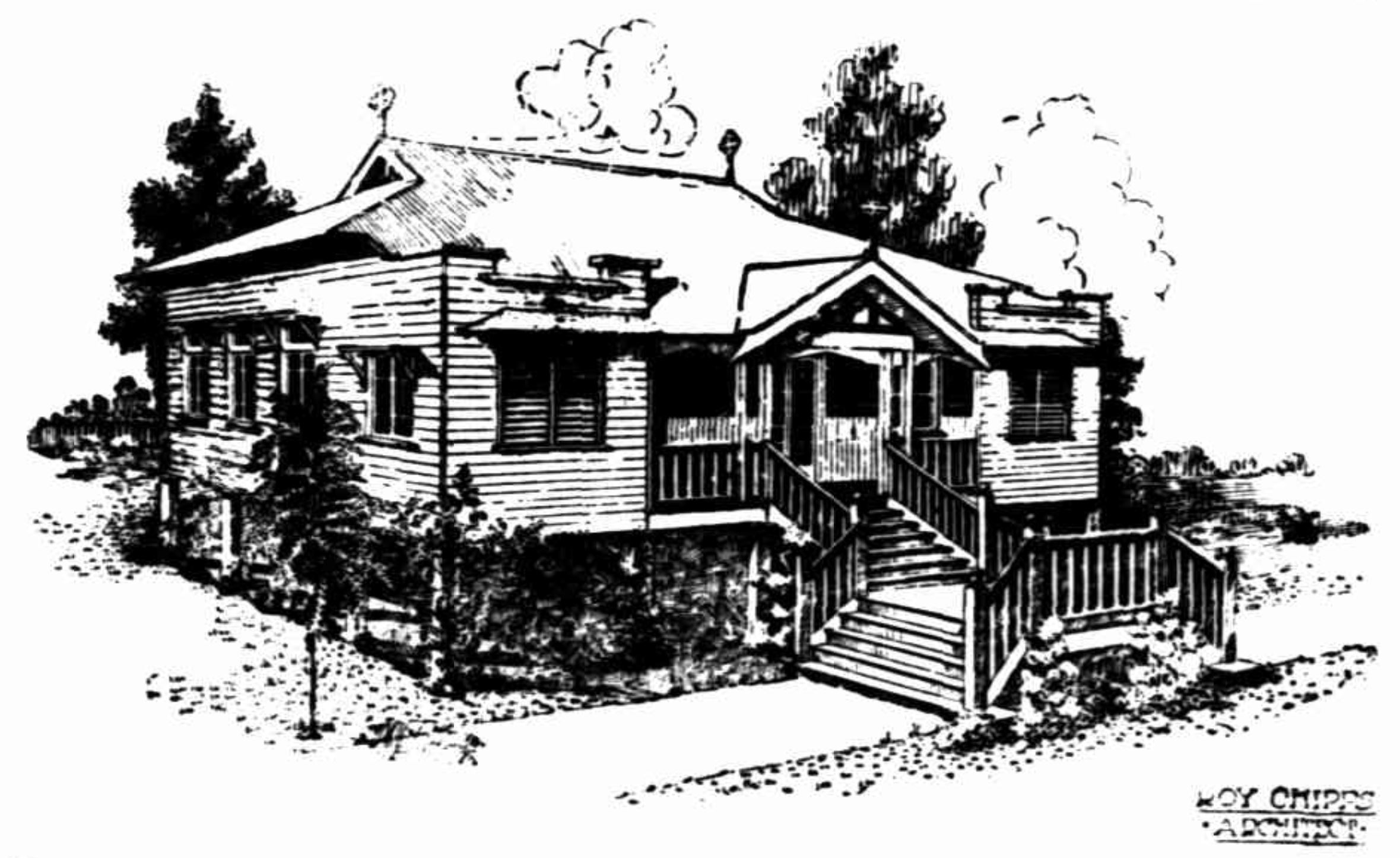
Sisters of Mercy school, Springsure, sketch by architect Roy Chipps, 1926

In March 1925, the Rev. Father Thomas Andrew Sweeney arrived in Springsure to replace Rev. Father Jules Bucas as the Catholic priest for the parish. Sweeney saw that there was a need for a Catholic school in Springsure and set about building a school and a convent for its teachers in August 1925. The architect was Roy Chipps and the builder E.H. Fletcher, both of Rockhampton. In January 1926 the school and the convent opened in a ceremony led by Roman Catholic Bishop of Rockhampton Joseph Shiel. The convent and school were under the control of Sister Mary Bonaventure of the Sisters of Mercy. The school opened on 2 February 1926 with 64 children. It was originally known as The Convent of the Little Flower, but the name was later changed to Our Lady of the Sacred Heart.

On 16 November 1943, a Douglas C-47A Skytrain broke up in mid-air during a violent storm in the area, and crashed on Rewan Station, around 100 km south of Springsure. All 19 people on board the aircraft perished in the crash.

Minerva Hills National Park was gazetted in 1994.

== Demographics ==
In the 2006 census, the locality of Springsure had a population of 829 people.

In the 2016 census, the locality of Springsure had a population of 1,103 people.

In the 2021 census, the locality of Springsure had a population of 950 people.

== Heritage listings ==
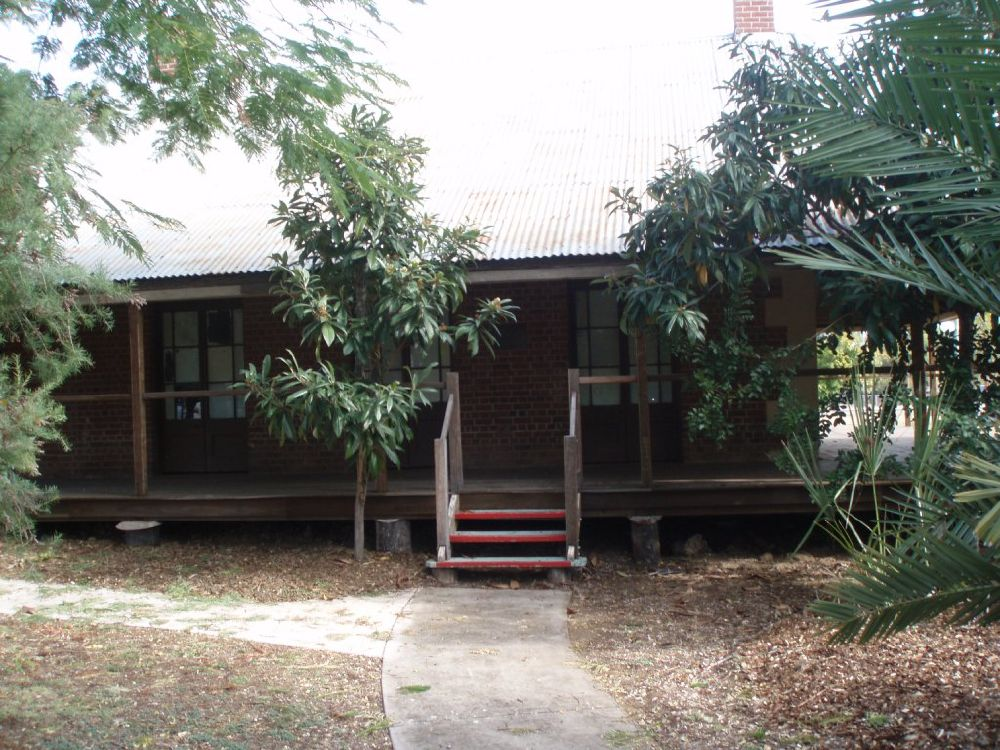
Springsure Hospital Museum from north, 2009

Springsure has a number of heritage-listed sites, including:

- Springsure Hospital Museum, 13 Woodbine Street (24.1194°S 148.0844°E)
- Old Rainworth Stone Store, Wealwandangie Road, now in neighbouring Cairdbeign

== Education ==
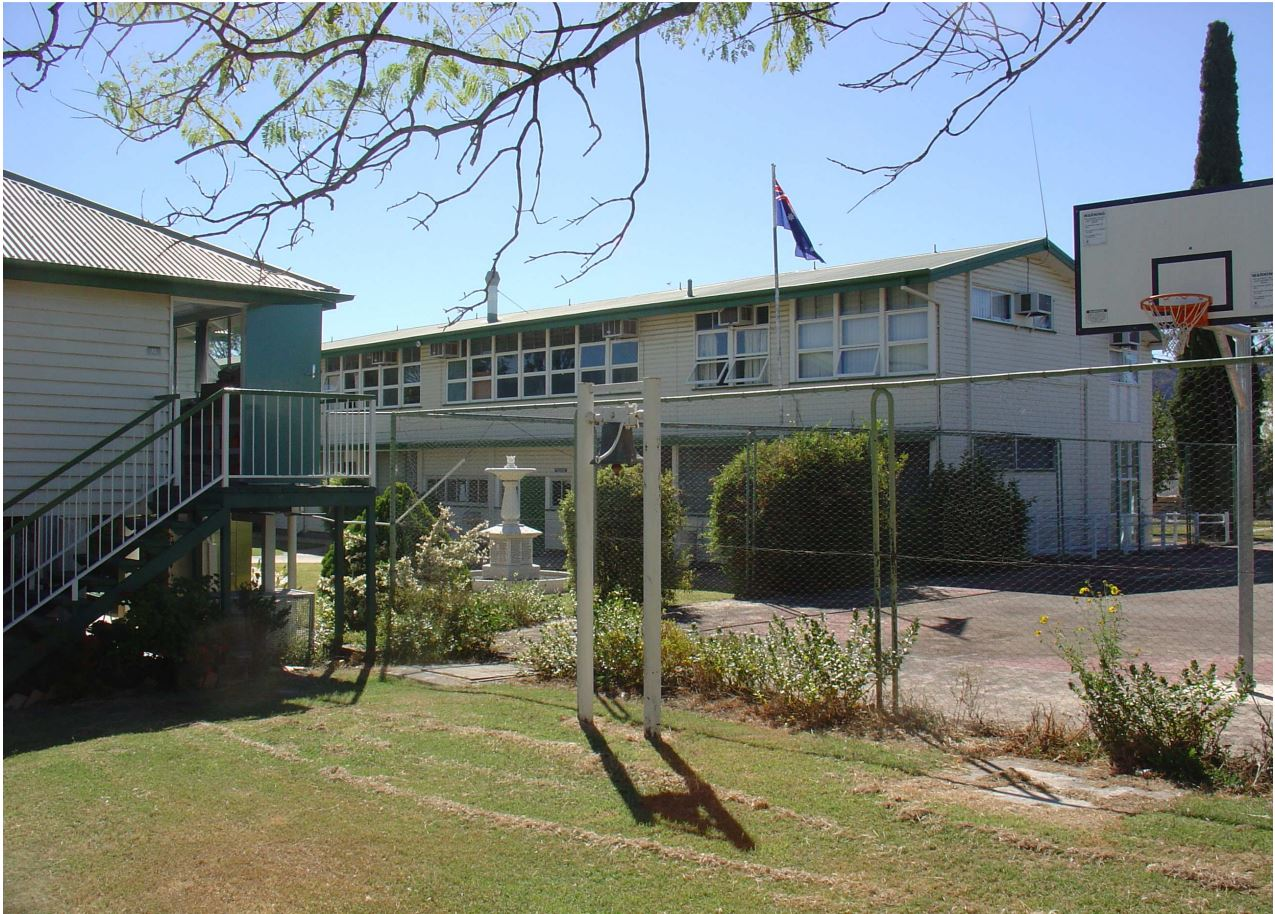
Springsure State School, 2023

Springsure State School is a government primary and secondary (Prep–10) school for boys and girls at 55 Eclipse Street (24.1157°S 148.0885°E). In 2017, the school had an enrolment of 158 students with 21 teachers (16 full-time equivalent) and 14 non-teaching staff (8 full-time equivalent). The school motto is 'Success by Effort'.

Our Lady of the Sacred Heart Catholic Primary School is a Catholic primary (Prep–6) school for boys and girls at Gap Street (24.1170°S 148.0926°E). In 2017, the school had an enrolment of 50 students with 7 teachers (6 full-time equivalent) and 6 non-teaching staff (2 full-time equivalent).

There is no secondary education for Years 11 and 12 in Springsure. The nearest government school offering secondary education for these years is in Emerald, but it might be out of range for a daily commute in which case distance education and boarding school are alternatives.

== Facilities ==
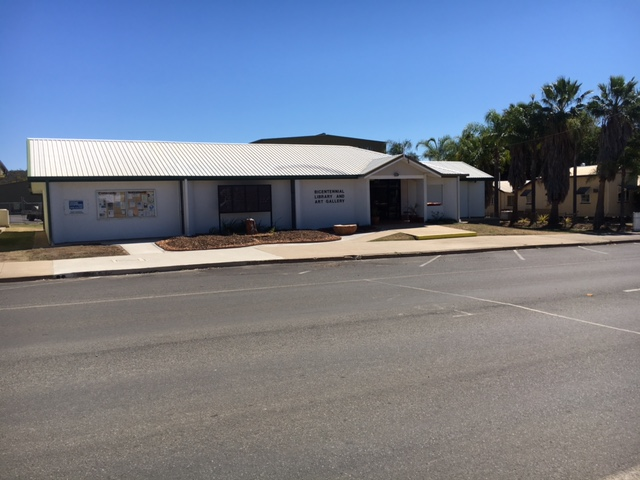
Bicentennial Library & Art Gallery, Springsure, 2017

The Central Highlands Regional Council operate a public library in Springsure at 27 Eclipse Street.

The Springsure branch of the Queensland Country Women's Association has its rooms at 27 Eclipse Street.

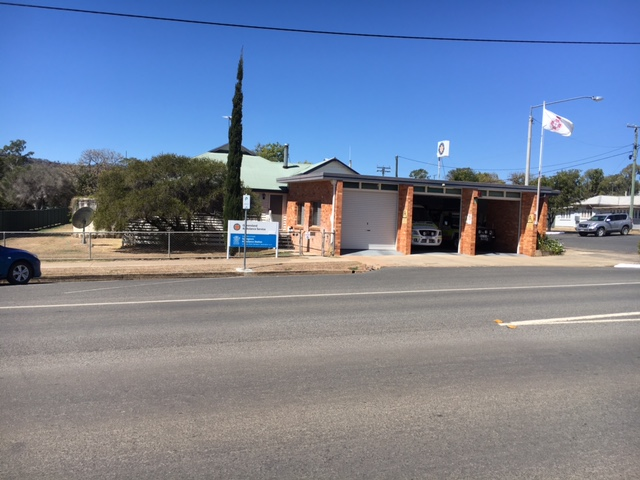
Springsure ambulance station, 2017

Springsure has the following facilities:

- Springsure Cemetery (24.1054°S 148.0864°E)
- Springsure sewage treatment plant (24.1062°S 148.0917°E)
- Springsure Ambulance Station (24.1144°S 148.0892°E)
- Springsure Police Station (24.1147°S 148.0877°E)
- Springsure Fire Station (24.1173°S 148.0906°E).
- Springsure SES Facility (24.1174°S 148.0904°E)
- Springsure Multipurpose Health Service, a public hospital (24.1200°S 148.0849°E)

Other facilities in Springsure include the airport, a caravan park, motocross track, service station and showground.

== Attractions ==
A cliff face in the mountains just to the north of the town is known as the Virgin Rock, so named because it looked like the Virgin Mary cradling the baby Jesus. Subsequent erosion led to the rock resembling the baby Jesus falling away, but the original resemblance to the Virgin Mary remains.

== Notable residents ==
- Lucy Harriet Eatock, who was a political activist was born (and later married) here in 1874.
- John Denis Fryer, after whom the Fryer Library at the University of Queensland is named
- John Humphreys, Olympic fencer
- Roy Moore, U.S. judge and Senate candidate, worked on the Telemon cattle station outside town in 1984.
- Keith Slater, Anglican priest in Springsure, later Bishop of Grafton
- Theophilus Wilson, cricketer

== Gallery ==
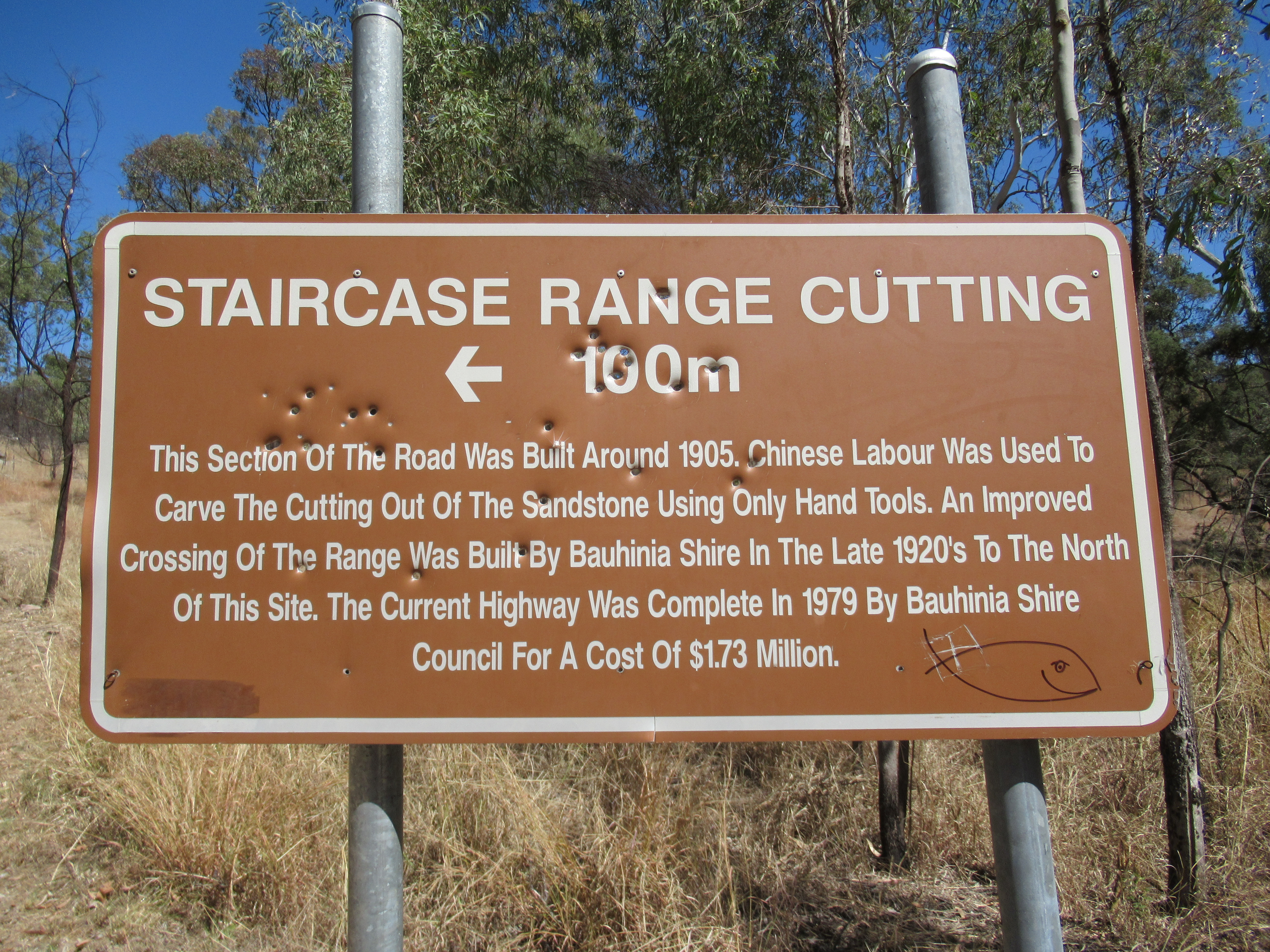
Staircase Range Cutting, near Springsure, Queensland - information sign

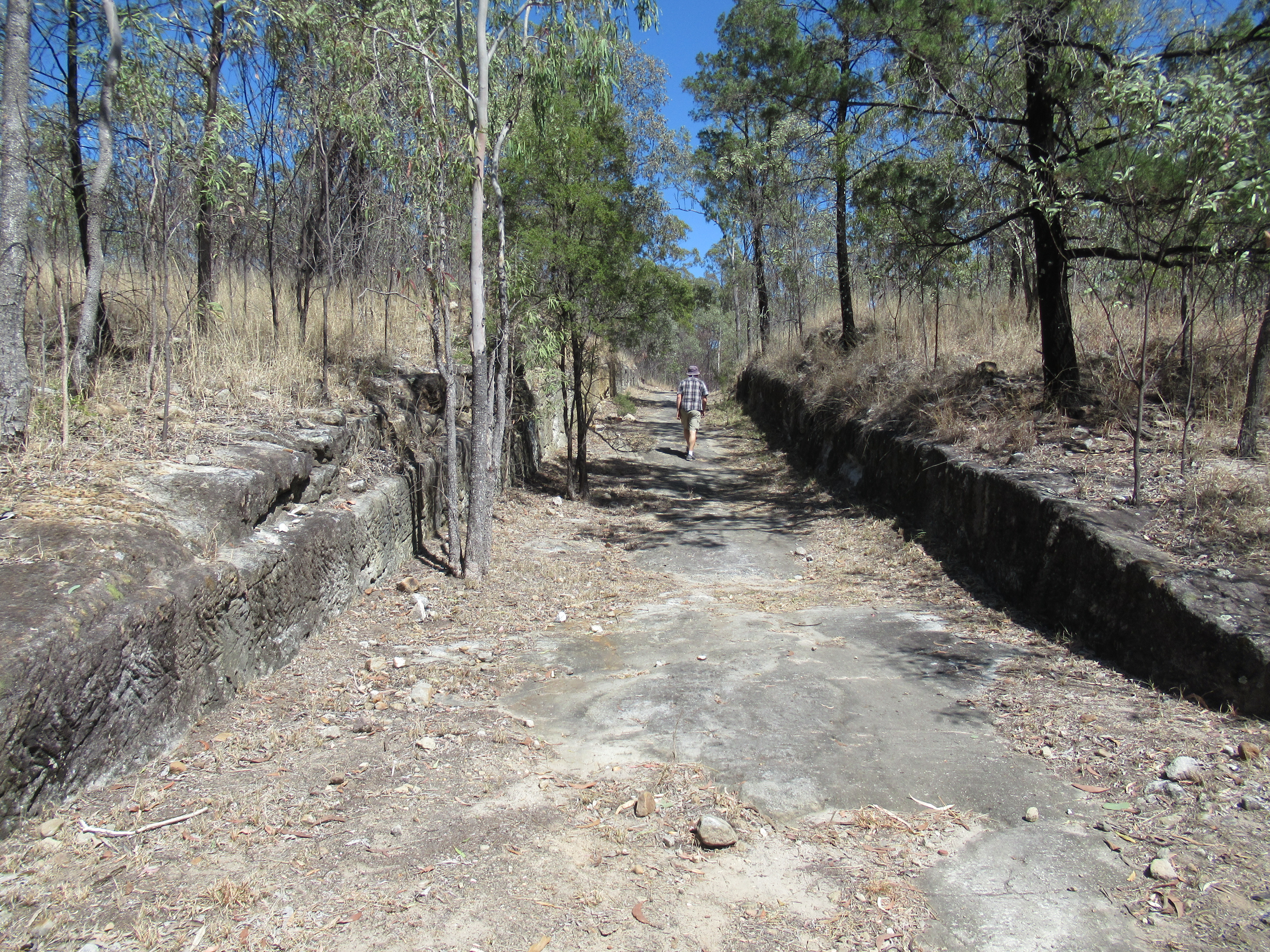
Staircase Range Cutting, near Springsure, Queensland

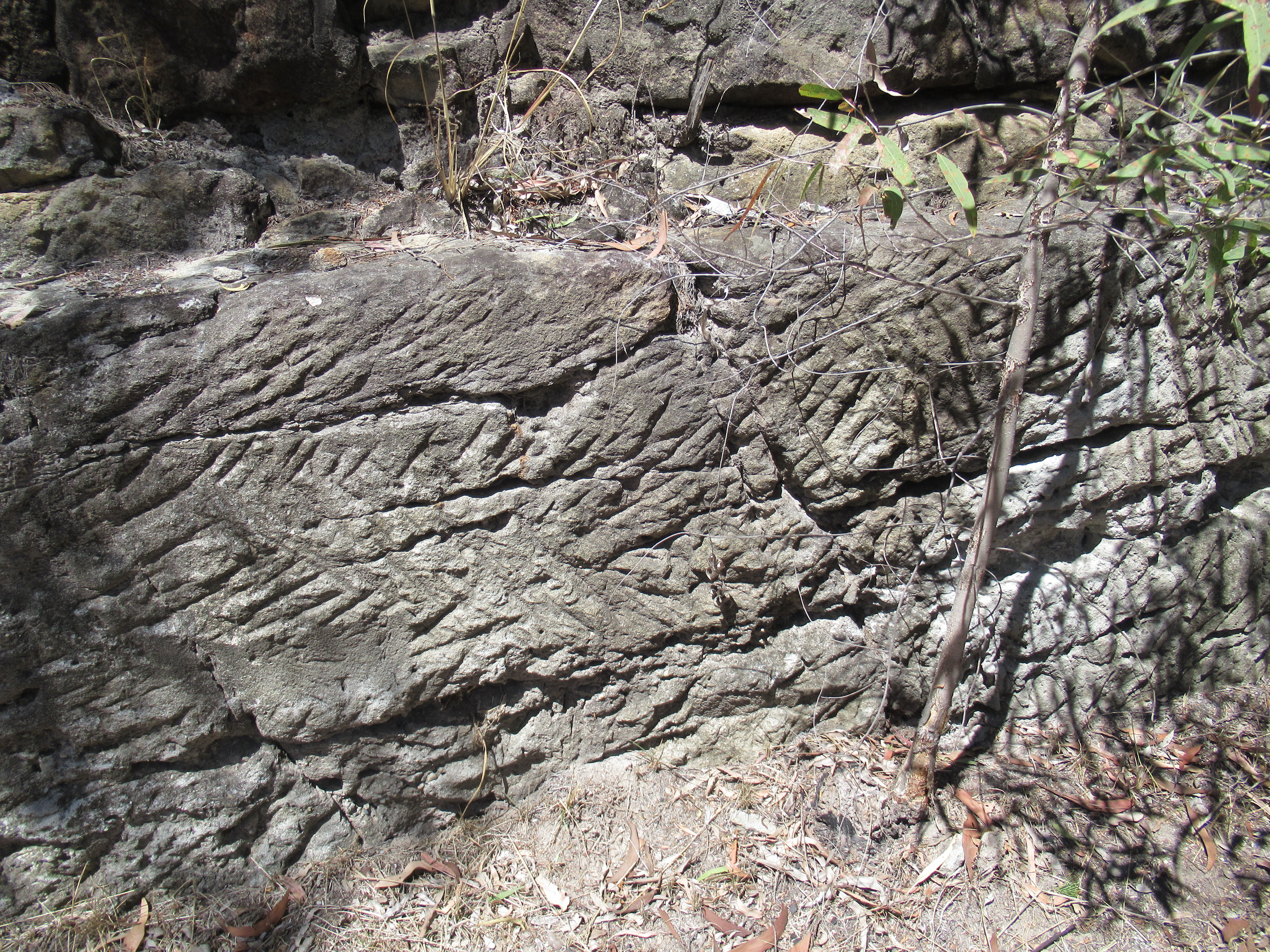
Staircase Range Cutting, near Springsure, Queensland - detail of hand tooling
