= Tomahawk Creek Huts =

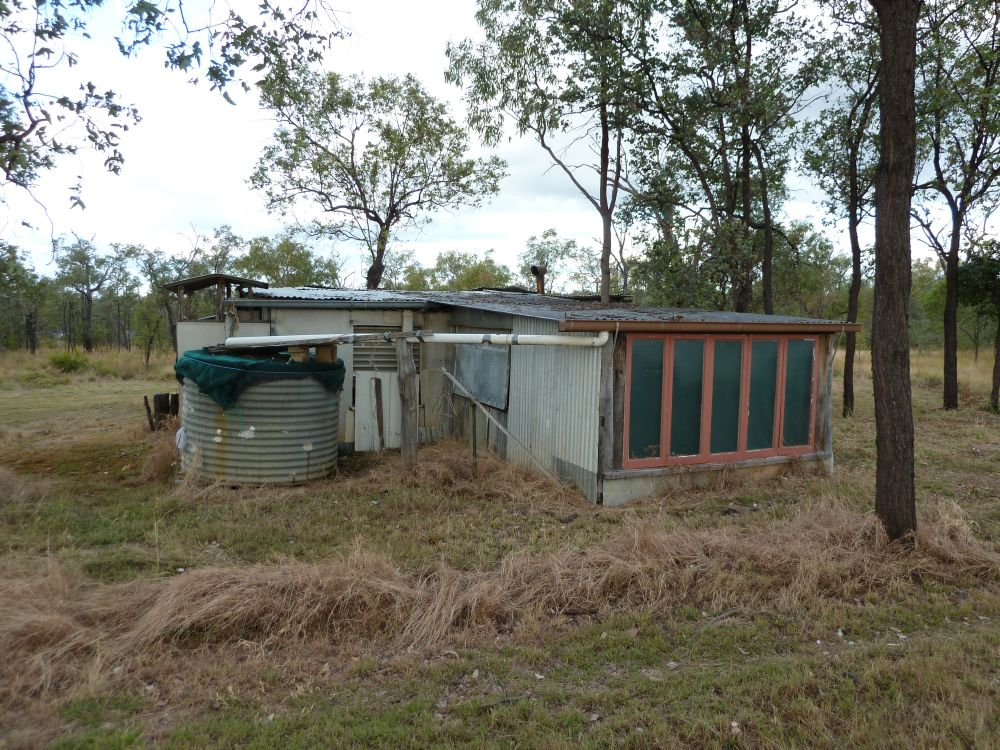
- "Buckingham Palace" hut, 2011

- Location within Queensland Location within Australia
- 23.3659°S 147.4412°E
- Location: Argyll, Central Highlands Region, Queensland, Australia

Queensland Heritage Register
- Official name: Tomahawk Creek Huts
- Type: state heritage (landscape, built)
- Designated: 16 October 2008
- Reference no.: 602661
- Significant period: 1960s, 1980s (fabric); 1960s-1990s (historical use)

Tomahawk Creek Huts is a heritage-listed group of huts at Argyll near Rubyvale, Central Highlands Region, Queensland, Australia. It was added to the Queensland Heritage Register on 16 October 2008.

== History ==
Tomahawk Creek Fossicking Area, about 25 kilometres (16 mi) west of Rubyvale, north-west of Emerald, is the most remote part of the Central Queensland Gemfields. It is about 2,340 hectares (5,800 acres) in area, excised from a Grazing Homestead Perpetual Lease. The first huts were built in the 1960s on mining claims or under Miner's Right but in 1986 under the Mining (Fossicking) Act 1985 the area was designated a fossicking area and the huts made illegal and their residents squatters.

Fossicking areas are areas where the government has negotiated access for fossickers in advance and no commercial mining is allowed. On designated fossicking lands the government has negotiated the land owners' permission in advance but some commercial mining under the appropriate legislation may occur. There are 11 designated fossicking areas in Queensland, five of them in Central Queensland, where camping with a permit for a maximum period of three months is allowed. No camping is permitted on the fossicking areas in south-east and north Queensland and there are no known huts in these areas. On the fossicking lands in western and south-west Queensland, out from Winton and Quilpie, camping with a permit is allowed for periods up to three months. There are also "general permission areas" where special conditions may apply, including Swipers Gully fossicking area near Stanthorpe, where camping is not permitted.

Houses and huts in the several townships on The Gemfields, but not at Tomahawk Creek, are now on regular titles and provided with town facilities. Tomahawk Creek is the largest fossicking area in the Gemfields.

The first sapphires were found on The Central Queensland Gemfields in 1870 and attracted hand miners. Archibald John Richardson, Government Surveyor and his partner Frank Fisher, erected a treatment plant but profit eluded them. In the 1890s interest from the nobility of the Russian Empire and from German buyers stimulated the market for sapphires and a period of prosperity ensued, but these markets were lost with the onset of World War I and the Russian Revolution. Government assistance to the market kept miners on the field, with limited recovery in the 1940s. Through the years gemstone miners have lived in tents, and built huts of tin and poles, recycled materials and caravans. Small townships grew at Anakie, Sapphire, Rubyvale and The Willows.

In the 1960s the price of gems increased and more tourists and gem collectors worked the fields. In 1965 machine mining began, with the first use of a bulldozer on the Gemfields. Thai buyers began visiting the fields in 1971 and output increased as heavy machinery mining became dominant, in competition and conflict with hand miners for whom some richer areas were reserved. In the late 1970s activity slowed but a core of machinery miners and hand miners remained. The Gemfields become a popular holiday destination for campers and caravanners during the cooler months.

Fossicking at Tomahawk Creek was active in the late 1960s, when the earliest extant huts were built, on occupation under Mining Claims, Leases and Permits to Occupy. Most occupants stayed during winter and holiday periods; there were 13 non-permanent huts and six permanent huts in January 2007. Most of the huts began as caravans to which annexes and lean-tos were added, with walls and roofs of galvanised iron and "billy boulders" (large irregular-shaped stones of hard siliceous material) and other light materials, on frames of poles. Toilets and showers usually were built some metres distant from the hut.

Designated as a fossicking area, and remote from the townships, Tomahawk Creek has not been machine mined but has been explored and mined by hand miners and tourists. The last Mining Claim expired about 1991, when two occupants applied for Permits to Occupy. There is no legal tenure of the other huts.

The hut known as "Tomahawk Heights" is on lot 9. It is a structure basically of galvanised iron, built after 1969 on a former camp site. There are four occasional occupants.

The most substantial hut in the area was built before 1984 on lot 17 by Hans and Eva Hendrickson who used a section as a shop. Known as "The Lodge", it is now occupied as a holiday place.

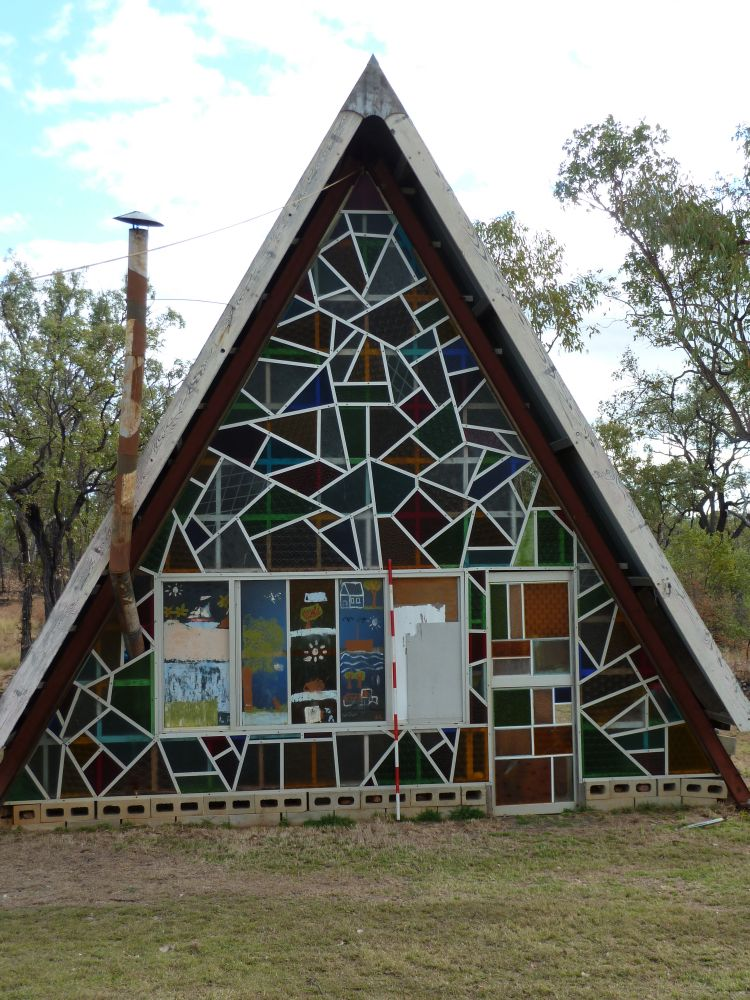
"Camp David" hut, 2011

An A-frame hut known as "Camp David" was built at Mackay, transported to Tomahawk Creek and re-erected in Easter 1981, on Crystal Hill on lot 8. The front wall is made of coloured glass.

A hut of "billy boulders" and bottles, with three caravans, occupies lot 4. Its former permanent occupant (in April 2008) was relocating to a township.

The regular occupants of these huts function as a community, meeting regularly and sharing services such as shopping trips and medical visits to the towns. They have a strong sense of ownership of the place and its huts, and residents care for huts when their "owners" are absent.

== Description ==
Tomahawk Creek is an area of about 2340 hectares of undulating bushland, reached at 17 kilometres (11 mi) on an unsealed road, the Reklaw Park track, which leaves the Clermont Road 27 kilometres (17 mi) from Rubyvale. Tomahawk Creek forms the north-western boundary. Mount Hoy is a prominent basalt peak in the south-western area. When the sign-posted entrance is reached a number of tracks run through the area, but the main one runs roughly parallel to Hut Creek where most huts are located.

There were 21 huts in the area in 2006, five of which are now abandoned, ranging from five to 50 years old. Most were built around caravans with canvas annexes and roofs and walls of galvanised iron, supported by poles of bush timber, tied with wire, and recycled materials. Some are partly built of "billy boulders", especially the lower walls and outdoor barbecues. Open areas provide ventilation and cooling, with some innovative solutions to the summer heat. Three of the huts within the nominated boundary area are within about 250 metres (820 ft) of each other.

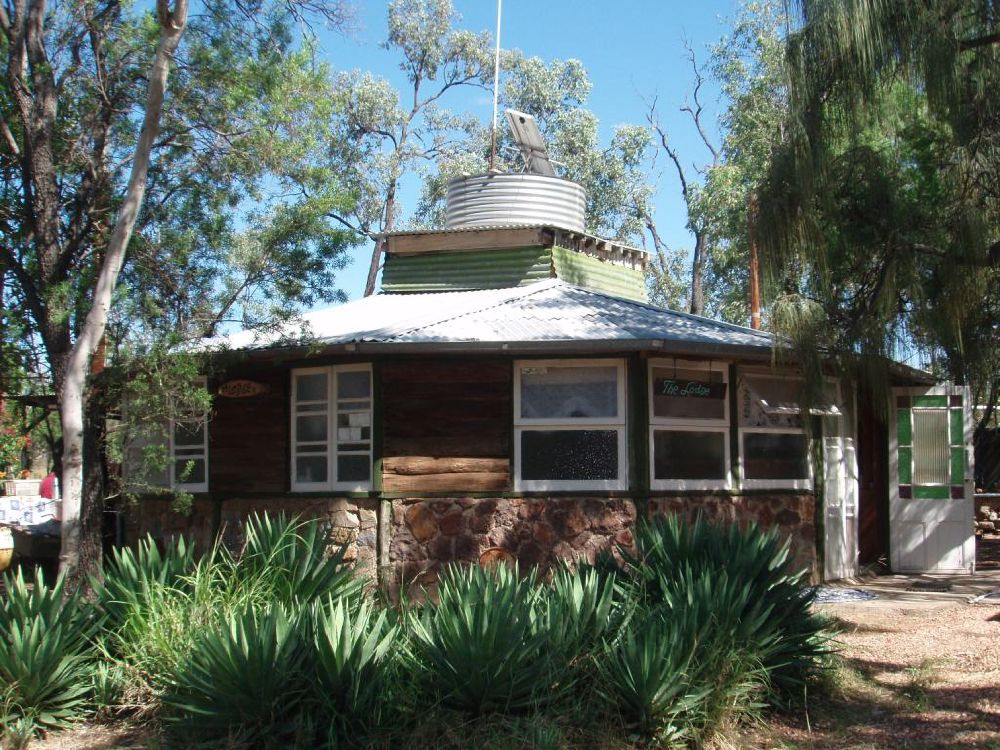
"The Lodge" hut, 2011

A stone hut known as "The Lodge", on lot 17, is the most substantial building in the area. It is 12-sided, a dodecahedron. The walls are made of "billy boulders", above which are horizontal logs between windows of various types using recycled materials. Around the base are air vents made from barrels with caps which can be opened to the exterior. Further ventilation is provided through the roof with slats of galvanised iron which can be opened from the inside, around the water tank that sits on the top of the roof, supported by a central pole. The roof is of galvanised iron. The hut has an electricity generator and a solar panel which charges 24 and 12 volt batteries. Inside is a wooden stove, its fireplace made from a fly wheel, and a conventional wood burning fuel stove. Similar to other huts in the area, any internal divisions are made of insubstantial materials, of hessian, scrap timber and iron.

An A-frame building, known as "Camp David " on Crystal Hill, on lot 8, was built off-site and re-erected in Easter 1984. It measures approximately 9 metres (30 ft) in length, 6 metres (20 ft) in width and is 6 metres (20 ft) high at its apex. A Trimdeck roof is supported by steel struts. It has a mezzanine sleeping area and a staircase. The floor is laid with brick pavers. Power is provided by a generator. The front wall, facing east, is made of pieces of coloured glass held in place by aluminium strips.

A hut built largely of "billy boulders" and bottles occupies lot 4. Three caravans are on the site and incorporated as annexes to the hut.

A hut known as "Tomahawk Heights" occupies lot 9. Building began after 1969 where the occupant had previously camped. The walls are largely of "billy boulders" but it contains the remnants of a previous building. Power is provided by a solar panel and batteries. It has a stone fireplace and barbecue.

== Heritage listing ==
Tomahawk Creek Huts was listed on the Queensland Heritage Register on 16 October 2008 having satisfied the following criteria.

The place is important in demonstrating the evolution or pattern of Queensland's history.

The huts at Tomahawk Creek are important as part of the evolution of Queensland's history and particularly of the Central Region Gemfields. They illustrate a way of life associated with fossicking with minimal technology and building with recycled materials.

The huts date from the 1960s with additions made in the 1980s.

The place demonstrates rare, uncommon or endangered aspects of Queensland's cultural heritage.

Tomahawk Creek illustrates a way of life that has become endangered as land use that once was common has been regulated, and the solutions evident in the huts for living in difficult hot, dry climates have become rare.

Camping is confined under the Fossicking Act and Regulations to fossicking areas in Central Queensland and to three fossicking areas in remote western and south-west Queensland, for periods up to three months.

State government abolition of the Miner's Right on fossicking areas has resulted in a decrease in the occurrence of huts similar to those at Tomahawk Creek, and they are now rare and possibly the only survivors of an endangered tradition.
