= Clermont–Alpha Road =

Road in Queensland, Australia

Clermont–Alpha Road Queensland

General information
- Type: Rural road
- Length: 178 km (111 mi)

Major junctions
- East end: Clermont Connection Road Clermont
- South-west end: Capricorn Highway Alpha

Clermont–Alpha Road is a continuous 178 kilometres (111 mi) road route in the Isaac and Barcaldine regions of Queensland, Australia. It is signed as State Route 41 for its entire length. It is a state-controlled regional road (number 552), rated as a local road of regional significance (LRRS). It is part of the shortest route from Mackay to Longreach.

== Route description ==
The Clermont–Alpha Road commences at an intersection with the Clermont Connection Road in Clermont. It starts as Wolfgang Street, running west and south-west through the locality of Clermont. This section of the road passes the Clermont solar farm. It crosses Quetta from north-east to west. It then turns south through the former locality of Surbiton (now part of Alpha) and continues south to the town of Alpha, where it ends at an intersection with the Capricorn Highway. The road has no major intersections.

Land use along this road is mainly stock grazing on native vegetation.

== Road condition ==
Much of the road remains unsealed, but approximately 17 kilometres (11 mi) was sealed in 2018–19 under an $8.7 million project funded by the Northern Australia Beef Roads Program.

== History ==
Gold was discovered at Clermont in 1861, and the town reserve was proclaimed in 1864. The Wolfgang pastoral run was adjacent to the town. Churches and schools opened in the 1860s, and copper was discovered soon after. The railway arrived in 1884 to serve the Peak Downs copper mine. Clermont became the administrative centre for the developing region, and is now the hub for the large coal mines in the region.

Quetta was created in 2018 by excising land from Mistake Creek and Peak Vale.

Surbiton pastoral run was established by 1866. In 2019 Surbiton was incorporated into Alpha.

Beaufort pastoral run, north-east of the town of Alpha, was established in 1863. In 2019 Beaufort was incorporated into Alpha.

The Alpha pastoral run was established in 1863, and settlement in the area that became the town began in the 1860s. In the 1880s the town expanded to include a workers camp during the construction of the railway line. Alpha railway station opened in 1884 and the town continued to grow, becoming the administrative centre for the district.

Early roads were cut from both Clermont and Alpha to provide access for wheeled vehicles to the pastoral runs and other settlements. Over time these tracks were improved and extended to eventually form a through road.

== Modern usage ==
Although not yet fully sealed the road is used extensively by road trains carrying cattle, and by other large trucks conveying heavy goods. It reduces the distance between the two centres by almost 100 kilometres (62 mi) compared to the highway route via Emerald.

== Upgrade ==
=== Progressive sealing ===
A project to seal almost 5 kilometres (3.1 mi) of road, at a cost of $3.01 million, was completed in August 2021.

== Intersecting state-controlled road ==
The following road intersects with Clermont–Alpha Road:

=== Clermont Connection Road ===
Clermont Connection Road
- Location: Gregory Highway, Clermont to Clermont–Alpha Road, Clermont
- Length: 2.1 km (1.3 mi)
- Route number: 70

Clermont Connection Road is a state-controlled regional road (number 551). It connects the Gregory Highway to Clermont–Alpha Road in Clermont, a distance of 2.1 kilometres (1.3 mi). It is signed as part of State Route 70 and has no major intersections.

== See also ==
- List of road routes in Queensland
- List of numbered roads in Queensland
