= Lochington, Queensland =

Lochington
- Suburb
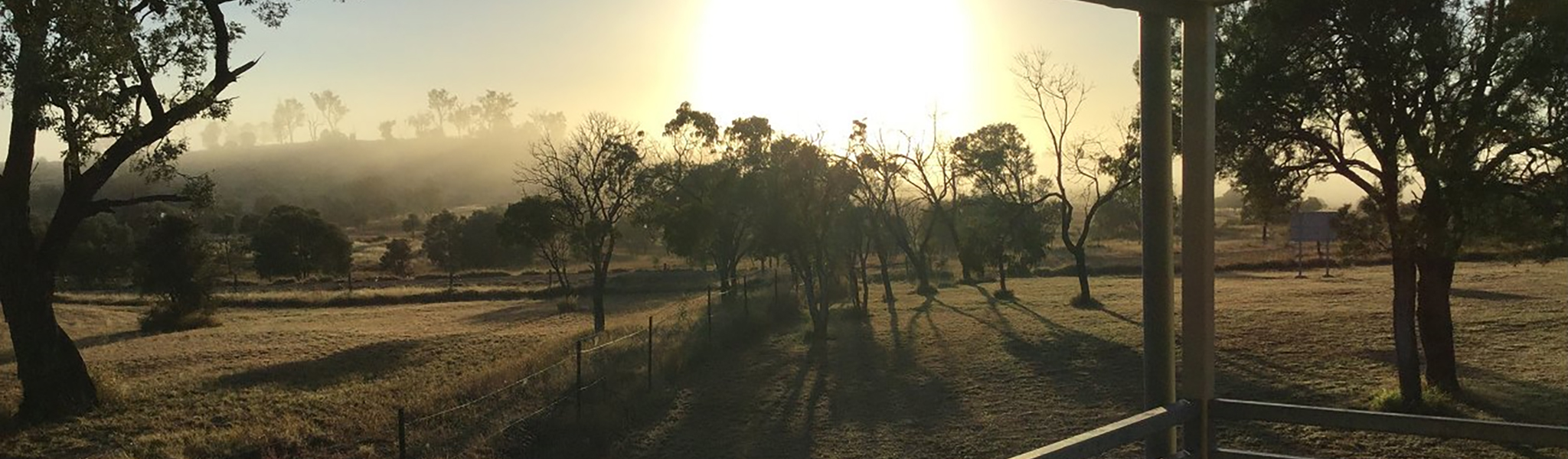
- Lochington sunset, 2025

- Interactive map of Lochington
- Coordinates: 23.9583°S 147.4105°E
- Country: Australia
- State: Queensland
- LGA: Central Highlands Region
- Location: 72.3 km (44.9 mi) NW of Springsure; 122 km (76 mi) SW of Emerald; 392 km (244 mi) W of Rockhampton; 838 km (521 mi) NW of Brisbane

Government
  - State electorate: Gregory
  - Federal division: Flynn

Area
  - Total: 4,455.5 km^{2} (1,720.3 sq mi)
- Elevation: 267 m (876 ft)

Population
  - Total: 128 (2021 census)
  - Density: 0.02873/km^{2} (0.07441/sq mi)
- Time zone: UTC+10:00 (AEST)
- Postcode: 4722
- Mean max temp: 30.1 °C (86.2 °F)
- Mean min temp: 14.8 °C (58.6 °F)
- Annual rainfall: 592.4 mm (23.32 in)
Suburbs around Lochington
Alpha	Willows; Anakie Siding	Gindie
Alpha	Lochington	Minerva
Mantuan Downs	Nandowrie	Cona Creek

Lochington is a rural locality in the Central Highlands Region, Queensland, Australia. In the 2021 census, Lochington had a population of 128 people.

== Geography ==
Lochington is bounded to the east and south-east by the Nogoa River. The locality is within the Fitzroy River drainage basin.

The Capricorn Highway passes through the northernmost part of the locality from Anakie Siding to Willows.

The Snake Range National Park (24.0547°S 147.5947°E) lies within the locality to the east. It is 2,687.7 square kilometres (1,037.7 sq mi).

The predominant land use is grazing on native vegetation.

=== Climate ===
Lochington has a subtropical semi-arid climate (Köppen: BSh) with very hot, somewhat wetter summers and mild, dry winters. The wettest recorded day was 2 June 2012 with 107.2 mm (4.22 in) of rainfall. Extreme temperatures ranged from 45.7 °C (114.3 °F) on 4 January 2014 to −2.6 °C (27.3 °F) on 12 July 2014.

Climate data for Lochington (23.94°S 147.53°E) (267 m (876 ft) AMSL) (2010-2025)
Month	Jan	Feb	Mar	Apr	May	Jun	Jul	Aug	Sep	Oct	Nov	Dec	Year
Record high °C (°F)	45.7 (114.3)	44.0 (111.2)	42.2 (108.0)	36.7 (98.1)	34.1 (93.4)	32.3 (90.1)	31.6 (88.9)	35.2 (95.4)	40.4 (104.7)	40.9 (105.6)	42.8 (109.0)	44.0 (111.2)	45.7 (114.3)
Mean daily maximum °C (°F)	35.0 (95.0)	34.2 (93.6)	33.0 (91.4)	30.0 (86.0)	26.3 (79.3)	23.3 (73.9)	23.4 (74.1)	26.0 (78.8)	29.2 (84.6)	32.7 (90.9)	33.6 (92.5)	34.6 (94.3)	30.1 (86.2)
Mean daily minimum °C (°F)	21.9 (71.4)	21.1 (70.0)	20.0 (68.0)	15.1 (59.2)	10.4 (50.7)	7.5 (45.5)	6.3 (43.3)	7.5 (45.5)	11.4 (52.5)	16.2 (61.2)	19.1 (66.4)	20.7 (69.3)	14.8 (58.6)
Record low °C (°F)	16.6 (61.9)	11.4 (52.5)	12.9 (55.2)	4.7 (40.5)	−0.6 (30.9)	−1.3 (29.7)	−2.6 (27.3)	−1.8 (28.8)	2.7 (36.9)	4.3 (39.7)	9.6 (49.3)	12.2 (54.0)	−2.6 (27.3)
Average precipitation mm (inches)	97.9 (3.85)	86.2 (3.39)	69.5 (2.74)	33.9 (1.33)	13.1 (0.52)	32.1 (1.26)	28.3 (1.11)	19.0 (0.75)	21.6 (0.85)	39.8 (1.57)	57.5 (2.26)	96.8 (3.81)	592.4 (23.32)
Average precipitation days (≥ 0.2 mm)	8.4	9.0	7.9	4.6	3.5	4.0	4.3	2.3	2.9	4.8	7.6	8.6	67.9
Source: Bureau of Meteorology (2010-2025)

== History ==
Lochington pastoral station obtained a mail service on 1 January 1937.

Lockington Provisional School opened 23 January 1961 on land that was once part of Lockington pastoral station, and became Lockington State School at a new site in January 1965. The school closed 14 December 1979 due to low student numbers, but reopened in January 1991, as Lochington State School (a new spelling of the name).

On 17 April 2020, the Queensland Government re-drew the boundaries of localities within the Central Highlands Region by replacing the locality of The Gemfields with three new localities of Rubyvale, Sapphire Central and Anakie Siding (around the towns of Rubyvale, Sapphire, and Anakie respectively). This included adjusting the boundaries of other existing localities in the Region to accommodate these changes; Lochington lost a small portion of land to the north to the new Anakie Siding, lost a strip of land from its north-eastern edge mostly to Gindie but gained a small piece of land from Minerva, with the overall effect of reducing the area of the locality from 4,533.6 to 4,455.5 square kilometres (1,750.4 to 1,720.3 sq mi). As a consequence of these changes, the boundary between Lochington and Minerva/Gindie more closely follows the course of the Nogoa River.

== Demographics ==
In the 2011 census, Lochington's population was deemed to be too low to be reported separately and was combined with neighbouring Willows which had a reported population of 308 people.

At the 2016 census, Lochington had a population of 57 people.

In the 2021 census, Lochington had a population of 128 people.

== Education ==
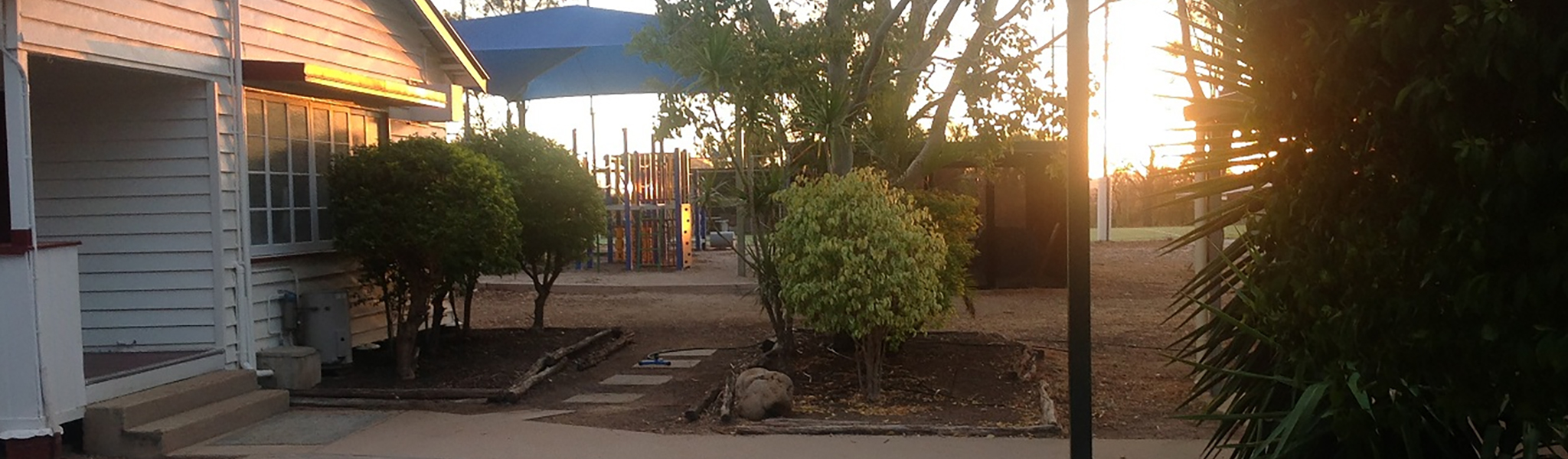
Lochington State School, 2025

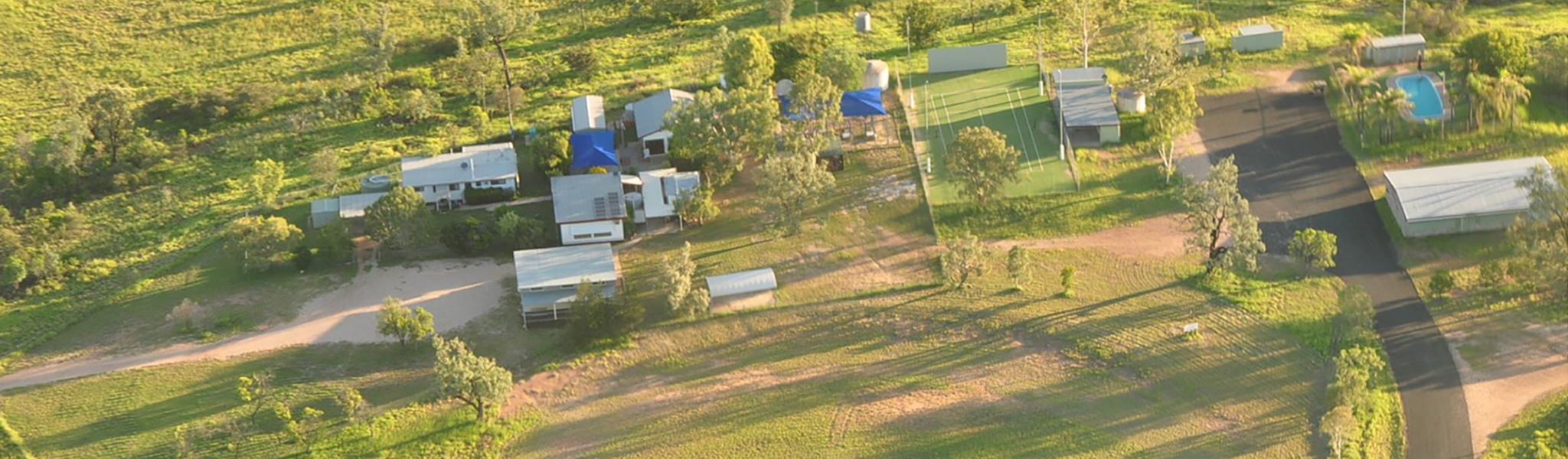
Aerial view of Lochington State School, 2025

Lochington State School is a government co-educational primary (Prep to Year 6) school at the Lochington pastoral homestead at 101 Lochington Access Road (23.9435°S 147.5253°E). In 2013, the school had 3 students (from the same family) and 1 teacher. In 2016, enrolment was 10, in 2017, eight, and in 2018, seven. In 2021, enrolment was six, including three students in their Prep year.

There are no secondary schools in Lochington. The nearest government secondary school is Springsure State School (to Year 10) in Springsure to the east. However, for students in most of Lochington, the distance to Springsure would be too great for a daily commute. Aso, there are no nearby schools offering education to Year 12. The alternatives are distance education and boarding school.
