= Argyll, Queensland =

Argyll
- Suburb
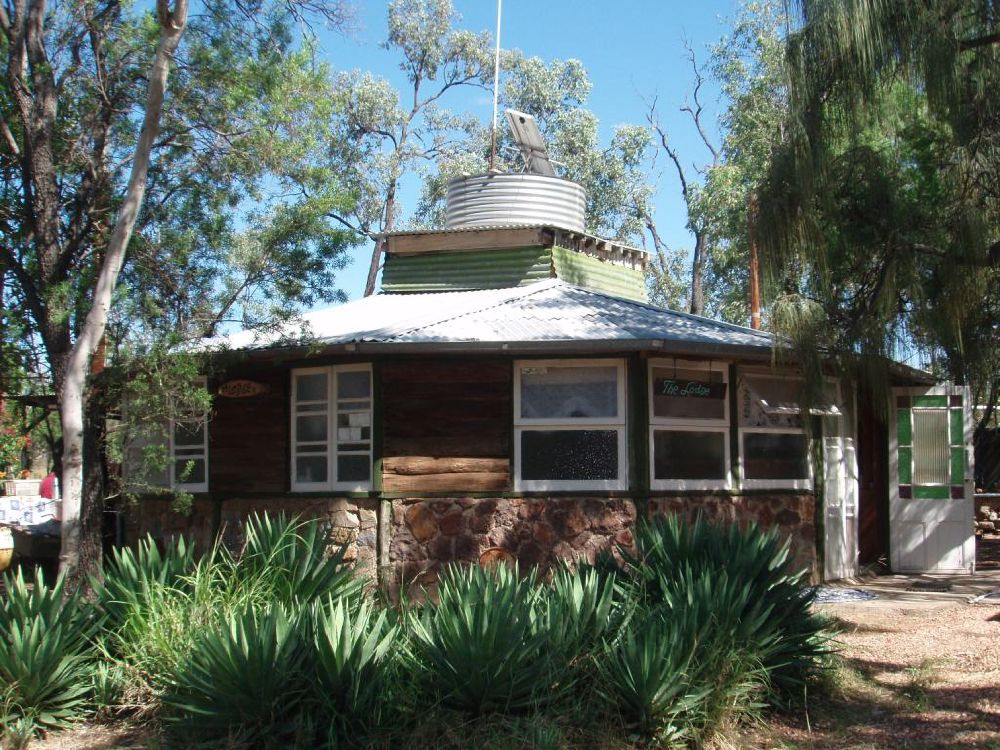
- Tomahawk Creek Huts: The Lodge, 2011

- Interactive map of Argyll
- Coordinates: 23.2691°S 147.5244°E
- Country: Australia
- State: Queensland
- LGA: Central Highlands Region
- Location: 57.9 km (36.0 mi) SW of Capella; 68.3 km (42.4 mi) S of Clermont; 76.6 km (47.6 mi) NW of Emerald; 347 km (216 mi) W of Rockhampton; 906 km (563 mi) NW of Brisbane

Government
  - State electorate: Gregory
  - Federal division: Flynn

Area
  - Total: 629.1 km^{2} (242.9 sq mi)

Population
  - Total: 25 (2021 census)
  - Density: 0.0397/km^{2} (0.1029/sq mi)
- Time zone: UTC+10:00 (AEST)
- Postcode: 4721
Suburbs around Argyll
Peak Vale	Theresa Creek	Theresa Creek
Peak Vale	Argyll	Carbine Creek
Peak Vale	Willows	Rubyvale

Argyll is a rural locality in the Central Highlands Region, Queensland, Australia. In the 2021 census, Argyll had a population of 25 people.

== Geography ==
The Clermont Rubyvale Road enters the locality from the north-east (Theresa Creek) and exits to the south-east (Rubyvale).

Tomahawk Creek rises in Peak Vale to the south-west which follows into the south-west of the locality and then north through the locality, exiting to the north (the locality of Theresa Creek).

Argyll has a number of mountains (from north to south):

Mountain	Coordinates	Height	Ref
Mount Observatory	23.1481°S 147.4243°E	435 metres (1,427 ft)	
Bald Hills	23.2035°S 147.5096°E	380 metres (1,250 ft)	
Chinaman Peak	23.2174°S 147.2988°E	539 metres (1,768 ft)	
Double Point	23.2372°S 147.5328°E	392 metres (1,286 ft)	
Black Mountain	23.2405°S 147.5744°E	417 metres (1,368 ft)	
Mount Mica	23.2810°S 147.5320°E	442 metres (1,450 ft)	
Pigeon Peak	23.2812°S 147.6229°E	360 metres (1,180 ft)	
Mount Dumb Bell	23.2893°S 147.5820°E	419 metres (1,375 ft)	
Mount Zig Zag	23.3135°S 147.3395°E	540 metres (1,770 ft)	
Mount Ball	23.3208°S 147.6598°E	464 metres (1,522 ft)	
Mount Newsome	23.3646°S 147.4733°E	460 metres (1,510 ft)	
Mount Hoy	23.3871°S 147.4196°E	500 metres (1,600 ft)	
Mount Point	23.3971°S 147.4103°E	540 metres (1,770 ft)	
Mount Tabletop	23.4646°S 147.2729°E	520 metres (1,710 ft)	

The land use is grazing on native vegetation.

== History ==
On 17 May 2019, the Queensland Government decided to discontinue the locality of Mistake Creek and absorb its land into the neighbouring localities of Clermont, Laglan, Frankfield and Peak Vale and to extend Peak Vale into the Central Highlands Region by altering the boundaries of Argyll.

On 17 April 2020, the Queensland Government re-drew the boundaries of localities within the Central Highlands Region by replacing the locality of The Gemfields with three new localities of Rubyvale, Sapphire Central and Anakie Siding (around the towns of Rubyvale, Sapphire, and Anakie respectively). This included adjusting the boundaries of other existing localities in the Region to accommodate these changes; Argyll lost its south-eastern corner to become the northern part of the new Rubyvale and the north-eastern part of the new Sapphire Central.

== Demographics ==
In the 2016 census, Argyll had a population of 31 people.

In the 2021 census, Argyll had a population of 25 people.

== Heritage listings ==
Tomahawk Creek Huts is a heritage-listed site in Argyll (23.3659°S 147.4412°E).

== Education ==
There are no schools in Argyll. The nearest government primary schools are Clermont State School in Clermont and Anakie State School in Anakie Siding to the south. The nearest government secondary schools are Clermont State High School in Clermont and Capella State High School in Capella to the north-east. However, students in some parts of Argyll would be too distant to attend these schools; the alternatives are distance education and boarding school.
