= Mantuan Downs, Queensland =

Mantuan Downs
- Suburb
- Interactive map of Mantuan Downs
- Coordinates: 24.5472°S 146.9647°E
- Country: Australia
- State: Queensland
- LGA: Central Highlands Region
- Location: 120 km (75 mi) NE of Tambo; 136 km (85 mi) WSW of Springsure; 203 km (126 mi) SW of Emerald; 470 km (290 mi) WSW of Rockhampton; 901 km (560 mi) NW of Brisbane

Government
  - State electorate: Gregory
  - Federal division: Flynn

Area
  - Total: 2,412.6 km^{2} (931.5 sq mi)

Population
  - Total: 23 (2021 census)
  - Density: 0.00953/km^{2} (0.0247/sq mi)
- Time zone: UTC+10:00 (AEST)
- Postcode: 4722
Suburbs around Mantuan Downs
Alpha	Alpha	Lochington
Windeyer	Mantuan Downs	Nandowrie
Caldervale	Carnarvon Park	Buckland

Mantuan Downs is a rural locality in the Central Highlands Region, Queensland, Australia. In the 2021 census, Mantuan Downs had a population of 23 people.

== Geography ==
The Claude River rises in the north-west of the locality (24.4211°S 146.6781°E) and flows in an easterly direction. The Nogoa River enters the locality from Carnarvon Park to the south (24.7865°S 147.2134°E) and flows in a northeasterly direction, briefly forming part of the locality's eastern boundary before its confluence with its tributary the Claude River on the locality's boundary (24.4090°S 147.3060°E), after which the Nogoa River exits to Nandowrie to the east.

The locality has the following ranges:

- Drummond Range (24.4184°S 146.7585°E)
- Great Dividing Range (24.4579°S 146.62009°E)

and the following mountains and valleys:

- Mount Caroline (24.7316°S 147.2495°E) 565 metres (1,854 ft)
- Mount Vexation (24.6963°S 147.2506°E) 601 metres (1,972 ft)
- Yarra Gorge (24.7744°S 147.2442°E)

The Dawson Developmental Road enters the locality from Nandowrie in the east and continues west, exiting to Windeyer in the west.

== History ==
The locality presumably takes its name from the Mantuan Downs pastoral property established by Thomas Mitchell. Mitchell explored and named the area in July 1846.

In January 2020 the North Australian Pastoral Company announced that it was purchasing the large-scale cattle breeding and finishing property named Mantuan Downs. The 134,000-hectare (330,000-acre) property consists of two pastoral leases, known as Mantuan Downs and Castlevale, as well as the freehold Semper Idem.

== Demographics ==
In the 2016 census, Mantuan Downs had a population of 31 people.

In the 2021 census, Mantuan Downs had a population of 23 people.

== Economy ==
There are a number of homesteads in the locality:

- Albeni (24.5787°S 147.0723°E)
- Beaucamp (24.4816°S 147.2522°E)
- Castlevale (24.4924°S 146.8669°E)
- Cungelella (24.6831°S 147.1782°E)
- Goodliffe (24.6472°S 147.0455°E)
- Mantuan Downs (24.4128°S 147.2466°E)
- Mount Vexation (24.6882°S 147.1978°E)
- Semper Idem (24.4495°S 147.2151°E)

== Transport ==
There are a number of airstrips in the locality:

- Castlevale airstrip #1 (24.5746°S 147.0823°E)
- Castlevale airstrip #2 (24.4703°S 146.9536°E)
- Goodliffe airstrip (24.6472°S 147.0411°E)
- Mantuan Downs airstrip (24.4105°S 147.2456°E)
- Yandaburra airstrip (24.7034°S 147.1806°E)

== Education ==
There are no schools in Mantuan Downs. The nearest government primary school is Tresswell State School in Nandowrie, but it has been closed temporarily since February 2020, and there are no other nearby primary schools. There are no nearby secondary schools. The alternatives are distance learning and boarding schools.
