= Gindie =

- Suburb
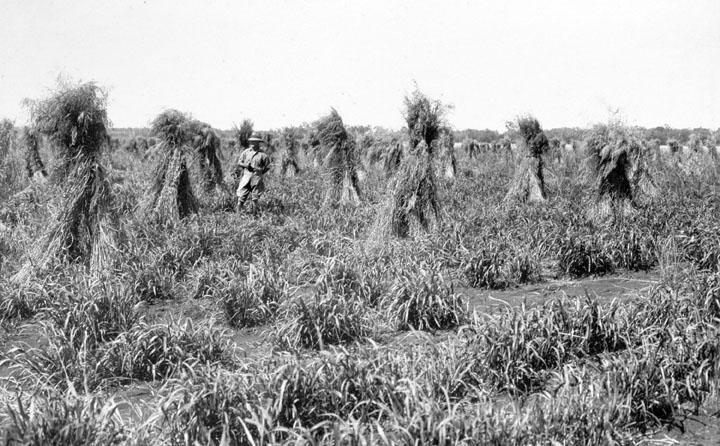
- Sudan grass in stook, State Farm, Gindie, circa 1933

- Interactive map of Gindie
- Coordinates: 23.7691°S 148.1313°E
- Country: Australia
- State: Queensland
- LGA: Central Highlands Region
- Location: 23.5 km (14.6 mi) S of Emerald; 290 km (180 mi) WSW of Rockhampton; 809 km (503 mi) NW of Brisbane

Government
  - State electorate: Gregory
  - Federal division: Flynn

Area
  - Total: 1,335.3 km^{2} (515.6 sq mi)

Population
  - Total: 232 (2021 census)
  - Density: 0.1737/km^{2} (0.4500/sq mi)
- Time zone: UTC+10:00 (AEST)
- Postcode: 4702
Suburbs around Gindie
Anakie Siding	Emerald	Comet
Lochington	Gindie	Comet
Lochington	Minerva	Arcturus

Gindie is a rural locality in the Central Highlands Region, Queensland, Australia. In the 2021 census, Gindie had a population of 232 people.

== Geography ==
The settlement of Fernlees is located in southern Gindie (23.8567°S 148.1250°E).

The Gregory Highway passes through the locality from north (Emerald) to south (Minerva) passing through the town of Fernlees. The Blackwater railway line passes through the locality parallel and immediately east of the highway with a railway siding at Fernlees (23.8556°S 148.1242°E).

== History ==
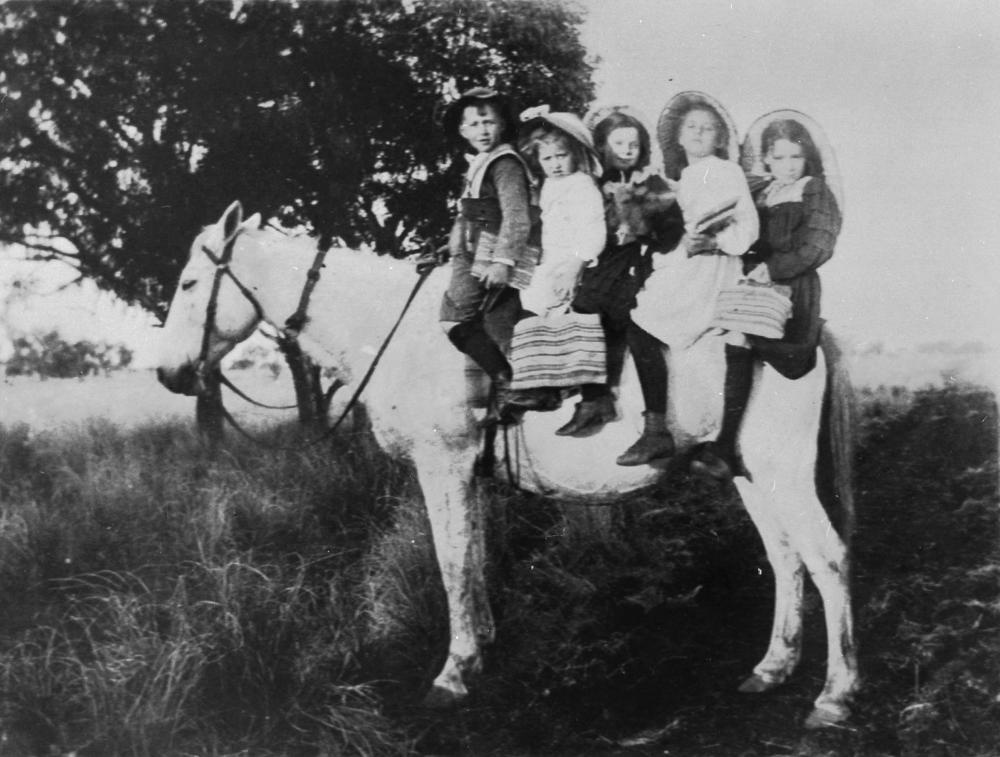
Daniels children going to school on horseback, 1900-1910

The name Gindie means "much brigalow".

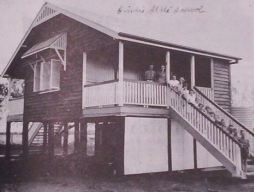
Early school building, Gindie State School

Gindie Provisional School (also known as Gindie Siding Provisional School) opened 12 November 1897 with 25 students under head teacher Miss Mary E. Hamilton. It became Gindie State School on 1 January 1909. The school closed in 1949 but later reopened. In 1965, the school moved to a new site using a demountable building until a permanent building was completed in 1970.

The Gindie State Farm was established In 1898 to experiment with growing new kinds of crops in the district such as sorghum, maize and pumpkins. The farm closed in 1932.

Fernlees State School opened on 20 September 1951 and closed in 1953. It was on a 2-acre (0.81 ha) site off to the west the Gregory Highway north of the town (approx 23.8479°S 148.1214°E).

Fernlees Methodist Church was established in 1959 at 2780 Gregory Highway (23.8564°S 148.1252°E). Following the amalgamation of the Methodist Church into the Uniting Church in Australia in 1977, it became the Fernlees Uniting Church. It closed in 2007. It is now a private residence.

On 17 April 2020, the Queensland Government re-drew the boundaries of localities within the Central Highlands Region by replacing the locality of The Gemfields with three new localities of Rubyvale, Sapphire Central and Anakie Siding (around the towns of Rubyvale, Sapphire, and Anakie respectively). This included adjusting the boundaries of other existing localities in the Region to accommodate these changes; Gindie gaining the south-eastern corner of The Gemfields and gaining the eastern edge of Lochington, but losing a small area of its northern part and a small area from its north-east part to Anakie Siding, increasing the area of the locality from 1,293.4 to 1,335.3 square kilometres (499.4 to 515.6 sq mi). As a consequence of these changes, Lake Maraboon is now entirely within the north-west of Gindie and the boundary between Lochington and Minerva/Gindie more closely follows the course of the Nogoa River.

== Demographics ==
In the 2011 census, Gindie had a population of 382 people.

In the 2016 census, Gindie had a population of 209 people.

In the 2021 census, Gindie had a population of 232 people.

== Education ==
Gindie State School is a government primary (Prep-6) school for boys and girls at 14 Old Cullen-la-ringo Road (corner of Gregory Highway, 23.7242°S 148.1408°E). In 2013, the school had an enrolment of 40 students in two classes, P-2 and 3-7, with 3 teachers (2 full-time equivalent). In 2018, the school had an enrolment of 35 students with 4 teachers (3 full-time equivalent) and 8 non-teaching staff (2 full-time equivalent).

Camp Fairbairn Outdoor Education Centre is an Outdoor and Environmental Education Centre at Fairbairn Dam (23.6645°S 148.0920°E). It has a principal, 3 teachers and 3 non-teaching staff. It offers basic residential accommodation and outdoor programs for students from Prep to Year 12.

There is are no secondary schools in Gindie. The nearest government secondary school is Emerald State High School in neighbouring Emerald to the north.
