= Willows Gemfields =

- Town
- Coordinates: 23.7392°S 147.5400°E
- Country: Australia
- State: Queensland
- LGA: Central Highlands Region
- Location: 39 km (24 mi) SW of Anakie; 82 km (51 mi) WSW of Emerald, Queensland; 352 km (219 mi) W of Rockhampton; 875 km (544 mi) NW of Brisbane

Government
  - State electorate: Gregory
  - Federal division: Flynn

Population
  - Total: 101 (2021 census)
- Time zone: UTC+10:00 (AEST)
- Postcode: 4702
- Gazetted: 1 October 1979

Willows Gemfields is a rural town in the locality of Willows in the Central Highlands Region of Queensland, Australia. In the 2021 census, the town of Willows Gemfields had a population of 101 people.

Sapphires are mined around the town.

== History ==
The town was named on 1 October 1979.

== Demographics ==
In the 2011 census, the town of Willows Gemfields had a population of 108 people.

In the 2016 census, the town of Willows Gemfields had a population of 114 people.

In the 2021 census, the town of Willows Gemfields had a population of 101 people.

== Education ==
There are no schools in Willows Gemfields. The nearest government primary school is Anakie State School in Anakie Siding to the north-east. The nearest government secondary school is Emerald State High School in Emerald to the east.
