= Buckland, Queensland =

Buckland
- Suburb
- Interactive map of Buckland
- Coordinates: 24.5672°S 147.5594°E
- Country: Australia
- State: Queensland
- LGA: Central Highlands Region
- Location: 45.7 km (28.4 mi) S of Nandowrie; 90.1 km (56.0 mi) SW of Springsure; 158 km (98 mi) SSW of Emerald; 425 km (264 mi) WSW of Rockhampton; 853 km (530 mi) NW of Brisbane

Government
  - State electorate: Gregory
  - Federal division: Flynn

Area
  - Total: 1,770.9 km^{2} (683.7 sq mi)

Population
  - Total: 43 (2021 census)
  - Density: 0.02428/km^{2} (0.0629/sq mi)
- Time zone: UTC+10:00 (AEST)
- Postcode: 4722
Suburbs around Buckland
Nandowrie	Nandowrie	Cona Creek
Mantuan Downs	Buckland	Wealwandangie
Carnarvon Park	Carnarvon Park	Carnarvon Park

Buckland is a rural locality in the Central Highlands Region, Queensland, Australia. In the 2021 census, Buckland had a population of 43 people.

== Geography ==
Buckland Creek rises in Carnarvon Park to the south-east and flows through Buckland, exiting to the north-west (Nandowrie) where it becomes a tributary of the Nogoa River.

Buckland has the following mountains:

- Mount Sunday in the east of the locality (24.5567°S 147.7783°E) rising to 780 metres (2,560 ft) above sea level
- Racehorse Mountain in the north-east of the locality (24.4892°S 147.6974°E) 515 metres (1,690 ft)

The land use is predominantly grazing on native vegetation with some crop growing, mostly near Buckland Creek.

== Demographics ==
In the 2016 census, Buckland had a population of 44 people.

In the 2021 census, Buckland had a population of 43 people.

== Education ==
There are no schools in Buckland. The nearest government primary school is Tresswell State School in neighbouring Nandowrie to the north; however, due to the distance for a daily commute, not all students in Buckland would be able to attend the school. Also, there are no secondary schools nearby. The alternatives are distance education and boarding school.
