= Nandowrie, Queensland =

Nandowrie
- Suburb
- Interactive map of Nandowrie
- Coordinates: 24.3244°S 147.5177°E
- Country: Australia
- State: Queensland
- LGA: Central Highlands Region
- Location: 65.8 km (40.9 mi) WSW of Springsure; 134 km (83 mi) SW of Emerald; 400 km (250 mi) WSW of Rockhampton; 830 km (520 mi) NW of Brisbane

Government
  - State electorate: Gregory
  - Federal division: Flynn

Area
  - Total: 697.3 km^{2} (269.2 sq mi)

Population
  - Total: 31 (2021 census)
  - Density: 0.0445/km^{2} (0.1151/sq mi)
- Time zone: UTC+10:00 (AEST)
- Postcode: 4722
Suburbs around Nandowrie
| Lochington | Lochington | Cona Creek |
| Mantuan Downs | Nandowrie | Cona Creek |
| Mantuan Downs | Buckland | Buckland |

Nandowrie is a rural locality in the Central Highlands Region, Queensland, Australia. In the 2021 census, Nandowrie had a population of 31 people.

== Geography ==
The Nogoa River forms the northern boundary of the locality. The Dawson Developmental Road passes through it from north-east (Cona Creek) to south-west (Mantuan Downs). The northern and south-western parts of the locality are flatter, approximately 300 metres (980 ft) above sea level, and are used primarily for cattle grazing. The other parts are more mountainous rising to unnamed peaks of approximately 400 metres (1,300 ft) above sea level; this land is currently undeveloped, with the majority of it being within the Squire State Forest and Nandowrie State Forest.

== History ==
The origin of the name Nandowrie may be the Nandowrie Lagoon on the road from Springsure to Tambo.

Tresswell State School opened on 25 January 1971 on the pastoral property "Tresswell". In March 1974, the school moved to a new building in its current location. It celebrated its 40th birthday in 2011.

== Demographics ==
In the 2016 census, Nandowrie had a population of 45 people.

In the 2021 census, Nandowrie had a population of 31 people.

== Education ==
Tresswell State School is a government primary (Prep-6) school at 5469 Dawson Developmental Road (also known as Tambo Road, 24.2479°S 147.6065°E). It is 56 kilometres (35 mi) from Springsure. The road runs for 245 kilometres (152 mi) between Springsure and Tambo, yet the school has the only buildings adjacent to it. It is a one-teacher school with students drawn from local cattle properties. In 2018, it had no students, the numbers having dwindled from 6 in 2015 and 4 in 2017. However, there were pre-school children in the district who were likely to attend the school in future years, so the school was only closed temporarily. As at 2022, the school has no students and is officially "open" but "not currently operational".

There is no secondary schooling in the locality. The nearest government secondary school is Springsure State School (to Year 10) in Springsure to the north. There are no nearby schools offering education to Year 12; the alternatives are distance education and boarding school.
