= Peak Vale, Queensland =

Peak Vale
- Suburb
- Interactive map of Peak Vale
- Coordinates: 23.1058°S 147.1480°E
- Country: Australia
- State: Queensland
- LGAs: Isaac Region; Central Highlands Region
- Location: 77.0 km (47.8 mi) WSW of Clermont; 195 km (121 mi) SW of Moranbah; 365 km (227 mi) SW of Mackay; 455 km (283 mi) WNW of Rockhampton; 1,016 km (631 mi) NW of Brisbane

Government
  - State electorates: Burdekin; Gregory
  - Federal divisions: Capricornia; Flynn

Area
  - Total: 816.8 km^{2} (315.4 sq mi)

Population
  - Total: 39 (2016 census)
  - Density: 0.0477/km^{2} (0.1237/sq mi)
- Time zone: UTC+10:00 (AEST)
- Postcode: 4721
Suburbs around Peak Vale
Clermont	Clermont	Theresa Creek
Quetta	Peak Vale	Argyll
Alpha	Willows	Willows

Peak Vale is a rural locality split between the Isaac Region and the Central Highlands Region, Queensland, Australia. In the 2016 census, Peak Vale had a population of 39 people, but its boundaries were altered subsequently and its population was not separately reported in the 2021 census.

== Geography ==
The locality is bounded to the west by the Drummond Range.

There are a number of named peaks in the locality (from north to south):

- Chinaman Peak (23.2174°S 147.2988°E) 539 metres (1,768 ft)
- Mount Zig Zag (23.3135°S 147.3395°E) 540 metres (1,770 ft)
- Mount Tabletop (23.4646°S 147.2729°E) 520 metres (1,710 ft)

The Carbine State Forest is in the north of the locality. Apart from that protected area, the land use is predominantly grazing on native vegetation in most of the locality, but in the southern more mountainous part of the locality, there is no active land use.

== History ==
On 17 May 2019, it was decided to discontinue the locality of Mistake Creek and absorb its land into the neighbouring localities of Clermont, Laglan, Frankfield and Peak Vale and to extend Peak Vale into the Central Highlands Region by altering the boundaries of Argyll.

== Demographics ==
In the 2016 census, Peak Vale had a population of 39 people.

In the 2021 census, the population of Peak Vale was not separately reported, but included within the reporting of the population of neighbouring Clermont and Alpha.

== Education ==
There are no schools in Peak Vale. Students living in the north of Peak Vale would be able to attend Clermont State School and Clermont State High School in neighbouring Clermont to the north. However, those schools would be too distant for a daily commute for students living in the southern parts of the locality. The alternatives are distance education and boarding school.
