= Fernlees =

Fernlees Gindie, Queensland
- Coordinates: 23.8566°S 148.125°E
- Postcode(s): 4702
- Time zone: AEST (UTC+10:00)
- Location: 15.2 km (9 mi) SSW of Gindie; 30.1 km (19 mi) NNE of Springsure; 38.7 km (24 mi) SSW of Emerald; 305 km (190 mi) WSW of Rockhampton; 794 km (493 mi) NW of Brisbane
- LGA(s): Central Highlands Region
- State electorate(s): Gregory
- Federal division(s): Flynn

Fernlees is a rural town in the locality of Gindie, Central Highlands Region, Queensland, Australia.

== Geography ==
The Gregory Highway passes north-south through the town.

== History ==
Fernlees railway station (23.8554°S 148.1241°E) was on the Springsure railway branch line which opened on 15 August 1887.

Fernlees State School opened on 20 September 1951 and closed in 1953. It was on a 2-acre (0.81 ha) site off to the west the Gregory Highway north of the town (approx 23.8479°S 148.1214°E).

Fernlees Methodist Church was established in 1959 at 2780 Gregory Highway (23.8564°S 148.1252°E). Following the amalgamation of the Methodist Church into the Uniting Church in Australia in 1977, it became the Fernlees Uniting Church. It closed in 2007. It is now a private residence.

== Education ==
There are no schools in Fernlees. The nearest government primary school is Gindie State School in Gindie to the north. The nearest government secondary schools are Springsure State School (to Year 10) in Springsure to the south and Emerald State High School (to Year 12) in Emerald to the north.
