= Willows, Queensland =

Willows
- Suburb
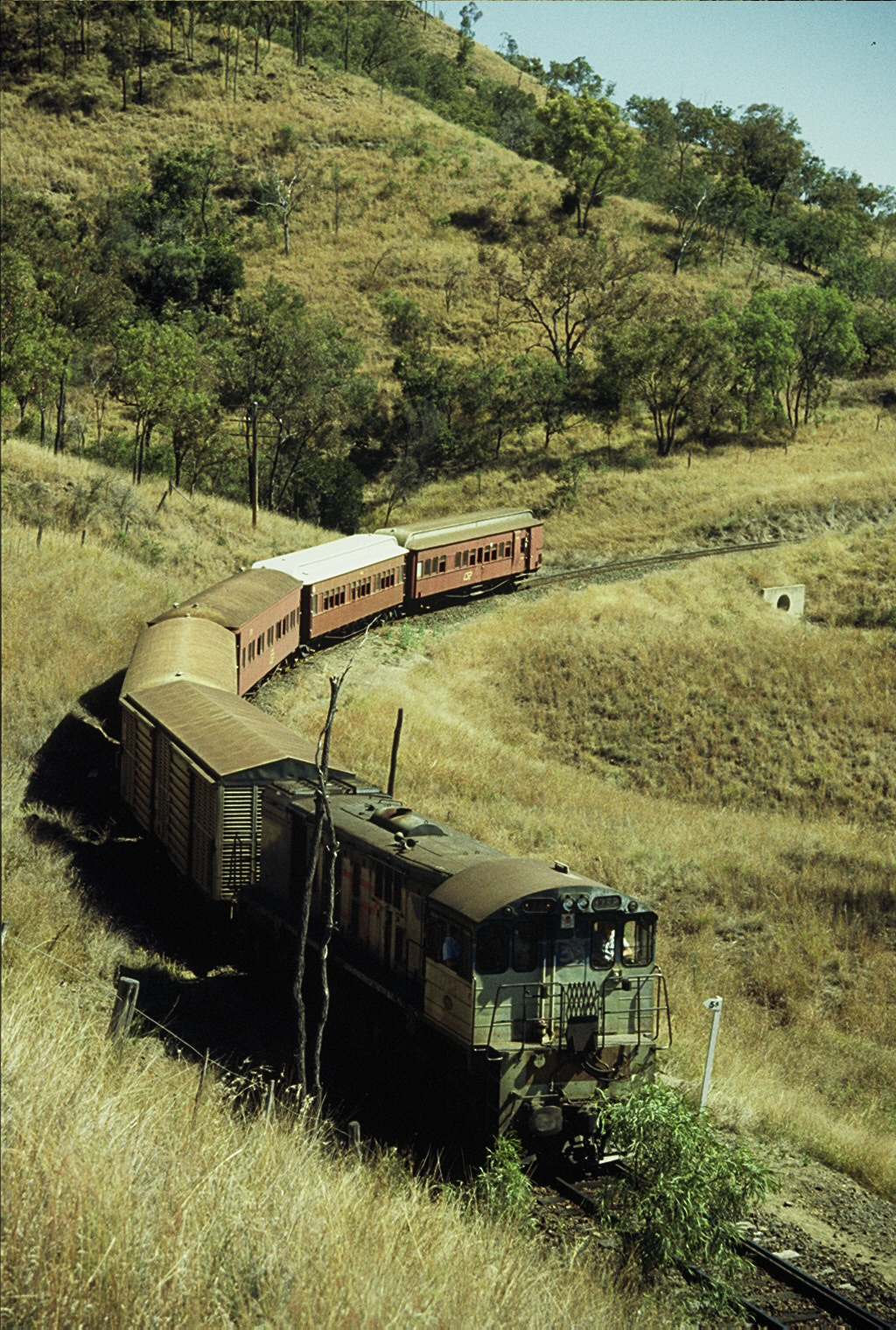
- Train on the Central Western line near Bogantungan, September 1989

- Interactive map of Willows
- Coordinates: 23.5738°S 147.4161°E
- Country: Australia
- State: Queensland
- LGA: Central Highlands Region
- Location: 28.4 km (17.6 mi) SW of Anakie; 70.7 km (43.9 mi) WSW of Emerald; 97.5 km (60.6 mi) E of Alpha; 341 km (212 mi) W of Rockhampton; 903 km (561 mi) NW of Brisbane

Government
  - State electorate: Gregory
  - Federal divisions: Flynn; Maranoa

Area
  - Total: 1,209.8 km^{2} (467.1 sq mi)

Population
  - Total: 139 (2021 census)
  - Density: 0.1149/km^{2} (0.2976/sq mi)
- Time zone: UTC+10:00 (AEST)
- Postcode: 4702
Suburbs around Willows
Peak Vale	Argyll	Rubyvale
Alpha	Willows	Anakie Siding
Alpha	Lochington	Lochington

Willows is a rural locality in the Central Highlands Region, Queensland, Australia. In the 2021 census, Willows had a population of 139 people.

== Geography ==
The town of Bogantungan is within the west of the locality (23.65°S 147.29°E).

The town of Willows Gemfields is the centre of the locality (23.74°S 147.54°E).

The town of Withersfield is within the east of locality (23.5789°S 147.5622°E).

The Central Western railway enters the locality from the east (Anakie Siding/Lochington), passes through the town of Bogantungan, and exits to the west (Alpha). The locality is served by the following stations (from west to east):

- Bogantungan railway station, serving the town of Bogantungan (23.6486°S 147.2902°E)
- Kanoloo railway station, now abandoned (23.6678°S 147.3144°E)
- Willows railway station (23.6568°S 147.4762°E)
- Withersfield railway station, serving the former town of Withersfield, now abandoned (23.5790°S 147.5647°E)

== History ==
In October 1880, 105 town lots were offered for sale in the Town of Withersfield.

Bogantungan State School opened on 19 March 1883. It closed on 11 August 1972. It was on Jackson Street (23.6501°S 147.2875°E).

Withersfield Provisional School opened circa 1886 but closed the same year. A new Withersfield State School opened in 1920. On Saturday 9 December 1922, the school burned down after a school picnic and dance evening the previous day. The school closed circa 1942. It was located north of the town of Withersfield on a 5-acre-2-rood-11-perch (2.25 ha) site at approx 23.5757°S 147.5643°E. Nothing remains of the town today.

== Demographics ==
In the 2016 census, Willows had a population of 144 people.

In the 2021 census, Willows had a population of 139 people.

== Education ==
There are no schools in Willows. The nearest government primary schools are Anakie State School in neighbouring Anakie Siding to the east, Lochington State School in neighbouring Lochington to the south, and Alpha State School in neighbouring Alpha to the west. The nearest government secondary schools are Alpha State School (to Year 10) and Emerald State High School (to Year 12) in Emerald to the east. However, these secondary schools may be too distant for daily commuting with distance education and boarding schools as other options.
