= Quetta, Queensland =

Quetta
- Suburb
- Interactive map of Quetta
- Coordinates: 23.1611°S 147.0180°E
- Country: Australia
- State: Queensland
- LGA: Isaac Region
- Location: 99.8 km (62.0 mi) WSW of Clermont; 207 km (129 mi) NW of Emerald; 264 km (164 mi) SW of Moranbah; 397 km (247 mi) SW of Mackay; 1,101 km (684 mi) NW of Brisbane
- Established: 16 February 2018

Government
  - State electorate: Burdekin
  - Federal division: Capricornia

Area
  - Total: 1,300.7 km^{2} (502.2 sq mi)
- Time zone: UTC+10:00 (AEST)
- Postcode: 4724
Suburbs around Quetta
Clermont	Clermont	Clermont
Alpha	Quetta	Peak Vale
Alpha	Alpha	Peak Vale

Quetta is a rural locality in the Isaac Region, Queensland, Australia.

== Geography ==
The Clermont-Alpha Road runs through from north-east to west.

The predominant land use is grazing on native vegetation.

== History ==
The name Quetta comes from the Quetta parish.

The locality was created on 16 February 2018 by excising land from the localities of Mistake Creek and Peak Vale.

== Education ==
There are no schools in Quetta. The nearest government primary school is Mistake Creek State School in neighbouring Clermont to the north-east. However, it would be too distant for a daily commute for students living in the south of Quetta. There are no secondary schools near Quetta. The alternatives are distance education and boarding school.

== Demographics ==
In the 2021 census, the population of Quetta was not separately reported, but included within the reporting of the population of neighbouring Clermont and Alpha.
