= The Gemfields =

The Gemfields Queensland
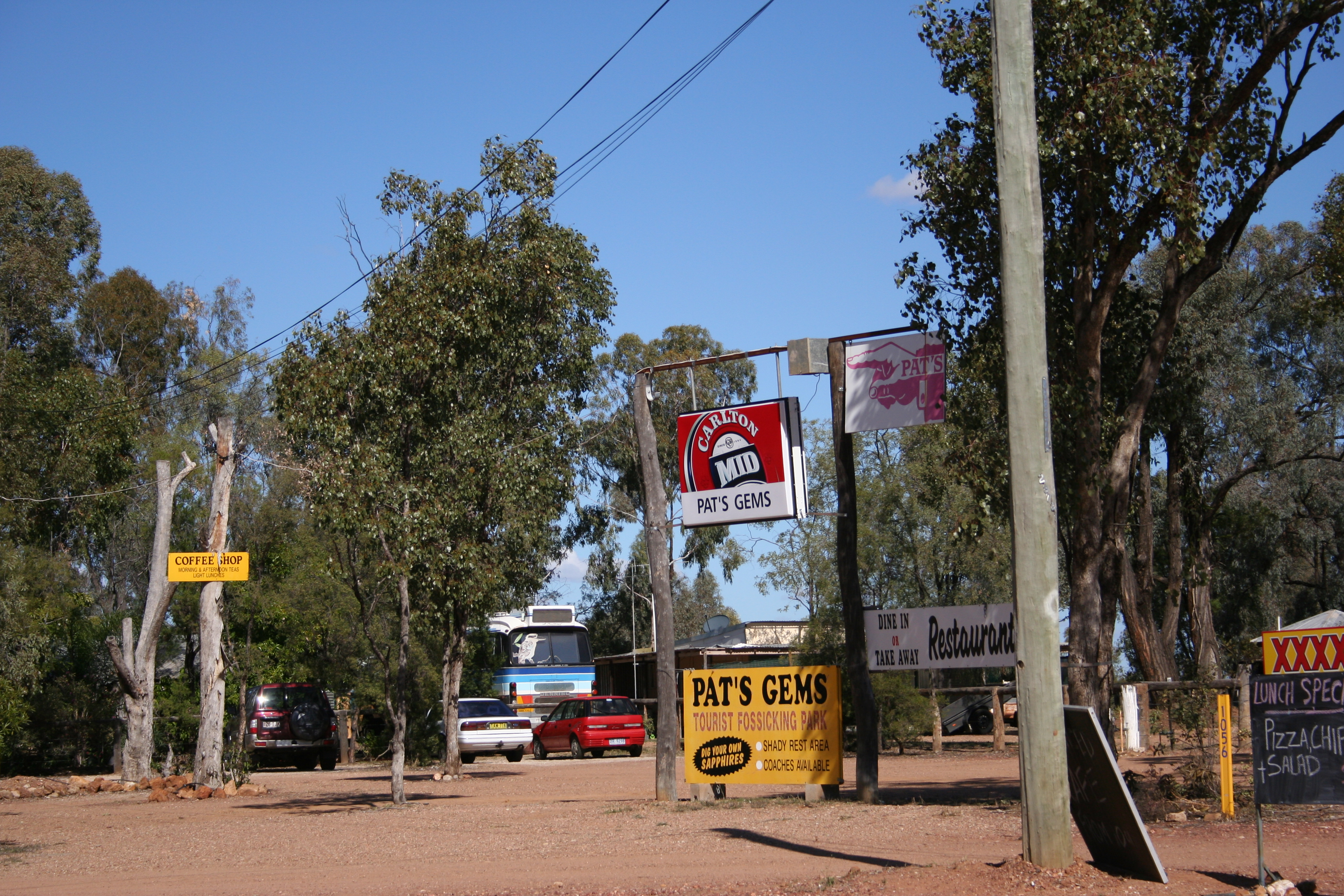
- Rubyvale, one of towns in The Gemfields

- Coordinates: 23.5425°S 147.8108°E
- Population: 1,449 (2016 census)
  - Density: 1.3444/km^{2} (3.4820/sq mi)
- Gazetted: 13 August 2010
- Postcode(s): 4702
- Area: 1,077.8 km^{2} (416.1 sq mi)
- Time zone: AEST (UTC+10:00)
- Location: 60.8 km (38 mi) WNW of Emerald; 331 km (206 mi) W of Rockhampton; 892 km (554 mi) NW of Brisbane
- LGA(s): Central Highlands Region
- State electorate(s): Gregory
- Federal division(s): Flynn
Suburbs around The Gemfields:
Argyll	Fork Lagoons	Fork Lagoons
Willows	The Gemfields	Emerald
Lochington	Lochington	Gindie

The Gemfields is a former locality in the Central Highlands Region, Queensland, Australia. In the 2016 census, The Gemfields had a population of 1,449 people.

On 17 April 2020, the Queensland Government re-drew the boundaries of localities within the Central Highlands Region by removing the locality of The Gemfields in order to create three new localities of Rubyvale, Sapphire Central and Anakie Siding (around the towns of Rubyvale, Sapphire, and Anakie respectively).

== Geography ==
The locality contained three small towns: Anakie, Rubyvale, and Sapphire.

The nearest major town was Emerald.

The Western railway line passed through the locality from east (Emerald) to west (Willows). There was a railway station at Anakie (23.5528°S 147.7453°E) and a railway siding at Taroborah (23.5414°S 147.9450°E).

As the name suggested, the main industry in The Gemfields was sapphire mining, supported by tourism.

== History ==
Anakie Provisional School opened on 27 July 1885. It became Anakie State School on 1 January 1909. Due to low attendances it opened and closed at times, but continues to operate to the present day.

Taraborah Provisional School (also written as Taroborah) opened in 1900. On 1 July 1909 it became Taraborah State School. It closed on 1911.

On 17 April 2020, the Queensland Government re-drew the boundaries of localities within the Central Highlands Region by discontinuing the locality of The Gemfields in order to create three new localities of Rubyvale, Sapphire Central and Anakie Siding (around the towns of Rubyvale, Sapphire, and Anakie respectively).:

== Demographics ==
In the 2011 census, The Gemfields had a population of 1,630.

In the 2016 census, The Gemfields had a population of 1,449 people.

== Amenities ==
The Central Highlands Regional Council operated a public library at 7 Burridge Road, Rubyvale.

== Education ==
Anakie State School is a government primary (Prep-6) school for boys and girls at Cook Street, Anakie (23.5540°S 147.7458°E). In 2017, the school had an enrolment of 83 students with 7 teachers (6 full-time equivalent) and 7 non-teaching staff (4 full-time equivalent). In 2018, the school had an enrolment of 77 students with 7 teachers (6 full-time equivalent) and 9 non-teaching staff (5 full-time equivalent).

There were no secondary schools in The Gemfields. The nearest government secondary school was Emerald State High School in Emerald to the east.

== Events ==
GemFest was an annual festival in the region, attracting large numbers of visitors.

== See also ==
- Geology of Australia
