= Surbiton, Queensland =

Surbiton Queensland
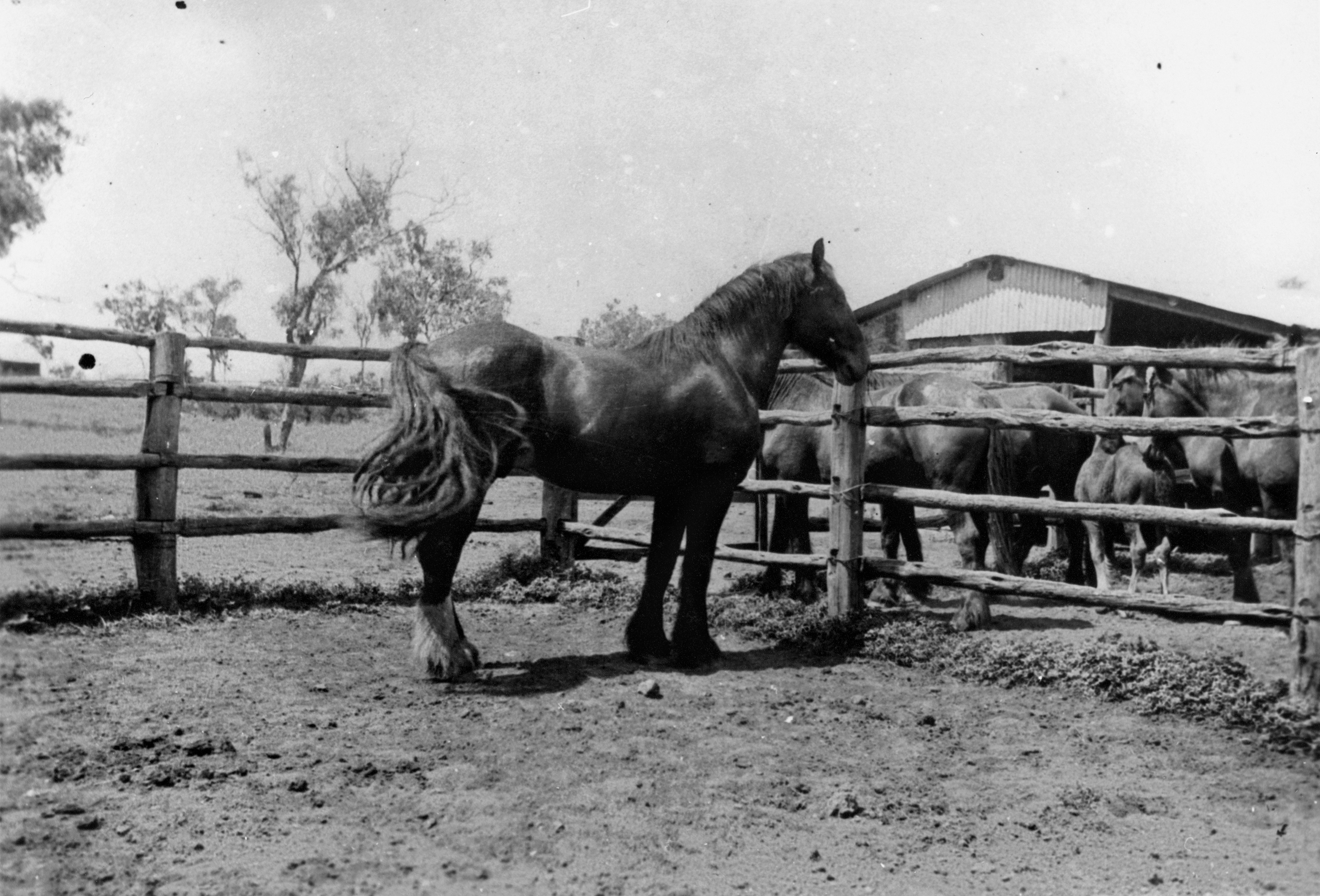
- Horses at Surbiton Station, circa 1940

- Coordinates: 23.1386°S 146.6544°E
- Population: 80 (2016 census)
  - Density: 0.0368/km^{2} (0.095/sq mi)
- Postcode(s): 4724
- Area: 2,171.5 km^{2} (838.4 sq mi)
- Time zone: AEST (UTC+10:00)
- Location: 66.5 km (41 mi) N of Alpha; 126 km (78 mi) WSW of Clermont; 206 km (128 mi) ENE of Barcaldine; 540 km (336 mi) W of Rockhampton; 1,067 km (663 mi) NW of Brisbane
- LGA(s): Barcaldine Region
- State electorate(s): Gregory
- Federal division(s): Maranoa
Suburbs around Surbiton:
Dunrobin	Laglan	Clermont
Hobartville	Surbiton	Quetta
Hobartville	Alpha	Beaufort

Surbiton is a former rural locality in the Barcaldine Region, Queensland, Australia. In the 2016 census, Surbiton had a population of 80 people.

On 22 November 2019, the Queensland Government decided to amalgamate the localities in the Barcaldine Region, resulting in five expanded localities based on the larger towns: Alpha, Aramac, Barcaldine, Jericho and Muttaburra. Surbiton was incorporated into Alpha.

== Geography ==
The Belyando River forms the north-western boundary of the locality. Native Companion Creek flows from the south-west (Alpha/Beaufort) through to the north of the locality where it becomes a tributary of the Belyando River.

The Alpha Clermont Road passes through the locality from the south (Alpha) to the north-west (Quetta).

The principal land use is grazing on native vegetation.

== History ==
The origin of the name is unclear but there has been a Surbiton pastoral run since at least 1866 when it was operated by William Killgour, who came to the colony of New South Wales from London in 1856. It may have been named for Surbiton in London.

== Education ==
There are no schools in Surbiton. There is a primary and secondary school in neighbouring Alpha, but only to Year 10. For Years 11 and 12 of secondary schooling, the nearest schools are in Clermont, Barcaldine and Emerald. Boarding schools and distance education are other options.
