= Mistake Creek, Queensland =

Mistake Creek Queensland
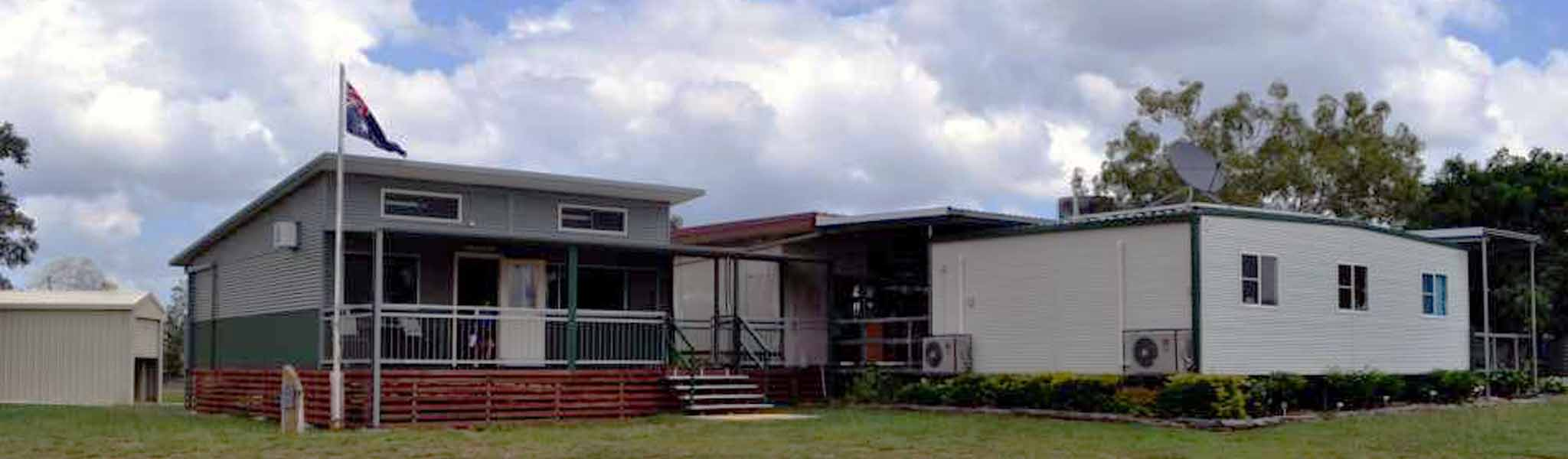
- Mistake Creek State School

- Coordinates: 22.7519°S 146.9208°E
- Population: 38 (2016 census)
  - Density: 0.01311/km^{2} (0.0339/sq mi)
- Area: 2,899.6 km^{2} (1,119.5 sq mi)
- Time zone: AEST (UTC+10:00)
- LGA(s): Isaac Region
- State electorate(s): Burdekin
- Federal division(s): Capricornia
Suburbs around Mistake Creek:
Elgin	Frankfield	Clermont
Surbiton	Mistake Creek	Clermont
Surbiton	Quetta	Peak Vale

Mistake Creek is a former rural locality in Isaac Region, Queensland, Australia. In the 2016 census, Mistake Creek had a population of 38 people.

On 17 May 2019, it was decided to discontinue the locality and absorb its land into the neighbouring localities of Clermont, Laglan, Frankfield and Peak Vale.

== History ==
The district takes its name from Mistake Creek, a tributary of the Belyando River, which was so named after Jerimiah Rolfe, an early local settler, believed his station to be on that river but later discovered it was on a tributary, which he named Mistake Creek.

Mistake Creek State School opened on 24 January 1983.

== Education ==
Mistake Creek State School is a government primary (Prep-6) school for boys and girls at 6652 Alpha Road (22.9889°S 147.0833°E). In 2017, the school had an enrolment of 14 students with 2 teachers and 2 non-teaching staff (1 full-time equivalent). Following the absorption of the locality of Mistake Creek into neighbouring localities in May 2019, the school is now within the locality of Clermont.

== Amenities ==
There are other local organisations including Mistake Creek Progress Association and the Mistake Creek Playgroup.
