= Rubyvale, Queensland =

Rubyvale
- Town
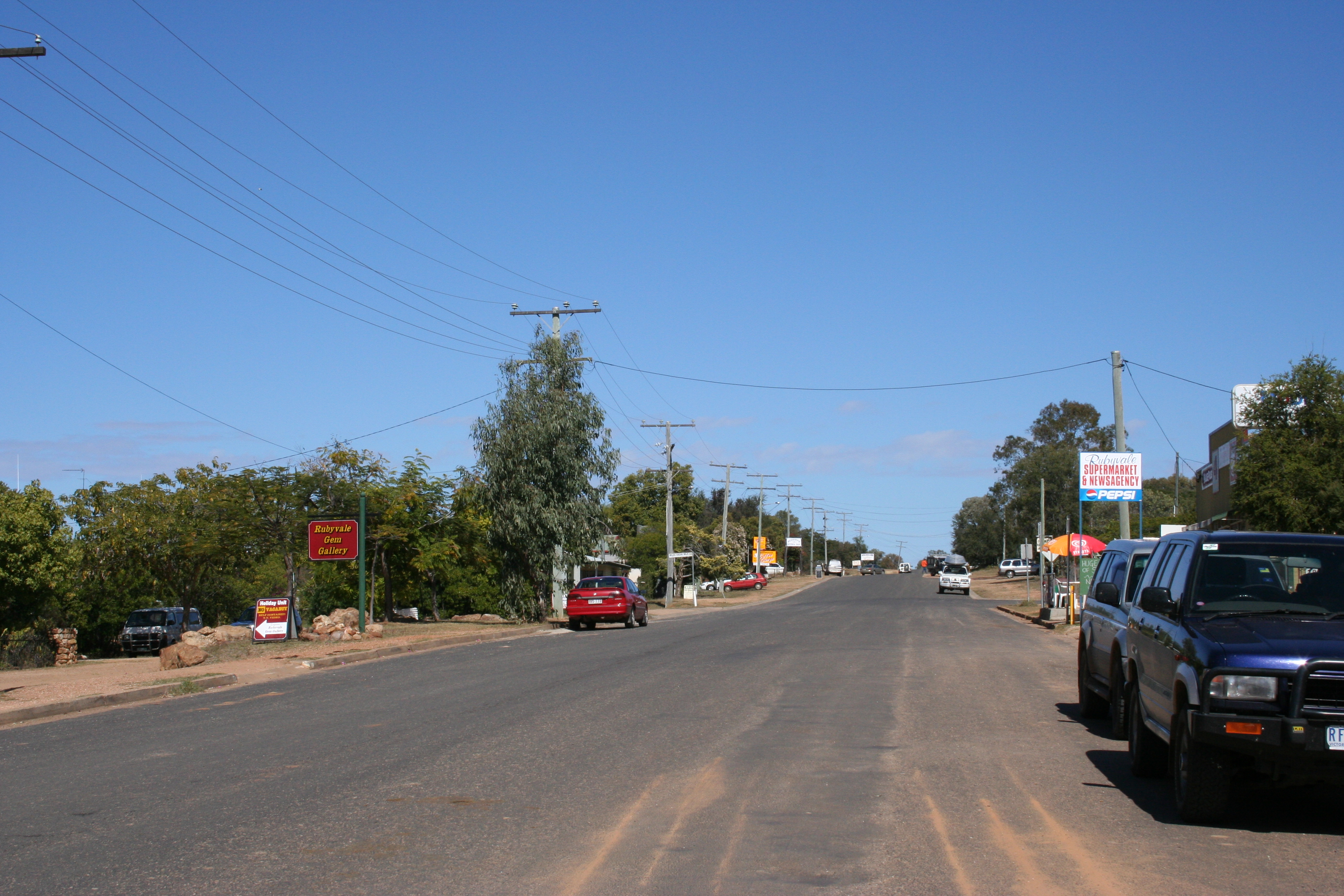
- Main street of Rubyvale

- Interactive map of Rubyvale
- Coordinates: 23.4191°S 147.6983°E
- Country: Australia
- State: Queensland
- LGA: Central Highlands Region
- Location: 62.1 km (38.6 mi) WNW of Emerald; 332 km (206 mi) W of Rockhampton; 894 km (556 mi) NW of Brisbane

Government
  - State electorate: Gregory
  - Federal division: Flynn

Area
  - Total: 337.1 km^{2} (130.2 sq mi)

Population
  - Total: 518 (2021 census)
  - Density: 1.5366/km^{2} (3.980/sq mi)
- Time zone: UTC+10:00 (AEST)
- Postcode: 4702
Localities around Rubyvale
Argyll	Argyll	Carbine Creek
Argyll	Rubyvale	Fork Lagoons
Willows	Anakie Siding	Sapphire Central

Rubyvale is a rural town and locality in the Central Highlands Region, Queensland, Australia. In the 2021 census, the town of Rubyvale had a population of 518 people.

== Geography ==
The town is located near the south-east boundary of the locality. The town is approximately 61 kilometres (38 mi) west of Emerald. Sapphires are mined extensively in the area.

== History ==
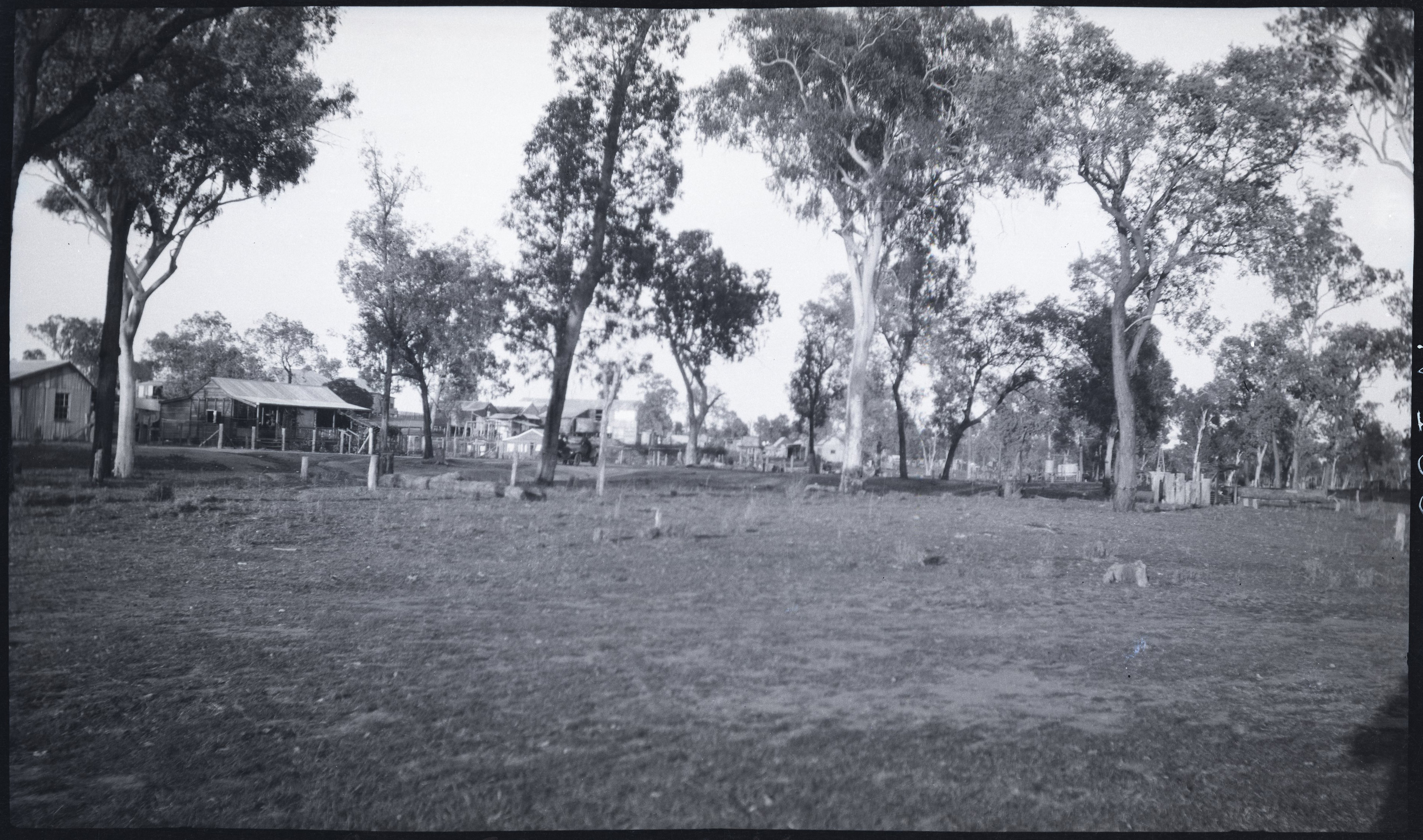
Historic photo of Rubyvale (undated)

The name Rubyvale derives from a ruby weighing 5 to 6 pennyweights (0.27 to 0.33 oz; 7.8 to 9.3 g) found near the town by miner William Dunn in the early 1900s. Dunn was very proud of the ruby and did not sell it but showed it to people he trusted; after his death the ruby could not be found.

Rubyvale Provisional School opened on 19 October 1908. On 1 January 1909 it became Rubyvale State School. It closed in 1963.

Rubyvale was one of three towns within the former locality of The Gemfields (the others being Sapphire and Anakie) until 17 April 2020, when the Queensland Government decided to replace The Gemfields with three new localities (Rubyvale, Sapphire Central and Anakie Siding) based around each of the three towns respectively. The boundaries of Argyll were also modified to accommodate the introduction of the locality of Rubyvale with an area of 337.1 square kilometres (130.2 sq mi).

== Demographics ==
In the 2006 census, the town of Rubyvale had a population of 510 people.

In the 2016 census, the town of Rubyvale had a population of 640 people.

In the 2021 census, the town of Rubyvale had a population of 518 people.

== Amenities ==
Rubyvale has a convenience store/news agents, post office, hotel and take-away bottle shop, as well as a variety of accommodation and fossicking areas. Some popular places to go fossicking are the Bob n John Mine, Bobby Dazzler and Pats Gems.

The Central Highlands Regional Council operates a public library at 7 Burridge Road (23.4200°S 147.6998°E).

== Education ==
There are no schools in Rubyvale. The nearest government primary school is Anakie State School in Anakie Siding to the south. The nearest government secondary schools are Emerald State High School in Emerald to the east and Capella State High School in Capella to the north-east.

== Climate ==
The area can get up to 40 °C (104 °F) during summer, and can reach 0 °C (32 °F) in winter.

== Heritage listings ==
Rubyvale has a number of heritage-listed sites, including:

- Tomahawk Creek Huts
