= Sapphire Central, Queensland =

Sapphire Central
- Suburb
- Interactive map of Sapphire Central
- Coordinates: 23.4839°S 147.7369°E
- Country: Australia
- State: Queensland
- LGA: Central Highlands Region
- Location: 54 km (34 mi) W of Emerald; 324 km (201 mi) W of Rockhampton; 886 km (551 mi) NW of Brisbane

Government
  - State electorate: Gregory
  - Federal division: Flynn

Area
  - Total: 140.8 km^{2} (54.4 sq mi)

Population
  - Total: 1,214 (2021 census)
  - Density: 8.622/km^{2} (22.331/sq mi)
- Time zone: UTC+10:00 (AEST)
- Postcode: 4702
Suburbs around Sapphire Central
Rubyvale	Rubyvale	Fork Lagoons
Rubyvale	Sapphire Central	Anakie Siding
Anakie Siding	Anakie Siding	Anakie Siding

Sapphire Central is a rural locality in the Central Highlands Region, Queensland, Australia. The town of Sapphire is within the locality (23.46111°S 147.7208°E). Sapphires are mined extensively in the area.

Sapphire was one of three towns within the locality of The Gemfields (the others being Anakie and Rubyvale) until 17 April 2020, when the Queensland Government decided to replace The Gemfields with three new localities (Sapphire Central, Anakie Siding and Rubyvale) based around each of the three towns respectively. The boundaries of the locality of Argyll were also modified to accommodate the introduction of the locality of Sapphire Central with an area of 140.8 square kilometres (54.4 sq mi).

In the 2021 census, Sapphire Central had a population of 1,214 people.

== Geography ==
Mount Bullock is in the north-west of the locality and west of the town (23.4694°S 147.6944°E). It is 335 metres (1,099 ft) above sea level.

In the south-west of the locality is The Three Sisters Range (midpoint 23.5124°S 147.6542°E) which extends south into Anakie Siding. It contains a number of unnamed peaks rising to 370 metres (1,210 ft) above sea level.

Apart from the west of the locality, most of Sapphire Central is relatively flat at 230 metres (750 ft) above sea level.

== History ==
Sapphire Provisional School opened in 1904. On 1 January 1909 it became Sapphire State School. It closed in 1939.

Sapphire was one of three towns within the locality of The Gemfields (the others being Anakie and Rubyvale) until 17 April 2020, when the Queensland Government decided to replace The Gemfields with three new localities (Sapphire Central, Anakie Siding and Rubyvale) based around each of the three towns respectively. The boundaries of the locality of Argyll were also modified to accommodate the introduction of the locality of Sapphire Central with an area of 140.8 square kilometres (54.4 sq mi).

== Demographics ==
In the 2006 census, the town of Sapphire had a population of 550 people.

In the 2016 census, the town of Sapphire had a population of 572 people.

In the 2021 census, the locality of Sapphire Central had a population of 1,214 people.

== Education ==
There are no schools in Sapphire Central. The nearest government primary school is Anakie State School is in neighbouring Anakie Siding. The nearest government secondary school is Emerald State High School in Emerald.
