= Anakie Siding, Queensland =

Town in central Queensland, Australia

Anakie Siding
- Suburb
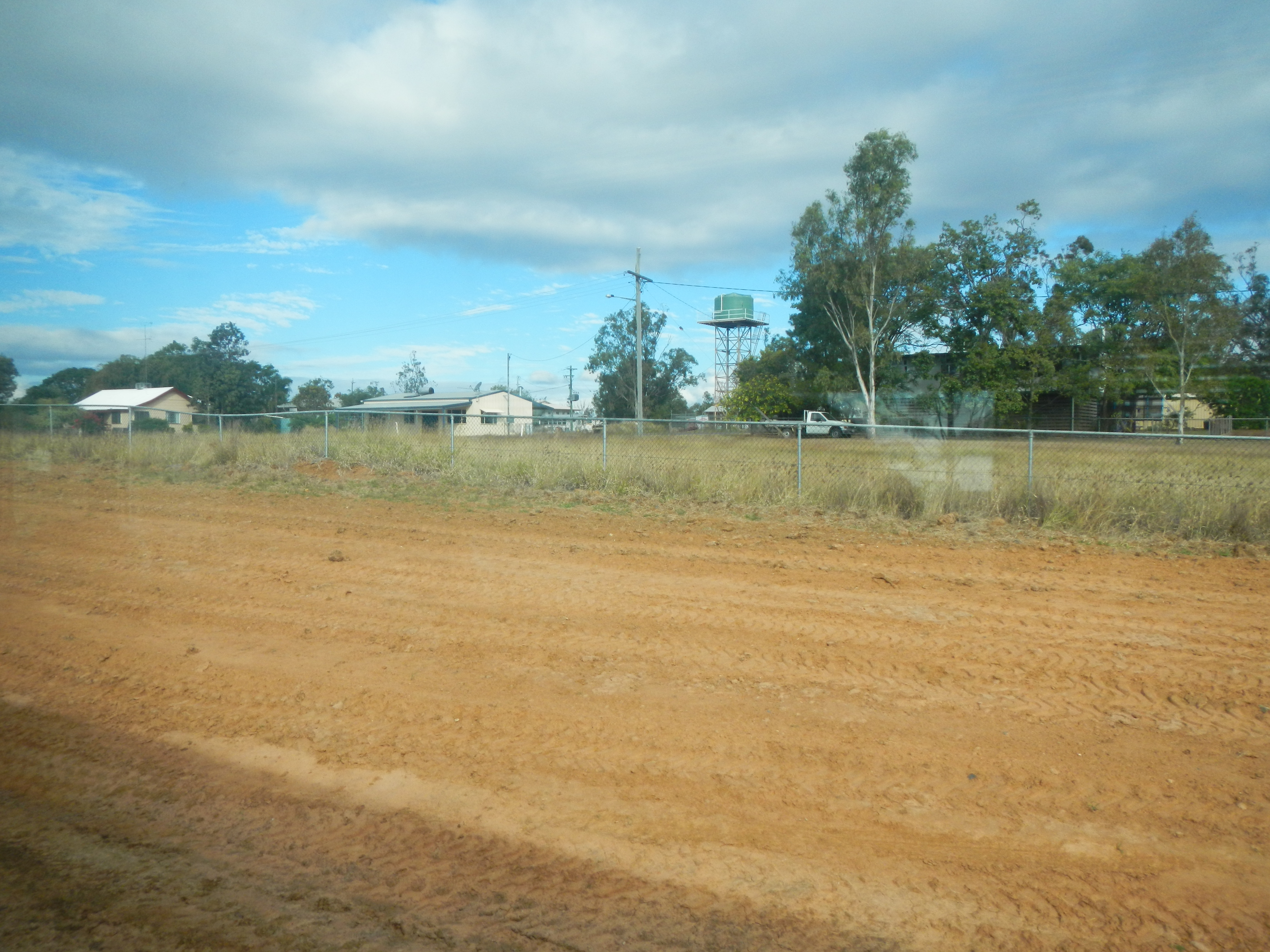
- Outskirts of Anakie, 2013

- Interactive map of Anakie Siding
- Coordinates: 23.5750°S 147.8075°E
- Country: Australia
- State: Queensland
- LGA: Central Highlands Region
- Location: 44.8 km (27.8 mi) W of Emerald; 315 km (196 mi) W of Rockhampton; 876 km (544 mi) NW of Brisbane

Government
  - State electorate: Gregory
  - Federal division: Flynn

Area
  - Total: 574.4 km^{2} (221.8 sq mi)

Population
  - Total: 155 (2021 census)
  - Density: 0.2698/km^{2} (0.6989/sq mi)
- Time zone: UTC+10:00 (AEST)
- Postcode: 4702
Suburbs around Anakie Siding
Rubyvale	Sapphire Central	Fork Lagoons
Willows	Anakie Siding	Emerald
Lochington	Lochington	Gindie

Anakie Siding (/ˈænəkiː/ AN-uh-kee) is a rural locality in the Central Highlands Region, Queensland, Australia. It contains the town of Anakie. It is a sapphire mining area. In 2021 census, the locality of Anakie Siding had a population of 155 people.

== Geography ==
The town is located just to the south of the Capricorn Highway, 44 kilometres (27 mi) west of Emerald.

The town of Anakie is on the Central Western railway line running from Rockhampton west to Longreach. The town is served by the Anakie railway station (23.5528°S 147.7453°E). There is a railway siding at Taroborah (23.5414°S 147.9450°E).

There is a billabong to the south-east of the town (23.5531°S 147.7485°E).

In the north-west of the locality is The Three Sisters Range which extends north into Sapphire Central (midpoint 23.5124°S 147.6542°E). It contains a number of unnamed peaks rising to 370 metres (1,210 ft) above sea level.

== History ==
The pastoral runs in the Leichhardt District were surveyed by August 1866, including Anakie Downs, Saint Helens, Emerald Downs, and Glendarriwill. At this time, the estimated 85 square miles (220 km^{2}) Anakie Downs property was owned by R. Treffitt (also given as Triffit), who also owned the nearby Retreat run. On 17 January 1870 the 'superb station property known as the St. Helens, Anaki [sic], and Retreat runs situate on the Nogoa River, Leichhardt District, in the midst of the choicest and most remunerative stations in North Queensland', together with 10000 sheep, was sold by public auction to R. F. Greene for £2750. The property was sold again by February 1880.

A railway line west from Emerald Downs was considered for the area by the chief engineer for the Railway Department in 1878, but difficulties encountered with mountain ranges further to the west. This line 'beyond Emerald Downs first passes through the good country known as Anaki [sic] Downs' was still unresolved by March 1878. A 0.25 miles (0.40 km) rail siding had been added to the new line by November 1884.

Anakie Provisional School was opened 27 July 1885. On 1 January 1909, it became Anakie State School. It had occasional closures due to low student numbers.

Anakie Post Office opened on 12 March 1894 (a receiving office had been open since 1885).

Taraborah Provisional School opened in 1900. On 1 January 1909, it became Taraborah State School. It closed in 1911. The name is also written as Taroborah State School.

By September 1902, the area was becoming known for sapphire mines, the nearest on Retreat Creek, 8 miles (13 km) from the Anakie railway station. With granitic rock masses and adjoining metamorphic rocks including gneiss, with hornblende, some epidote, some ruby, and garnet, zircons were also found. The quality of the blue, red, and yellow sapphires was noted.

Anakie was one of three towns within the locality of The Gemfields (the others being Sapphire and Rubyvale) until 17 April 2020, when the Queensland Government decided to replace The Gemfields with three new localities (Anakie Siding, Sapphire Central and Rubyvale) based around each of the three towns respectively. The boundaries of the localities of Emerald and Gindie were also modified to accommodate the introduction of the locality of Anakie Siding with an area of 574.4 square kilometres (221.8 sq mi).

== Demographics ==
In 2021 census, the locality of Anakie Siding had a population of 155 people.

== Transport ==
Greyhound buses run west (and return) from Rockhampton along the Capricorn Highway.

Emerald (about 44 kilometres (27 mi) east) has an airport with regular services to Brisbane and other points.

Queensland Rail's Spirit of the Outback train service that runs twice weekly will stop at Anakie on request.

== Education ==
Anakie State School is a government primary (Prep–6) school for boys and girls at 1 School Lane (23.5540°S 147.7458°E). In 2017, the school had an enrolment of 83 students with 7 teachers (6 full-time equivalent) and 7 non-teaching staff (4 full-time equivalent). It has a cattle club which attends local agricultural shows to enter the junior cattle judging competitions.

There are no secondary schools in Anakie. The nearest government secondary school is Emerald State High School in Emerald to the east.
