= Central Highlands Region =

- Local government area
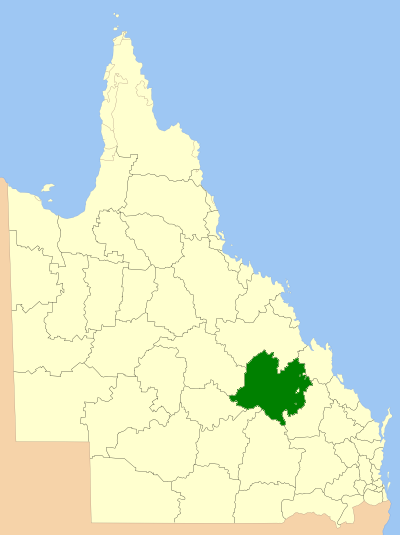
- Location within Queensland

- Interactive map of Central Highlands Region
- Country: Australia
- State: Queensland
- Established: 2008
- Council seat: Emerald

Government
  - Mayor: Janice Moriarty
  - State electorate: Gregory
  - Federal division: Flynn

Area
  - Total: 59,834 km^{2} (23,102 sq mi)

Population
  - Total: 27,836 (2021 census)
  - Density: 0.465220/km^{2} (1.20492/sq mi)
- Website: Central Highlands Region
LGAs around Central Highlands Region
Isaac	Rockhampton	Rockhampton
Barcaldine	Central Highlands Region	Banana
Blackall-Tambo; Murweh	Maranoa	Western Downs

Central Highlands Region is a local government area in Queensland, Australia. In the 2021 census, the Central Highlands Region had a population of 27,836 people.

== History ==
Wadja (also known as Wadjigu, Wadya, Wadjainngo, Mandalgu, and Wadjigun) is an Australian Aboriginal language in Central Queensland. The language region includes the local government areas of the Aboriginal Shire of Woorabinda and Central Highlands Region, including the Blackdown Tableland, the Comet River, and the Expedition Range, and the towns of Woorabinda, Springsure and Rolleston.

Yambina (also known as Jambina and Jambeena) is an Australian Aboriginal language of Central Queensland. Its traditional language region is the local government area of Central Highlands Region, including Peak Downs, Logan Creek, south to Avon Downs, east to Denham Range and Logan Downs, west to Elgin Downs and at Solferino.

Yetimarala (also known as Jetimarala, Yetimaralla, and Bayali) is an Australian Aboriginal language of Central Queensland. Its traditional language region is within the local government areas of Central Highlands Region, on the Boomer Range and Broadsound Range and the Fitzroy River, Killarney Station, Mackenzie River and Isaac River.

The Central Highlands Region was created in March 2008 as a result of the report of the Local Government Reform Commission released in July 2007. The new local government area, located in Central Queensland, contains the entire areas of four previous local government areas:

- the Shire of Bauhinia;
- the Shire of Duaringa;
- the Shire of Emerald; and
- the Shire of Peak Downs.

Legislation introduced into the Queensland Parliament gave the name of the new region as Central Highlands. The report recommended that the new local government area should not be divided into wards and should elect eight councillors and a mayor. The Central Highlands Region has an area of 59,834 square kilometres (23,102 sq mi), contained an estimated resident population in 2018 of 28,645 and has an estimated operating budget of A$66 million.

On 17 April 2020, the Queensland Government re-drew the boundaries of localities within the Region by:

- replacing the locality of The Gemfields with three new localities of Rubyvale, Sapphire Central and Anakie Siding (around the towns of Rubyvale, Sapphire, and Anakie respectively)
- adjusting the boundaries of existing localities to accommodate these changes by:
  - Argyll losing its south-eastern corner to become the northern part of the new Rubyvale and the north-eastern part of the new Sapphire Central
  - Emerald gaining the north-eastern corner and eastern parts of The Gemfields but losing a small area on its western boundary to the new Anakie Siding
  - Gindie gaining the south-eastern corner of The Gemfields and gaining the eastern edge of Lochington, but losing a small area of its northern part and a small area from its north-east part to Anakie Siding
  - Lochington losing a small portion of land to the north to the new Anakie Siding, losing land from its north-eastern edge mostly to Gindie but gaining a small piece of land from Minerva
  - Minerva losing a small piece of land from its north-western edge of Lochington

As a consequence of these changes, Lake Maraboon is now entirely within the north-west of Gindie and the boundary between Lochington and Minerva/Gindie more closely follows the course of the Nogoa River.

== Demographics ==
In the 2016 census, the Central Highlands Region had a population of 27,999 people.

In the 2021 census, the Central Highlands Region had a population of 27,836 people.

== Towns and localities ==
The Central Highlands Region includes the following settlements:

Bauhinia area:

- Arcadia Valley (rural locality)
- Arcturus (rural locality)
- Buckland (locality)
- Cairdbeign (locality)
- Cona Creek (locality)
- Consuelo (rural locality)
- Coorumbene (rural locality)
- Humboldt (rural locality)
- Lowesby (rural locality)
- Minerva (rural locality)
- Mungabunda (rural locality)
- Nandowrie (locality)
- Orion (village)
- Rewan (rural locality)
- Rolleston (town)
- Springsure (town)
- Togara (rural locality)
- Wealwandangie (rural locality)

Duaringa area:

- Bauhinia (township)
- Blackwater (town)
- Bluff (town)
- Dingo (town)
- Duaringa (town)

Emerald area:

- Bogantungan (village)
- Comet (village)
- Emerald (town)
- Fernlees (village)
- Gindie (village)
- Lochington (locality)
- Withersfield (village)
- Yamala (village)
- Anakie (Gemfields town)
- Rubyvale (Gemfields town)
- Sapphire (Gemfields town)
- The Willows (sometimes also called Willows Gemfields)

Peak Downs area:

- Argyll (rural locality)^{1}
- Capella (town)
- Crinum (locality)
- Theresa Creek (rural locality)
- Tieri (town)

Notes:

^{1} – partially shared with Isaac Region (former Belyando Shire)

== Libraries ==
The Central Highlands Region operates public libraries at Bauhinia, Blackwater, Capella, Dingo, Duaringa, Emerald, Rubyvale (The Gemfields), Rolleston, Springsure and Tieri.

== Mayors ==
- 2008–2016: Peter John Eric Maguire
- 2016–2024: Kerry Michael Hayes
- 2024–present: Janice Margaret Moriarty
