= Emerald, Queensland =

Town in Queensland central highlands, Australia

Emerald
- Town
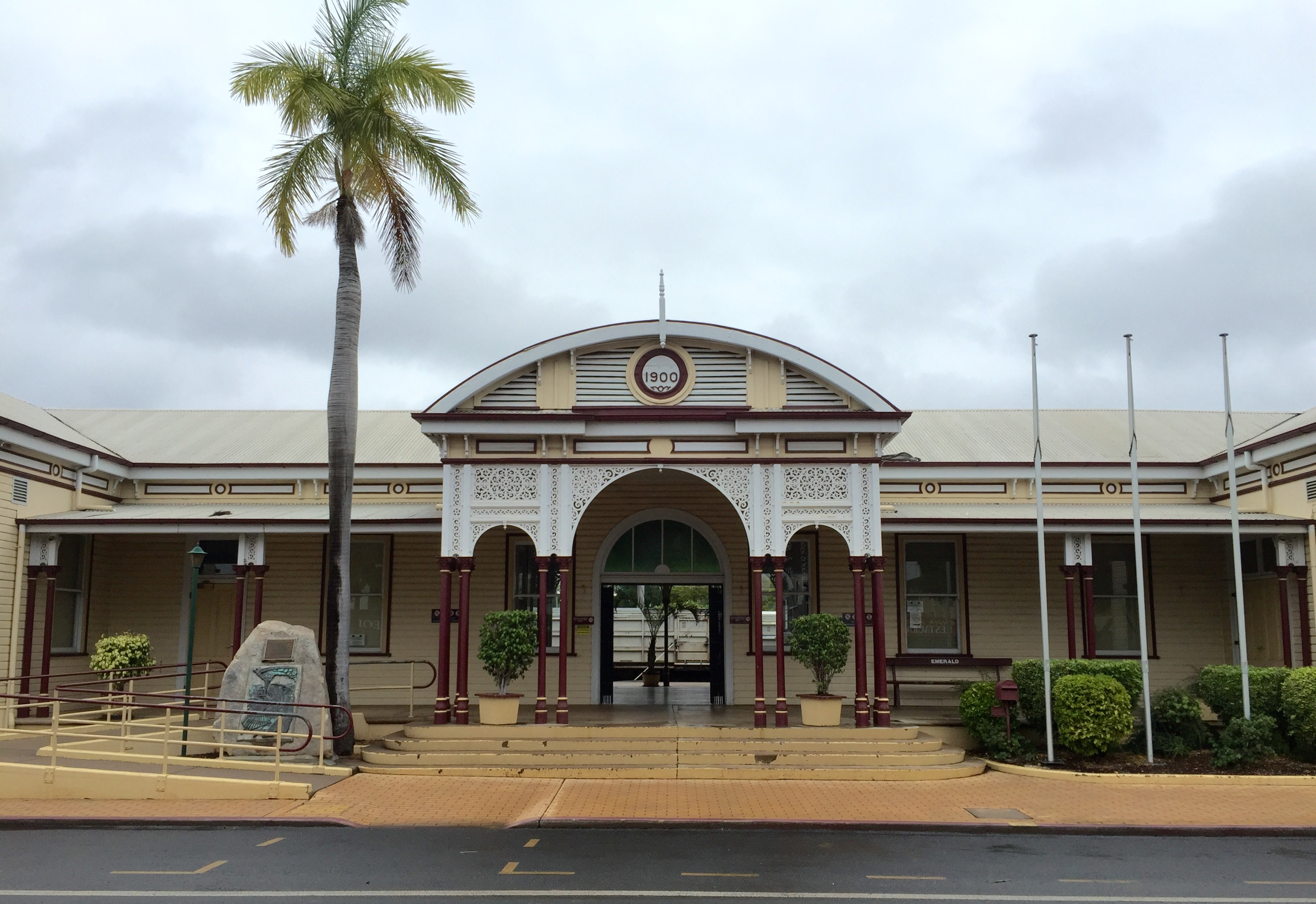
- Emerald railway station, 2016

- Interactive map of Emerald
- Coordinates: 23.5208°S 148.1619°E
- Country: Australia
- State: Queensland
- LGA: Central Highlands Region
- Location: 271 km (168 mi) W of Rockhampton; 832 km (517 mi) NW of Brisbane
- Established: 1879

Government
  - State electorate: Gregory
  - Federal division: Flynn

Area
  - Total: 611.1 km^{2} (235.9 sq mi)
- Elevation: 189 m (620 ft)

Population
  - Total: 14,904 (2021 census)
  - Density: 24.3888/km^{2} (63.167/sq mi)
- Time zone: UTC+10:00 (AEST)
- Postcode: 4720
- Mean max temp: 29.4 °C (84.9 °F)
- Mean min temp: 15.0 °C (59.0 °F)
- Annual rainfall: 541.2 mm (21.31 in)
Localities around Emerald
| Fork Lagoons | Wyuna | Comet |
| Anakie Siding | Emerald | Comet |
| Gindie | Gindie | Comet |

Emerald is a town and locality in the Central Highlands Region, Queensland, Australia. Situated on the Nogoa River, Emerald lies approximately 270 kilometres west of Rockhampton and serves as major service centre for the region's extensive agricultural and mining industries. Emerald's climate is classified as subtropical, with hot summers and mild winters. The town is the headquarters for the Central Highlands Regional Council. In the 2021 census, the locality of Emerald had a population of 14,904.

Emerald was founded as the terminus of the Central Western railway line in 1879, however this lasted only a year before subsequent lines were built to Springsure and Clermont leading to Emerald becoming a transport hub. The town's development accelerated in the 1980s onwards, primarily due to its proximity to the Bowen Basin coalfields, leading to rapid population growth and urban expansion.

Emerald's economy is diverse, encompassing agriculture, mining, and renewable energy. The Central Highlands is known for its fertile soils; its agricultural products include cotton, grain, citrus, grape, and sunflower cultivation. Emerald is also an important freight and logistics hub for Central Queensland, being the site of north Australia's first inland port. The town is served by the Emerald Airport.

Located just south of Emerald, the Fairbairn Dam, creates Lake Maraboon, one of Australia's largest artificial lakes its capacity is approximately three times larger than Sydney Harbour. Spanning up to 150 square kilometres when full, the lake is a popular destination for water sports, fishing, and camping. Emerald is also a tourist destination to access the Carnarvon National Park and Carnarvon Gorge, one of Australia's most iconic wilderness landscapes.

== History ==
The traditional owners include the Gayiri people who occupied the area for tens of thousands of years before European colonisation began in the nineteenth century. The Gayiri (Kairi, Khararya) language region takes in the landscape of the Central Highlands Region, including Emerald and the Nogoa River.

The first European to explore the area was Ludwig Leichhardt between 1843 and 1845. The British Colony of Queensland was established in 1859.

The town takes its name from the pastoral run Emerald Downs, a name chosen circa 1860 by pastoralist Peter Fitzallan Macdonald. It has been claimed that the origin of that name relates to the finding of the emerald gemstone, but another claim is that it was named for the lush green pastures in the area.

Emerald was established in 1879 as a base for the Central line railway from Rockhampton. Emerald Post Office opened on 5 June 1879.

Emerald State School opened on 3 November 1879. A secondary department was added to the school in 1919 but that department was closed in 1921. The secondary department reopened in 1959 and operated until the separate Emerald State High School opened in 1969.

St Patrick's Catholic School was established on 31 January 1902 by the Presentation Sisters. They provided a boarding facility for girls and boys from 1906 to 1961. The last of the Presentation Sisters left the school in 1992 after which it was operated by the Rockhampton Catholic Education Office.

Emerald North State School opened on 29 January 1980. A preschool was added on 20 February 1980. A special education unit opened on 23 January 1984. The preschool and special education units closed in 1999.

The Emerald campus of the Capricornia School of Distance Education opened on 1 February 1993.

The new Emerald Library building opened in 1994.

Marist College was established in 1996 by the Marist Brothers.

Denison State School opened on 28 January 1997. It takes its name from the County of Denison, which was named after Sir William Denison, the Governor General of the Australian Colonies in the 1850s.

In October 1999, as part of the Van Gogh Project, the Big Easel was unveiled in Emerald.

Emerald Christian College (originally known as Emerald Educational College) opened in 2001.

The citrus industry was severely affected by a citrus canker outbreak that started in 2004 and was declared over in early 2009. More than half a million citrus trees located around Emerald had to be destroyed.

The visitor information centre opened on 26 September 2005.

In 2007, the Emerald Uniting Church was enlarged by the Uniting congregation at Fernlees when that church was closed.

St Brigid's Catholic Primary School was established in 2014 by the Rockhampton Catholic Education Office.

Ontrack College Emerald opened in February 2018 (originally called Ontrack Special Assistance College). It was established by the Emerald Christian College to support students who are disengaged from mainstream schooling.

On 17 April 2020, the Queensland Government re-drew the boundaries of localities within the Central Highlands Region by replacing the locality of The Gemfields with three new localities of Rubyvale, Sapphire Central and Anakie Siding (around the towns of Rubyvale, Sapphire, and Anakie respectively). This included adjusting the boundaries of other existing localities in the Region to accommodate these changes; Emerald gained the north-eastern corner and eastern parts of The Gemfields but losing a small area on its western boundary to the new Anakie Siding, increasing the area of the locality from 611.1 to 844.9 square kilometres (235.9 to 326.2 sq mi).

== Geography ==
Emerald lies on the Nogoa River, a tributary of the Fitzroy River. The town lies approximately 270 kilometres (170 mi) from the Coral Sea coast and approximately 270 kilometres (170 mi) west of the city of Rockhampton by road at the junction of the Capricorn and Gregory highways. Emerald sits approximately 10 kilometres (6.2 mi) south of the Tropic of Capricorn.

=== Climate ===
Emerald has a hot semi-arid climate (Koppen: BSh) with very hot, relatively wet summers and very mild, dry winters with cool nights. Warm to hot weather dominates for most of the year, with mean maximums ranging from 34.6 °C (94.3 °F) in January to 23.4 °C (74.1 °F) in July. The average annual rainfall is 559.0 millimetres (22.01 in), with a summer maximum. Temperature extremes have ranged from 46.2 °C (115.2 °F) on 15 December 1919 to −5.6 °C (21.9 °F) on 4 July 1899.

The original weather station was at the post office, starting in 1883. It closed in 1992, in favour of a new weather station at the airport 4.9 kilometres (3.0 mi) south east.

Climate data for Emerald (23º34'12"S, 148º10'48"E, 189 m AMSL) (1992–2024 normals, extremes 1889–present)
| Month | Jan | Feb | Mar | Apr | May | Jun | Jul | Aug | Sep | Oct | Nov | Dec | Year |
|---|---|---|---|---|---|---|---|---|---|---|---|---|---|
| Record high °C (°F) | 45.6 (114.1) | 44.3 (111.7) | 42.9 (109.2) | 38.1 (100.6) | 34.3 (93.7) | 32.0 (89.6) | 32.8 (91.0) | 38.2 (100.8) | 39.9 (103.8) | 42.4 (108.3) | 44.6 (112.3) | 46.2 (115.2) | 46.2 (115.2) |
| Mean maximum °C (°F) | 39.9 (103.8) | 38.7 (101.7) | 37.0 (98.6) | 34.1 (93.4) | 30.5 (86.9) | 28.1 (82.6) | 28.0 (82.4) | 30.8 (87.4) | 34.8 (94.6) | 37.6 (99.7) | 38.8 (101.8) | 40.0 (104.0) | 41.7 (107.1) |
| Mean daily maximum °C (°F) | 34.6 (94.3) | 33.9 (93.0) | 32.9 (91.2) | 30.1 (86.2) | 26.4 (79.5) | 23.5 (74.3) | 23.4 (74.1) | 25.6 (78.1) | 29.1 (84.4) | 32.1 (89.8) | 33.4 (92.1) | 34.4 (93.9) | 30.0 (85.9) |
| Daily mean °C (°F) | 28.5 (83.3) | 28.0 (82.4) | 26.8 (80.2) | 23.6 (74.5) | 19.8 (67.6) | 16.9 (62.4) | 16.3 (61.3) | 17.9 (64.2) | 21.4 (70.5) | 24.7 (76.5) | 26.5 (79.7) | 27.9 (82.2) | 23.2 (73.7) |
| Mean daily minimum °C (°F) | 22.3 (72.1) | 22.1 (71.8) | 20.6 (69.1) | 17.1 (62.8) | 13.1 (55.6) | 10.3 (50.5) | 9.2 (48.6) | 10.1 (50.2) | 13.6 (56.5) | 17.2 (63.0) | 19.5 (67.1) | 21.4 (70.5) | 16.4 (61.5) |
| Mean minimum °C (°F) | 19.2 (66.6) | 19.1 (66.4) | 16.9 (62.4) | 12.6 (54.7) | 7.1 (44.8) | 4.1 (39.4) | 3.7 (38.7) | 4.3 (39.7) | 8.2 (46.8) | 11.8 (53.2) | 15.0 (59.0) | 17.7 (63.9) | 2.7 (36.9) |
| Record low °C (°F) | 7.8 (46.0) | 6.7 (44.1) | 7.2 (45.0) | 0.0 (32.0) | −1.2 (29.8) | −3.9 (25.0) | −5.6 (21.9) | −3.6 (25.5) | −2.2 (28.0) | 2.2 (36.0) | 1.8 (35.2) | 7.2 (45.0) | −5.6 (21.9) |
| Average precipitation mm (inches) | 83.1 (3.27) | 83.7 (3.30) | 58.1 (2.29) | 30.5 (1.20) | 20.9 (0.82) | 29.3 (1.15) | 19.0 (0.75) | 19.8 (0.78) | 25.5 (1.00) | 47.9 (1.89) | 58.5 (2.30) | 81.0 (3.19) | 559.0 (22.01) |
| Average precipitation days (≥ 1.0 mm) | 5.6 | 5.7 | 4.2 | 2.9 | 2.0 | 3.0 | 1.8 | 1.9 | 2.1 | 3.9 | 5.3 | 5.7 | 44.1 |
| Average afternoon relative humidity (%) | 41 | 45 | 37 | 36 | 37 | 41 | 36 | 32 | 30 | 31 | 33 | 36 | 36 |
| Average dew point °C (°F) | 17.0 (62.6) | 17.7 (63.9) | 14.5 (58.1) | 11.5 (52.7) | 8.9 (48.0) | 7.5 (45.5) | 5.7 (42.3) | 5.7 (42.3) | 6.9 (44.4) | 9.5 (49.1) | 12.0 (53.6) | 14.5 (58.1) | 11.0 (51.7) |
Source: Bureau of Meteorology (Dew point for 3pm)

=== Flooding ===
The biggest impact of flooding of the Nogoa River in Emerald itself was that one side of Emerald was cut off from the other and caravans at the Carinya Caravan Park would be towed to higher ground each time the Nogoa River rose, to prevent the caravans from being completely submerged. This caravan park is now the site of the Centro Property where Coles Supermarket and other businesses operate. A former swamp area is now part of Kidd Street (a housing development) which was an old river course. The watercourse that extended along the back of the hospital, past the rear of Woolworths and past the Information Centre has been converted into a channel with a concrete section on one side near the information centre, reducing the channel in size by approximately two-thirds. This area has been allowed to be developed in the vicinity of Creek Street.

Fairbairn Dam overflowed for the first time in 17 years on 19 January 2008.

== Demographics ==
In the 2021 census, the locality of Emerald had a population of 14,904. Aboriginal and Torres Strait Islander people made up 5% of the population. 77% of people were born in Australia. The next most common countries of birth were New Zealand (4%), Philippines (1.7%), South Africa (1.4%) and England (1.1%). 83% of people spoke only English at home. Other languages spoken at home included Afrikaans at 0.9%, and Tongan at 0.8%. 36.9% of people identified as non-religious, followed by 21.8% Catholic, and 10.6% Anglican.

In the 2016 census, the locality of Emerald had a population of 14,356.

== Heritage listings ==
Emerald has a number of heritage-listed sites, including:

- Emerald railway station, Clermont Street (Capricorn Highway)

== Economy ==
Emerald is a service town for a large number of industries in the area. Extensive coal mining operations are carried out in the district, including at Kestrel coal mine, Gregory coal mine and Ensham coal mine. Cotton is grown in the area, and is processed at the Yamala Cotton Gin, while other agricultural activities include grape, citrus and grain growing.

Emerald Solar Park is immediately west of the town (23.51°S 148.14°E) and generates up to 74MW of electricity.

== Education ==
Emerald State School is a government primary (Preparatory to Year 6) school for boys and girls on the eastern corner of Anakie Street and School Lane (23.5237°S 148.1605°E). In 2017, the school had an enrolment of 316 students with 25 teachers (21 full-time equivalent) and 14 non-teaching staff (8 full-time equivalent).

Emerald North State School is a government primary (Early Childhood to Year 6) school for boys and girls at Campbell Street (23.5132°S 148.1641°E). In 2017, the school had an enrolment of 249 students with 25 teachers (23 full-time equivalent) and 29 non-teaching staff (18 full-time equivalent). It includes a special education program.

Denison State School is a government primary (Preparatory to Year 6) school for boys and girls at 16 Gray Street (23.5322°S 148.1512°E). In 2017, the school had an enrolment of 497 students with 36 teachers (33 full-time equivalent) and 20 non-teaching staff (14 full-time equivalent). It includes a special education program.

Capricornia School of Distance Education is a government primary and secondary (Early Childhood to Year 12) school for boys and girls at the corner Gray and Gladstone Streets (23.5323°S 148.1520°E). In 2017, the school had an enrolment of 775 students with 72 teachers (64 full-time equivalent) and 21 non-teaching staff (15 full-time equivalent). It includes a special education program. The school operates from the Denison State School campus.

Emerald State High School is a government secondary (7–12) school for boys and girls at Old Airport Drive (23.5136°S 148.1582°E). In 2017, the school had an enrolment of 780 students with 62 teachers (59 full-time equivalent) and 33 non-teaching staff (22 full-time equivalent). It includes a special education program.

St Patrick's Catholic Primary School is a Catholic primary (Preparatory to Year 6) school for boys and girls at 41 Yamala Street (23.5233°S 148.1621°E). In 2017, the school had an enrolment of 491 students with 31 teachers (29 full-time equivalent) and 16 non-teaching staff (9 full-time equivalent).

St Brigid's Catholic Primary School is a Catholic primary (Preparatory to Year 6) school for boys and girls at 6311 Gregory Highway (23.5597°S 148.1696°E). In 2017, the school had an enrolment of 202 students with 16 teachers (15 full-time equivalent) and 8 non-teaching staff (5 full-time equivalent).

Marist College Emerald is a Catholic secondary (7–12) school for boys and girls at 30 Jeppesen Drive (23.5435°S 148.1592°E). In 2017, the school had an enrolment of 569 students with 50 teachers (47 full-time equivalent) and 25 non-teaching staff (19 full-time equivalent).

Emerald Christian College is a private primary and secondary (Preparatory to Year 12) school for boys and girls at 6373 Gregory Highway (23.5528°S 148.1708°E). In 2017, the school had an enrolment of 196 students with 22 teachers (20 full-time equivalent) and 18 non-teaching staff (10 full-time equivalent).

Ontrack College Emerald is a private primary and secondary (7–10) school at 114 Borilla Street (23.5266°S 148.1614°E). It seeks to provide for students fwho have disengaged from mainstream schools. In 2023, the school had an enrolment of 25 students with teachers and 2 non-teaching staff (1.6 full-time equivalent).

Central Queensland University has a campus in Emerald.

== Amenities ==
Central Highlands Regional Council operates Emerald Library at 44 Borilla Street, Emerald.

The Emerald branch of the Queensland Country Women's Association meets at the QCWA Rooms at 45 Borilla Street.

Emerald Uniting Church is at 49 Yamala Streets (corner of Borilla Street, 23.5236°S 148.1631°E).

Calvary Christian Church is at 11 Gladstone Street (23.5305°S 148.1544°E).

== Attractions ==
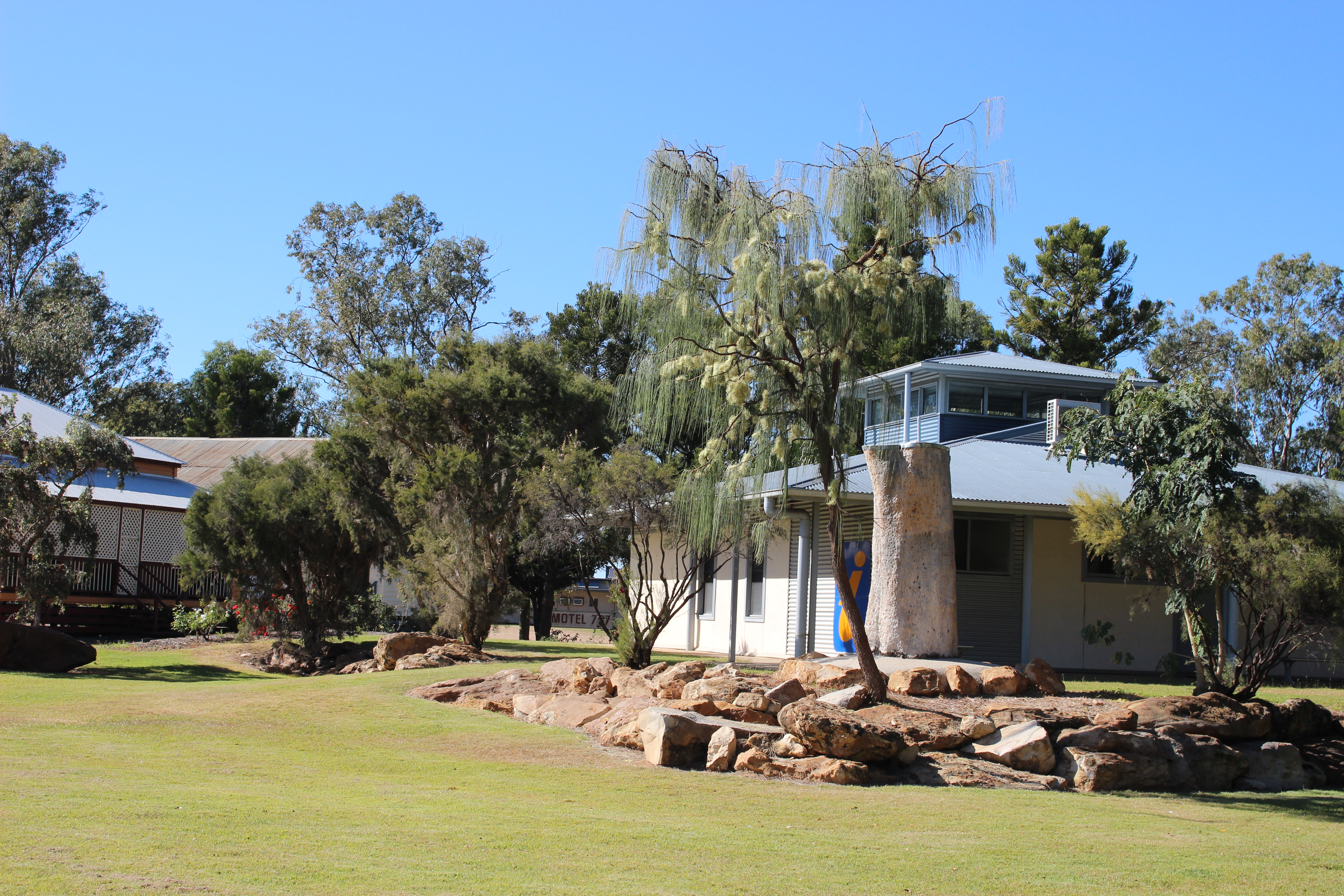
Visitor information centre, Emerald, 2017

To the west of the town is an area known as The Gemfields, with small towns such as Sapphire and Rubyvale indicating the type of gems found there. The sapphire fields located here are the largest in the southern hemisphere.

The Fairbairn Dam, a short drive to the south of the town, was opened in 1972, and holds back the waters of Lake Maraboon. The lake covers an area of up to 150 square kilometres (58 sq mi), making it one of the largest artificial lakes in the country. When full, it holds three times more water than Sydney Harbour. This extensive water supply has allowed the cotton industry to flourish in the area, and the lake is a boon for local water sports.

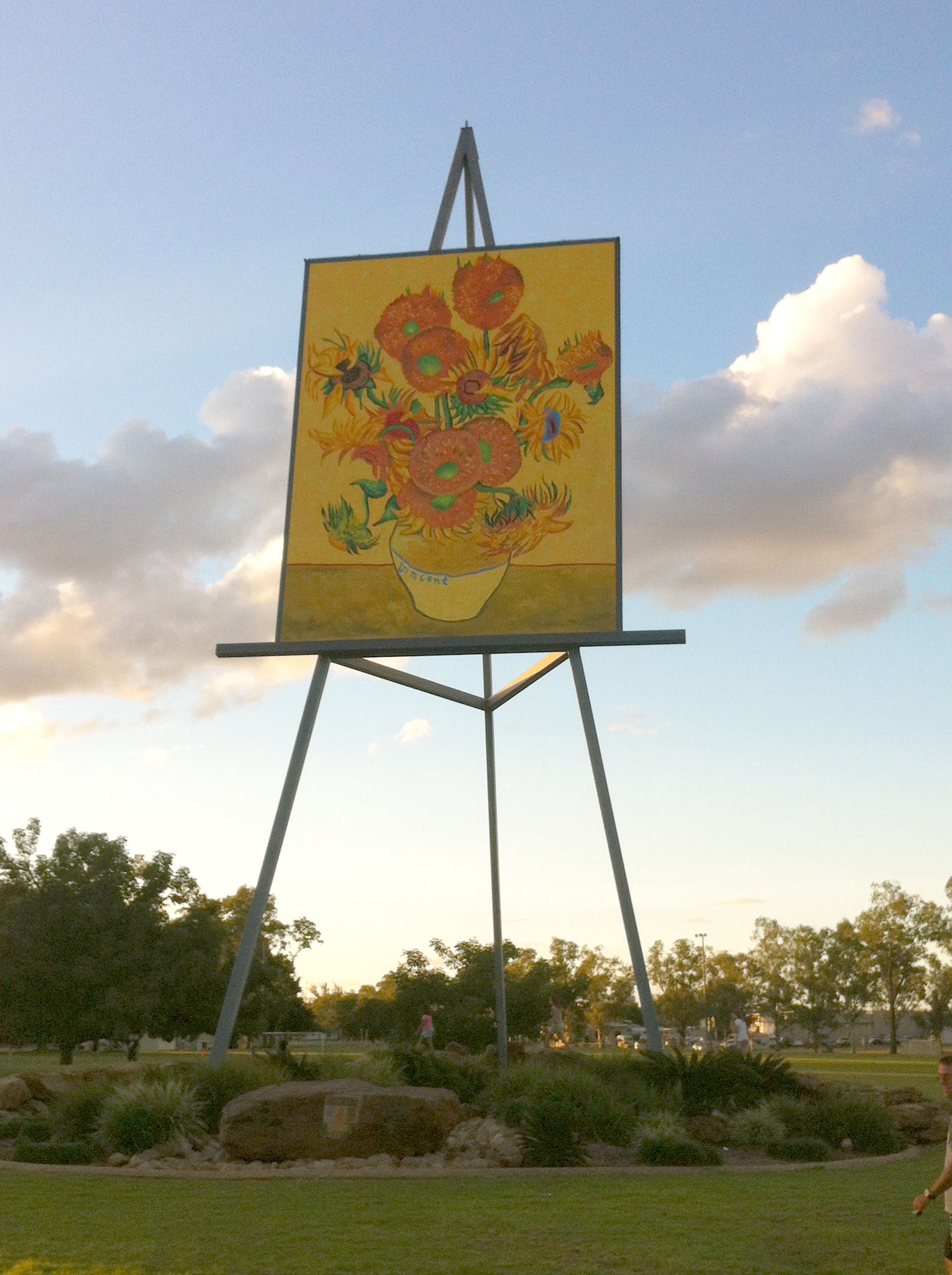
The Big Easel, 2012

Erected in 1999, the world's largest Vincent van Gogh sunflower painting is situated in Moreton Park. The structure is 25 metres (82 ft) high. It is one of seven works around the world by Cameron Cross in which he reproduces Van Gogh's sunflowers for the Van Gogh Project. He chose Emerald as a site for his work as it is a sunflower-growing area and has an annual sunflower festival. Being an oversized reproduction, it is considered one of Australia's Big Things.

== Events ==
Emerald holds an annual sunflower festival in the week before Easter.

== Media ==
=== Newspapers ===
Emerald Today, published each Friday, is the local Emerald newspaper. The newspaper focuses on local news and sport.

=== Radio ===
Emerald is served by two local commercial stations, one local ABC station and one local community station.

4HI is the oldest local radio station in Emerald, beginning transmissions from their local studio in November 1981. The station offers local breakfast and drive programming from their Emerald studio and carries nationally syndicated programming from 2GB Sydney.

In the late 1990s, youth-orientated commercial station Hot FM was launched in Emerald. Even though the station plays local commercials and imaging on a local frequency, no programming on the station originates from Emerald. Until 2013, the breakfast program which aired on Hot FM in Emerald was a regionally networked program from Townsville. It was subsequently replaced with the Hot FM CQ breakfast program that originates from Gladstone.

Emerald is served by ABC Capricornia, the region's ABC Local Radio station. ABC Capricornia is broadcast on a local frequency, but no programming originates from Emerald as the station's local breakfast and morning programs are relayed to the Emerald transmitter from Rockhampton.

Emerald is also served by local community radio station, 4EEE.

=== Television ===
Emerald receives all available ABC and commercial television stations from Rockhampton, and therefore local news bulletins Seven News and WIN News are broadcast to Emerald, with the bulletins occasionally featuring local news from the Central Highlands region.

== Sport ==
The most popular sport in Emerald is rugby league. The town has two teams, the Emerald Tigers and the Emerald Brothers, both of whom compete in the Central Highlands Rugby League competition, administered by the Queensland Rugby League.

== Notable residents ==
- Ethan Bullemor, Australian rugby league player
- Damian Gibson, Australian rugby league player
- Mitchell Langerak, Australian footballer
- Alan McIndoe, Australian rugby league player

== See also ==
- Emerald Airport
