= Kemmis, Queensland =

Kemmis
- Suburb
- Interactive map of Kemmis
- Coordinates: 21.6238°S 148.3311°E
- Country: Australia
- State: Queensland
- LGA: Isaac Region
- Location: 48.5 km (30.1 mi) SE of Glenden; 48.8 km (30.3 mi) WNW of Nebo; 148 km (92 mi) NE of Moranbah; 129 km (80 mi) SW of Mackay; 1,015 km (631 mi) NNW of Brisbane

Government
  - State electorate: Burdekin
  - Federal division: Capricornia

Area
  - Total: 462.1 km^{2} (178.4 sq mi)

Population
  - Total: 0 (2021 census)
  - Density: 0.0000/km^{2} (0.0000/sq mi)
- Time zone: UTC+10:00 (AEST)
- Postcode: 4742
Suburbs around Kemmis
Elphinstone	Hail Creek	Hail Creek
Burton	Kemmis	Hail Creek
Burton	Coppabella	Strathfield

Kemmis is a rural locality in the Isaac Region, Queensland, Australia. In the 2021 census, Kemmis had "no people or a very low population".

== Geography ==
The land is lower and flatter to the south and east, 260 metres (850 ft) above sea level. However, the terrain becomes more mountainous in the west and north of the locality, with the following peaks (from north to south):

- Mount Lookout (21.4347°S 148.3064°E) 460 metres (1,510 ft)
- Mount Hess (21.4606°S 148.3059°E) 580 metres (1,900 ft)
- Mount Yuckawaw (21.4717°S 148.3319°E) 475 metres (1,558 ft)

The Suttor Developmental Road enters the locality from the north-east (Hail Creek) and exits to the west (Elphinstone).

The Goonyella railway line enters the locality from the south-west (Strathfield) and exits to the north-west (Hail Creek).

South Walker Creek Mine is a large coal mine in the south of the locality extending into neighbouring Strathfield. There are many other former mine sites in Kemmis.

Apart from mining, the land use is grazing on native vegetation.

== History ==
The locality was named after pastoralist, Arthur Kemmis, who participated in William Landsborough's 1861 expedition from the Gulf of Carpentaria to Melbourne in search of the Burke and Wills expedition. Kemmis was partner in the lease of Fort Cooper pastoral run.

== Demographics ==
In the 2016 census, Kemmis had a population of 3 people.

In the 2021 census, Kemmis had "no people or a very low population".

== Education ==
There are no schools in Kemmis. The nearest government primary schools are Glenden State School in Glenden to the north-west, Nebo State School in Nebo to the east, and Coppabella State School in neighbouring Coppabella to the south. The nearest government secondary school is Glenden State School (to Year 12).
