= Shire of Belyando =

- Local government area
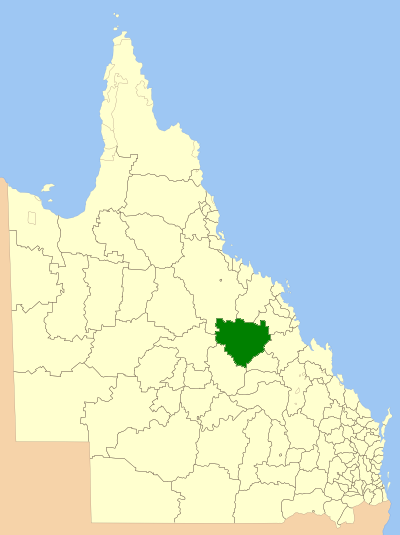
- Location within Queensland

- Country: Australia
- State: Queensland
- Region: Central Queensland
- Established: 1879
- Council seat: Clermont

Area
  - Total: 30,281.3 km^{2} (11,691.7 sq mi)

Population
  - Total: 10,455 (2006 census)
  - Density: 0.345263/km^{2} (0.89423/sq mi)
LGAs around Shire of Belyando
Dalrymple	Bowen	Nebo
Aramac	Shire of Belyando	Broadsound
Jericho	Jericho	Peak Downs

The Shire of Belyando was a local government area in Central Queensland, Australia. The Shire, administered from the town of Clermont, covered an area of 30,281.3 square kilometres (11,691.7 sq mi), and existed as a local government entity from 1879 until 2008, when it was amalgamated with the Shires of Broadsound and Nebo to form the Isaac Region.

The shire had two main towns, Clermont and Moranbah, and its economy was based on agriculture and mining. There are two coal mines in the area, one owned by BMA and one by Anglo Coal serviced by the town of Moranbah.

It is pronounced Bel-yando.

== History ==
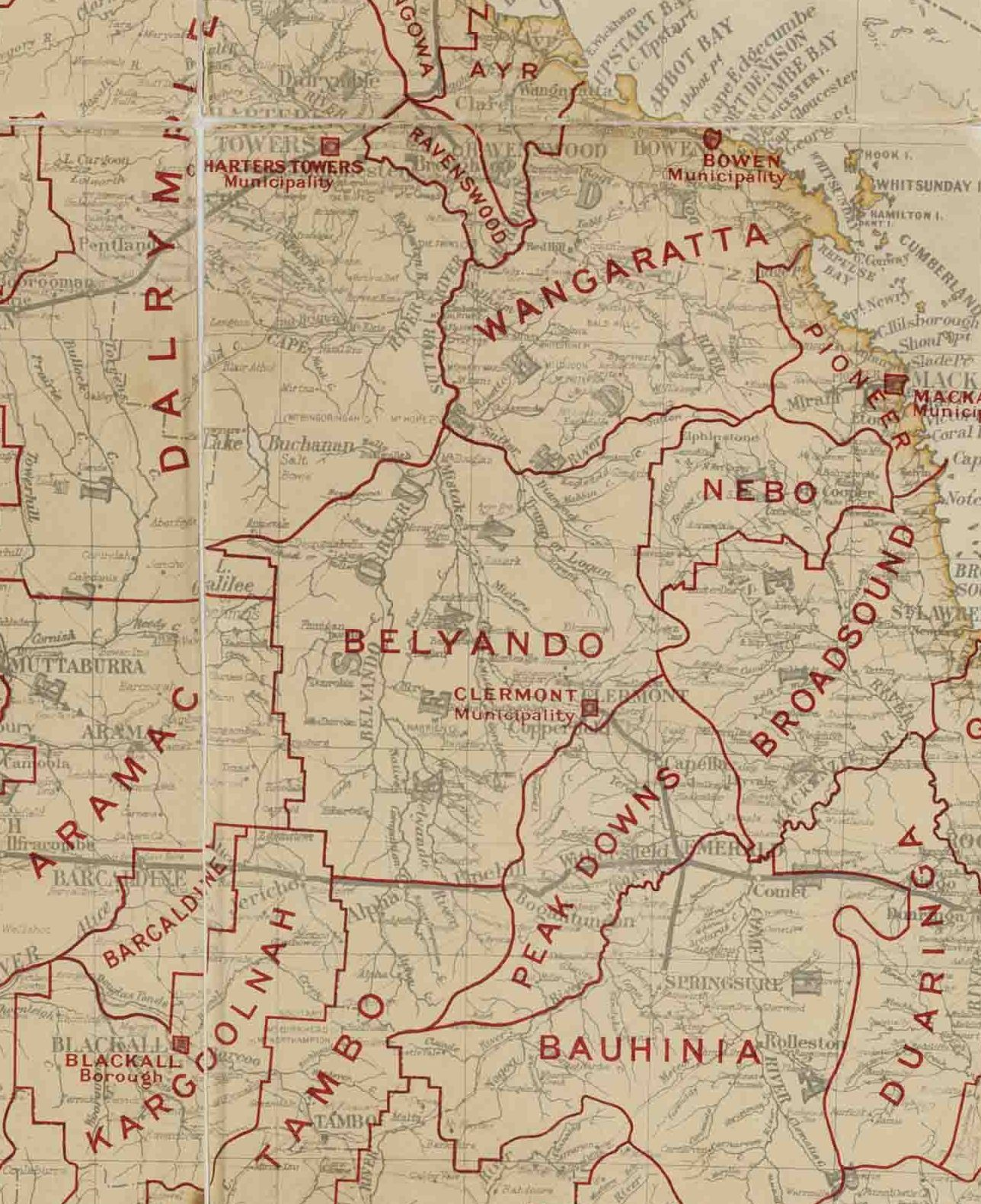
Map of Belyando Division and adjacent local government areas, March 1902

On 11 November 1879, the Belyando Division was established as one of 74 divisions around Queensland under the Divisional Boards Act 1879 with a population of 1494.

On 20 September 1884, Peak Downs Division was separated from the southern part of Belyando Division.

With the passage of the Local Authorities Act 1902, Belyando Division became Shire of Belyando on 31 March 1903.

As at 1966, the Belyando Shire Hall was at 21–23 Daintree Street (22.8251°S 147.6420°E).

On 15 March 2008, under the Local Government (Reform Implementation) Act 2007 passed by the Parliament of Queensland on 10 August 2007, Belyando merged with the Shires of Broadsound and Nebo to form the Isaac Region.

== Towns and localities ==
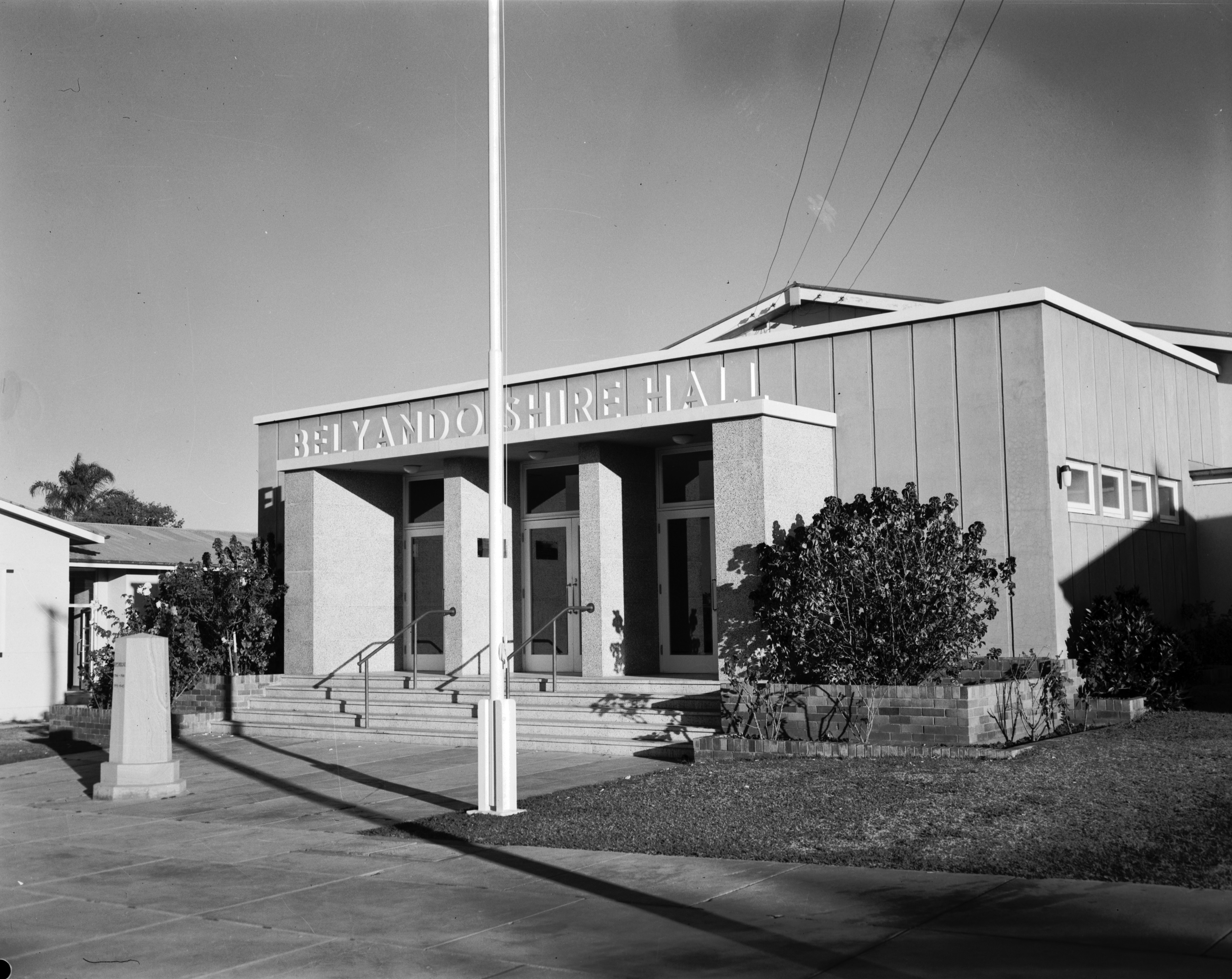
Belyando Shire Hall, Clermont, circa 1966

The Shire of Belyando included the following settlements:

- Clermont
- Moranbah
- Belyando
- Elgin
- Frankfield
- Kilcummin
- Laglan
- Winchester

== Chairmen ==
- 1927: Anthony William Appleton.

== Population ==
Year	Population
1933	2,987
1947	3,067
1954	3,104
1961	3,253
1966	2,997
1971	4,834
1976	7,210
1981	7,700
1986	11,362
1991	11,082
1996	10,755
2001	9,883
2006	10,455
