= Bowen Developmental Road =

Road in Queensland, Australia

Bowen Developmental Road Queensland
- Bowen Developmental Road (green on black)

General information
- Type: Rural road
- Length: 259 km (161 mi)
- Built by: Department of Transport and Main Roads
- Route number(s): State Route 77

Major junctions
- Northeast end: Bruce Highway (State Highway A1, Bowen
- Collinsville–Elphinstone Road; Suttor Developmental Road (State Route 11)
- Southwest end: Gregory Highway (State Highway A7), Belyando

Location(s)
- Major settlements: Collinsville

Bowen Developmental Road is a state-controlled district road (numbers 88A and 88B) rated as a local road of regional significance (LRRS). It is a rural strategic main road in Queensland, Australia. It is part of State Route 77, and functions as a highway. It has a length of 259 kilometres (161 mi) and extends in northeast-southwest direction from Bowen on the east coast of Australia to the Gregory Developmental Road in Belyando near Nairana National Park.

In its course, the road crosses the Clark Range and Leichhardt Range. Until the station Whynot it is paved. The last 70 kilometres (43 mi) were dirt road but some further sealing was done in 2021.

The highest point in the course of the highway is at 394 metres (1,293 ft), the lowest at 8 metres (26 ft).

== Route description ==
State Route 77 departs from the Bruce Highway in a southerly direction, just west of Bowen. From there to Collinsville it is signed as Peter Delamothe Road. From Collinsville onwards the road is signed as Bowen Developmental Road. The road generally follows the route of the railway line to a point south of Collinsville, where the railway continues south to coal mines and the road turns south-west, passing through the locality of Mount Coolon, where the Suttor Developmental Road branches off to the south. From here the road continues south-west until it meets the Gregory Developmental Road in the locality of Belyando.

== Northern Australia Roads Program upgrade ==
The Northern Australia Roads Program announced in 2016 included the following project for the Bowen Developmental Road.

=== Road sealing ===
The project for progressive sealing and minor drainage improvements was completed in early 2021 at a total cost of $28.8 million.

== Other upgrades ==
=== Paving and sealing ===
A project to pave and seal a further section of the road, at a cost of $15 million, was completed in late 2021.

== Major intersections ==
All distances are from Google maps. The road is within the Whitsunday and Isaac local government areas.

LGA	Location	km	mi	Destinations	Notes
Whitsunday	Bowen	0	0.0	Bruce Highway – northwest – Home Hill / southeast – Bowen and Proserpine	North eastern end of Bowen Developmental Road (State Route 77) Continues south west as Peter Delemothe Road
Whitsunday	Collinsville	80.7	50.1		Collinsville CBD. Road name changes to Bowen Developmental Road.
Whitsunday	Newlands	144	89	Collinsville–Elphinstone Road – south – Elphinstone	Road continues southwest
Whitsunday	Mount Coolon	206	128	Suttor Developmental Road – southeast – Nebo	
Isaac	Belyando	259	161	Gregory Highway – northwest – Charters Towers / southeast – Clermont	South western end of Bowen Developmental Road
1.000 mi = 1.609 km; 1.000 km = 0.621 mi: Route transition

== Sources ==
Steve Parish: Australian Touring Atlas . Steve Parish Publishing. Archerfield QLD 2007. ISBN 978-1-74193-232-4 . p. 10
