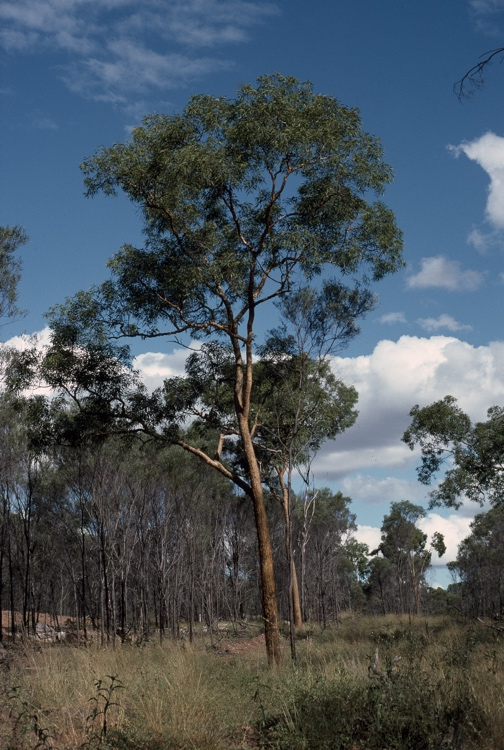

Scientific classification
- Kingdom: Plantae
- Clade: Embryophytes
- Clade: Tracheophytes
- Clade: Spermatophytes
- Clade: Angiosperms
- Clade: Eudicots
- Clade: Rosids
- Order: Myrtales
- Family: Myrtaceae
- Genus: Corymbia
- Species: C. aureola

Binomial name
- Corymbia aureola (Brooker & A.R.Bean) K.D.Hill & L.A.S.Johnson

Synonyms
- Eucalyptus aureola Brooker & A.R.Bean

= Corymbia aureola =

Yellowjacket

Species of plant

Corymbia aureola, commonly known as yellowjacket or yellow bloodwood, is a tree specie endemic to Queensland. It has rough bark on the trunk and large branches, lance-shaped to curved adult leaves. Its flower buds in groups of seven and barrel-shaped, urn-shaped or cylindrical fruit.

== Description ==
Corymbia aureola is a tree that typically grows to a height of 15 m (49 ft) and forms a lignotuber. It has rough, flaky to tessellated bark on the trunk and large branches, smooth greyish yellow bark on the thinnest branches. Young plants and coppice regrowth have glossy green, egg-shaped, lance-shaped or heart-shaped leaves that are paler on the lower surface, growing to 110–280 mm (4.3–11.0 in) long and 40–100 mm (1.6–3.9 in) wide. Adult leaves are the same shade of glossy green on both sides, lance-shaped to curved, 100–205 mm (3.9–8.1 in) long and 12–30 mm (0.47–1.18 in) wide on a petiole 11–30 mm (0.43–1.18 in) long. The flower buds are arranged on the ends of branchlets on a branched peduncle 8–26 mm (0.31–1.02 in) long, each branch of the peduncle with seven buds on pedicels up to 4 mm (0.16 in) long. Mature buds are oval, 8–9 mm (0.31–0.35 in) long and about 7 mm (0.28 in) wide with a flattened operculum that has a prominent central knob. The fruit is a woody barrel-shaped, urn-shaped or cylindrical capsule 10–17 mm (0.39–0.67 in) long and 9–16 mm (0.35–0.63 in) wide with the valves enclosed in the fruit.

== Taxonomy and naming ==
The yellowjacket was first formally described in 1991 by Ian Brooker and Anthony Bean in the journal Austrobaileya. It was given the name Eucalyptus aureola from specimens collected by Brooker on hills west of Lake Elphinstone in 1989. In 1995, Ken Hill and Lawrie Johnson changed its name to Corymbia aureola. The specific epithet (aureola) is from the diminutive form of the Latin word aureus meaning "golden", referring to the colour of the bark.

== Distribution and habitat ==
Corymbia aureola grows in skeletal soils on sandstone ridges, often with Acacia shirleyi, E. trachyphloia and E. papuana. It is only known from the Cherwell Range south of Moranbah, the Carborough Range west of Nebo and the Yellowjacket Ridge near Blackwater in central Queensland.

== Conservation status ==
This eucalypt is classified as "least concern" under the Queensland Government Nature Conservation Act 1992.

== See also ==
- List of Corymbia species
