= Suttor Developmental Road =

Road in Queensland, Australia

Suttor Developmental Road Queensland
- Suttor Developmental Road (green on black)

General information
- Type: Rural road
- Length: 162 km (101 mi)
- Built by: Dept. of Transport and Main Roads
- Route number(s): State Route 11

Major junctions
- SE end: Peak Downs Highway (State Route 70), Nebo
- Collinsville–Elphinstone Road
- NW end: Bowen Developmental Road (State Route 77), Mount Coolon

Location(s)
- Major settlements: Elphinstone

The Suttor Developmental Road is a state-controlled regional road (number 82A) part of which is rated as a local road of regional significance (LRRS). It is a highway in the east of the Australian state of Queensland. It runs in SE–NW direction and has a length of 162 km. It connects the Peak Downs Highway with the Bowen Developmental Road. It is signed as State Route 11.

== Route ==
The Suttor Developmental Road branches north of Nebo from the Peak Downs Highway (State Route 70) to the west and south of the Homevale National Park to the locality of Elphinstone, where it passes the exit to Collinsville–Elphinstone Road to the northwest.

The paved road ends at Elpinstone after which it hugs the western shore of Lake Elphinstone. Later it crosses the Isaac River. In the locality of Eaglefield it crosses the Suttor River, after which it is named. Finally, it reaches the locality of Mount Coolon at the Bowen Developmental Road (State Route 77).

== Major intersections ==
All distances are from Google Maps. The road is within the Isaac and Whitsunday local government areas.

LGA	Location	km	mi	Destinations	Notes
Isaac	Nebo	0	0.0	Peak Downs Highway – south – Coppabella – north – Epsom	Southeastern end of Suttor Developmental Road. Road runs west as State Route 11.
Isaac	Elphinstone	52.9	32.9	Collinsville–Elphinstone Road – northwest – Newlands	Road continues southwest, then south.
Whitsunday	Mount Coolon	162	101	Bowen Developmental Road – east – Newlands – southwest – Belyando	Northwestern end of Suttor Developmental Road.
1.000 mi = 1.609 km; 1.000 km = 0.621 mi

== Collinsville–Elphinstone Road ==
Collinsville–Elphinstone Road
- Location: Bowen Developmental Road, Newlands to Suttor Developmental Road, Elphinstone
- Length: 79.9 km (49.6 mi)

Collinsville–Elphinstone Road is a state-controlled district road (number 5307) rated as a local road of regional significance (LRRS). It runs from Newlands on the Bowen Developmental Road to Elphinstone on the Suttor Developmental Road, a distance of 79.9 kilometres (49.6 mi). It does not intersect with any state-controlled roads.

== Sources ==
Steve Parish: Australian Touring Atlas . Steve Parish Publishing. Archerfield QLD 2007. ISBN 978-1-74193-232-4 . p. 10
