= Strathfield, Queensland =

Strathfield
- Suburb
- Interactive map of Strathfield
- Coordinates: 21.7450°S 148.5411°E
- Country: Australia
- State: Queensland
- LGA: Isaac Region
- Location: 30.8 km (19.1 mi) NE of Coppabella; 45.9 km (28.5 mi) WSW of Nebo; 80.4 km (50.0 mi) ENE of Moranbah; 140 km (87 mi) SW of Mackay; 991 km (616 mi) NNW of Brisbane

Government
  - State electorate: Burdekin
  - Federal division: Capricornia

Area
  - Total: 688.3 km^{2} (265.8 sq mi)

Population
  - Total: 8 (2021 census)
  - Density: 0.0116/km^{2} (0.0301/sq mi)
- Time zone: UTC+10:00 (AEST)
- Postcode: 4742
Suburbs around Strathfield
Kemmis	Hail Creek	Nebo
Kemmis	Strathfield	Nebo
Coppabella	Oxford	Oxford

Strathfield is a rural locality in the Isaac Region, Queensland, Australia. In the 2021 census, Strathfield had a population of 8 people.

== Geography ==
The Peak Downs Highway passes through the locality from the south-west to the east. The Fitzroy Developmental Road runs south from the Peak Downs Highway. The Goonyella railway line passes through the locality from south-west to south-east with the Hall Creek branch line splitting off and proceeding through the locality and to the west. These railways serve two coal mines in the locality, Peabody Coppabella coal mine and BHP Billition Mitsui South Walker Creek coal mine.

Bee Creek and Copper Creek flow through the locality from the north to the south-east, eventually becoming tributaries of the Isaac River, which ultimately flows into the Fitzroy River to the Coral Sea.

Apart from the mines, the land use is predominantly grazing on native vegetation with a small amount of crop growing.

== History ==
The locality was officially named and bounded on 12 March 1999.

== Demographics ==
In the 2016 census, Strathfield had a population of 8 people.

In the 2021 census, Strathfield had a population of 8 people.

== Education ==
There are no schools in Strathfield. The nearest government primary schools are Nebo State School in neighbouring Nebo to the east (almost adjacent to the Strathfield-Nebo boundary) and Coppabella State School in neighbouring Coppabella to the south-west. There are no nearby secondary schools; the alternatives are distance education and boarding school.
