= Hail Creek, Queensland =

Rural locality in Queensland, Australia

Hail Creek
- Suburb
- Interactive map of Hail Creek
- Coordinates: 21.4386°S 148.3589°E
- Country: Australia
- State: Queensland
- LGA: Isaac Region
- Location: 41.8 km (26.0 mi) SE of Glenden; 143 km (89 mi) NE of Moranbah; 125 km (78 mi) SW of Mackay; 1,004 km (624 mi) NNW of Brisbane

Government
  - State electorate: Burdekin
  - Federal division: Capricornia

Area
  - Total: 891.3 km^{2} (344.1 sq mi)

Population
  - Total: 179 (2021 census)
  - Density: 0.2008/km^{2} (0.5201/sq mi)
- Time zone: UTC+10:00 (AEST)
- Postcode: 4742
Suburbs around Hail Creek
Turrawulla	Eungella Dam	Mount Britton
Glenden; Elphinstone	Hail Creek	Mount Britton
Kemmis	Strathfield	Nebo

Hail Creek is a rural locality in the Isaac Region, Queensland, Australia. In the 2021 census, Hail Creek had a population of 179 people.

== Geography ==
The Hail Creek coal mine is within the locality (21.490833°S 148.364167°E). It is operated by Glencore Australia.

The Suttor Developmental Road (State Route 11) runs through from the south-east (Nebo) to the south-west (Kemmis).

The Hail Creek branch of the Goonyella railway line enters the locality from the south-west (Kemmis) and terminates at the Hail Creek railway station on a balloon loop at the Hail Creek coal mine (21.4985°S 148.3675°E).

The Hail Creek Mine also has a heliport to the north-west of the railway station (21.4888°S 148.3586°E).

Hail Creek Mine is an heliport (21.4888°S 148.3586°E).

The locality contains the following mountains (from north to south):

- Bon Hill (21.3433°S 148.4645°E) 580 metres (1,900 ft)
- Mount Cona (21.3613°S 148.4233°E)
- Mount Andrew (21.3712°S 148.4105°E) 500 metres (1,600 ft)
- Mount Robert (21.3737°S 148.4917°E) 594 metres (1,949 ft)
- Mount Cristoe (21.4442°S 148.3191°E) 455 metres (1,493 ft)
- The Peak (21.5518°S 148.5178°E) 389 metres (1,276 ft)

The Homevale National Park is in the north-east of the locality extending into neighbouring Mount Britton (21.43583°S 148.52139°E). The national park features cliffs and peaks in a vast dry landscape. There are a number of important fossil sites.

Apart from the national park and the coal mine, the land use is predominantly grazing on native vegetation with a small amount of crop growing in the east of the locality around Oaky Creek.

== History ==
Hard granite formations were created by a series of volcanic eruptions 30 million years ago which covered older basalt rocks with lava. As the basalt erodes more easily, the remaining formations are visually dramatic. Fossils found in the area have been dated back to the Permian period between 280-225 million years ago.

Homevale National Park was previously the Homevale pastoral station where cattle were grazed. Te national park was gazetted in 1995 under the Nature Conservation Act 1992 by regulation, Nature Conservation (Protected Areas) Amendment (No.5) 1995. Its area was extended in 1996, 2009, and 2024. As at 2024, the homestead of the Homevale pastoral station remains within the national park on Homevale Homestead Road (21.4399°S 148.5259°E) and conservation plans are to be developed for it.

== Demographics ==
In the 2016 census, Hail Creek had a population of 148 people.

In the 2021 census, Hail Creek had a population of 179 people.

== Economy ==
Apart from the mine, the locality has a number of homesteads (from north to south):

- Exevale (21.2934°S 148.3081°E)
- Carrinyah (21.4835°S 148.5337°E)
- Fort Cooper (21.5615°S 148.4527°E) with its airstrip (21.5641°S 148.4486°E).

== Education ==
There are no schools in Hail Creek. The nearest government primary schools are Nebo State School in neighbouring Nebo to the south-east, Glenden State School in neighbouring Glenden to the west, and Eungella State School in Eungella to the north. The nearest government secondary school is Glenden State School (to Year 12), but some parts of Hail Creek would be too distant from this school and the alternatives would be distance education and boarding school.
