= Nebo Hotel =

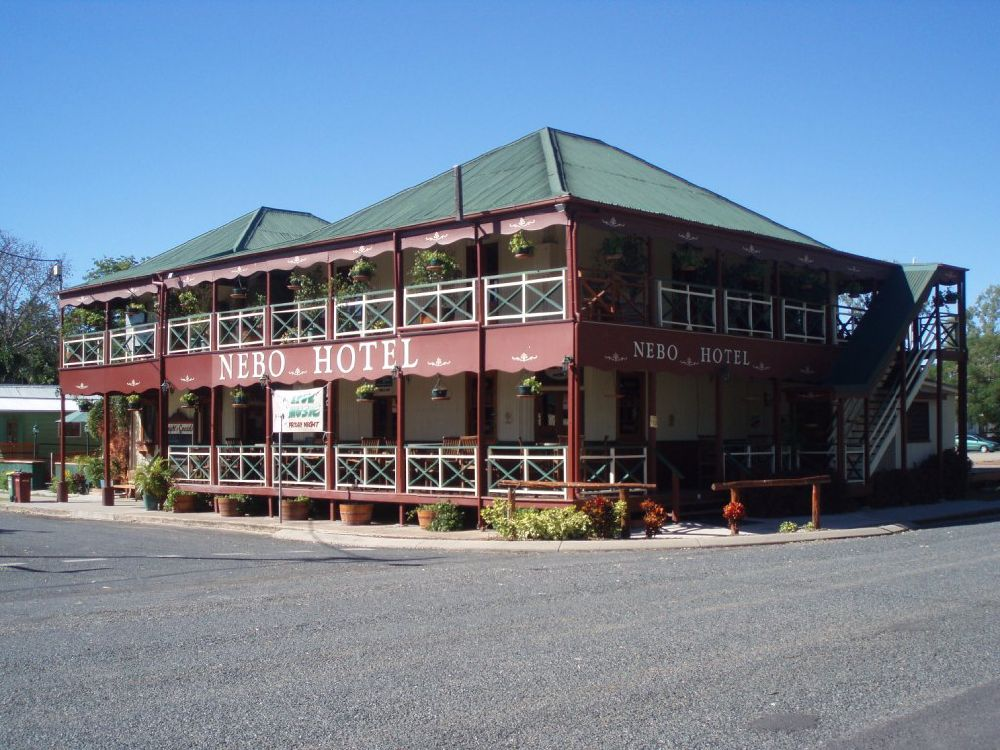
- Nebo Hotel, 2009

- Location within Queensland Location within Australia
- 21.6894°S 148.6883°E
- Location: 2 Reynolds Street, Nebo, Isaac Region, Queensland, Australia

History
- Design period: 1870s–1890s (late 19th century)
- Built: 1886
- Built for: Jack Davis

Queensland Heritage Register
- Official name: Nebo Hotel, Fort Cooper Hotel
- Type: state heritage (built)
- Designated: 27 October 2000
- Reference no.: 601154
- Significant period: 1880s–1930s (fabric); 1886–ongoing (historical use)
- Significant components: cold room/cold store, residential accommodation – manager's house/quarters

Nebo Hotel, also known as Fort Cooper Hotel, is a heritage-listed hotel at 2 Reynolds Street, Nebo, Isaac Region, Queensland, Australia. It was built in 1886 and was added to the Queensland Heritage Register on 27 October 2000.

== History ==
The Nebo Hotel, believed to be the second hotel on the site, was constructed in 1886 for Jack Davis who owned the hotel until 1906.

Ludwig Leichhardt first explored the area around Nebo in 1845. By the early 1860s pastoral expansion was pushing up the coast from Rockhampton towards land in the Mitchell and Kennedy districts and beyond. Land at a crossing on the Nebo Creek where good water and grass were available became a popular overnight camp for teamsters and other travellers. In 1862, Ben Reynolds, one of a party who crossed the Eton Range with a bullock dray, established a hotel on the banks of the creek. A licence for this hotel was granted in early 1863. Two years later the area around it was surveyed by TH Fitzgerald and gazetted as a township. It was called Fort Cooper after the hill that is a prominent landscape feature in the area and the hotel was named the Fort Cooper Hotel. The local people, however, had already begun to call the settlement Nebo, after the creek on which it was based.

Fort Cooper was intended as a service centre for the surrounding pastoral area. From the 1870s it also served a number of copper mines and the Mount Britton gold mine from the 1880s. Fort Cooper quickly prospered gaining a second hotel, a telegraph office and a Court of Petty Sessions. However, the population of the area dropped somewhat in the late 1860s as stations replaced sheep with cattle, which did not require as many hands to care for them. In 1886, Jack Davis, who also built a residence and store across from the hotel six years later, built the current hotel and retained the name.

In 1906, Davis sold the hotel to Jim Perry, who later sold it to Henry Richard Marshall. The place was again sold in 1918 when the German owner found that prejudice affected his trade.

In 1920 the license was acquired by Alexander William Maclean. A number of his 13 children were born at the hotel and it has been a long association with the Maclean family. Maclean had a great interest in horse racing and for most of the time that he owned the hotel he was President of the Nebo Jockey Club. The hotel catered for race meetings and there were once stables and a stockyard on the grounds.

The adjoining two storey building that forms part of the hotel and linked by the hotel's eastern verandas, was built in two stages. The ground floor was constructed following the First World War as a billiard room. The upper storey was added in 1932 as private living quarters.

In 1939 Maclean sold the hotel owing to ill health. It was purchased by Tom Wright and Herb Davidson and was operated by various licensees. In 1948, local usage concerning the name of the town finally prevailed and both the township and hotel were renamed Nebo. In 1962 Jim Maclean leased the hotel and purchased it in 1964. His daughter took over the running of the hotel in 1991. The property has been sold twice since 1994.

Changes have been minor. The most noticeable exterior change has been the removal of the timber veranda deck to the Reynolds Street side and the installation of low steps to provide access to the bar and the side verandas. The timber rail balustrade was replaced on the ground floor by horizontal weatherboards. In appearance the hotel is both typical of its era and an increasing rarity.

== Description ==
The Nebo Hotel is situated at the corner of two major streets in the town, Reynolds and Water Streets, overlooking Nebo Creek. The hotel consists of two adjacent buildings. The older, larger corner building with bar at ground floor and guest bedrooms on first floor. The adjoining building houses the dining room and kitchen on its lower level with management accommodation over.

The main building is two storey, timber framed with green painted corrugated iron to the hip roof with skillion veranda awnings on three sides. External walls are clad with painted vertical corrugated iron. The former front section of the timber deck veranda has been removed, the lower level open rail balustrade replaced with weatherboards and steps added to access the bar. At the upper level the cross braced open balustrade remains as does the decorative fascia boards. Timber posts support the timber deck veranda which provides access to the tongue and groove-lined guest bedrooms through individual French doors. Behind the public bar stands an old hardwood insulated coolroom which is claimed to produce excellent temperature beer.

The adjoining building, situated to the east of the main hotel, is two storeyed with a painted corrugated galvanised iron hip roof. Originally single storeyed it is externally clad with painted vertical corrugated iron on the lower storey and ripple iron to the upper. The dining room has timber double hung windows and is lined with an early fibro sheeting. A skillion roofed veranda to the first floor level on the street elevation has been enclosed with flat fibro cladding. The living quarters behind it have recently been lined internally.

== Heritage listing ==
Nebo Hotel was listed on the Queensland Heritage Register on 27 October 2000 having satisfied the following criteria.

The place is important in demonstrating the evolution or pattern of Queensland's history.

Nebo Hotel, erected in 1886, is important in demonstrating the evolution and pattern of Queensland's history standing, as it does, close to a creek crossing on what was a track utilised by explorers, pastoralists and settlers seeking land in the Mitchell and Kennedy Regions of north Queensland. Further, the hotel remains as an extant reminder of the time when Nebo was a service centre for the pastoral and mining areas surrounding the town.

The place is important in demonstrating the principal characteristics of a particular class of cultural places.

The Nebo Hotel is significant as a relatively intact example of a nineteenth century timber and iron vernacular hotel which is representative of its type and era of construction.
