= Turrawulla, Queensland =

Turrawulla
- Suburb
- Interactive map of Turrawulla
- Coordinates: 21.1172°S 148.1188°E
- Country: Australia
- State: Queensland
- LGA: Isaac Region
- Location: 55.8 km (34.7 mi) W of Eungella; 164 km (102 mi) W of Mackay; 181 km (112 mi) NNE of Moranbah; 1,037 km (644 mi) NNW of Brisbane

Government
  - State electorate: Burdekin
  - Federal division: Capricornia

Area
  - Total: 892.9 km^{2} (344.8 sq mi)

Population
  - Total: 0 (2021 census)
  - Density: 0.0000/km^{2} (0.0000/sq mi)
- Time zone: UTC+10:00 (AEST)
- Postcode: 4742
Suburbs around Turrawulla
Newlands	Newlands	Eungella Hinterland
Newlands	Turrawulla	Eungella Dam
Glenden	Hail Creek	Hail Creek

Turrawulla is a rural locality in the Isaac Region, Queensland, Australia. In the 2021 census, Turrawulla had "no people or a very low population".

== Geography ==
Turrawulla has the following mountains (from north to south):

- Mount Dingo (21.0798°S 148.2858°E) 700 metres (2,300 ft)
- Mount Conical (21.1076°S 148.2468°E) 479 metres (1,572 ft)
- Mount Blenheim (21.1312°S 148.2910°E) 636 metres (2,087 ft)
- Mount Hillalong (21.2936°S 148.2852°E) 460 metres (1,510 ft)
- Limestone Hill (21.3014°S 148.1656°E) 526 metres (1,726 ft)

Redcliffe Tableland National Park is in the west of the locality. Apart from this protected area, the land use is predominantly grazing on native vegetation.

== Demographics ==
In the 2016 census, Turrawulla had a population of 7 people.

In the 2021 census, Turrawulla had "no people or a very low population".

== Education ==
There are no schools in Turrawulla. The nearest government primary school is Eungella State School in Eungella to the east. There are no nearby secondary schools; the alternatives are distance education and boarding school.
