= Hail Creek =

Hail Creek may refer to:

- Hail Creek, Queensland, a locality in the Isaac Region, Australia
  - Hail Creek coal mine, a mine within that locality
