= Eaglefield, Queensland =

Eaglefield
- Suburb
- Interactive map of Eaglefield
- Coordinates: 21.4691°S 147.7888°E
- Country: Australia
- State: Queensland
- LGA: Isaac Region
- Location: 75.8 km (47.1 mi) SW of Glenden; 89.3 km (55.5 mi) NNW of Moranbah; 192 km (119 mi) WSW of Mackay; 435 km (270 mi) NW of Rockhampton; 1,070 km (660 mi) NNW of Brisbane

Government
  - State electorate: Burdekin
  - Federal division: Capricornia

Area
  - Total: 535.9 km^{2} (206.9 sq mi)

Population
  - Total: 0 (2021 census)
  - Density: 0.0000/km^{2} (0.0000/sq mi)
- Time zone: UTC+10:00 (AEST)
- Postcode: 4742
Suburbs around Eaglefield
Mount Coolon	Suttor	Glenden
Mount Coolon	Eaglefield	Burton
Pasha	Pasha	Moranbah

Eaglefield is a rural locality in the Isaac Region, Queensland, Australia. In the 2021 census, Eaglefield had "no people or a very low population".

== Geography ==
The Suttor River forms the western boundary of the locality. The Suttor Developmental Road passes through the locality from east (Burton) to west (Mount Coolon) crossing the Suttor River on the western boundary. The Goonyella – Abbot Point line (GAP railway line) passes through the locality from north (Suttor) to south-east (Moranbah) to service the North Goonyella coal mine in Moranbah. The Suttor Creek railway station serves the locality (21.4110°S 147.8619°E).

The land is a mixture of freehold and leasehold and mostly has been cleared for low density cattle grazing; however, mining activities have been proposed for the locality.

== Demographics ==
In the 2016 census, Eaglefield had "no people or a very low population".

In the 2021 census, Eaglefield had "no people or a very low population".

== Education ==
There are no schools in Eaglefield. The nearest school is Glenden State School in neighbouring Glenden to the north-east, which provides both primary and secondary schooling (Prep to Year 12). However, it would be too distant for students in the southern parts of Eaglefield to attend; the alternatives are distance education and boarding school.
