= Burton, Queensland =

Burton
- Suburb
- Interactive map of Burton
- Coordinates: 21.59°S 148.0725°E
- Country: Australia
- State: Queensland
- LGA: Isaac Region
- Location: 42.8 km (26.6 mi) S of Glenden; 73.7 km (45.8 mi) NNE of Moranbah; 157 km (98 mi) SW of Mackay; 1,046 km (650 mi) NNW of Brisbane

Government
  - State electorate: Burdekin
  - Federal division: Capricornia

Area
  - Total: 1,087.4 km^{2} (419.8 sq mi)

Population
  - Total: 7 (2021 census)
  - Density: 0.0064/km^{2} (0.0167/sq mi)
- Time zone: UTC+10:00 (AEST)
- Postcode: 4742
Suburbs around Burton
| Eaglefield | Glenden | Elphinstone |
| Moranbah | Burton | Kemmis |
| Moranbah | Moranbah | Coppabella |

Burton is a rural locality in the Isaac Region, Queensland, Australia. In the 2021 census, Burton had a population of 7 people.

== Geography ==
The Burton Range is in the centre of the locality with a north-south orientation.

Burton sits on a major coal deposit in the Bowen Basin. There are a number of coal mines operating there (and beyond into adjacent localities), including Burton Coal Mine (including Burton, Broadmeadow, Wallanbah pits), Lancewood, Wards Well, West Burton, New Lenton, Kerlong, Burton, Plumtree, Ironbark No 1, and Talwood. The Goonyella railway line provides transport from the mines to the ports.

Apart from mining, the predominant land use is grazing on native vegetation.

== History ==
The locality was named and bounded on 12 March 1999.

== Demographics ==
In the 2016 census, Burton had a population of 29 people.

In the 2021 census, Burton had a population of 7 people.

== Education ==
There are no schools in Burton. The nearest government primary schools are Glenden State School in neighbouring Glenden to the north, Moranbah State School in neighbouring Moranbah to the south, and Coppabella State School in neighbouring Coppabella to the south-east. The nearest government secondary schools are Glenden State School (to Year 12) in Glenden and Moranbah State High School (to Year 12) in Moranbah.

== Attractions ==
Boveys Lookout is a tourist attraction (21.5594°S 148.0617°E) in the north of the Burton Range at an altitude of 538 metres (1,765 ft) above sea level.
