= Shire of Nebo =

Coordinates: 21°41′18.25″S 148°41′26.24″E

- Local government area
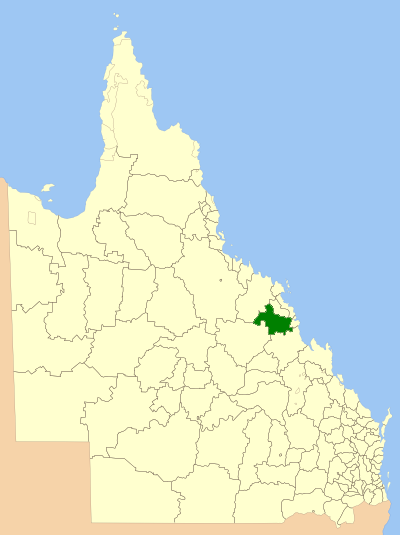
- Location within Queensland

- Country: Australia
- State: Queensland
- Region: Central Queensland
- Established: 1883
- Council seat: Nebo

Government
  - Mayor: Bob Oakes

Area
  - Total: 10,034.6 km^{2} (3,874.4 sq mi)

Population
  - Total: 2,522 (2006 census)
  - Density: 0.25133/km^{2} (0.65094/sq mi)
LGAs around Shire of Nebo
Bowen	Mirani	Mackay
Belyando	Shire of Nebo	Sarina
Belyando	Broadsound	Broadsound

The Shire of Nebo was a local government area in Central Queensland, Queensland, Australia, about 80 kilometres (50 mi) south-west of the regional city of Mackay. The Shire, administered from the town of Nebo, covered an area of 10,034.6 square kilometres (3,874.4 sq mi), and existed as a local government entity from 1883 until 2008, when it was amalgamated with the Shires of Belyando and Broadsound to form the Isaac Region.

Traditionally a rural area, producing beef, sugar, sorghum and other grains, coal mining is now a major employer, with eight coal mines in the area and capacity for a further five.

== History ==
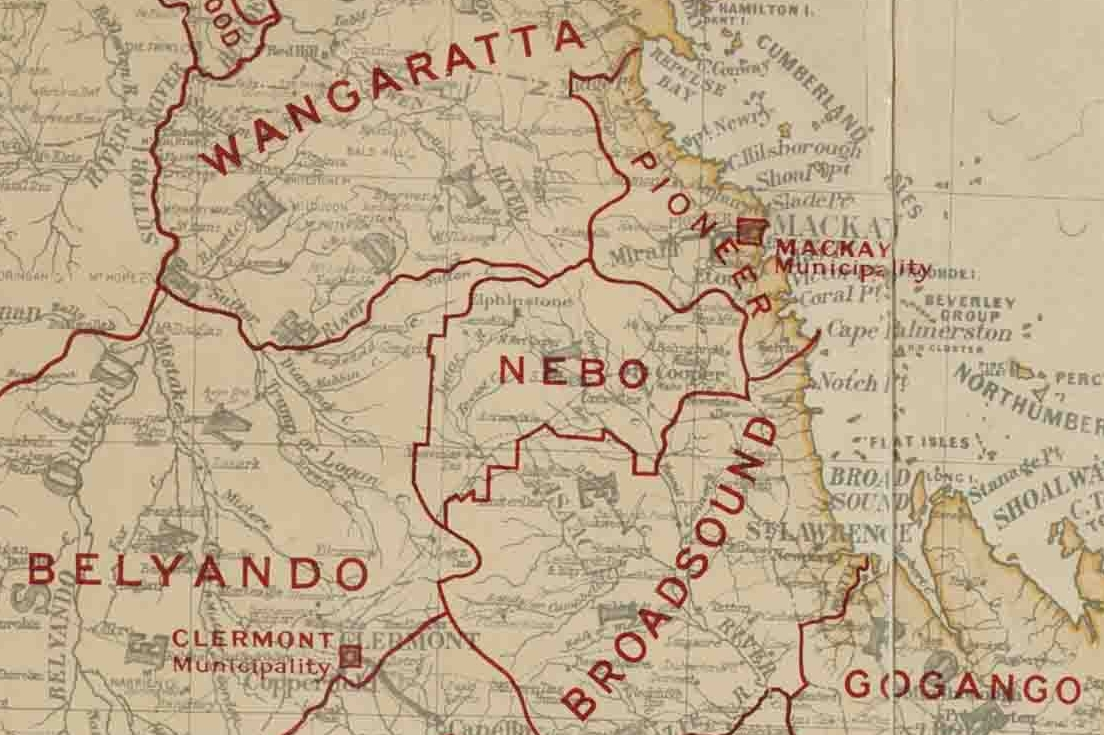
Map of Nebo Division and adjacent local government areas, March 1902

The area was first explored by Europeans when Ludwig Leichhardt came in 1845, and was named Nebo by William Landsborough in 1856.

On 11 November 1879, the Broadsound Division was established as one of 74 divisions around Queensland under the Divisional Boards Act 1879. Following a short-lived gold rush in the area, on 7 February 1883, part of subdivisions 2 and 3 of Broadsound Division were separated to create Nebo Division.

With the passage of the Local Authorities Act 1902, Nebo Division became the Shire of Nebo on 31 March 1903.

On 15 March 2008, under the Local Government (Reform Implementation) Act 2007 passed by the Parliament of Queensland on 10 August 2007, Nebo merged with the Shires of Belyando and Broadsound to form the Isaac Region.

== Towns and localities ==
The Shire of Nebo included the following settlements:

- Nebo
- Coppabella
- Elphinstone
- Glenden
- Suttor

== Chairmen ==
- 1908: William Conyngham Ussher
- 1927: J. Dillon

== Population ==
Year	Population
1933	394
1947	534
1954	447
1961	575
1966	479
1971	777
1976	800
1981	914
1986	2,352
1991	2,634
1996	2,462
2001	2,529
2006	2,522
