= Pasha, Queensland =

Pasha
- Suburb
- Interactive map of Pasha
- Coordinates: 21.7905°S 147.4572°E
- Country: Australia
- State: Queensland
- LGA: Isaac Region
- Location: 80.1 km (49.8 mi) NW of Moranbah; 278 km (173 mi) WSW of Mackay; 1,118 km (695 mi) NNW of Brisbane

Government
  - State electorate: Burdekin
  - Federal division: Capricornia

Area
  - Total: 2,351.1 km^{2} (907.8 sq mi)

Population
  - Total: 75 (2021 census)
  - Density: 0.03190/km^{2} (0.0826/sq mi)
- Time zone: UTC+10:00 (AEST)
- Postcode: 4721
Suburbs around Pasha
Mount Coolon	Mount Coolon	Eaglefield
Belyando	Pasha	Moranbah
Frankfield	Kilcummin	Moranbah

Pasha is a rural locality in the Isaac Region, Queensland, Australia. In the 2021 census, Pasha had a population of 75 people.

== History ==
Pasha State School opened on 22 May 1975 and closed on 9 December 1977.

== Demographics ==
In the 2016 census, Pasha had a population of 50 people.

In the 2021 census, Pasha had a population of 75 people.

== Education ==
There are no schools in Pasha. The nearest government primary schools are Moranbah State School in neighbouring Moranbah to the east and Kilcummin State School in neighbouring Kilcummin to the south. The nearest government secondary school is Moranbah State High School, also in Moranbah. However, most of Pasha is too distant from these schools for a daily commute; the alternatives are distance education and boarding school.
