= Mount Britton =

Mount Britton may be:

- Mount Britton, Queensland, a former mining town and now ghost town in Australia
- Mount Britton (Puerto Rico)
- Mount Britton, South Australia
- Mount Britton, British Columbia
