= Shire of Bowen =

- Local government area
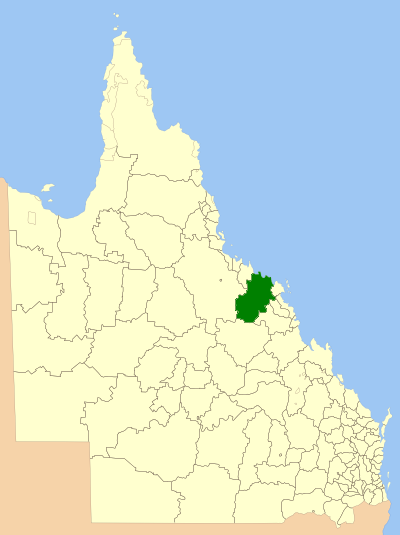
- Location within Queensland

- Country: Australia
- State: Queensland
- Region: North Queensland
- Established: 1879
- Council seat: Bowen

Area
  - Total: 21,184.4 km^{2} (8,179.3 sq mi)

Population
  - Total: 12,377 (2006 census)
  - Density: 0.584251/km^{2} (1.51320/sq mi)
LGAs around Shire of Bowen
Burdekin	Coral Sea	Whitsunday
Dalrymple	Shire of Bowen	Mirani
Dalrymple	Belyando	Nebo

The Shire of Bowen was a local government area in the North Queensland region of Queensland, Australia. The shire, administered from the town of Bowen, covered an area of 21,184.4 square kilometres (8,179.3 sq mi), and existed as a local government entity from 1879 until 2008, when it amalgamated with the Shire of Whitsunday to form the Whitsunday Region.

The Shire's economy was based on tropical agriculture, fishing, tourism and coal mining.

== History ==
The Shire of Bowen had its origins in two entities:

- the Borough of Bowen which was constituted as a municipality on 7 August 1863 under the Municipalities Act 1858 to provide local government within the urban area of Bowen
- the Wangaratta Division which was created on 11 November 1879 as one of 74 divisions around Queensland under the Divisional Boards Act 1879 to provide local government in the rural areas surrounding Bowen

With the passage of the Local Authorities Act 1902, the Borough of Bowen became the Town of Bowen and Wangaratta Division became the Shire of Wangaratta on 31 March 1903.

On 2 April 1960, the Town of Bowen was abolished, and merged into the Shire of Wangaratta, which was renamed Shire of Bowen.

On 15 March 2008, under the Local Government (Reform Implementation) Act 2007 passed by the Parliament of Queensland on 10 August 2007, the Shire of Bowen merged with the Shire of Whitsunday to form the Whitsunday Region.

== Towns and localities ==
The Shire of Bowen included the following settlements:

- Bowen
- Collinsville
- Binbee
- Bogie
- Brisk Bay
- Gumlu
- Guthalungra
- Inveroona
- Merinda
- Mount Coolon
- Mount Wyatt
- Newlands
- Queens Beach
- Scottville
- Springlands

== Chairmen and mayors ==
=== Mayor of Borough/Town of Bowen ===
- 1908: Malcolm Gillies
- 1927: T. B. Edwards
- (10 years): John Edward Kelly

=== Mayor of Bowen Shire ===
- 1997–2008: Mike Brunker

== Population ==
Year	Population
1933	7,543
1947	8,083
1954	8,518
1961	9,491
1966	9,342
1971	10,231
1976	11,292
1981	13,645
1986	14,364
1991	14,161
1996	14,411
2001	13,698
2006	14,625
