= Nebo, Queensland =

Nebo
- Town
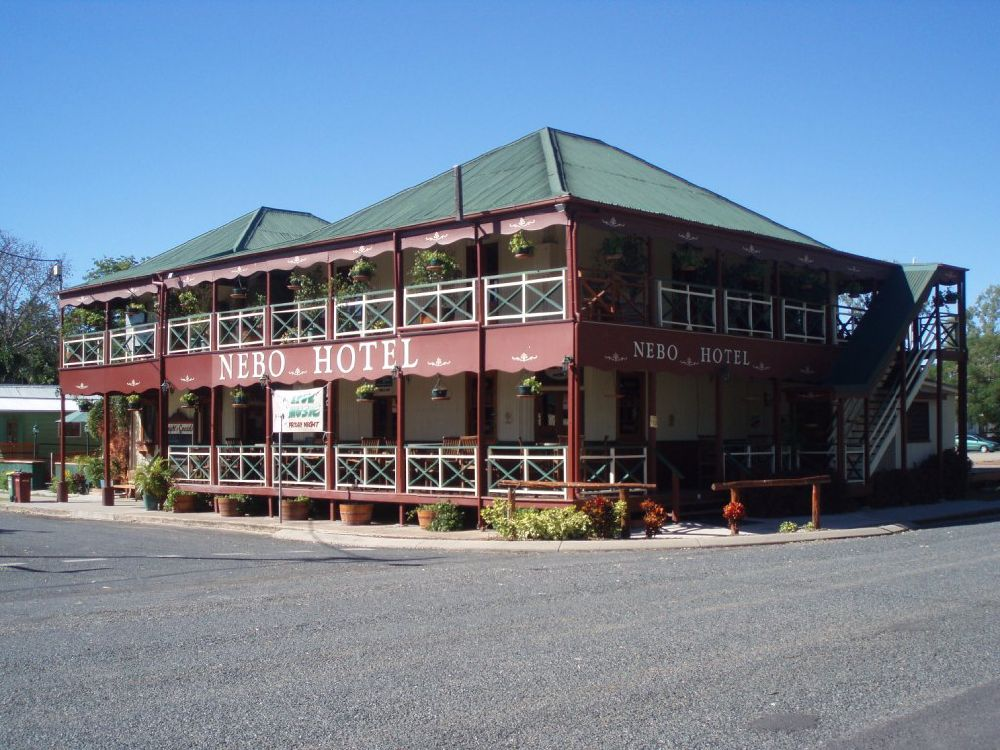
- Nebo Hotel, 2009

- Interactive map of Nebo
- Coordinates: 21.6897°S 148.6913°E
- Country: Australia
- State: Queensland
- LGA: Isaac Region
- Location: 85.4 km (53.1 mi) SE of Glenden; 86.6 km (53.8 mi) SW of Sarina; 92.8 km (57.7 mi) SW of Mackay; 944 km (587 mi) NNW of Brisbane

Government
  - State electorate: Burdekin
  - Federal division: Capricornia

Area
  - Total: 877.0 km^{2} (338.6 sq mi)

Population
  - Total: 857 (2021 census)
  - Density: 0.9772/km^{2} (2.5309/sq mi)
- Time zone: UTC+10:00 (AEST)
- Postcode: 4742
Localities around Nebo
Mount Britton	Epsom	Blue Mountain
Hail Creek	Nebo	Koumala
Strathfield	Oxford	Oxford

Nebo is a rural town and locality in the Isaac Region, Queensland, Australia. In the 2021 census, the locality of Nebo had a population of 857 people.

== Geography ==
The town of Nebo is situated on the western edge of the locality on Nebo Creek. The Peak Downs Highway enters the locality from the south-west (Strathfield), passes through the town, and exits to the north (Epsom). The Suttor Developmental Road commences at the Peak Downs Highway in the north-west of the locality and exits the locality to the west (Hail Creek). The Marlborough–Sarina Road runs along the eastern boundary.

== History ==
Baradha (also known as Barada, Toolginburra, Baradaybahrad, Thararraburra, Toolginburra, Baradha) is an Australian Aboriginal language spoken by the Baradha people. The Baradha language region includes the locality of Lotus Creek and extends along the inland ranges towards Nebo and extends along the Connors River catchment.

Biri (also known as Birri) is a language of Central and North Queensland. Biri refers to a language chain extending from Central Queensland towards Townsville and is often used as a universal name for other languages and/or dialects across the region. The language area includes the towns of Bowen, Ayr, Collinsville and Nebo.

William Landsborough explored the district in 1857. He named the district after the Babylonian god Nabu (Hebrew: Nebo). Although the name Nebo was widely used for the town, the official name was Fort Cooper until it was eventually changed to Nebo in 1923.

Pastoralists settled in the Nebo region as early as the 1860s.

Fort Cooper was used as a Native Police barracks from 1862 until 1878. Officers such as Robert Arthur Johnstone were deployed to this post and their efficiency in "arresting the depredations" of the Aboriginal people were appreciated by the local residents and squatters.

The Nebo Post Office opened on 1 January 1864.

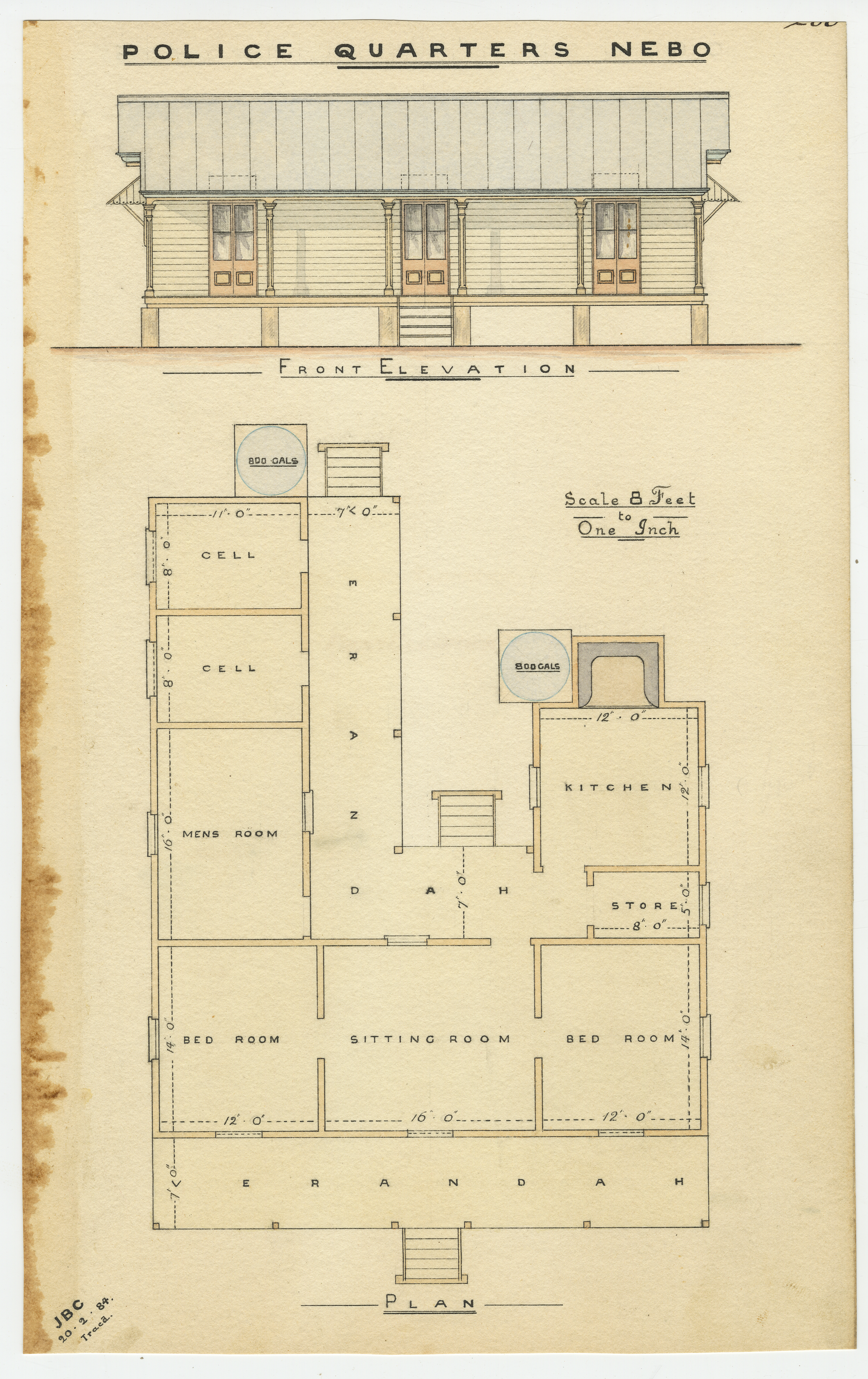
Architectural drawing of the Nebo Police Quarters, 1884

The Nebo Court of Petty Sessions opened on 29 January 1866. The Nebo Small Debts Court opened on 31 December 1867. Following the Magistrates Courts Act 1921, the Small Debts Court became the Nebo Magistrates Court on 3 April 1922. On 31 December 1964, the Court of Petty Sessions was absorbed into the Magistrates Court. The Magistrates Court closed on 20 December 1990.

The Nebo Police Station opened in February 1867. In December 1886 new police quarters were built.

Nebo Provisional School opened on 29 June 1874. It became Nebo State School in 1909.

In 1957, a memorial stone was erected in the Nebo Shire to honour William Landsborough.

The Nebo Library facility opened in 1969.

Nebo was the administrative centre for the Shire of Nebo until 2008 when the Shire was amalgamated with the Shire of Belyando and the Shire of Broadsound to form the Isaac Region. The Isaac Region is administered from Moranbah, but has council offices in Nebo.

The William Landsborough Diaries (1856–1886) were ranked #39 in the ‘Top 150: Documenting Queensland’ exhibition when it toured to venues around Queensland from February 2009 to April 2010. The exhibition was part of Queensland State Archives’ events and exhibition program which contributed to the state’s Q150 celebrations, marking the 150th anniversary of the separation of Queensland from New South Wales.

== Demographics ==
In the 2006 census, the town of Nebo had a population of 850 people.

In the 2011 census, the locality of Nebo had a population of 840 people.

In the 2016 census, the locality of Nebo had a population of 753 people.

In the 2021 census, the locality of Nebo had a population of 857 people.

== Heritage listings ==
Nebo has a number of heritage-listed sites, including:

- Nebo Hotel, 2 Reynolds Street (21.6894°S 148.6883°E)

== Economy ==
The local economy has traditionally relied on coal-mining as it plays a significant role in the local economy, with eleven coal mines located in the Nebo district.

== Education ==
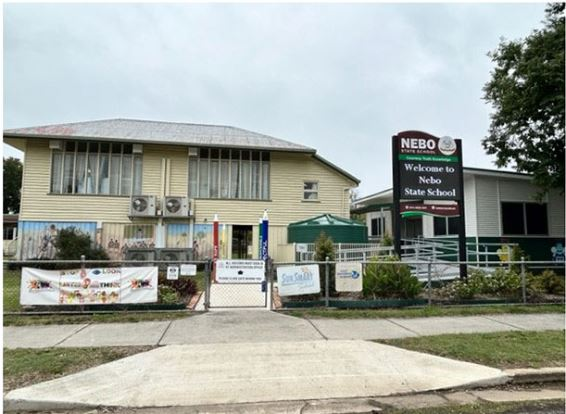
Nebo State School, 2025

Nebo State School is a government primary (Prep–6) school for boys and girls at 34 Oxford Street (21.6897°S 148.6898°E). In 2014, the school had an enrolment of 63 children with 4 teachers. In 2018, the school had an enrolment of 61 students with 5 teachers (4 full-time equivalent) and 8 non-teaching staff (5 full-time equivalent).

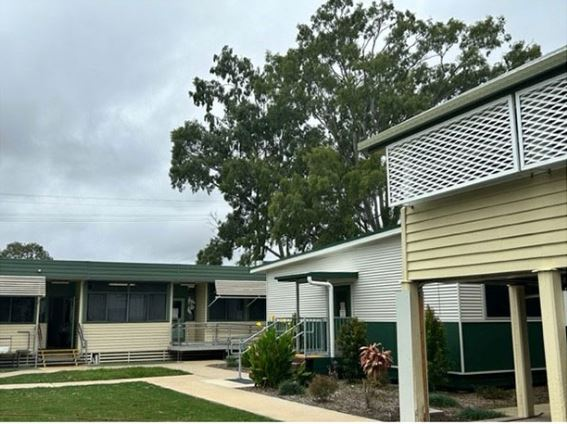
Nebo State School, 2025

There are no secondary schools in Nebo. The nearest government secondary schools are Sarina State High School (7–12) in Sarina to the north-east and Glenden State School (Prep–12) in Glenden to the north-west. Given the distances involved, distance education and boarding school are alternatives.

== Amenities ==
The Isaac Regional Council operates a public library at 10 Reynolds Street.

The Nebo Sarina Range branch of the Queensland Country Women's Association meets at 1994 Marlborough Sarina Road, Sarina Range.
