= Mount Britton, Queensland =

Mount Britton
- Suburb
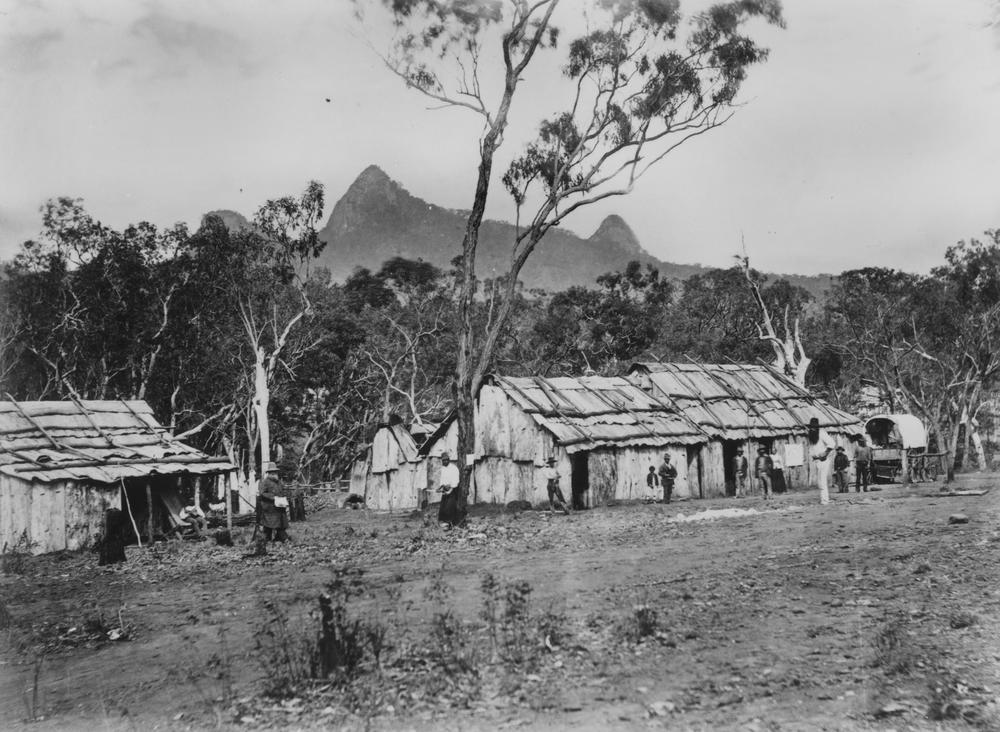
- Royal Mail Hotel and doctor's cottage, Mount Britton Goldfield, circa 1881

- Interactive map of Mount Britton
- Coordinates: 21.4186°S 148.5997°E
- Country: Australia
- State: Queensland
- LGA: Isaac Region
- Location: 50.1 km (31.1 mi) N of Nebo; 131 km (81 mi) SW of Mackay; 150 km (93 mi) NE of Moranbah; 994 km (618 mi) NNW of Brisbane
- Established: 1881

Government
  - State electorate: Burdekin
  - Federal division: Capricornia

Area
  - Total: 398.3 km^{2} (153.8 sq mi)

Population
  - Total: 4 (2021 census)
  - Density: 0.0100/km^{2} (0.026/sq mi)
- Time zone: UTC+10:00 (AEST)
- Postcode: 4742
Suburbs around Mount Britton
Eungella Dam	Crediton	Septimus
Hail Creek	Mount Britton	Pinevale
Hail Creek	Nebo	Epsom

Mount Britton (originally Mount Britten) is a rural locality in the Isaac Region, Queensland, Australia. It contains the abandoned gold rush town of Mount Britton in the former Nebo Shire. In the 2021 census, Mount Britton had a population of 4 people.

The Mount Britton area was part of the traditional lands occupied by the Wiri Aboriginal people. Native title was first applied for in 2006 and legally recognised on 31 July 2019.

== Geography ==
The terrain is mountainous with a number of named peaks (from north to south):

- The Stalk (21.3103°S 148.4895°E) 660 metres (2,170 ft)
- Sydney Heads (21.4152°S 148.5798°E) 921 metres (3,022 ft)
- The Marling Spikes (21.4191°S 148.5633°E) 723 metres (2,372 ft)
- Mount Seaview (21.4414°S 148.7112°E) 860 metres (2,820 ft)
- Mount Britton (21.4691°S 148.5790°E) 727 metres (2,385 ft)
- Mount Adder (21.4864°S 148.7219°E) 712 metres (2,336 ft)
- Boundary Gap Mountain (21.5071°S 148.7146°E) 700 metres (2,300 ft)

Dullawunna is a neighbourhood in the west of the locality (21.4333°S 148.5333°E).

== History ==
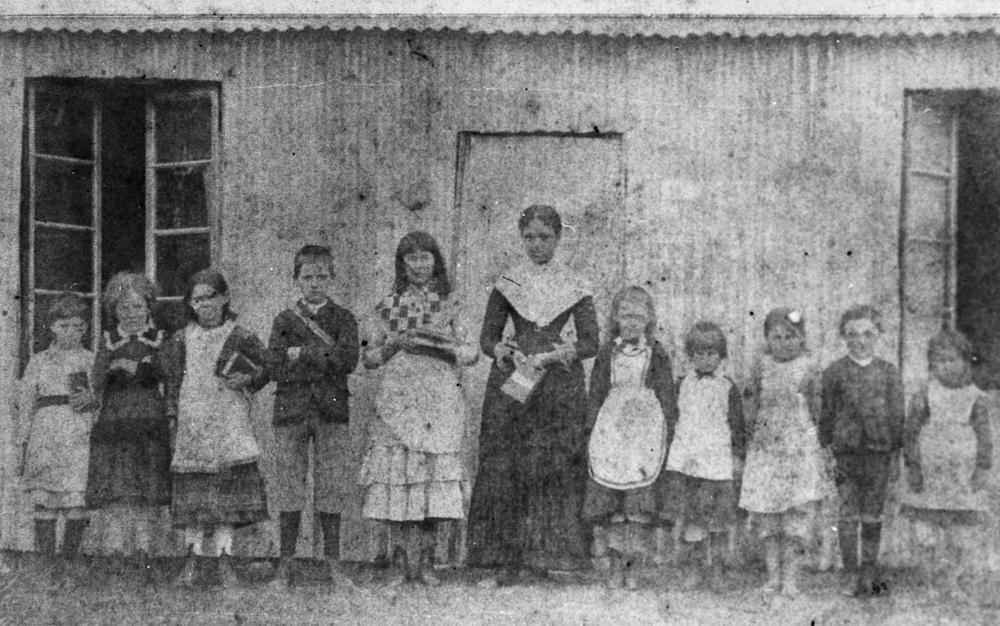
School children and teacher portrait at the Provisional School, Mount Britton, 1885

The township began in 1881 with the discovery of a gold field and, at its height, had a population of 1500 inhabitants.

Mount Britten Post Office opened on 1 June 1881 and closed in 1912. Mount Britten Provisional School opened c. 1883 and closed in 1906.

After alluvial and shallow reef gold diminished by the late 1880s, the town experienced a decline and was eventually abandoned.

The former township is now a historical site at the end of Mount Britton Road (21.4035°S 148.5452°E).

== Demographics ==
In the 2006 census, the locality of Mount Britton and the surrounding area had a population of 255 people.

In the 2016 census, the locality of Mount Britton had a population of 9 people.

In the 2021 census, the locality of Mount Britton had a population of 4 people.

== Education ==
There are no schools in Mount Britton. The nearest government primary school is Nebo State School in neighbouring Nebo to the south. There are no nearby secondary schools; distance education or boarding schools are the alternatives.

== See also ==
- List of ghost towns
