= Shire of Wangaratta =

Shire of Wangaratta may refer to:

- Shire of Wangaratta (Queensland), a former local government area in Queensland, Australia
- Shire of Wangaratta (Victoria), a former local government area in Victoria, Australia
