= Laglan, Queensland =

Laglan
- Suburb
- Interactive map of Laglan
- Coordinates: 22.425°S 146.4313°E
- Country: Australia
- State: Queensland
- LGA: Isaac Region
- Location: 191 km (119 mi) NE of Aramac; 211 km (131 mi) NW of Clermont; 310 km (190 mi) W of Moranbah; 429 km (267 mi) WSW of Mackay; 1,160 km (720 mi) NNW of Brisbane

Government
  - State electorate: Burdekin
  - Federal division: Capricornia

Area
  - Total: 3,169.7 km^{2} (1,223.8 sq mi)

Population
  - Total: 21 (2021 census)
  - Density: 0.00663/km^{2} (0.0172/sq mi)
- Time zone: UTC+10:00 (AEST)
- Postcode: 4721
Suburbs around Laglan
Pentland	Belyando	Elgin
Aramac	Laglan	Frankfield
Jericho	Alpha	Clermont

Laglan is a rural locality in the Isaac Region, Queensland, Australia. In the 2021 census, Laglan had a population of 21 people.

== Geography ==
The Great Dividing Range runs roughly along the western boundary of Laglan.

Laglan has the following mountains in the east of the locality:

- Mount Donnybrook (22.5230°S 146.7476°E) at 502 metres (1,647 ft) above sea level
- The Nunnery (22.5921°S 146.7472°E) at 375 metres (1,230 ft) above sea level

The predominant land use is grazing on native vegetation.

== History ==
Yagalingu (also known as Jagalingu, Auanbura, Kokleburra, Owanburra, Kowanburra, Wagalbara, and Djagalingu) is an Australian Aboriginal language of Central Queensland. Its traditional language region was within the local government area of Isaac Region, from the headwaters of the Belyando River south to Avoca, north to Laglan, west to the Great Dividing Range, and east and south to Drummond Range.

On 17 May 2019, it was decided to discontinue the locality of Mistake Creek and absorb its land into the neighbouring localities of Clermont, Laglan, Frankfield and Peak Vale.

== Demographics ==
In the 2016 census, Laglan had "no people or a very low population".

In the 2021 census, Laglan had a population of 21 people.

== Economy ==
There are a number of homesteads in the locality, including:

- Bimbah East (22.3354°S 146.2638°E)
- Doongmabulla (22.0703°S 146.2441°E)
- Laglan (22.4943°S 146.6677°E)
- Lestree Downs (22.6129°S 146.5287°E)
- Lou Lou Park (22.4013°S 146.1411°E)

== Transport ==
Doongmabulla Airstrip is at the Doongmabulla homestead (22.0441°S 146.2826°E).

Laglan Airstrip is at Laglan homestead (22.4901°S 146.6649°E).

== Education ==
There are no schools in Laglan and none nearby. Distance education and boarding schools are options.
