= Frankfield, Queensland =

Frankfield
- Suburb
- Interactive map of Frankfield
- Coordinates: 22.2572°S 147.1180°E
- Country: Australia
- State: Queensland
- LGA: Isaac Region
- Location: 62.0 km (38.5 mi) NW of Kilcummin; 89.4 km (55.6 mi) NNW of Clermont; 175 km (109 mi) W of Moranbah; 354 km (220 mi) SW of Mackay; 1,024 km (636 mi) NNW of Brisbane

Government
  - State electorate: Burdekin
  - Federal division: Capricornia

Area
  - Total: 3,137.9 km^{2} (1,211.5 sq mi)

Population
  - Total: 100 (2021 census)
  - Density: 0.032/km^{2} (0.08/sq mi)
- Time zone: UTC+10:00 (AEST)
- Postcode: 4721
Suburbs around Frankfield
Belyando	Belyando	Pasha
Elgin	Frankfield	Kilcummin
Laglan	Clermont	Clermont

Frankfield is a rural locality in the Isaac Region, Queensland, Australia. In the 2021 census, Frankfield had a population of 100 people.

== Geography ==
The Gregory Developmental Road enters the locality from the north-west (Belyando) and exits to the west (Kilcummun).

Mazeppa National Park is a 4,130-hectare (10,200-acre) protected area in the west of the locality (22.2300°S 147.2922°E). It is mix of gidgee scrub, brigalow scrub and open eucalypt woodland and protects various types of wildlife, including finches, the vulnerable squatter pigeon and koala.

Apart from the national park, the land use is predominantly grazing on native vegetation with some crop growing.

== History ==
Mazeppa National Park was gazetted in 1994 under the Nature Conservation Act 1992.

On 17 May 2019, it was decided to discontinue the locality of Mistake Creek and absorb its land into the neighbouring localities of Clermont, Laglan, Frankfield and Peak Vale.

== Demographics ==
In the 2016 census, Frankfield had a population of 37 people.

In the 2021 census with the boundaries having been enlarged in 2019, Frankfield had a population of 100 people.

== Education ==
There are no schools in Frankfield. Residents in the east of the locality can access Kilcummin State School in neighbouring Kilcummin to the east, but it is too distant for those in other parts of the locality. Similarly, Clermont State High School in Clermont to the south-east is the nearest government secondary school, but most residents of Frankfield would be too far away. The alternatives are distance education and boarding school.
