= Burton coal mine =

Mine in Queensland, Australia

Coordinates: 21.589506°S 148.16602°E

Burton Coal Mine
- Interactive map of Burton Coal Mine
- Location: Burton, Queensland, Australia
- Products: Coking coal
- Opened: 1996
- Company: Peabody Energy

The Burton Coal Mine is a coal mine located in the north of Central Queensland, Australia. The mine has coal reserves amounting to 164 million tonnes of coking coal, one of the largest coal reserves in the world. The mine has an annual production capacity of 4.3 million tonnes of coal. Mining operations began 1996.

Operations at the mine were carried out by Thiess until December 2017 when a joint venture between Peabody Energy (10%) and New Hope Coal (90%) took over. The mine employs about 900 people. Extraction is undertaken by a terrace mining truck and shovel operation. Exports from the mine are sent to Asia, Europe, India and South America.

The coking coal produced at Burton has the lowest sulphur content for any Australian hard coking coal.

== Pits ==
The original mining pit was deepened from 30 metres to 110 metres in 1998. It was exhausted in June 2005, followed by Broadmeadow and Wallanbah pits in 2009. Two more pits, Bullock Creek and Plumtree South were utilised from 2010 onwards.

Both the Broadmeadow and Wallanbah pits are being rehabilitated.
