= Lake Elphinstone =

Lake in Queensland, Australia

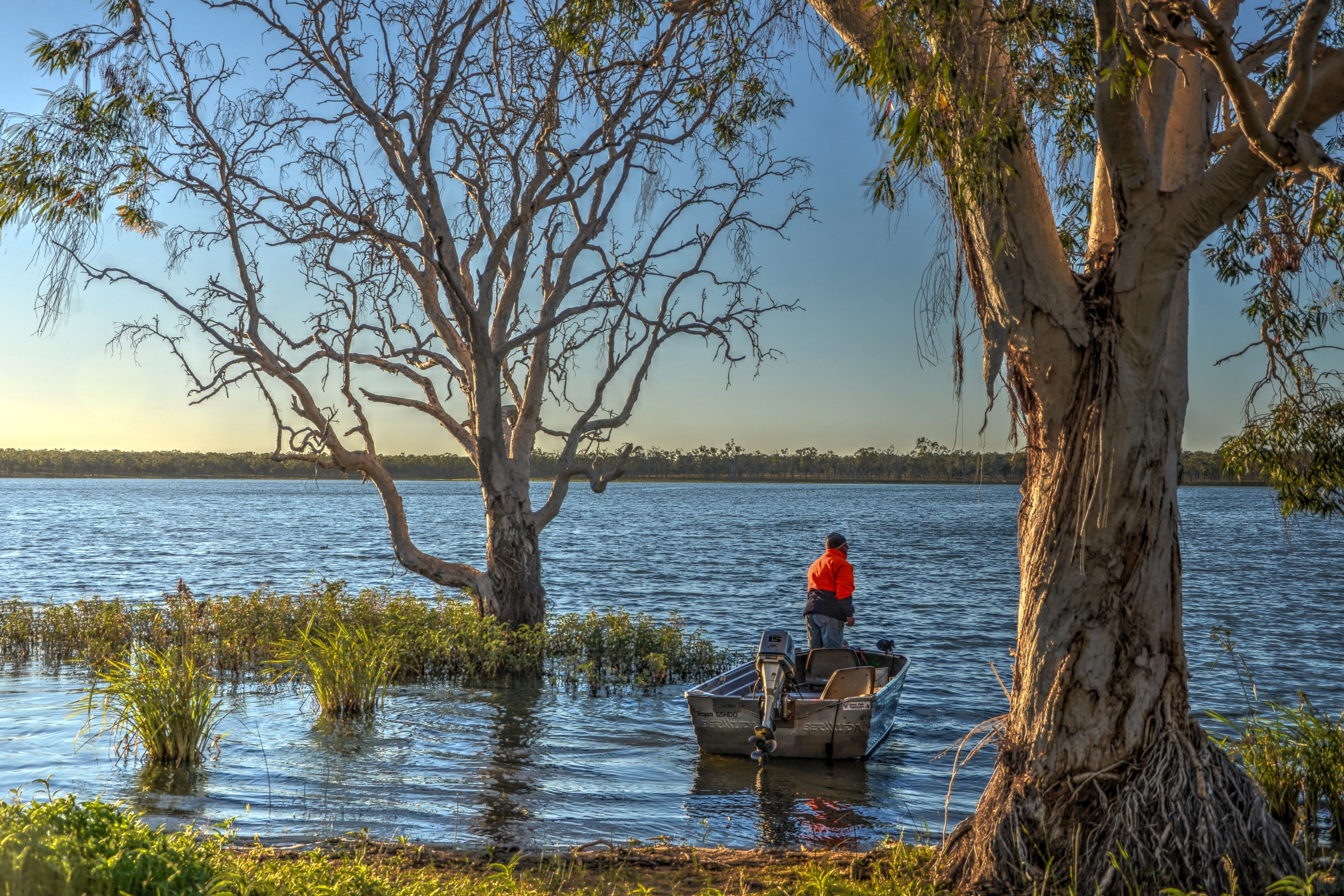
- Lake Elphinstone, 2016

- Location within Queensland
- Location: Queensland
- Coordinates: 21°31′S 148°14′E
- Basin countries: Australia

Lake Elphinstone is a natural lake in Queensland, Australia. It is located about 92 kilometres (57 mi) west of Mackay in Isaac Region (formerly Nebo Shire). The lake used to support the town of Elphinstone, however the town no longer exists, and the lake is a recreation area popular for bird-watching, fishing and camping.

== See also ==
- List of lakes of Australia
