= Suttor, Queensland =

Suttor
- Suburb
- Interactive map of Suttor
- Coordinates: 21.3405°S 147.8966°E
- Country: Australia
- State: Queensland
- LGA: Isaac Region
- Location: 45.4 km (28.2 mi) W of Glenden; 189 km (117 mi) W of Mackay; 223 km (139 mi) N of Moranbah; 1,077 km (669 mi) NNW of Brisbane

Government
  - State electorate: Burdekin
  - Federal division: Capricornia

Area
  - Total: 370.1 km^{2} (142.9 sq mi)

Population
  - Total: 75 (2021 census)
  - Density: 0.2026/km^{2} (0.525/sq mi)
- Time zone: UTC+10:00 (AEST)
- Postcode: 4743
Suburbs around Suttor
Mount Coolon	Newlands	Newlands
Mount Coolon	Suttor	Glenden
Eaglefield	Eaglefield	Glenden

Suttor is a locality in the Isaac Region, Queensland, Australia. In the 2021 census, Suttor had a population of 75 people.

== Geography ==
Suttor River is the western boundary of the locality and Suttor Creek forms part of the southern boundary, their confluence being at the south-westernmost point of the locality. The Suttor Creek coal mine is in the south of the locality. Apart from the mine, the principal land use is cattle grazing.

The Newlands railway system passes through Suttor, providing access to the coal-loading port at Abbot Point.

== History ==
The locality takes its name from the Suttor River, which in turn was named on 7 March 1845 by explorer Ludwig Leichhardt on his expedition from Moreton Bay to Port Essington. Leichhardt named the river after William Henry Suttor, who had given Leichhardt some bullocks for his expedition.

The mining lease for the Suttor Creek coal mine was obtained in 1994 with production commencing in the open-cut mine in February 2004. It is estimated that coal will be mined until 2038.

== Demographics ==
In the 2016 census, Suttor had "no people or a very low population".

In the 2021 census, Suttor had a population of 75 people.

== Education ==
There are no schools in Suttor. The nearest government primary and secondary school is Glenden State School in neighbouring Glenden to the east.
