= Newlands coal mine =

Mine in Queensland, Australia

Newlands Coal Mine
- Location within Queensland
- Location: Newlands, Queensland, Australia; 21°12′44″S 147°53′6″E
- Products: Coking coal
- Opened: 1983
- Company: Glencore

The Newlands Coal Mine is a coal mine located in the north of the Bowen Basin at Newlands about 28 km northwest of Glenden in North Queensland, Australia.

The mine has coal reserves amounting to 413 million tonnes of low ash steaming coal, one of the largest coal reserves in Australia and the world. The mine has an annual production capacity of 10.6 million tonnes of coal.

== History ==
The mine is currently owned by Anglo−Swiss Glencore corporation. Mining operations began in 1983. Originally the mine was operated by the major owner MIM (Mount Isa Mines) as part of the NCA (Newlands Collinsville Abbot Point) project.

Operations at the mine are conducted both underground and in an open-cut pit from a single coal seam, the Upper Newlands seam which has an average thickness of six metres. Underground mining began in 1998. However underground operations ceased in 2015.

== See also ==
- Coal mines in Queensland
- Coal mining in Australia
- List of mines in Australia
