= Winchester, Queensland =

Winchester
- Suburb
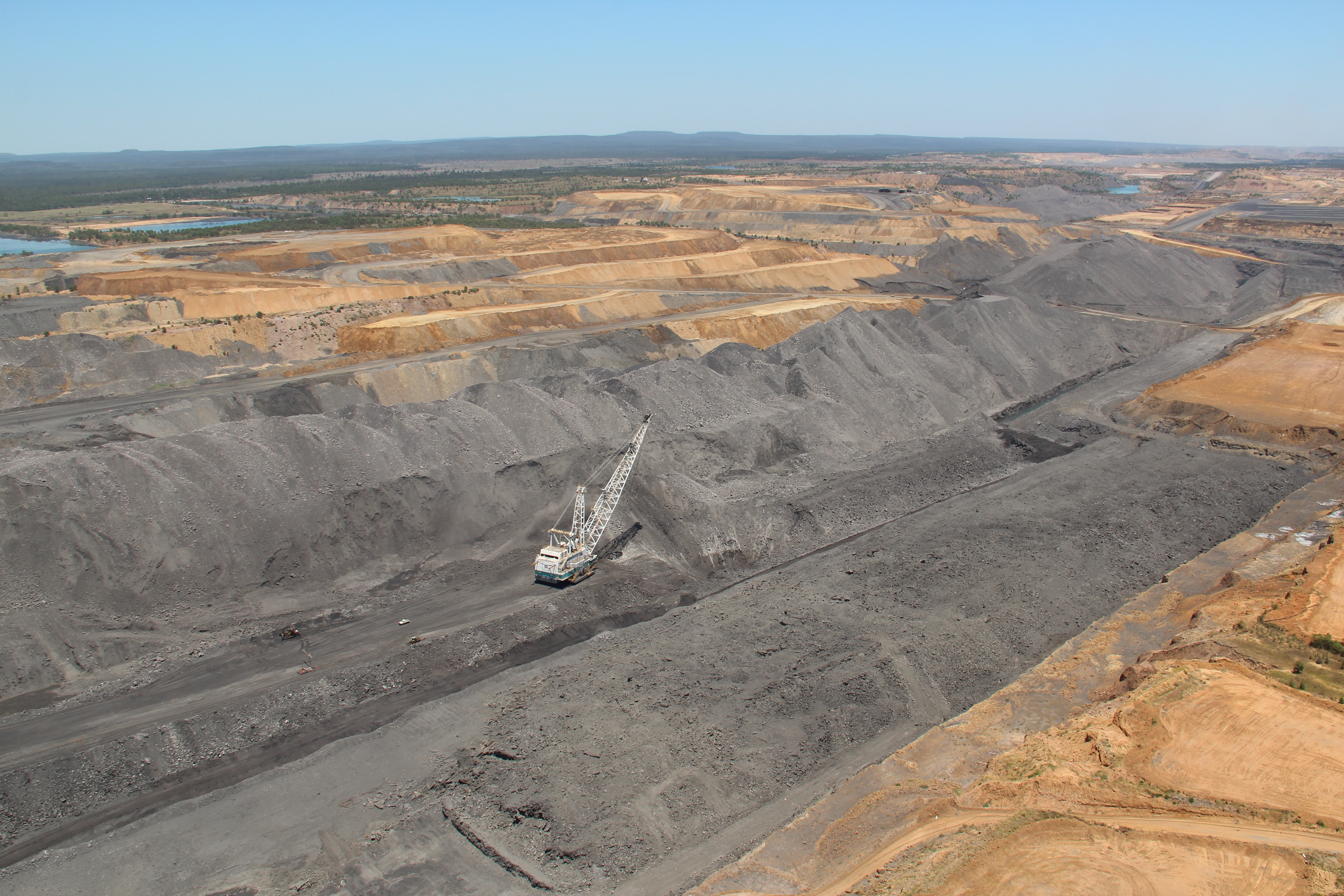
- Peak Downs mine, 2012

- Interactive map of Winchester
- Coordinates: 22.2772°S 148.0447°E
- Country: Australia
- State: Queensland
- LGA: Isaac Region
- Location: 39.3 km (24.4 mi) S of Moranbah; 45.5 km (28.3 mi) N of Dysart; 208 km (129 mi) SW of Mackay; 1,002 km (623 mi) NNW of Brisbane

Government
  - State electorate: Burdekin
  - Federal division: Capricornia

Area
  - Total: 936.1 km^{2} (361.4 sq mi)

Population
  - Total: 0 (2021 census)
  - Density: 0.0000/km^{2} (0.0000/sq mi)
- Time zone: UTC+10:00 (AEST)
- Postcode: 4721
Suburbs around Winchester
| Moranbah | Moranbah | Coppabella |
| Kilcummin | Winchester | Dysart |
| Gemini Mountains | Gemini Mountains | Dysart |

Winchester is a rural locality in the Isaac Region, Queensland, Australia. There are a number of coal mines in Winchester. In the 2021 census, Winchester had "no people or a very low population".

== Geography ==
Winchester sits on a major coal deposit in the Bowen Basin. There are a number of coal mines operating in the north-east of the locality (and beyond into adjacent localities), including Peak Downs Mine, Peak Downs East Mine, Eagle Downs Mine, and Winchester Mine. The Goonyella railway line provides transport from the mines to the ports, with stations:

- Peak Downs Junction railway station (22.2447°S 148.1966°E)
- Peak Downs railway station (22.2535°S 148.1793°E)

Despite its name, Winchester railway station is in neighbouring Dysart.

The terrain ranges from 190 to 510 metres (620 to 1,670 ft) above sea level, with the following named peaks:

- Possum Hill in the north of the locality (22.2202°S 148.0793°E) 330 metres (1,080 ft)
- Mount Rankin in the west of the locality (22.2856°S 147.8352°E) 374 metres (1,227 ft)

In the opencut mining areas, the terrain is artificially lower inside the pits. Apart from the mining areas, the predominant land use is grazing on native vegetation.

== History ==
The locality was officially named and bounded on 16 June 2000.

== Demographics ==
In the 2016 census, Winchester had a population of 5 people.

In the 2021 census, Winchester had "no people or a very low population".

== Education ==
There are no schools in Winchester. The nearest government primary schools are Moranbah State School in neighbouring Moranbah to the north, Dysart State School in neighbouring Dysart to the south-east and Kilcummin State School in neighbouring Kilcummin to the west. The nearest government secondary schools are Moranbah State High School in Moranbah and Dysart State High School in Dysart.

== Facilities ==
Peak Downs Ambulance Station is at the Peak Down Mine (22.2591°S 148.1771°E).
