= Shire of Wangaratta (Queensland) =

Local government area of Queensland, Australia

Coordinates: 20.34°S 147.94°E

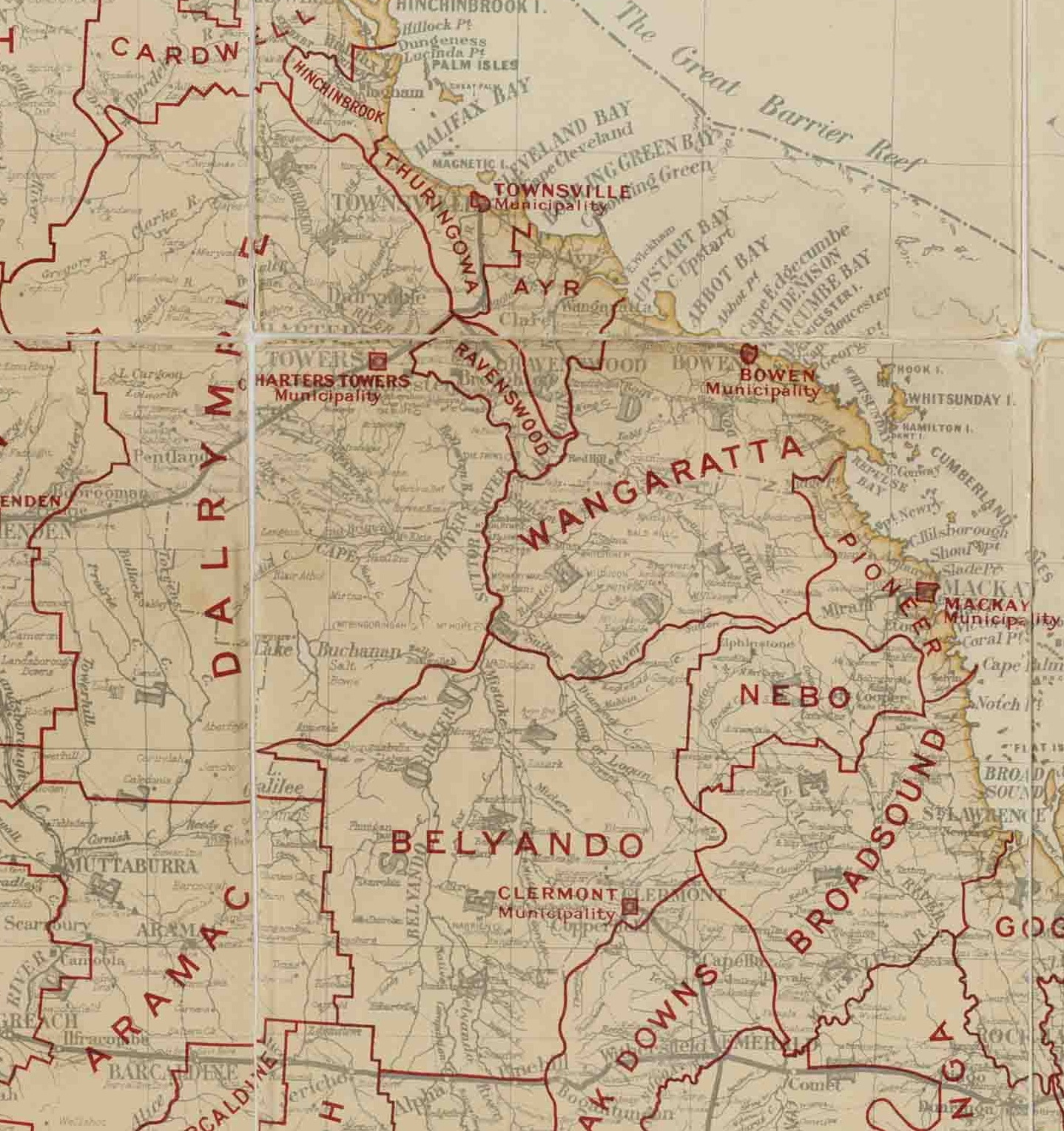
Map of Wangaratta Division and adjacent local government areas, March 1902

The Shire of Wangaratta was a local government area in the North Queensland region of Queensland, Australia.

== History ==
On 11 November 1879, Wangaratta Division was created on 11 November 1879 as one of 74 divisions around Queensland under the Divisional Boards Act 1879 with a population of 789.

With the passage of the Local Authorities Act 1902, Wangaratta Division became the Shire of Wangaratta on 31 March 1903.

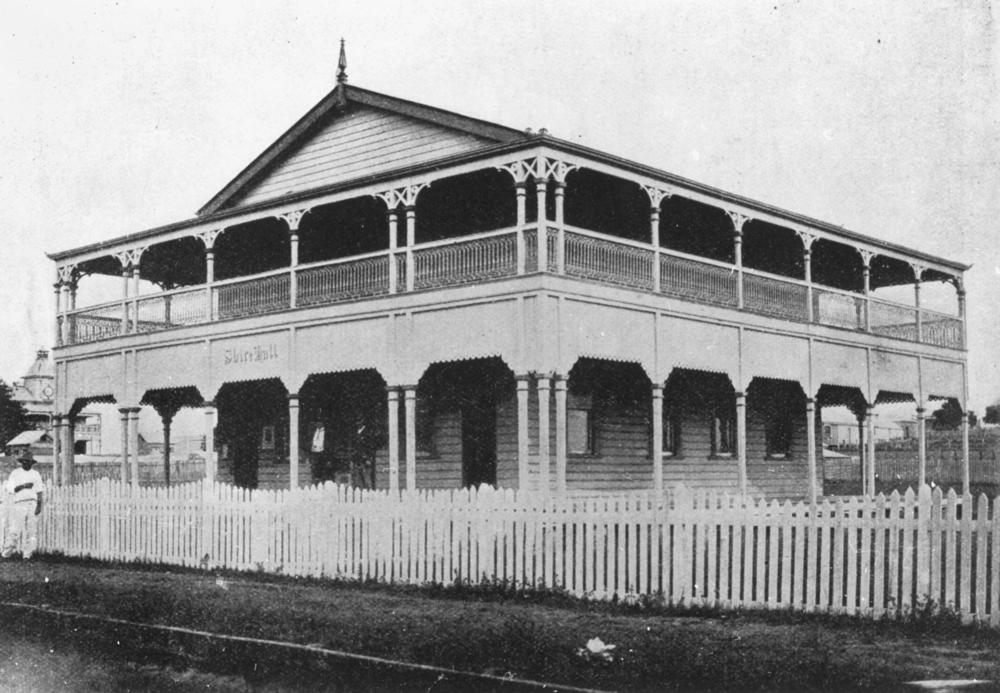
Wangaratta Shire Hall in Bowen, 1906

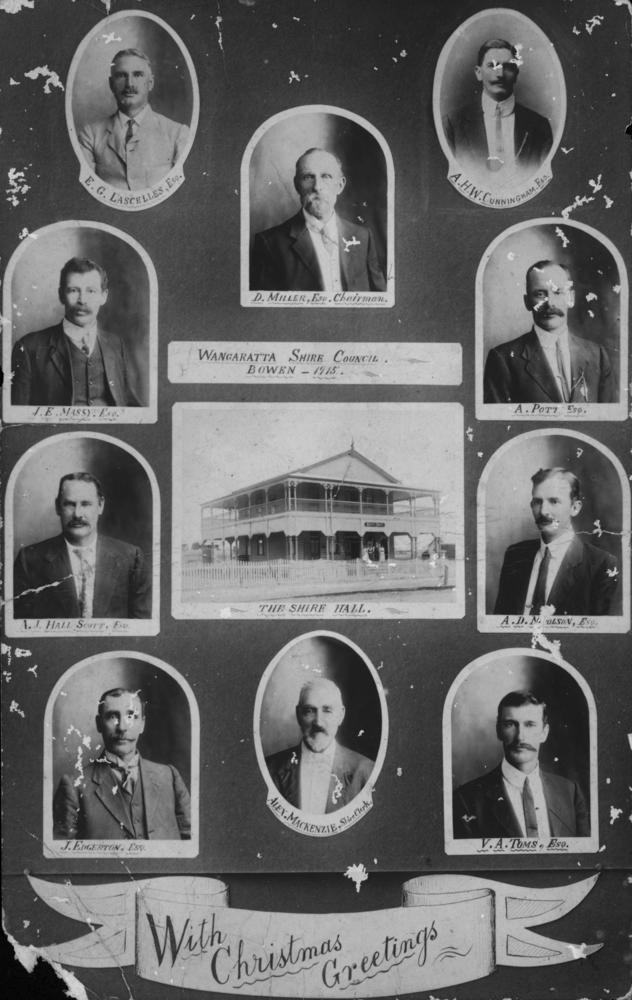
Wangaratta Shire Council members, 1915

On 2 April 1960, the Shire of Wangaratta was amalgamated with the Town of Bowen creating the new Shire of Bowen.

== Chairmen ==
- 1927: Arthur Henry Wickham Cunningham
