= Glenden, Queensland =

Glenden
- Town
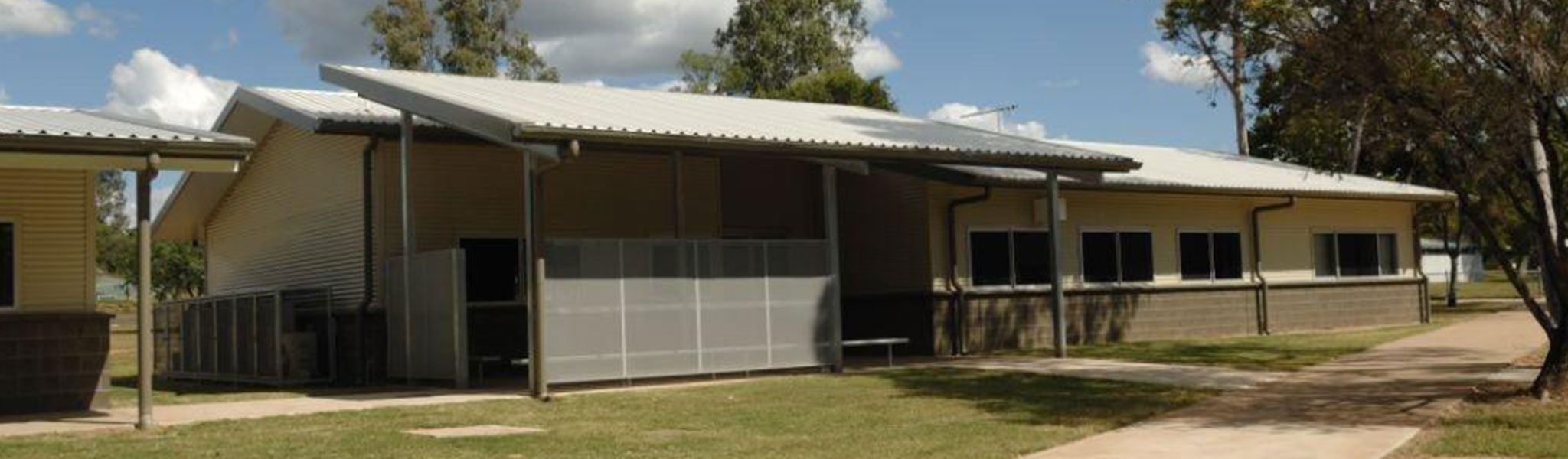
- Glenden State School

- Interactive map of Glenden
- Coordinates: 21.3539°S 148.1147°E
- Country: Australia
- State: Queensland
- LGA: Isaac Region
- Location: 117 km (73 mi) N of Moranbah; 166 km (103 mi) W of Mackay; 1,028 km (639 mi) NNW of Brisbane

Government
  - State electorate: Burdekin
  - Federal division: Capricornia

Area
  - Total: 365.2 km^{2} (141.0 sq mi)

Population
  - Total: 477 (2021 census)
  - Density: 1.3061/km^{2} (3.383/sq mi)
- Time zone: UTC+10:00 (AEST)
- Postcode: 4743
Localities around Glenden
Newlands	Turrawulla	Turrawulla
Suttor	Glenden	Hail Creek
Eaglefield	Burton	Elphinstone

Glenden is a mining town and rural locality in the Isaac Region, Queensland, Australia. In the 2021 census, the locality of Glenden had a population of 477 people.

== History ==
Glenden was constructed by the Mount Isa Mines company (now Glencore) to provide accommodation for workers at their Newlands coal mine. The site, 30 kilometres from the mine, was chosen in 1981 and was constructed by the company and then given to the Shire of Nebo (which was amalgamated in 2008 to become Isaac Region) to administer.

Glenden State School opened on 25 January 1982.

Glenden Post Office opened circa 1983.

Glenden Christian School opened on 5 January 1995 but closed on 3 February 1997.

In 2015, a rodeo arena was built in the town. However, in 2017, the rodeo was cancelled as the local mine changed its roster to a seven-days-on, seven-days-off roster, resulting in 40 families leaving the area.

In 2023, there was outrage when it was announced that the town of Glenden would be demolished as it was a requirement of the original mine approval that a complete rehabilitiation of the area was undertaken when the mine closed. This announcement came at a time of high levels of homelessness in Queensland due to a shortage of homes. On 18 August 2023, the Queensland Premier Annastacia Palaszczuk announced that legislation would be enacted to prevent the demolition of the town.

== Demographics ==
In the 2011 census, the locality of Glenden had a population of 1,308 people.

In the 2016 census, the locality of Glenden had a population of 620 people.

In the 2021 census, the locality of Glenden had a population of 477 people.

== Economy ==
The mine is the major employer in the town. The surrounding rural areas are mostly cattle grazing stations.

== Education ==
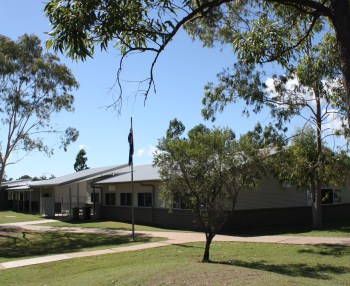
Library and classroom block, Glenden State School, 2025

Glenden State School is a government primary and secondary (Prep–12) school for boys and girls at Gillham Terrace (21.3539°S 148.1158°E). In 2013, the school had 317 students and 25 teachers (24 full-time equivalent). In 2018, the school had an enrolment of 91 students with 15 teachers (14 full-time equivalent) and 12 non-teaching staff (8 full-time equivalent).

== Facilities ==
Glenden Police Station is at 8 Bell Place (21.3586°S 148.1191°E).

Glenden Fire Station is at 2 Bell Place (21.3584°S 148.1190°E).

Glenden Primary Health Care Centre is at 4 Bell Place (21.3582°S 148.1189°E). Glenden Ambulance Station is also located there (21.3579°S 148.1187°E).

Glenden Water Treatment Plant is on Usher the south-west of the town (21.3586°S 148.1086°E). Glenden SES Facility is within the water treatment site on the south-east corner on Usher Street (21.3592°S 148.1100°E).

== Amenities ==
The Isaac Regional Council operates a public library in Glenden Shopping Centre in the Town Centre on Ewan Drive (21.3585°S 148.1164°E). The council also operates the Glenden Recreation Centre in the Town Centre (21.3586°S 148.1155°E). It also provides tennis and basketball courts off Bell Place (21.3564°S 148.1184°E), the Maddern Oval on Gilbert Avenue, and the Glenden Swimming Pool at 21 Bell Place (21.3576°S 148.1178°E).

St Paul's Anglican and Catholic Church is on the western corner of Perry Drive and Bell Place (21.3591°S 148.1185°E).

Glenden Golf Club is an 18-hole golf course at the end of Golf Club Road (21.3502°S 148.1228°E).
