= Shire of Broadsound =

Coordinates: 27°20′57.28″S 149°31′18″E

- Local government area
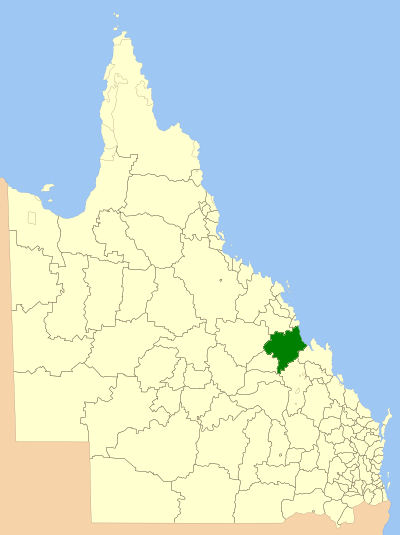
- Location within Queensland

- Country: Australia
- State: Queensland
- Region: Capricornia
- Established: 1879
- Council seat: St Lawrence

Area
  - Total: 18,546.0 km^{2} (7,160.7 sq mi)

Population
  - Total: 6,843 (2006 census)
  - Density: 0.368974/km^{2} (0.95564/sq mi)
LGAs around Shire of Broadsound
Belyando	Nebo	Sarina
Peak Downs	Shire of Broadsound	Pacific Ocean
Emerald	Duaringa	Livingstone

Shire of Broadsound was a local government area in the Capricornia region of Queensland, Australia. The Shire, administered from the town of St Lawrence, covered an area of 18,546.0 square kilometres (7,160.7 sq mi), and existed as a local government entity from 1879 until 2008, when it was amalgamated with the Shires of Belyando and Nebo to form the Isaac Region.

Broadsound official logo

== History ==
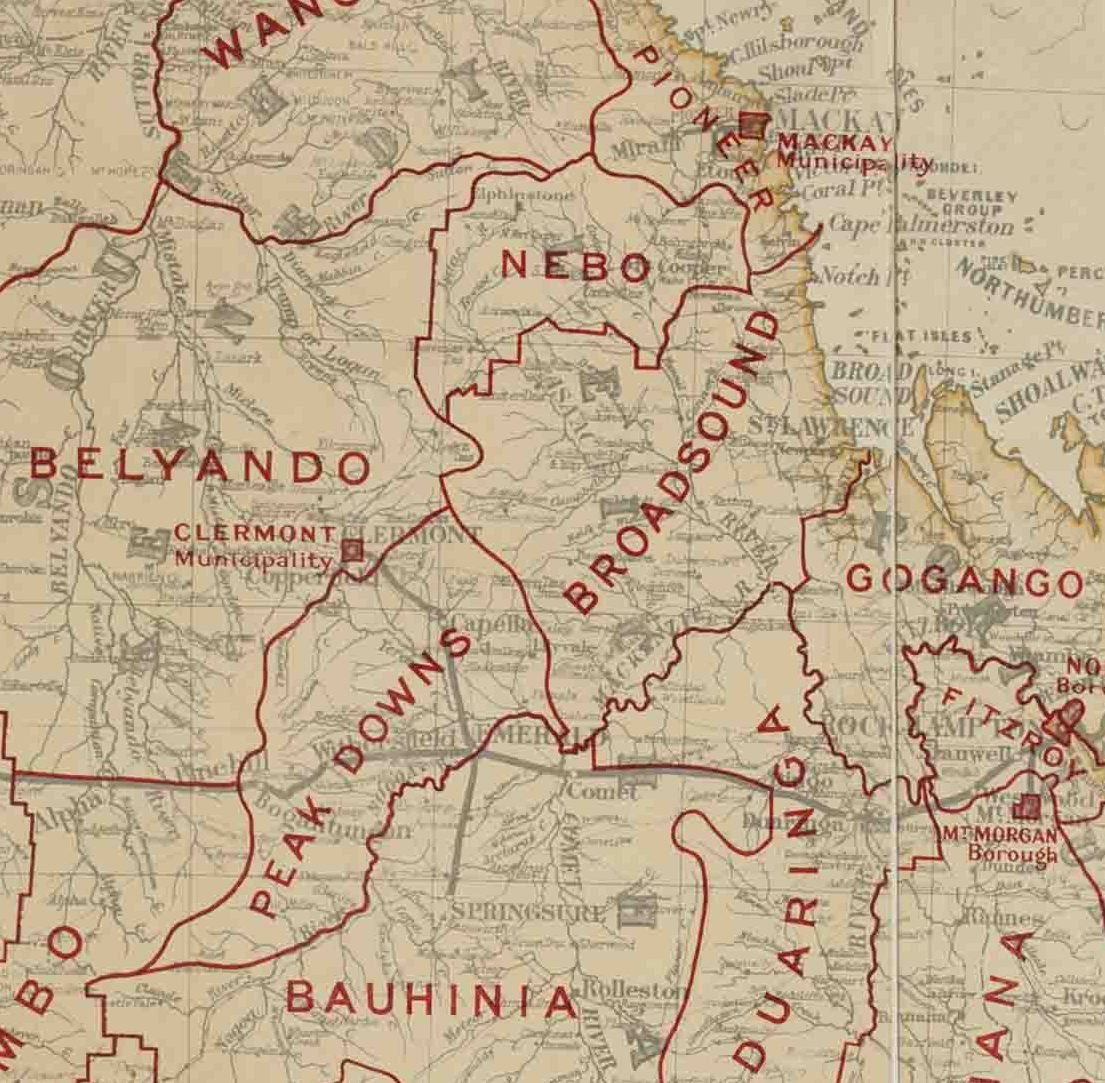
Map of Broadsound Division and adjacent local government areas, March 1902

On 11 November 1879, the Broadsound Division was established as one of 74 divisions around Queensland under the Divisional Boards Act 1879 with a population of 1146.

On 3 March 1892, part of subdivision 2 of the Broadsound Division was transferred to subdivision 3 of the Gogango Division. Another part of subdivision 2 of the Broadsound Division was transferred to the Duaringa Division.

On 7 February 1883, part of subdivisions 2 and 3 of Broadsound Division were separated to create Nebo Division.

With the passage of the Local Authorities Act 1902, Broadsound Division became the Shire of Broadsound on 31 March 1903.

On 15 March 2008, under the Local Government (Reform Implementation) Act 2007 passed by the Parliament of Queensland on 10 August 2007, Broadsound merged with the Shires of Belyando and Nebo to form the Isaac Region.

== Towns and localities ==
The Shire of Broadsound included the following settlements:

- St Lawrence
- Carmila
- Clairview
- Clarke Creek
- Dysart
- Flaggy Rock
- Greenhill
- Ilbilbie
- Middlemount
- Valkyrie

== Population ==
Year	Population
1933	1,590
1947	1,415
1954	1,537
1961	1,539
1966	1,625
1971	1,589
1976	3,379
1981	6,908
1986	8,419
1991	8,472
1996	7,486
2001	6,601
2006	6,843

== Chairmen ==
- 1907: J.C. Hutton
- 1909: Ramsden Gledstanes Talbot
- 1915: Ramsden Gledstanes Talbot
- 1927: James Gillespie
- 1979–1982: Jim Randell
