= Homevale National Park =

National park in Queensland, Australia

- IUCN category II (national park)
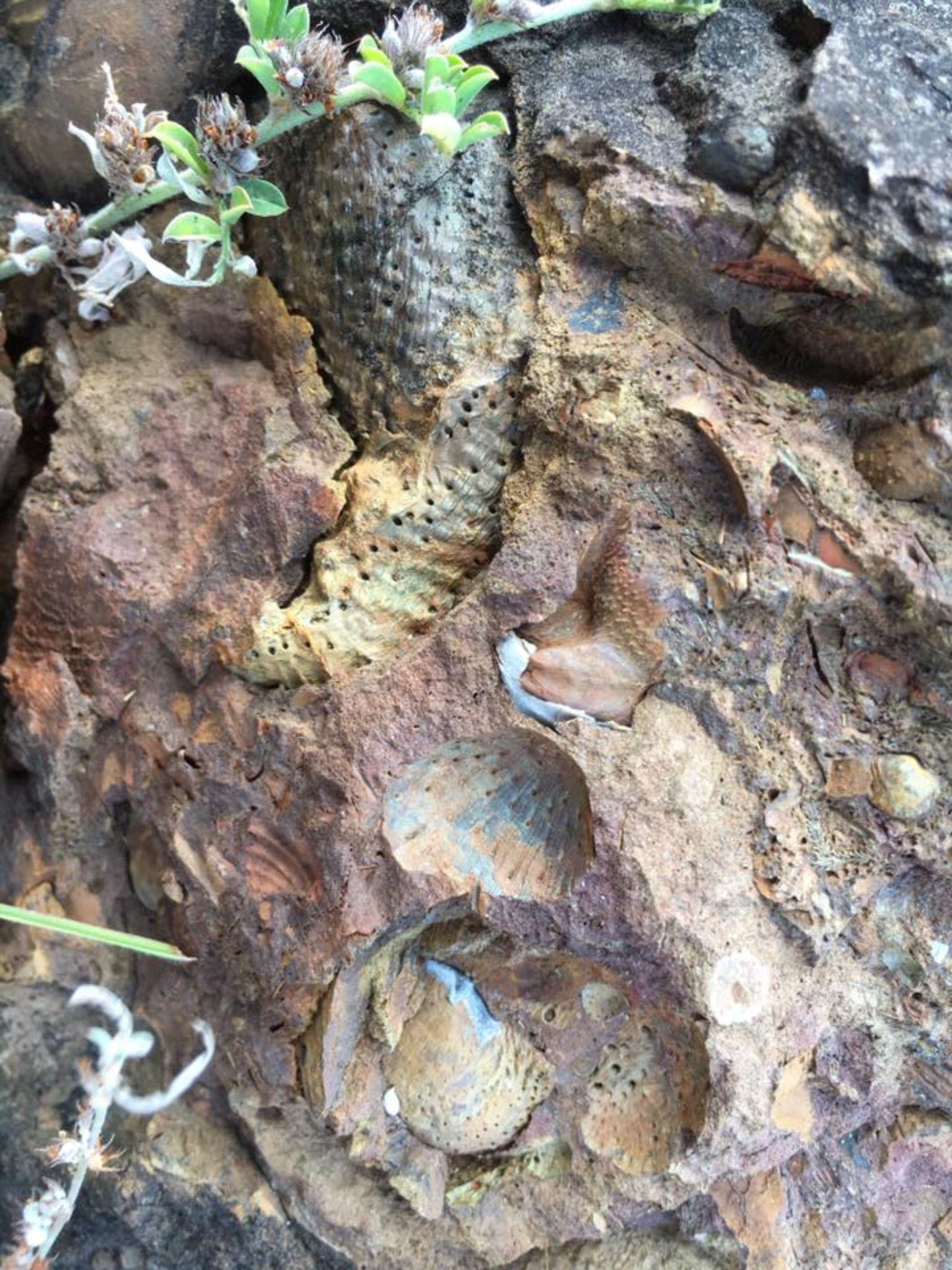
- Fossilised sea shells, 2016

- Location within Queensland
- Location: Queensland
- Coordinates: 21.4358°S 148.5213°E
- Area: 218 km^{2} (84 sq mi)
- Established: 1995
- Governing body: Queensland Parks and Wildlife Service

Homevale National Park is a protected area in the Isaac Region in Central Queensland, Australia, 821 km northwest of Brisbane. The landscape is dominated by cliffs, peaks and spires. Fossils dating from the Permian period (280–225 million years) have been found here.

== Geography ==
The average elevation of the terrain is 436 metres.

== History ==
Homevale National Park was previously the Homevale pastoral station where cattle were grazed.

Homevale National Park was gazetted in 1995 under the Nature Conservation Act 1992 by regulation, Nature Conservation (Protected Areas) Amendment (No.5) 1995. Its area was changed in 1996, 2009, and 2024.

As at 2024, the homestead of the Homevale pastoral station remains within the national park on Homevale Homestead Road (21.4399°S 148.5259°E) and conservation plans are to be developed for it.

== See also ==
- Protected areas of Queensland
