= Elphinstone, Queensland (Isaac Region) =

Elphinstone
- Suburb
- Interactive map of Elphinstone
- Coordinates: 21.4797°S 148.1849°E
- Country: Australia
- State: Queensland
- LGA: Isaac Region
- Location: 25.7 km (16.0 mi) SSE of Glenden; 142 km (88 mi) WSW of Mackay; 159 km (99 mi) NW of Moranbah; 1,023 km (636 mi) NNW of Brisbane

Government
  - State electorate: Burdekin
  - Federal division: Capricornia

Area
  - Total: 208.8 km^{2} (80.6 sq mi)

Population
  - Total: 9 (2021 census)
  - Density: 0.0431/km^{2} (0.112/sq mi)
- Time zone: UTC+10:00 (AEST)
- Postcode: 4742
Suburbs around Elphinstone
Glenden	Glenden	Hail Creek
Burton	Elphinstone	Kemmis
Burton	Burton	Kemmis

Elphinstone is a rural locality in the Isaac Region, Queensland, Australia. In the 2021 census, Elphinstone had a population of 9 people.

== Geography ==
The Suttor Developmental Road enters the locality from the east (Kemmis) and exits to the west (Burton).

Isaac River rises in the north of the locality and flows south-west, exiting to the west (Burton). Anna Creek rises in he centre of the locality and flows south into Lake Elphinstone (21.5317°S 148.2344°E), which supplied the water for the now-abandoned town of Elphinstone (21.5137°S 148.2457°E).

Elphinstone has the following mountains and valleys (from north to south):

- Mount Ewan in the north of the locality (21.4435°S 148.1730°E), rising to 468 metres (1,535 ft) above sea level
- Plum Duff in the north of the locality (21.4619°S 148.1964°E), 365 metres (1,198 ft)
- Leichhardt Gorge in the north-west of the locality (21.4945°S 148.1706°E)

The land use is grazing on native vegetation.

== History ==
The locality was named after explorer George Elphinstone Dalrymple, the leader of the 1859 and 1860 overland settlement expeditions to Port Denison from Rockhampton.

In 1859, Philip Sellheim reported finding Lake Elphinstone, which he called Lake Emilia after his sister. It was also called Lake Barton by W.H. Gaden, but it was ultimately named Lake Elphinstone after the explorer.

== Demographics ==
In the 2016 census, Elphinstone had a population of 6 people.

In the 2021 census, Elphinstone had a population of 9 people.

== Education ==
There are no schools in Elphinstone. The nearest government primary and secondary school is Glenden State School (Prep–12) in neighbouring Glenden to the north.
