= Kilcummin, Queensland =

Kilcummin
- Suburb
- Interactive map of Kilcummin
- Coordinates: 22.3411°S 147.5869°E
- Country: Australia
- State: Queensland
- LGA: Isaac Region
- Location: 63.0 km (39.1 mi) N of Clermont; 110 km (68 mi) SW of Moranbah; 287 km (178 mi) SW of Mackay; 436 km (271 mi) NW of Rockhampton; 997 km (620 mi) NNW of Brisbane

Government
  - State electorate: Burdekin
  - Federal division: Capricornia

Area
  - Total: 2,235.0 km^{2} (862.9 sq mi)

Population
  - Total: 228 (2021 census)
  - Density: 0.10201/km^{2} (0.2642/sq mi)
- Time zone: UTC+10:00 (AEST)
- Postcode: 4721
Suburbs around Kilcummin
Frankfield	Pasha	Moranbah
Frankfield	Kilcummin	Winchester
Clermont	Wolfang	Gemini Mountains

Kilcummin is a rural locality in the Isaac Region, Queensland, Australia. In the 2021 census, Kilcummin had a population of 228 people.

== Geography ==
The Gregory Developmental Road passes through the locality from the south to the south-west.

The Blair Athol branch line of the Central Western Railway passes through the locality from east to south-west with Blackridge railway station in the south-east of the locality (22.5536°S 147.6586°E).

== History ==
Kilcummin State School opened on 2 February 1959.

== Demographics ==
In the 2016 census, Kilcummin had a population of 260 people.

In the 2021 census, Kilcummin had a population of 228 people.

== Education ==
Kilcummin State School is a government primary (Prep-6) school for boys and girls at 190 East West Road (22.4079°S 147.5469°E). In 2016, the school had an enrolment of 30 students with 4 teachers (2 full-time equivalent) with 6 non-teaching staff (3 full-time equivalent). In 2018, the school had an enrolment of 33 students with 3 teachers (2 full-time equivalent) and 7 non-teaching staff (3 full-time equivalent).

There are no secondary schools in Kilcummin. The nearest government secondary school is Clermont State High School in neighbouring Clermont to the south. However, it would be too distant for students in most of Kilcummin to attend; the alternatives are distance education and boarding school.
