= Coppabella, Queensland =

Coppabella
- Suburb
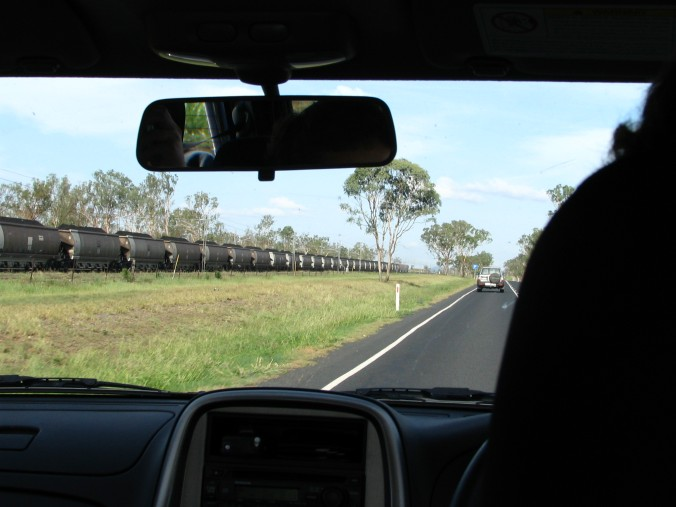
- Coal Train next to Peak Downs Highway, Coppabella, 2004

- Interactive map of Coppabella
- Coordinates: 21.9408°S 148.2744°E
- Country: Australia
- State: Queensland
- LGA: Isaac Region
- Location: 48 km (30 mi) ENE of Moranbah; 145 km (90 mi) SW of Mackay; 234 km (145 mi) N of Emerald; 1,005 km (624 mi) NNW of Brisbane

Government
  - State electorate: Burdekin
  - Federal division: Capricornia

Area
  - Total: 797.1 km^{2} (307.8 sq mi)

Population
  - Total: 594 (2021 census)
  - Density: 0.7452/km^{2} (1.9301/sq mi)
- Time zone: UTC+10:00 (AEST)
- Postcode: 4741
Suburbs around Coppabella
Burton	Kemmis	Strathfield
Moranbah	Coppabella	Oxford
Winchester	Dysart	Valkyrie

Coppabella is a rural locality in the Isaac Region, Queensland, Australia. It was established by Queensland Railways to accommodate train crew and railway maintenance staff. In the 2021 census, Coppabella had a population of 594 people.

== Geography ==
Coppabella is in the Bowen basin mining area. The Peak Downs Highway passes through the locality from north-east to south-west. The Goonyella railway line also passes through the area, with branch lines to service the mines. Two active mines in the area are the Millenium coal mine and Moorvale coal mine, both owned and operated by Peabody Energy.

== History ==
The locality takes its name from the local railway station, which in turn was named by Queensland Railways Department in September 1971, reportedly using an Aboriginal word meaning a crossing place.

Coppabella State School opened on 29 January 1980.

== Demographics ==
In the 2016 census, Coppabella had a population of 466 people.

In the 2021 census, Coppabella had a population of 594 people.

== Education ==
Coppabella State School is a government co-educational primary school (P–6) in Mathieson Street. In 2016, the school had an enrolment of 14 students with 2 teachers and 4 non-teaching staff (2 equivalent full-time). In 2017, the school had an enrolment of 17 students with 2 teachers and 4 non-teaching staff (2 full-time equivalent).

There are no secondary schools in Coppabella; the nearest is Moranbah State High School in neighbouring Moranbah.
