= Newlands, Queensland =

Newlands
- Suburb
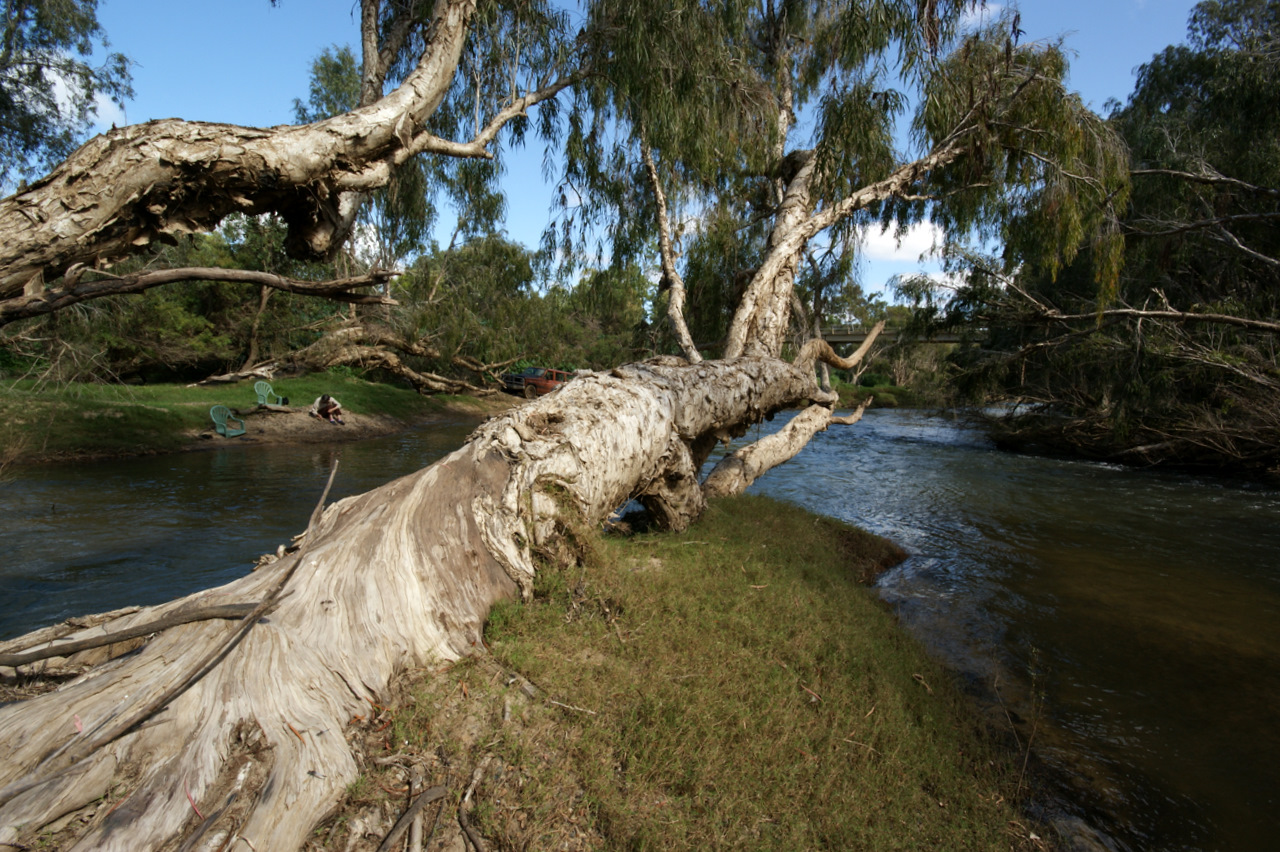
- Bowen River at Newlands, 2009

- Interactive map of Newlands
- Coordinates: 20.9222°S 147.8522°E
- Country: Australia
- State: Queensland
- LGA: Whitsunday Region
- Location: 46.5 km (28.9 mi) S of Collinsville; 73.3 km (45.5 mi) NW of Glenden; 195 km (121 mi) SW of Proserpine; 242 km (150 mi) W of Mackay; 1,111 km (690 mi) NNW of Brisbane

Government
  - State electorate: Burdekin
  - Federal division: Capricornia

Area
  - Total: 2,938.1 km^{2} (1,134.4 sq mi)

Population
  - Total: 99 (2021 census)
  - Density: 0.03370/km^{2} (0.0873/sq mi)
- Time zone: UTC+10:00 (AEST)
- Postcode: 4804
Suburbs around Newlands
Mount Wyatt	Springlands	Bogie
Mount Coolon	Newlands	Eungella Hinterland
Suttor	Glenden	Turrawulla

Newlands is a rural locality in the Whitsunday Region, Queensland, Australia. In the 2021 census, Newlands had a population of 99 people.

== Geography ==
Starvation Creek enters from Eungella Hinterland to the east, and flows north-west to become the Bowen River. A branch of the creek forms part of the north-eastern boundary, and the river forms much of the northern boundary. The Newlands coal mine is in the south of the locality.

The Bowen Developmental Road (State Route 77) runs through from north to south-west.

== Demographics ==
In the 2016 census, Newlands had a population of 66 people.

In the 2021 census, Newlands had a population of 99 people.

== Education ==
There are no schools in Newlands. The nearest government primary schools are:

- Scottville State School in Scottville to the north
- Collinsville State School in Collinsville to the north
- Eungella State School in Eungella to the south-east
- Glenden State School in neighbouring Glenden to the south

The nearest government secondary schools are:

- Collinsville State High School (to Year 12) in Collinsville to the north
- Glenden State School (to Year 12) in neighbouring Glenden to the south

However, some students living near the centre of the locality would be too distant from these primary and/or secondary schools for a daily commute; the alternatives are distance education and boarding school.
