= Moranbah =

- Town
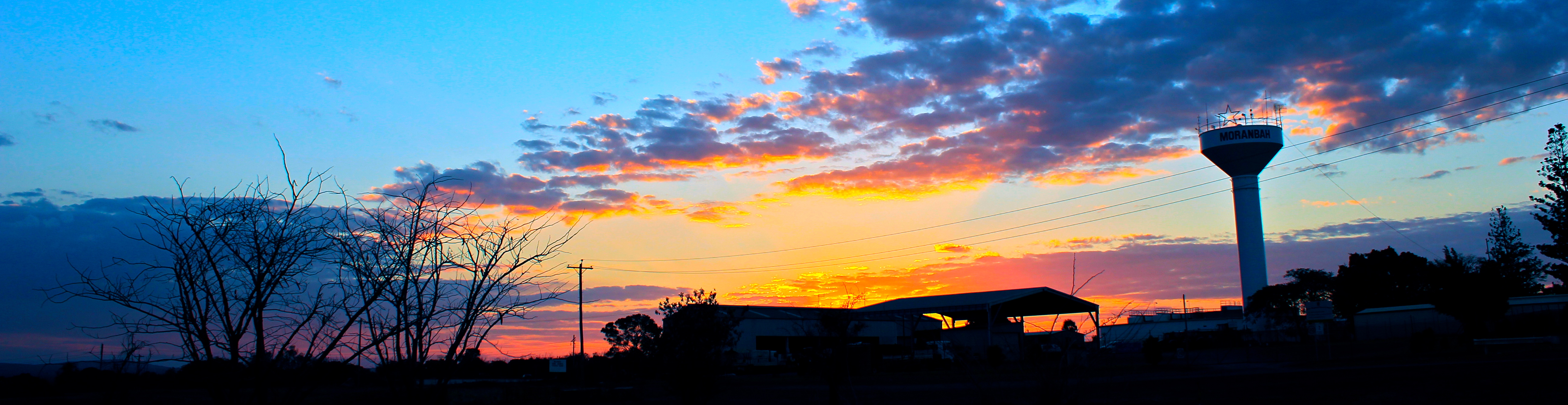
- Moranbah Water Tower at sunset, 2011

- Interactive map of Moranbah
- Coordinates: 22.0016°S 148.0533°E
- Country: Australia
- State: Queensland
- LGA: Isaac Region
- Location: 195 km (121 mi) SW of Mackay; 223 km (139 mi) N of Emerald; 407 km (253 mi) NW of Rockhampton; 1,047 km (651 mi) NNW of Brisbane
- Established: 1969

Government
  - Mayor: Kelly Vea Vea
  - State electorate: Burdekin
  - Federal division: Capricornia

Area
  - Total: 3,038.9 km^{2} (1,173.3 sq mi)
- Elevation: 249 m (817 ft)

Population
  - Total: 9,425 (2021 census)
  - Density: 3.10145/km^{2} (8.0327/sq mi)
- Time zone: UTC+10:00 (AEST)
- Postcode: 4744
- Mean max temp: 29.7 °C (85.5 °F)
- Mean min temp: 16.7 °C (62.1 °F)
- Annual rainfall: 614.2 mm (24.18 in)
Localities around Moranbah
Pasha	Eaglefield	Burton
Pasha	Moranbah	Coppabella
Kilcummin	Kilcummin	Winchester

Moranbah is a coal mining town and locality in the Isaac Region, Queensland, Australia. In the 2021 census, the locality of Moranbah had a population of 9,425.

In addition to the permanent population, Moranbah also has a large fly-in fly-out population working in Moranbah's mines: in excess of 1,500 as at 2011.

== Geography ==
The Peak Downs Highway between Mackay and Clermont passes through the south of the locality; the town is 11.9 kilometres (7.4 mi) north of the highway via the Moranbah Access Road.

Moranbah Airport is also on the Moranbah Access Road, 7.3 kilometres (4.5 mi) by road of the town (22.0602°S 148.0752°E).

=== Climate ===
Moranbah experiences a subtropical semi-arid climate (Köppen: BSh) with hot, relatively wet summers and very mild, dry winters with cool nights.

Climate data for Moranbah (21º59'24"S, 148º01'48"E, 260 m AMSL) (1986–2012 normals and extremes, rainfall to 1972–2012)
Month	Jan	Feb	Mar	Apr	May	Jun	Jul	Aug	Sep	Oct	Nov	Dec	Year
Record high °C (°F)	45.0 (113.0)	41.1 (106.0)	40.4 (104.7)	36.0 (96.8)	33.9 (93.0)	31.9 (89.4)	31.0 (87.8)	36.4 (97.5)	38.0 (100.4)	40.5 (104.9)	42.7 (108.9)	42.5 (108.5)	45.0 (113.0)
Mean daily maximum °C (°F)	33.9 (93.0)	33.1 (91.6)	32.2 (90.0)	29.6 (85.3)	26.5 (79.7)	23.7 (74.7)	23.6 (74.5)	25.5 (77.9)	29.3 (84.7)	32.3 (90.1)	33.1 (91.6)	33.9 (93.0)	29.7 (85.5)
Mean daily minimum °C (°F)	21.9 (71.4)	21.8 (71.2)	20.2 (68.4)	17.6 (63.7)	14.2 (57.6)	11.1 (52.0)	9.8 (49.6)	11.1 (52.0)	14.1 (57.4)	17.6 (63.7)	19.4 (66.9)	21.1 (70.0)	16.7 (62.0)
Record low °C (°F)	14.9 (58.8)	15.5 (59.9)	14.3 (57.7)	6.0 (42.8)	5.0 (41.0)	1.1 (34.0)	0.2 (32.4)	3.0 (37.4)	5.4 (41.7)	10.8 (51.4)	11.9 (53.4)	15.0 (59.0)	0.2 (32.4)
Average precipitation mm (inches)	103.8 (4.09)	100.7 (3.96)	55.4 (2.18)	36.4 (1.43)	34.5 (1.36)	22.1 (0.87)	18.0 (0.71)	25.0 (0.98)	9.1 (0.36)	35.7 (1.41)	69.3 (2.73)	103.9 (4.09)	613.0 (24.13)
Average precipitation days (≥ 1.0 mm)	6.5	6.4	3.9	3.1	2.6	2.1	1.8	1.7	1.4	3.1	4.9	5.9	43.4
Average afternoon relative humidity (%)	43	48	41	43	43	44	39	35	30	31	34	38	39
Average dew point °C (°F)	17.3 (63.1)	18.2 (64.8)	15.7 (60.3)	13.8 (56.8)	11.2 (52.2)	8.8 (47.8)	7.0 (44.6)	6.7 (44.1)	7.6 (45.7)	10.5 (50.9)	12.7 (54.9)	15.4 (59.7)	12.1 (53.7)
Source: Bureau of Meteorology (1986–2012 normals and extremes, rainfall to 1972–2012)

== History ==
=== First Nations ===
The region around the Isaac River and Moranbah is the traditional land of Baranha people of Indigenous Australians.

=== Arrival of explorers ===
In January 1845, the expedition led by Ludwig Leichhardt became the first Europeans to enter the region. Upon approaching the Isaac River, the party encountered a group of Baranha women digging for yams and chopping out a honey-bee nest from a tree. After seeing Leichhardt, they "started with swinging their sticks, and beating the trees, as if we were wild beasts, which they wished to frighten away". Then, "a great number of natives, men, boys, and children, who had been attracted by the screams of their companions, now came running towards us; but on our putting our horses into a sharp canter, and riding towards them, they retired into the scrub".

=== British colonisation ===
The northward advance of British colonists and squatters looking to take more land came to the Isaac River area in 1860. Graziers Andrew Scott and William Fraser inspected the region and laid claim to several leaseholds in 1861, which they named "Morandah", "Goonyella", "Skull Creek" and "Grosvenor Downs".

Scott and Fraser initially found the region "infested with blacks", but both had a formidable history of punitive expeditions against Aboriginal people, being highly involved in the reprisals after the Hornet Bank massacre. Fraser in particular "never lost the opportunity of shooting a wild blackfellow". Scott sold out relatively early but Fraser stayed and consolidated the properties into "Grosvenor Downs" during the 1860s.

Fraser sold Grosvenor Downs in 1867 and joined a local detachment of the Native Police, a paramilitary force assigned to disperse and liquidate Aboriginal communities. In December 1868 about sixty Baranha were massacred at Grosvenor Downs by this force, possibly led by Fraser. Survivors of the violence fled and found some protection at George Bridgman's Fort Cooper sheep station.

Grosvenor Downs developed into a well known horse-breeding and cattle station, with the favourite horse of King George V being raised there. By 1953 the property was worth £56,600.

=== Coal mining community ===
In 1968, Queensland Premier Joh Bjelke-Peterson announced that 175 square miles of Goonyella and Grosvenor Downs land was to be leased for 43 years to the Utah Development Company for $1 per acre in order to mine coal.

The coal mining town of Moranbah was established in 1969. The town was rapidly expanded in the late 1970s by the Utah Development Company to house mine workers. It has been featured twice (once in 1977 and again in 2012) on Four Corners, an investigative news program, exploring the effects of Australia's various mining booms on local rural communities.

Moranbah State School opened on 1 January 1971 with a secondary department, which became Moranbah State High School on 25 January 1976. Moranbah East State School opened on 27 January 1981.

Moranbah Post Office opened on 1 March 1971.

In 2011, the Queensland Government's Office of Economic and Statistical Research reported Moranbah as the most expensive place to live in the state of Queensland. The study compared the cost of goods and services such as rent, electricity and household fuels in regional areas, to those in Brisbane and found Moranbah in first place with a housing index at 65 per cent higher than that of Brisbane. Since then, housing prices and accommodation rentals have returned to much more affordable levels. For example, the median house price in Moranbah between September 2023 and August 2024 was $350,000.

In 2021, the town celebrated its 50th anniversary with four days of jubilee celebrations, held across the Labour Day long weekend from 30 April 2021 to 3 May 2021. The event had been earlier postponed due to the COVID-19 pandemic.

== Demographics ==
In the 2011 census, the locality of Moranbah had a population of 8,965.

In the 2016 census, the locality of Moranbah had a population of 8,735.

In the 2021 census, the locality of Moranbah had a population of 9,425.

== Economy ==
Moranbah services the Peak Downs Mine, Goonyella Riverside Mine, Broadmeadow Mine, Grosvenor Mine, Olive Downs mine, Moranbah North coal mine, North Goonyella coal mine and several other smaller mines in the region. Although one of the newest towns in the region, its central location and large population has made it the seat of the Isaac Regional Council.

== Education ==
Moranbah State School is a government primary (Early Childhood to Year 6) school for boys and girls at Belyando Avenue (21.9984°S 148.0478°E). In 2018, the school had an enrolment of 567 students with 42 teachers (37 full-time equivalent) and 31 non-teaching staff (19 full-time equivalent). It includes a special education program.

Moranbah East State School is a government primary (Prep–6) school for boys and girls at 4 Williams Street (22.0051°S 148.0633°E). In 2018, the school had an enrolment of 605 students with 35 teachers (34 full-time equivalent) and 30 non-teaching staff (18 full-time equivalent).

Moranbah State High School is a government secondary (7–12) school for boys and girls at Mills Avenue (22.0004°S 148.0594°E). In 2018, the school had an enrolment of 654 students with 56 teachers (55 full-time equivalent) and 30 non-teaching staff (23 full-time equivalent). It includes a special education program.

== Amenities ==
For a small regional town it offers a diverse range of sports and entertainment facilities including a skate park, library, public swimming pool, soccer, rugby league, golf course, AFL, hockey, tennis, off-road racing, motocross and a BMX club.

Isaac Regional Council operates a public library located at Grosvenor Complex, Batchelor Parade, Town Square.

The Moranbah branch of the Queensland Country Women's Association meets at the QCWA Meeting Room at Town Square.

Churches in the town include:

- Assembly of God ("Oasis Life")
- Uniting Church
- Catholic Church
- Anglican Church
- Christian Fellowship Church

== Sport ==
Sporting facilities in the town include:

- Rugby Union – Moranbah Bulls who compete in the Mackay Rugby Union competition.
- Australian rules football – Moranbah Bulldogs. Established in 1976, the Senior Club boasts 5 Premierships. In 1977, 1978 and 2014 in the Mackay AFL, and in 1985 and 1986 in the now defunct Central Highlands AFL. The Bulldogs currently participate in the AFL Mackay competition in a 7 club competition and are the most recent Premiers.
- Rugby league – the club competes as the Moranbah Miners in the Mackay & District Rugby League competition, fielding teams in three adult grades as well as a number of junior teams in the Mackay Junior League competition. Previously the club competed as the Sharks in the Central Highlands competition against teams from Dysart, Blackwater, Middlemount, Tieri, Emerald, Clermont and Bluff.
- Soccer – Moranbah Hawks
- Netball
- Indoor Volleyball
- Squash
- Cricket (during summer season)
- Social water polo
- Touch Football league
- Gymnastics
- Gun Club
- BMX
- Athletics Club
- Golf
- Crossfit

== Notable residents ==
The following people were born in, or have lived in, Moranbah:

- Clint Boge – musician
- Josh Hannay (born 1980) – professional rugby league player; born in Moranbah
- Kaylee Kimber (born 2003) – Australian rules footballer
- Shane Marteene (born 1977) – professional rugby league player; born in Moranbah
- Larrissa Miller (born 1992) – gymnast, Australian Olympian in 2012 and 2016; born in Moranbah
- Travis Norton (born 1976) – professional rugby league player
- Desley Robinson (born 1988) – professional boxer; lived in Moranbah
- Clinton Schifcofske (born 1975) – professional rugby league and rugby union player; born in Moranbah
- Dennis Scott (born 1976) – professional rugby league player; born in Moranbah
