= Isaac Region =

Coordinates: 22°49′00″S 148°41′56″E

- Local government area
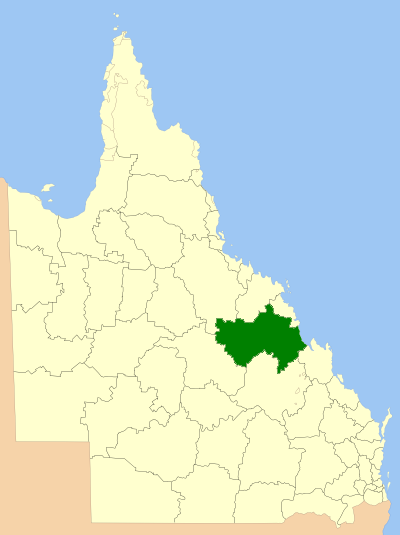
- Location within Queensland

- Interactive map of Isaac Region
- Country: Australia
- State: Queensland
- Established: 2008
- Council seat: Moranbah

Government
  - Mayor: Kelly Maree Vea Vea
  - State electorates: Mirani; Burdekin; Gregory
  - Federal division: Capricornia

Area
  - Total: 58,708 km^{2} (22,667 sq mi)

Population
  - Total: 22,046 (2021 census)
  - Density: 0.375520/km^{2} (0.972591/sq mi)
- Website: Isaac Region
LGAs around Isaac Region
Charters Towers	Whitsunday	Mackay
Barcaldine	Isaac Region	Coral Sea
Barcaldine	Central Highlands	Livingstone

The Isaac Region is a local government area located in Central Queensland, Queensland, Australia created in March 2008 as a result of the report of the Local Government Reform Commission released in July 2007.

In the 2021 census, the Isaac Region had a population of 22,046 people.

== History ==
Yagalingu is an Australian Aboriginal language of Central Queensland. Its traditional language region was within the local government area of Isaac Region, from the headwaters of the Belyando River south to Avoca, north to Laglan, west to the Great Dividing Range, and east and south to Drummond Range.

Prior to 2008, the Isaac Region was an entire area of three previous and distinct local government areas:

- the Shire of Belyando;
- the Shire of Broadsound (taking its name from Broad Sound);
- and the Shire of Nebo.

The report recommended that the new local government area should not be divided into wards and should elect eight councillors and a mayor. The Isaac Regional Council covers an area of 58,708 square kilometres (22,667 sq mi), had a population in 2018 of 20,934 and an operating budget of A$46.0m.

The region takes its name from the Isaac River, which in turn takes its name from Queensland pioneer Frederick Isaac who accompanied the explorer Ludwig Leichhardt on his first expedition.

== Towns and localities ==
The Isaac Region includes the following settlements:

Belyando area:

- Belyando
- Blair Athol^{*}
- Clermont
- Elgin
- Frankfield
- Kilcummin
- Laglan
- Mistake Creek
- Moranbah
- Winchester

Broadsound area:

- Carmila
- Clairview
- Clarke Creek
- Dysart
- Flaggy Rock
- Greenhill
- Ilbilbie
- Mackenzie River
- Middlemount
- St Lawrence
- The Percy Group
- Valkyrie

Nebo area:

- Coppabella
- Elphinstone
- Glenden
- Nebo
- Suttor

^{*} - The former town of Blair Athol, obliterated by the Blair Athol coal mine was within the region.

== Islands ==
Isaac also includes several uninhabited islands, including the Flat Isles, with Avoid Island, which is an important habitat for the flatback sea turtle.

== Libraries ==
Isaac Regional Council operates public libraries in Carmila, Clermont, Dysart, Glenden, Middlemount, Moranbah, Nebo, and St Lawrence.

== Mayors ==
- 2008–2012: Cedric Marshall
- 2012–2024 : Anne Michelle Baker
- 2024–present : Kelly Maree Vea Vea

== Demographics ==
The populations given relate to the component entities prior to 2008.

Year	Total Region	Belyando	Broadsound	Nebo
1933	4,971	2,987	1,590	394
1947	5,016	3,067	1,415	534
1954	5,088	3,104	1,537	447
1961	5,367	3,253	1,539	575
1966	5,101	2,997	1,625	479
1971	7,200	4,834	1,589	777
1976	11,389	7,210	3,379	800
1981	15,522	7,700	6,908	914
1986	22,133	11,362	8,419	2,352
1991	22,188	11,082	8,472	2,634
1996	20,703	10,755	7,486	2,462
2001	19,013	9,883	6,601	2,529
2006	19,820	10,455	6,843	2,522
2016	20,940			
2021	22,046			
