= Collinsville Cemetery, Queensland =

Heritage-listed cemetery in Australia

Collinsville Cemetery
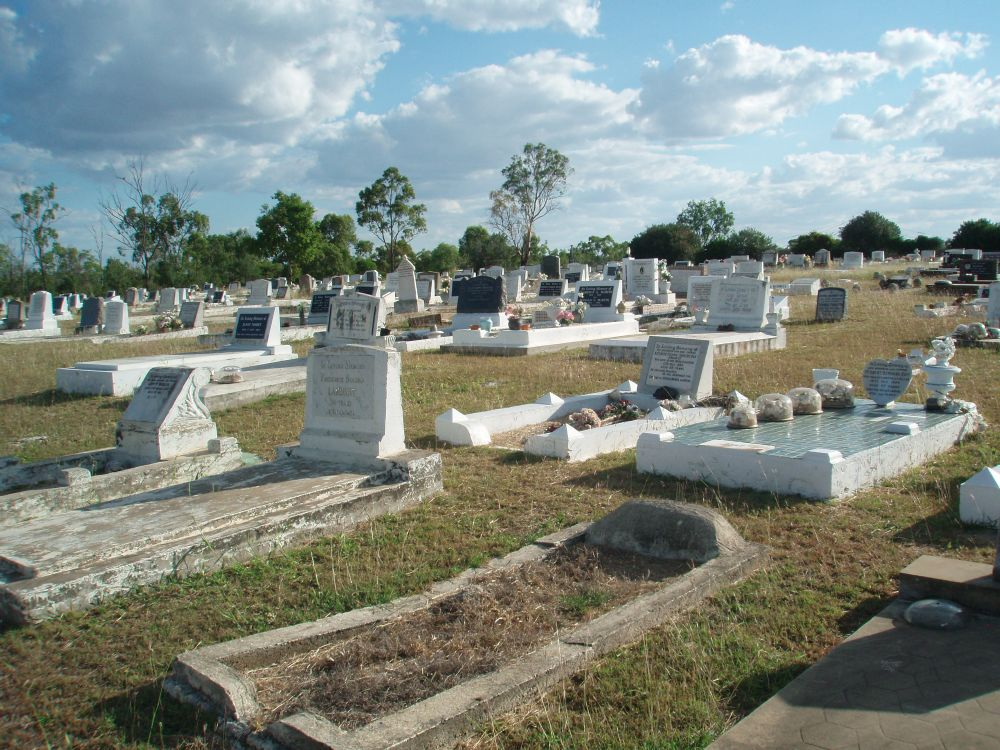
- Collinsville Cemetery, 2007

- Location within Queensland Location within Australia
- 20.5686°S 147.8369°E
- Location: Collinsville-Scottville Road, Collinsville, Whitsunday Region, Queensland, Australia

History
- Design period: 1919–1930s (interwar period)
- Built: 1927 –

Queensland Heritage Register
- Official name: Collinsville Cemetery, Collinsvillle-Scottville Cemetery
- Type: state heritage (built, landscape)
- Designated: 18 September 2009
- Reference no.: 602730
- Significant period: 1927–

Collinsville Cemetery is a heritage-listed cemetery at Collinsville-Scottville Road, Collinsville, Whitsunday Region, Queensland, Australia. It was built from 1927 onwards. It is also known as Collinsville-Scottville Cemetery. It was added to the Queensland Heritage Register on 18 September 2009.

== History ==
The Collinsville Cemetery was gazetted in 1927, to serve the mining townships of Collinsville and the smaller Scottville. It was the second cemetery in Collinsville. The first proved unsuitable because of the hardness of the soil. Buried within the Collinsville Cemetery are the seven miners killed in the major accident at Collinsville State Mine on 13 October 1954.

The town of Collinsville was originally named Moongunya; a name that is said to be an Aboriginal word meaning "coal". This name was given to the town by the Railway Department when Moongunya consisted of bag humpies, bark huts, corrugated-iron shacks and canvas tents. In 1918 the site for the Collinsville State Mine site was chosen and in March 1919 the mine began operations. As the Queensland State Government decided that the town would service the State Coal Mine and that it would be a model of a good contemporary township it was renamed Collinsville in 1921 for the MLA of Bowen, Charles Collins who represented Bowen from 1915 until his death in 1936.

By building a model township it was the Government's intention to eliminate the huts, tents, humpies and shacks from the townscape. The government subsequently commissioned the Town Planning Association to advise on the layout of the town. The administration of the town became the responsibility of the Department of Mines.

By 1922 almost 100 lots had been sold and Collinsville comprised 20 miners' houses, a store, police station, butcher shop and a school. By 1925 the town boasted a population of approximately 800 and had a licensed hotel, picture show, dance hall, bowling-green, a number of shops and a hospital under construction. Two large tanks provided the town with water, with electricity being generated by the mine. The rents paid by the miners covered all their water, electricity and insurance needs.

A cemetery was established to the north of Collinsville but being situated on very hard ground explosives had to be used to excavate each of the gravesites. In 1925, because of the difficulties in excavating gravesites, the Bowen Independent advocated that the current cemetery be abandoned and a new cemetery be identified and gazetted "that will not necessitate a person qualifying to becoming a corpse giving two days notice of demise".

In late 1925, at the request of the shire council, a public meeting was called by the Collinsville Labor Party for the purpose of appointing trustees for the Collinsville Cemetery. Trustees appointed included Messrs. D. Malcolm, G. Ogg and C. Hearn, all of Collinsville, and Messrs J. Nolan, J. Duncan and R. Natrass, who would represent Scottville.

The Collinsville Cemetery was gazetted on 3 March 1927. It comprised 20 acres (8.1 ha) between the sanitary reserve and Corduroy Creek. The earliest grave in the cemetery is that of Agnes Ramage who died on 11 September 1927, aged 33 years.

=== Collinsville Mine Disaster ===
The Collinsville Cemetery is also the burial place of those killed in the Collinsville mine disaster. Seven men died in the Number One Tunnel of the Collinsville State Coal Mine at 5.50 p.m. on Wednesday 13 October 1954. At the time, about 40 miners were working underground. The cause of disaster was attributed to a gas outburst in which the carbon dioxide gas said to be almost pure at 98 percent filled the mine shaft and the miners asphyxiated.

Two other men were badly affected by the gas and subsequently hospitalised. Mining personnel and the local Collinsville District Hospital Superintendent, Dr M.J. McEniery rallied together to rescue those still alive and to recover the bodies of those killed in the disaster. By 11 p.m. on the night of the disaster the bodies of the miners killed had been recovered.

News of the disaster prompted widespread expressions of sympathy. Messages were received from miners across the country, many of whom held work stoppages, including miners at the two state-owned mines of Mount Mulligan and Styx Number Three, to allow them to honour their colleagues killed in the disaster. A total of 38 officials representing various unions signed a Queensland Trades and Labour Council telegram of sympathy and the Red Flag was flown at half mast at the Brisbane Trades Hall. Condolence messages were also received from waterside workers, seamen, meatworkers, building and railway workers, the Australian Workers Union, the State Parliamentary Labour Party, the Communist Party, the Eureka Youth League, the Union of Australian Women and the Royal Australian Air Force at Townsville.

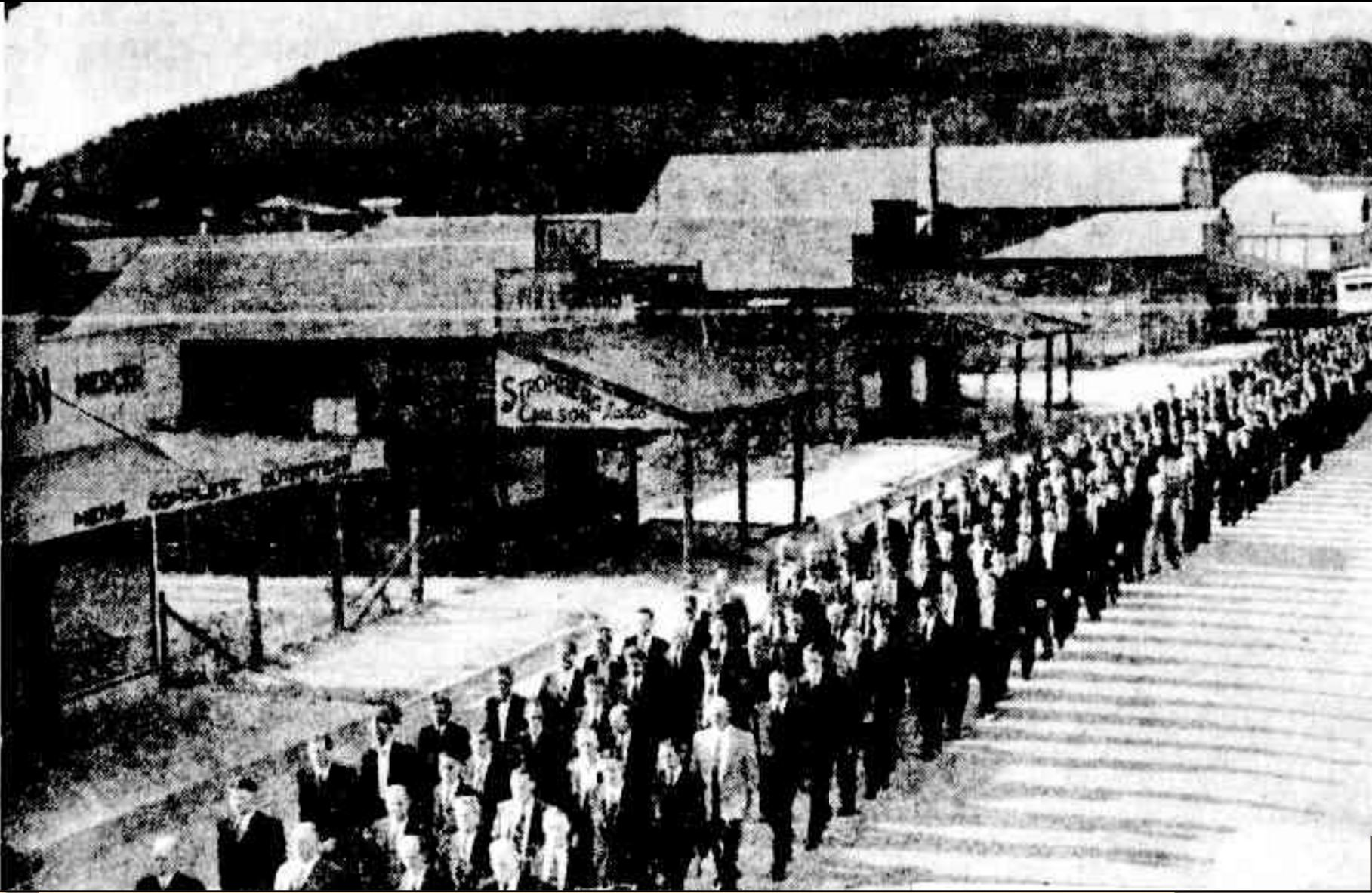
Miners marching at the head of the funeral procession from Anzac Hall to the Collinsville Cemetery, Thursday 14 October 1954

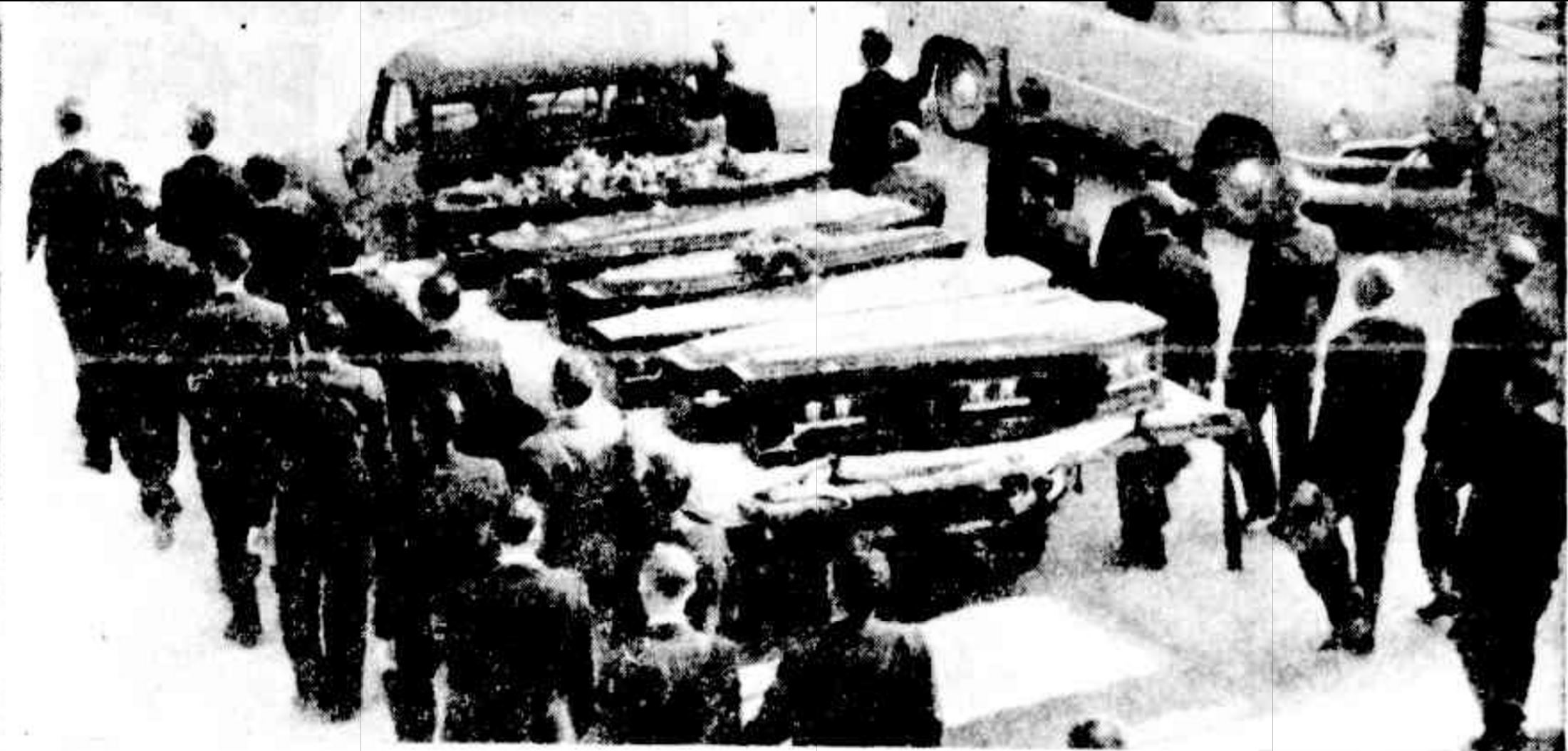
Miners marching beside the truck bearing the coffins in the funeral procession, Thursday 14 October 1954

The funeral for the seven miners was held on Thursday 14 October 1954 in Collinsville. The funeral service was held in ANZAC Hall and was conducted by Mr E. Finch, a local storekeeper who read the sermon every Sunday at the church. He was assisted by the Reverend A. Angel, a Methodist minister from Bowen. The service was held at 4 p.m. and the funeral procession set off for the cemetery at 4.30 p.m. The cortege was led by a procession of miners as was the traditional mining custom, with the wives and children of the deceased miners following in cars. About 2000 people attended and took part in the 2.4 kilometres (1.5 mi) procession to the Collinsville Cemetery.

At the funeral there was a large representation of union officials which included the Miners' Federation general president Idris William and Queensland officials Tom Miller, Pat Conway and Jack Pocock. The Waterside Workers' Federation national industrial officer Norm Docker attended as did numerous representatives of other unions.

Following the disaster, mineworkers from far and wide contributed to a fund to help the bereaved families and the Brisbane Telegraph set up a fund to receive contributions from the general public.

The disaster had come after a protracted dispute between the miners and the state government. In 1951 the state government had appointed Athol Lightfoot as general manager of State Coal Mines and Coke Works. Lightfoot subsequently targeted the Collinsville State Mine for mechanisation with his plan to mechanise Tunnel Number One despite opposition from the miners because of its steep grades and constant leakage of carbon dioxide. However, mechanisation of Tunnel Number One went ahead despite the mining union having recommended that if mechanisation were to occur it should be implemented in Tunnel Number Two. The union had also requested that the government allow Miners' Federation NSW Northern District's check inspector Jack Barrett, with his considerable experience in underground mines both in New South Wales and internationally, to make an inspection of the Collinsville State Mine. The Government refused the request. However, in the month before the disaster Lightfoot, who had planned and implemented the mechanisation, resigned from his position as general manager of State Coal Mines and Coke Works.

Initially, following the disaster, the Gair Government agreed to hold a Mining Warden's Inquiry in which miners would be able to give evidence. An initial sitting of the Mining Warden's Inquiry was held on 15 November 1954 with an adjournment to 22 November 1954. But the Gair Government then scrapped the inquiry after hastily putting through parliament a Bill which prevented any further proceedings.

The government then decided to hold a Royal Commission after initially refusing the Miners' Union request for such a commission. This turnaround caused the unions to suspect the government had an ulterior motive and a 24-hour stoppage was held at Collinsville and 30 other mines.

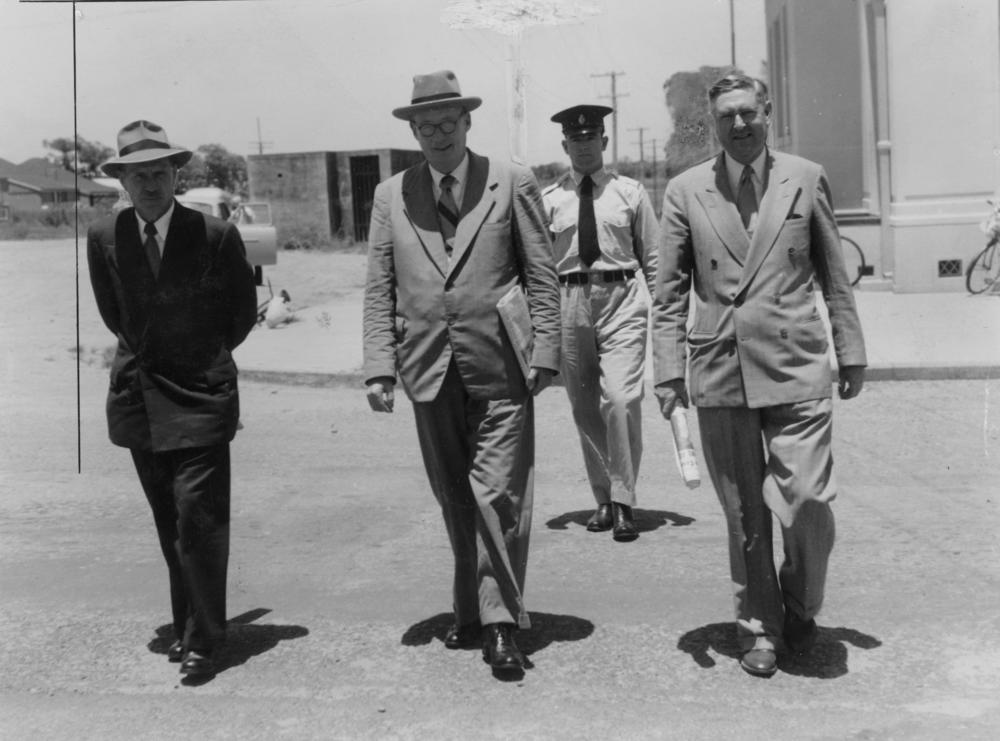
Members of the Collinsville Royal Commission at Bowen, at the front: Walter Scott, Justice Sheehy (chairman) and Septimus Flowers, 1 December 1954

The mining union then requested that a union representative be included on the Royal Commission but this was refused. On 2 December 1954 the Royal Commission was set up. Its members were Judge Sheehy, Walter Scott and Septimus Flowers with Solicitor-General W.E. Ryan being appointed to assist. The first session of the Commission was held 7 December 1954 and continued into 1955 with 13 days of hearing in Bowen and 66 days in Brisbane.

The report of the Collinsville Royal Commission was delivered in early 1956. The findings were that: "The actions of the Minister for Mines throughout were wise and correct. There are no grounds for criticism against the Government, any Minister for mines, the Department of Mines or any officers who played any part in the procedures and decisions to mechanise the mine". Reaction by the unions to the findings of the Commission were that the Commission was "falling over backwards to whitewash the Government for its obvious responsibility for the conditions that developed at Collinsville".

The Collinsville State Mine continued to operate until May 1961 at which time the Nicklin Country Liberal Party Government closed it.

Over the years that the Collinsville State Mine and the Bowen Consolidated Colliery were in operation, from the early 1920s to the early 1960s, a total of 24 miners (including the seven miners killed in the disaster of 1954) have been fatally injured working. Four miners were killed at the Bowen Consolidated Colliery while the remaining 20 were killed at the Bowen/Collinsville State Mine. Many of the miners killed in the mines are buried in the Collinsville Cemetery.

Mining disasters such as the 1954 accident at Collinsville usually led to improvements in mine safety. The Collinsville accident led to the addition of new safety provisions in the Act. These required Mine Deputies to undertake statutory examinations and to carry flame safety lamps and gas detectors during inspections. Subsequent disasters have led to additional legislative changes.

To commemorate the lives lost in the 1954 disaster the Collinsville and Scottville communities hold a memorial service each year on 13 October. In 2004 the 50th anniversary commemorations were held in Collinsville with the families and friends of all seven miners killed in attendance. The commemorations were held at the Collinsville Coal Face Experience in the United Mineworkers' Club. The Coal Face Experience pays tribute to all who worked in the mines "in particular memorialising the seven who died" in 1954.

The victims of the Collinsville tragedy continue to be remembered by the state's coal miners together with those of the Mount Mulligan disaster, the Box Flat explosion (1972) and the three major accidents at Moura (1975, 1986 and 1994). The Collinsville accident is often referred to at memorial events held by the industry including the inaugural Miners Memorial Day held in Brisbane on 19 September 2008.

== Description ==
The Collinsville Cemetery is accessed via a long lane from Collinsville-Scottville Road between the townships of Collinsville and Scottville. It contains a headstone section, a lawn section and a columbarium. There is a small shelter in the grounds.

The lawn section of the cemetery contains a series of inclined concrete strips. These bear plaques showing the details of the deceased. Flowers and other ornaments are placed on the concrete strips close to the plaques. A line of foxtail palms (Wodyetia bifurcata) are planted along the western side of this section.

The columbarium is located in the lawn section. This is a brick wall containing a series of cavities some of which contain urns. Three rows of cavities in the middle of the wall are larger than the two rows above and three rows beneath. White concrete coping on top of the wall projects some distance from the sides and ends.

The shelter shed is located immediately opposite the front gate in the headstone section of the cemetery. This structure has a gable roof supported on one side by a wall constructed of concrete blocks and on the other side by two wooden posts. There is a wooden bench against the inside of the wall. The shelter is shaded by a mid-sized native tree.

There is a range of monuments within the cemetery including headstones, sarcophagi, obelisks, altars and columns. They are constructed in a variety of styles and materials and feature a wide range of inscriptions. The headstones are made of materials including marble, granite, concrete and terrazzo, and vary from simple rounded or pointed tablets to elaborate memorials ornamented with angels, bibles, and crosses.

The miners killed in the 1954 accident are buried in two rows of graves, five in one row and two in the other. From left to right, the graves are of Alexander Parkinson, Peter S Miller, James Reid Logan, Herbert Bernard Ruff and Arthur Henry Shrubsole. In the second row the graves are of Frederick Ernest Walker and Henry Peterson.

Parkinson's grave plot is covered with a low concrete plinth topped with pale blue ceramic tiles. It has a plain, concrete headstone bearing a dark coloured plaque with white lettering.

Miller's grave plot is covered with a low, stepped concrete plinth with a patterned top. It has a plain, concrete headstone. The inscription is in silver metal lettering on a marble tablet. There are small concrete urns on either side of the headstone holding artificial flowers.

Logan's plot is surrounded by a low concrete grave curb. The headstone comprises a central section with a curved top flanked by two pilasters. A dark coloured terrazzo tablet fixed to the front bears the inscription in white lettering.

Ruff's plot is covered by a low concrete plinth. It is topped with small, mid-blue, ceramic tiles; a white tiled cross is located to the right near the head. The inscription, in black lettering, is on an inclined, heart-shaped light coloured tablet. Small concrete urns are located at the two corners of the head of the grave.

Shrubsole's plot is surrounded by a low concrete grave curb. The headstone is light coloured terrazzo with the inscription in black lettering on a square inset section.

Walker is buried in a double plot; both plots are covered with a single unpainted concrete plinth. The headstone comprises a terrazzo bevel marker. It has an embossed bronze plaque with exposed bronze lettering against a black background.

Peterson's plot is surrounded by a low concrete grave curb. The headstone is concrete with a tablet shaped like an open book; the inscription is in black lettering on the left page.

Three pencil pines (Cupressus sempervirens) flank a short track that leads from the front gate to the shelter shed. The wide vehicular and narrower pedestrian gates are located next to each other and are flanked by wooden posts. The cemetery is surrounded by a chain-wire fence and is set in the midst of bushland.

== Heritage listing ==
Collinsville Cemetery was listed on the Queensland Heritage Register on 18 September 2009 having satisfied the following criteria.

The place is important in demonstrating the evolution or pattern of Queensland's history.

As the burial place of at least 23 miners killed between 1928 and 1954 at Bowen Consolidated Colliery and at the Collinsville (Bowen) State Mine, the cemetery provides tangible evidence of the dangers of underground coal mining in the first part of the 20th century and so demonstrates an important aspect of Queensland's mining history.

The cemetery contains the graves of the seven men killed in the October 1954 accident at Collinsville State Mine, Queensland's worst mining disaster for over 30 years. As such it is closely associated with an event that brought the issue of mine safety to public attention throughout the state and prompted legislated changes to mine safety practises.

The place has a strong or special association with a particular community or cultural group for social, cultural or spiritual reasons.

As the burial place of the seven miners killed in one of the state's worst mining accidents, the cemetery has an association for mining industry workers throughout the state with all miners who have lost their lives at work. Together with other major mining accidents, the Collinsville accident is frequently mentioned in memorial ceremonies commemorating accidental deaths in the industry.
