= Mount Wyatt, Queensland =

Mount Wyatt
- Suburb
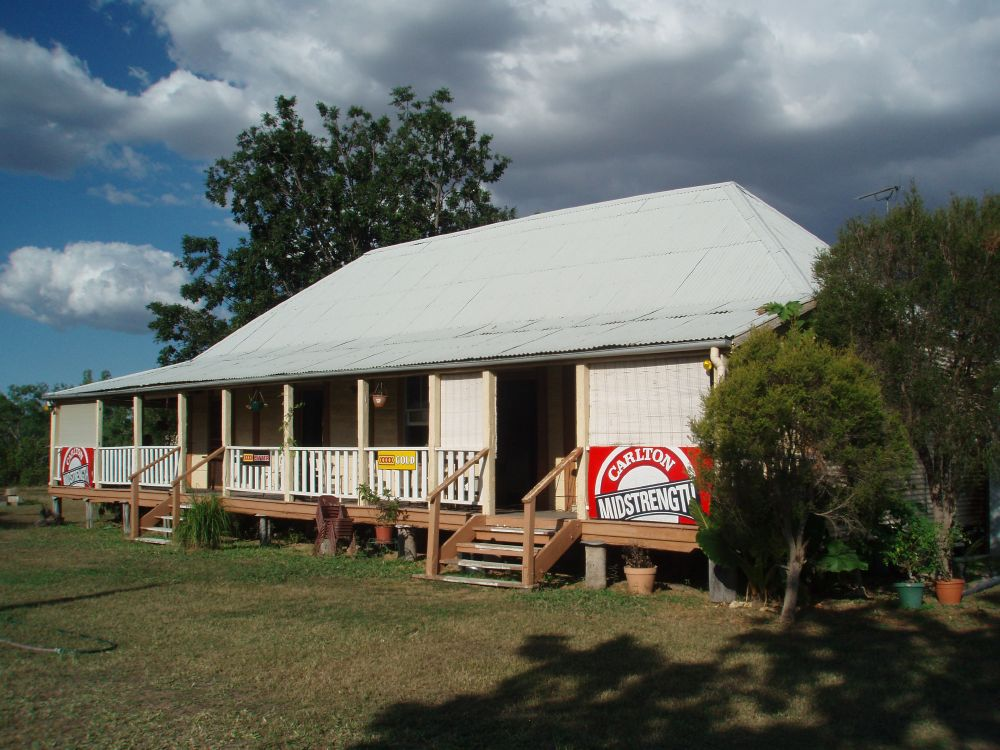
- Bowen River Hotel, 2007

- Interactive map of Mount Wyatt
- Coordinates: 20.7261°S 147.2647°E
- Country: Australia
- State: Queensland
- LGA: Whitsunday Region
- Location: 84 km (52 mi) SW of Collinsville; 162 km (101 mi) SW of Bowen; 223 km (139 mi) WSW of Proserpine; 355 km (221 mi) S of Townsville; 1,246 km (774 mi) NNW of Brisbane

Government
  - State electorate: Burdekin
  - Federal division: Capricornia

Area
  - Total: 3,411.4 km^{2} (1,317.1 sq mi)

Population
  - Total: 34 (2021 census)
  - Density: 0.00997/km^{2} (0.0258/sq mi)
- Time zone: UTC+10:00 (AEST)
- Postcode: 4804
Suburbs around Mount Wyatt
Eight Mile Creek	Bogie	Bogie
Ravenswood	Mount Wyatt	Springlands
Seventy Mile	Mount Coolon	Newlands

Mount Wyatt is a mountain and rural locality in the Whitsunday Region, Queensland, Australia. In the 2021 census, Mount Wyatt had a population of 34 people.

== Geography ==
The Burdekin Dam is on the western boundary of the locality. The Suttor River which flows into the Burdekin Dam forms the south-western boundary of the locality; the Sellheim River flows through the south-western part of the locality into the Suttor River. The Burdekin River (upstream from the dam) forms the north-western boundary; the Bowen River flows through the northern part of the locality into the Burdekin River.

The predominant land use is grazing on native vegetation. There are some mines in the south of the locality, mining copper, silver, and gold.

There are many mountains in the locality:

Mount Wyatt has the following mountains:

- Cramoisie Cliff (Red Bluff) (20.9714°S 146.9611°E) 399 metres (1,309 ft)
- Earlscliffe (20.8659°S 147.3128°E) 424 metres (1,391 ft)
- Fairview Hill (20.9553°S 146.9691°E) 350 metres (1,150 ft)
- Havilah Hill (20.8684°S 147.2789°E) 346 metres (1,135 ft)
- House And Kitchen Hills (20.7995°S 147.0954°E) 356 metres (1,168 ft)
- Les Jumelles (20.9520°S 147.1294°E) 249 metres (817 ft)
- Little Tor (20.6371°S 147.4836°E) 215 metres (705 ft)
- Mount Battery (20.9763°S 147.1339°E) 305 metres (1,001 ft)
- Mount Constance (20.7190°S 147.3970°E) 572 metres (1,877 ft)
- Mount Dalrymple (20.9417°S 147.0896°E) 379 metres (1,243 ft)
- Mount Ely (20.8405°S 147.4273°E) 524 metres (1,719 ft)
- Mount Joe-De-Little (20.8878°S 147.2102°E) 348 metres (1,142 ft)
- Mount Johnnycake (20.4056°S 147.3954°E) 166 metres (545 ft)
- Mount Landsborough (20.8906°S 147.3290°E) 552 metres (1,811 ft)
- Mount Magnus (20.7725°S 147.3824°E) 523 metres (1,716 ft)
- Mount Marian (20.7831°S 147.4169°E) 512 metres (1,680 ft)
- Mount McConnel (20.6569°S 147.0061°E) 474 metres (1,555 ft)
- Mount Puffandwheeze (20.9262°S 147.1576°E) 313 metres (1,027 ft)
- Mount Richardson (20.9388°S 147.2589°E) 376 metres (1,234 ft)
- Mount Roscow (20.9451°S 147.3448°E) 448 metres (1,470 ft)
- Mount Stone (20.8713°S 146.9843°E) 306 metres (1,004 ft)
- Mount Wickham (20.4343°S 147.4378°E) 552 metres (1,811 ft)
- Mount William Philpott (20.9139°S 147.2975°E) 455 metres (1,493 ft)
- Mount Wyatt (20.8964°S 147.2644°E) 456 metres (1,496 ft)
- Peak John (20.8057°S 147.3857°E) 409 metres (1,342 ft)
- Red Hill (20.5319°S 147.5095°E) 246 metres (807 ft)
- Reginald Peak (20.8420°S 147.3063°E) 440 metres (1,440 ft)
- Rutherfords Table (20.9562°S 147.2146°E) 325 metres (1,066 ft)
- The Garth (20.6512°S 147.4956°E) 346 metres (1,135 ft)
- The Pyramid (20.9272°S 147.0723°E) 364 metres (1,194 ft)
- The Scrag (20.6951°S 146.9962°E) 150 metres (490 ft)
- Tor Gabrielle (20.6294°S 147.4979°E) 255 metres (837 ft)

== Demographics ==
In the 2016 census, Mount Wyatt had a population of 51 people.

In the 2021 census, Mount Wyatt had a population of 34 people.

== Heritage listings ==
Mount Wyatt has a number of heritage-listed sites, including:

- Bowen River Hotel, Strathbowen-Leichhardt Range Road

== Education ==
There are no schools in Mount Wyatt. The nearest government primary and secondary schools are Collinsville State School and Collinsville State High School, both in Collinsville to the east. There is also a Catholic primary school in Collinsville. However, most of Mount Wyatt is too distant for a daily commute to the schools in Collinsville; the alternatives are distance education and boarding school.
