= Strathmore Homestead =

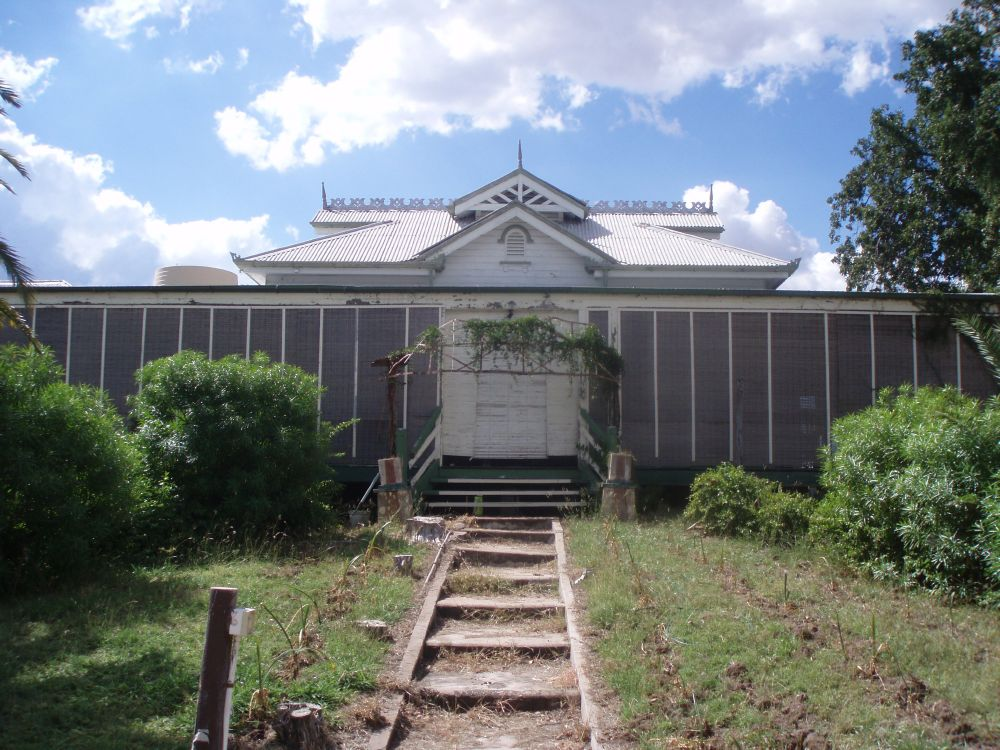
- Strathmore Homestead, 2007

- Location within Queensland Location within Australia
- 20.4982°S 147.6299°E
- Location: Strathmore Road, Springlands, Whitsunday Region, Queensland, Australia

Queensland Heritage Register
- Official name: Strathmore Homestead, Strathmore Station
- Type: state heritage (built)
- Designated: 13 November 2008
- Reference no.: 602683
- Significant period: 1860s

Strathmore Homestead is a heritage-listed homestead at Strathmore Station on Strathmore Road, Springlands, Whitsunday Region, Queensland, Australia. It was built from the 1860s onward. It is also known as Strathmore Station. It was added to the Queensland Heritage Register on 13 November 2008.

== History ==
Strathmore Homestead is located on the north side of Strathmore Road at Springlands, about 27 kilometres (17 mi) by road north-west of Collinsville.

First established in the early 1860s Strathmore Homestead has evolved to comprise a large number of buildings, structures and yards constructed from possibly the earliest establishment of the site through the nineteenth century to the latter part of the twentieth century. Structures include a slab hut (currently used to accommodate the kitchen and dining room for station personnel), main homestead, laundry, office, stables, meathouses, swimming pool complex, various cottages, homestead gardens, former school, former zoo, sheds, weir and a private cemetery.

Strathmore was leased in 1862 by PF Selheim who was connected in partnership with CW Touissant until September 1865 when new lease claimants were William Tucker and William Duncan Stewart. Tucker was still at Strathmore in 1870. In 1872 Leopold De Salis leased Strathbogie which was to form part of what was consolidated into Strathmore in 1885. De Salis had leased Strathmore by 1875 in partnership with A Macdonald. This began a business partnership that was to continue until 1890 when the Union Bank of Australia acquired the lease. De Salis was a pastoralist and politician and began acquiring properties in New South Wales in the mid-1840s.

In 1885 De Salis petitioned to consolidate a number of runs into Strathmore. However the consolidation did not occur until 1890 when De Salis, with his brother Henry, re-applied for a consolidation. In July 1890 the Strathmore runs included Strathmore, East Downs, Binjee, Mullar, Dirrill, Tullick, Glenking, West Downs, Mount Wickham, Harvest Home, Boundary, Strathbogie and Wengeur. These were divided between the settled and unsettled districts within the North Kennedy Pastoral District.

By October of the same year the De Salis brothers and Henry Fane De Salis transferred the Strathmore brand to the Union Bank of Australia. With debts of over £100 000, Leopold De Salis returned to New South Wales and was declared insolvent in 1898. The Union Bank held the lease to Strathmore for a number of years with managers on the property.

The year 1902 saw the beginning of a partnership between William Oswald Gilchrist, William Holden Watt with Arthur Henry Wickham Cunningham. This partnership was the beginning of an association of the Cunningham family with Strathmore that exists to the present day. William Oswald Gilchrist was the eldest son of John Gilchrist, a Scottish merchant, and his wife Isabella née Wilson. William Holden Watt was the son of Ernest Alexander Watt and his wife, Mary Jane née Holden.

Gilchrist followed his father, John Gilchrist, in the family firm of Gilchrist Watt and Sanderson Ltd. The firm tended not to invest directly in land but rather in advancing money to graziers, who in turn, bought their stores and had wool shipped through the firm. William Watt's father, Ernest, was a director of Gilchrist Watt and Sanderson Ltd. Ernest Watt did have an interest in the acquisition of pastoral properties and, besides Strathmore, his other cattle stations in Queensland included Glenprairie, outside of Rockhampton.

The Cunningham family is one of the oldest pastoral families in North Queensland. In April 1861 Edward Cunningham, father of AHW Cunningham, left Port Denison with four other men to explore the country west of Bowen in search of good pastoral runs. Cunningham took up Burdekin Downs, an area of 140,000 acres (57,000 ha). He did not reside on the property, living at Woodhouse Station, outside Ayr, until his death in 1898. AHW Cunningham was born in June 1879 and spent most of his life in North Queensland. At the age of 19, following his father's death, he took over the management of Woodhouse for Gilchrist Watt and Cunningham.

In 1902, following a devastating season for Woodhouse when 85 percent of the herd was lost, AHW Cunningham set about acquiring new land for re-stocking purposes. On his recommendation Gilchrist Watt and Cunningham purchased the lease for Strathmore Station at a cost of £50,000. Cunningham took up residence on Strathmore where the family has remained since.

A list of improvements dated 1906 values the main house at £1,000. One secondary source states that the homestead was constructed in 1903. This date is possible as the architectural style, including its ornamentation along the roof ridge, timber louvred gablets decorated with diagonal battens and the gabled pediment detailing on the south elevation marking the front entrance, indicate a late-nineteenth to early-twentieth century construction date. The year 1903 is also the year after the start of the Gilchrist, Watt and Cunningham partnership and the construction of a suitable residence may have been a priority for AHW Cunningham. Cunningham married Nellie Maud Wharton in May 1910 and the marriage produced four children: a daughter and three sons, one of whom was Edward Snr, born in 1914 and father of the present lessee, Edward Thomas Cunningham.

The 1906 list of improvements indicates that two kitchens existed on the property and the slab hut, for which a definite construction date has not been determined, may have been one of the kitchens. It is now used as staff sleeping quarters and storage with a later addition containing a dining room and kitchen. It is of slab construction and has a steeply pitched gabled roof over an original one-room-wide core, suggesting it may date from the mid-nineteenth century. Oral histories date the building as c. 1860s.

Other structures listed by July 1906 were shed and saddle room, stable and yards, men's hut, cottage, store and office, beef house, kitchen, kitchen no.2, blacksmith's shop, stockyards, 56 miles (90 km) of fencing, four wells and troughs. Stockyards and horse yards were also listed at Mount Wickham, one of the Strathmore paddocks at the time. The blacksmith shop may have been demolished as there is no building on the property which, through its form or fabric, suggests a blacksmithing use. Further construction on the site since 1906 includes two more meat houses, another cottage and a swimming pool. The 1906 list provides a good indication of how the head station on a large pastoral property functioned at this period.

On behalf of the partnership, AHW Cunningham controlled three properties: Strathmore (with its outstations of Strathbogie, Strathalbyn, Hidden Valley and Castleview), Woodhouse and Glenprairie. The combined area of these properties was 4,000 square kilometres (1,500 sq mi) with over 50,000 head of cattle.

AHW Cunningham was a member of the Queensland Turf Club, the Civic Club at Charters Towers, and the North Queensland and Tattersalls Club, Townsville. In the early years he established a thoroughbred stud and the Strathmore colours of green and orange were a regular sight at North Queensland race meetings. Cunningham was a foundation member of the North Queensland Amateur Turf Club in 1910. He succeeded the late JHS Barnes as president in 1912 and held the position until his death. He was also a committee member of the North Queensland Racing Association for many years.

Cunningham was keenly interested and involved in public and pastoral matters in the Bowen district. He was a member of the Wangaratta Shire Council for 39 years from August 1903, serving as councillor until he was elected chairman in February 1916, a position he held until his death on 8 January 1942. At the outbreak of World War I he had volunteered his services and, like a number of other pastoralists, was rejected on the grounds that he was working in an essential occupation.

Cunningham's son, Edward, started work on Strathmore following his schooling in Sydney. At the outbreak of World War II in 1939, he and his two brothers John and Henry enlisted in Townsville. Edward was recalled to assist with the management of Strathmore a short time later when his father fell ill and was discharged from the services as he worked in an essential occupation. Like his father, Edward Cunningham devoted a portion of his time to public affairs. He was chairman of the Bowen Shire Council from 1960 to 1966 and was on the board of directors for the Collinsville Coal Company. He was a member of the Queensland Cattleman's Association, founder of the Poll Devon Breed of cattle in Australia, founder of the Queensland Branch of the Devon Breeders Society in 1968 and its president until his retirement in 1985.

On 1 July 1959 a 53-year lease commenced on Strathmore that expires on 30 June 2012. This lease was transferred to Edward Cunningham, his brother Henry Keith Cunningham and his sister, Nellie Macmillan, wife of Murdoch Campbell Macmillan, on 15 July 1965. On 21 December 1993 Edward Cunningham was killed tragically. The lease was transferred to his son Edward Thomas Cunningham on 10 April 1996 and the Cunningham family connection with Strathmore continues.

Three members of the Cunningham family are buried near the main complex in a private cemetery:

- Edward Cunningham (2 December 1914 – 21 December 1993)
- Margaret Cunningham (10 March 1945 – 21 April 1945, daughter of Edward Cunningham)
- Wyatt Cunningham (19 November 1995 – 20 February 1999, son of Edward Thomas Cunningham).

== Description ==
Strathmore Homestead is located on a 41,000 hectares (100,000 acres) land lease on Strathmore Road at Springlands, about 27 kilometres (17 mi) by road north-west of Collinsville. The complex, situated to the north of Strathmore Road, comprises a homestead, laundry, slab hut (used to accommodate the kitchen and dining room for station personnel), office, stables, meat houses, swimming pool complex, various cottages, homestead gardens, sheds, former school, former zoo, weir and private cemetery.

=== Main residence ===
The main Strathmore residence is situated on a rocky rise adjacent to and south of Crush Creek. It is a large house of single-skin exposed timber-framed construction with wide verandahs on three sides and is elevated above its sloping site on a combination of timber stumps and steel posts. Attached on its western elevation is a hip-roofed, single-skin timber cottage, which houses the kitchen and utility rooms.

The large hipped corrugated galvanised iron roof is a feature of the homestead. It has ogee guttering and acroteria and is encircled by a veranda roof with quad guttering and acroteria. The ridge is defined by finials and diagonally battened, louvred gablets. At the southern end of the house, transverse roof vents with louvred projecting gables are decorated with finials and cresting. The gable on the southern elevation over the entrance contains a louvred vent.

The main entrance to the homestead is off the avenue lined with phoenix palms (Phoenix canariensis) and is accessed via a set of concrete stairs with decorative pillars to the timber stairway with handrail, and a trellis with trailing vines straddling the stairs. Additional entrances are located on the east and west sides.

A verandah encircles three sides of the building and is enclosed with matchstick timber blinds, some of which are fixed to the verandah framework externally with vertical battens. Ripple iron awnings provide weather protection to the eastern side of the building and rear northern verandah which is very wide and has parquetry flooring. French doors with fanlights lead from the veranda into the rooms of the homestead. The west section has been utilised for bathroom facilities and entry to the kitchen and utility section.

The main entrance comprises a four-panelled clear-finished timber door with fanlight and sidelights. All glazing panels including the arched panels in the sidelights and pairs of arched panels in the door are decorated with leadlight in an Art Nouveau inspired pattern. The entrance opens onto the central hallway which provides access to the living room, dining room and several bedrooms.

The walls and ceilings are lined with tongue and groove boards and the hallway ceiling has a small fretwork rose in its centre. Picture rails can be found in each of the rooms and a brick fireplace in the living room is encased in fibrous cement sheeting with cover battens.

=== Kitchen and utility section wing ===
The attached cottage housing the kitchen and several utility rooms is highset on a combination of timber stumps and steel posts. It is a single-skin timber-framed building with exposed studs and has a hipped roofline clad in corrugated galvanised iron with quad guttering. Windows are three-paned casements with metal window hoods along the southern and northern elevations and French doors leading off the verandah on its western elevation. Toilets and storage areas lined with ripple iron are located under the building.

=== Laundry and toilet block ===
The laundry and toilet block is a small timber-framed building clad with fibrous cement sheeting with a corrugated-iron gabled roof with no guttering located to the north-west of the homestead. It is a timber-framed building clad with fibrous cement. A concrete path leads from the homestead to the laundry.

=== Office (former schoolhouse) ===
The building currently used as Strathmore's office and storage area was formerly the schoolhouse. The office is in the room at the east end of the verandah. The building is low-set with exposed studs along its frontage which is covered by a verandah, chamferboards lining its sides and ripple iron at the rear. It has a hipped roof of corrugated galvanised iron with guttering. There are two sets of casement windows and several rooms are entered from the veranda. Each of the rooms is fully lined with vertical jointed tongue and groove boarding.

The rear section houses several rooms and is timber-framed with a combination of timber and ripple-iron cladding. The windows comprise sashes of nine panes.

The office houses the records of the workings of Strathmore from about 1903 onwards and a wide range of memorabilia in the form of photographs, awards, maps and books relating to Strathmore, and in particular to the Cunningham family.

Additions to the building include a small skillion-roofed extension at ground level adjacent to the verandah on the west with a small built- in room, formerly the school office when the school was conducted on the property, on the east end of the verandah.

=== Slab hut and additions ===
Purported to be the oldest building on the property, the slab hut (with later additions) is situated west of the main homestead. The hut is lowset on timber stumps and has a steep, gabled, corrugated galvanised iron roof with no guttering. Its external walls comprise vertical timber slabs with battens covering the joints and horizontal boarding forming the gable ends. A small louvred ventilator is located in each gable. A timber-framed verandah with corrugated galvanised iron roof is attached along one side of the building and an addition attached along the opposite side. The addition is timber framed with chamferboard cladding on a suspended concrete slab on a concrete block base and a skillion roof of corrugated galvanised-iron. Windows comprise casements with eight pane sashes, casements with three pane sashes and louvres. The central section of the back wall is screened and has a screen door opening to the dining section.

The internal walls of the hut are formed with horizontal slabs and each of the small rooms opens onto the verandah and into the addition at the rear. A central hall leads from the verandah to the addition that is accessed by a small set of timber stairs. The building accommodates staff sleeping quarters and storage in the slab hut section. The addition houses the dining room and kitchen.

=== Staff quarters (former school teacher's residence) ===
The former school teacher's residence is situated east of the office and west of the garage. It is a small timber-framed building set on concrete flooring. It has a hipped bungalow roofline clad in corrugated galvanised iron. The core of the cottage is single skin with exposed studding lined with vertical jointed tongue and groove boarding, the ceiling dropped with battens. The cottage has casement windows with decorative window hoods and glazed and metal louvres.

The lean-to housing the current kitchen is clad with chamferboards and has concrete flooring and a skillion roof of corrugated galvanised iron. A small concreted verandah fronts the building with the eastern end enclosed with two rows of concrete blocks, above which there is ripple iron.

The residence is used (in 2007) as staff quarters. It has a wide range of memorabilia relating to the Cunningham family, especially trophies won by their Poll Devon cattle when shown at various events.

=== Staff quarters ===
Immediately to the south of the main entrance to the homestead complex is the former head stockman's residence, which is currently used to house contractors. This building was not available for an internal inspection.

The building is timber-framed, primarily clad with chamferboards, and is elevated on concrete stumps with timber batten infill panels. Timber stairs with no handrails are located at front and rear. The building has a corrugated, galvanised-iron, hipped roofline that extends across the front and rear verandahs. The verandah is partially enclosed with shutters and open areas are shaded by timber blinds and awnings of flat metal sheeting. The west end of the rear verandah is built-in with chamferboards along its side and fibrous-cement sheeting on the rear. The house has casement windows and a brick chimney.

=== Meathouses ===
Several meathouses remain within the Strathmore Homestead complex. Two are not in use. A third was adapted for use as a museum but is currently used for storage. Each of the meathouses has a pyramidal roof of corrugated galvanised iron and none have guttering. The meathouse used for storage has partial walls of corrugated galvanised iron with boarded infill above. Its ceiling is lined with fibrous cement sheeting and cover battens. Shelving remains in place from its days as a museum. This meathouse is situated close to the homestead.

The two other meathouses are south-west of the homestead and are located adjacent to one another on different levels. Both are of timber frame and slab construction. The low-set meathouse has vertical timber slabs with wire netting infill above, while the high-set meat house is of drop-slab construction. Numerous artefacts from the days when the meathouses were in constant use remain within the two buildings, including chopping blocks, hooks for hanging meat, and wooden draining tables. Some of the cracks between the slabs have had flat iron sheeting fixed over to prevent the meat becoming fly-blown.

=== Cottages ===
A cottage situated north-west of the slab hut is a simple timber- framed building clad in painted corrugated galvanised iron set on low timber stumps. Paving from local stone off Strathmore provides flooring adjacent to the stairs leading to the front of the cottage. The broken-back roof is clad in corrugated galvanised iron and is steeply pitched across the main section of the cottage. Internally the cottage is lined with fibrous-cement sheeting and cover battens. The cottage contains several rooms with louvred windows, both glass and metal. Stairs lead down to the rear area, which has concrete flooring. A small timber and wire netting fence surrounds the cottage.

Another cottage is east of the slab hut. It is a timber-framed building set on rough bush timber stumps. The core of the cottage is single-skin with exposed studs and has a hipped roofline with guttering. Some of the interior walls are lined with wide v-jointed tongue and groove boarding and the ceiling is lined with fibrous cement sheeting with cover battens. Additions to the core of the cottage are of timber framing clad with fibrous cement sheeting to the front, and fibrous cement sheeting and ripple iron to the rear and louvred windows. Elevated on steel posts the building has a partially enclosed patio on the east side with timber and steel framing set on concrete flooring. The west side has been sheeted with ripple iron.

A third cottage is next to the stables, south-east of the homestead. It is a low timber-framed building with a hipped roof and a projecting end hip clad in corrugated galvanised iron with guttering. The building is lined in chamferboards and has casement windows. No internal inspection was undertaken.

=== Station oven ===
A disused brick oven is near the two disused meathouses. Set on a concrete slab, the oven is constructed entirely of orange coloured bricks with a chimney on its south-east corner. Stabilisation work has included bars affixed to the oven's length and cement above the oven doorway.

=== Station sheds and outbuildings ===
The mechanic's shed is a timber-framed, corrugated-iron clad shed west of the main residence. It has a gable roof, no guttering and an earthen floor. Outside the shed is a hand-pump petrol bowser that is no longer in use.

Other sheds and utility buildings scattered throughout the site serve a variety of purposes. The majority are of timber-framed construction with gabled rooflines clad in corrugated iron, while others are of obviously recent construction built of concrete block with roller doors. Not all the sheds are fully enclosed, dependent on the purpose for which they are being used.

=== Garage ===
The garage between the former school teacher's residence and the zoo is a timber-framed, corrugated galvanised-iron clad structure with a pyramidal roof. It has concrete flooring and the north elevation opens outwards to provide vehicular access.

=== Cattle yards ===
Strathmore has an extensive network of cattle yards constructed of rough bush timber that are west of the buildings within the homestead complex. Recently part of the yards were dismantled and relocated to the central business district of Bowen for inclusion in the movie set for the film "Australia".

=== Stables ===
The stables and their accompanying yards are south-west of the main residence and adjacent to Strathmore Road. Corrugated galvanised iron sheeting and vertical boarding clad the rough bush-timber framing of the stables. The yards and gates are also of rough bush timber; all are painted in the traditional white of Strathmore. These stables and yards once housed the racehorses and Poll Devon cattle for which Strathmore was renowned.

=== Swimming pool ===
The swimming pool is located east of the main residence and overlooks the creek from the high bank along its southern side. It is of concrete construction with a set of stairs in the north-west corner at its deep end. A concrete platform reached by a set of stairs is enclosed on three sides at the northern end by a wall comprising concrete posts and balustrade and pipe railing. Another concrete platform is located at the southern end adjacent to a steel framed shade structure with metal roof in the south-east corner. The pool is currently disused.

=== Strathmore private zoo ===
The zoo has a variety of enclosures. The enclosures are primarily constructed of metal posts and chain-wire mesh. Some of the enclosures are topped with barbed wire, others completely enclosed with wire mesh, while others have roofs of corrugated iron, depending on the inhabitant. Each of the enclosures has concrete flooring, some with ponds set into the floor others with small pools on top of the flooring. A number of the enclosures retain signage. The crocodile enclosure is away from the rest of the zoo and is adjacent to the swimming pool. Animals known to have been housed in Strathmore private zoo include buffalo, deer, monkeys, a camel, numerous bird species and a crocodile.

=== Weir ===
A small concrete weir extends across Crush Creek to the north-east of the swimming pool.

=== Cunningham family cemetery ===
The Strathmore family cemetery is on the southern bank of Crush Creek several hundred metres east of Strathmore Homestead. It has three marked graves all of which are of members of the Cunningham family over three generations.

The grave of Margaret Cunningham has a cambered concrete headstone set between two fluted pillars with a tablet of black granite with white lettering set between the pillars. The grave has kerbing and is completely concreted over. The inscription reads: "Sacred to the memory of Margaret Anne Cunningham Born 10th March 1945 Died 21st April 1945".

This grave of Edward Cunningham has a black granite headstone set on a concrete plinth. This headstone has two figures either side of the inscription, one is of a horse the other is of a bull, with both figures in black on a white background. The headstone is inscribed in gold lettering and reads: "In Loving Memory of Edward Cunningham 2-12-1914 - 21-12-1993 Don't fence me in".

The grave of Wyatt Cunningham has a Gothic style headstone of black granite on a concrete plinth with the inscription in white lettering. The grave is surrounded by a white decorative metal fence on a concrete base. The inscription reads: "In Loving Memory Of Wyatt Cunningham 19-11-1995 ~ 20-2-1999 Golden slumbers kiss your eyes, Smiles await you when you rise. Sleep my brave boy, do not cry And I will sing a lullaby. Thomas Dekker".

== Heritage listing ==
Strathmore Homestead was listed on the Queensland Heritage Register on 13 November 2008 having satisfied the following criteria.

The place is important in demonstrating the evolution or pattern of Queensland's history.

Strathmore Homestead is important for its historical significance illustrating the opening of the Kennedy District in northern Queensland for pastoralism. Established in 1862 Strathmore is of exceptional significance in Queensland's history as one of the earliest pastoral properties established in the region and for its continuous use as an operating pastoral station since its establishment.

The place demonstrates rare, uncommon or endangered aspects of Queensland's cultural heritage.

Strathmore Homestead is significant as it retains evidence of early building types such as the slab hut (c. 1860s), the core of which is now used as a living quarters for staff. As an example of a very early slab structure in this part of Queensland the building would be particularly important as an uncommon example.

The place is important in demonstrating the principal characteristics of a particular class of cultural places.

Strathmore Homestead demonstrates typical characteristics of a large pastoral station complex that evolved over time in a regional area of Queensland. The complex shows how a regional Queensland pastoral station functioned and the way of life of a homestead from the nineteenth to the twentieth century.

The principal built elements of Strathmore include the main homestead (c. 1900), a slab building now used as a staff kitchen and dining room, staff quarters/cottages, school room and school house, office, stables, meathouses, swimming pool complex, former zoo, a weir, sheds and yards. The buildings are set within landscaped grounds and there is a small cemetery nearby. The phoenix palm-lined main entrance to Strathmore is notable particularly as phoenix palms (Phoenix canariensis) are not common in North Queensland.

The place is important because of its aesthetic significance.

Strathmore Homestead is important for its aesthetic significance. The complex including the main homestead building and the avenue of phoenix palms leading to the entrance, the composition of elements including the slab building, cottages, stables and yards, and the patina of age provided by the variety of materials and forms, contribute to the picturesque qualities of the site.

The place has a special association with the life or work of a particular person, group or organisation of importance in Queensland's history.

Strathmore Homestead is particularly important for its association with the Cunningham family, one of the oldest pastoral families in North Queensland. The Cunninghams have been connected with the Bowen area since the early 1860s and with Strathmore since 1902, an association that continues to the present.
