= Gattonvale Offstream Storage =

- Location of the reservoir in Queensland
- Interactive map of Gattonvale Offstream Storage
- Country: Australia
- Location: 23 km (14 mi) southeast of Collinsville, Central Queensland
- Coordinates: 20°45′S 147°56′E
- Purpose: Water supply
- Status: Operational
- Opening date: December 2005
- Operator: Sunwater

Dam and spillways
- Type of dam: Reservoir; pumped from the Bowen River Weir
- Impounds: Off-stream

Reservoir
- Total capacity: 5,200 ML (180×10^{6} cu ft)

The Gattonvale Offstream Storage is a water reservoir located 23 kilometres (14 mi) southeast of Collinsville, Central Queensland, Australia. Situated adjacent to the Bowen River Weir, the reservoir is intended to improve reliability of water supply to the Collinsville Power Station, coal mines, and townships.

The storage is filled by pumping water from the Bowen River Weir during high flows in the river system during the wet season. Sunwater constructed the storage to a capacity of 5,200 megalitres (180×10^{6} cu ft), with the storage officially opened in December 2005.

== See also ==
- List of dams and reservoirs in Australia
