= Collinsville mine disaster =

1954 mine disaster in Queensland, Australia

Coordinates: 20°33′57″S 147°44′47″E

The Collinsville mine disaster on 13 October 1954 resulted in the death of seven men at the Collinsville coal mine in Collinsville, Queensland, Australia.

== Before the disaster ==
The coal in the mine was very porous. The floor in the "dip" (near the coal face) was usually covered in water due to both water cooled drilling operations and water leaking out of the surrounding rock. Throughout the life of the mine, miners had witnessed the floor constantly bubbling as black damp rose through the floor. The miners were aware that they were approaching the fault. Bubbling increased dramatically in the preceding days, described as producing, "fountains". The miners experienced increasing frequency of breathing difficulties but did not report it to the overman(manager.) Gas was blowing drilling dust back out of the hole without drillers needing to drive the drill bit back and forth to clear the dust for several days prior. These were all indications that they were approaching a dangerous type of fault, one containing an igneous intrusion, one in which a piece of rock protrudes across the fault, grinding the coal as it is dragged through the opposing side of the fault, causing the accumulation, production, adsorption and absorption of carbon dioxide as the coal decomposes, forming a pocket of highly compressed black damp.

=== Mechanization ===
Mechanization was unrelated to the disaster.

The disaster had come after a protracted dispute between the miners and the state government. In 1951 the Queensland Government had appointed Athol Lightfoot as general manager of State Coal Mines and Coke Works. Lightfoot subsequently targeted the Collinsville State Mine for mechanisation with his plan to mechanise Tunnel Number One despite opposition from the miners because of its steep grades and constant leakage of carbon dioxide. However, mechanisation of Tunnel Number One went ahead despite the mining union having recommended that if mechanisation were to occur it should be implemented in Tunnel Number Two. The union had also requested that the government allow Miners' Federation NSW Northern District's check inspector Jack Barrett, with his considerable experience in underground mines both in New South Wales and internationally, to make an inspection of the Collinsville State Mine. The Government refused the request. However, in the month before the disaster Lightfoot, who had planned and implemented the mechanisation, resigned from his position as general manager of State Coal Mines and Coke Works.

== Disaster ==
Seven men died in the Number One Tunnel of the Collinsville State Coal Mine at 5.50 pm on Wednesday 13 October 1954. At the time, about 40 miners were working underground. The cause of disaster was attributed to a gas outburst in which the carbon dioxide gas said to be almost pure at 98 percent filled the mine shaft and the miners asphyxiated.

Two other men were badly affected by the gas and subsequently hospitalised. These miners were Robert Munro and J.A. Baker. Mining personnel and the local Collinsville District Hospital Superintendent, Dr M.J. McEniery rallied together to rescue those still alive and to recover the bodies of those killed in the disaster. By 11 pm on the night of the disaster the bodies of the miners killed had been recovered.

News of the disaster prompted widespread expressions of sympathy. Messages were received from miners across the country, many of whom held work stoppages, including miners at the two state-owned mines of Mount Mulligan and Styx Number Three, to allow them to honour their colleagues killed in the disaster. A total of 38 officials representing various unions signed a Queensland Trades and Labour Council telegram of sympathy and the Red Flag was flown at half mast at the Brisbane Trades Hall. Condolence messages were also received from waterside workers, seamen, meatworkers, building and railway workers, the Australian Workers Union, the State Parliamentary Labour Party, the Communist Party, the Eureka Youth League, the Union of Australian Women and the Royal Australian Air Force at Townsville.

== Funerals ==
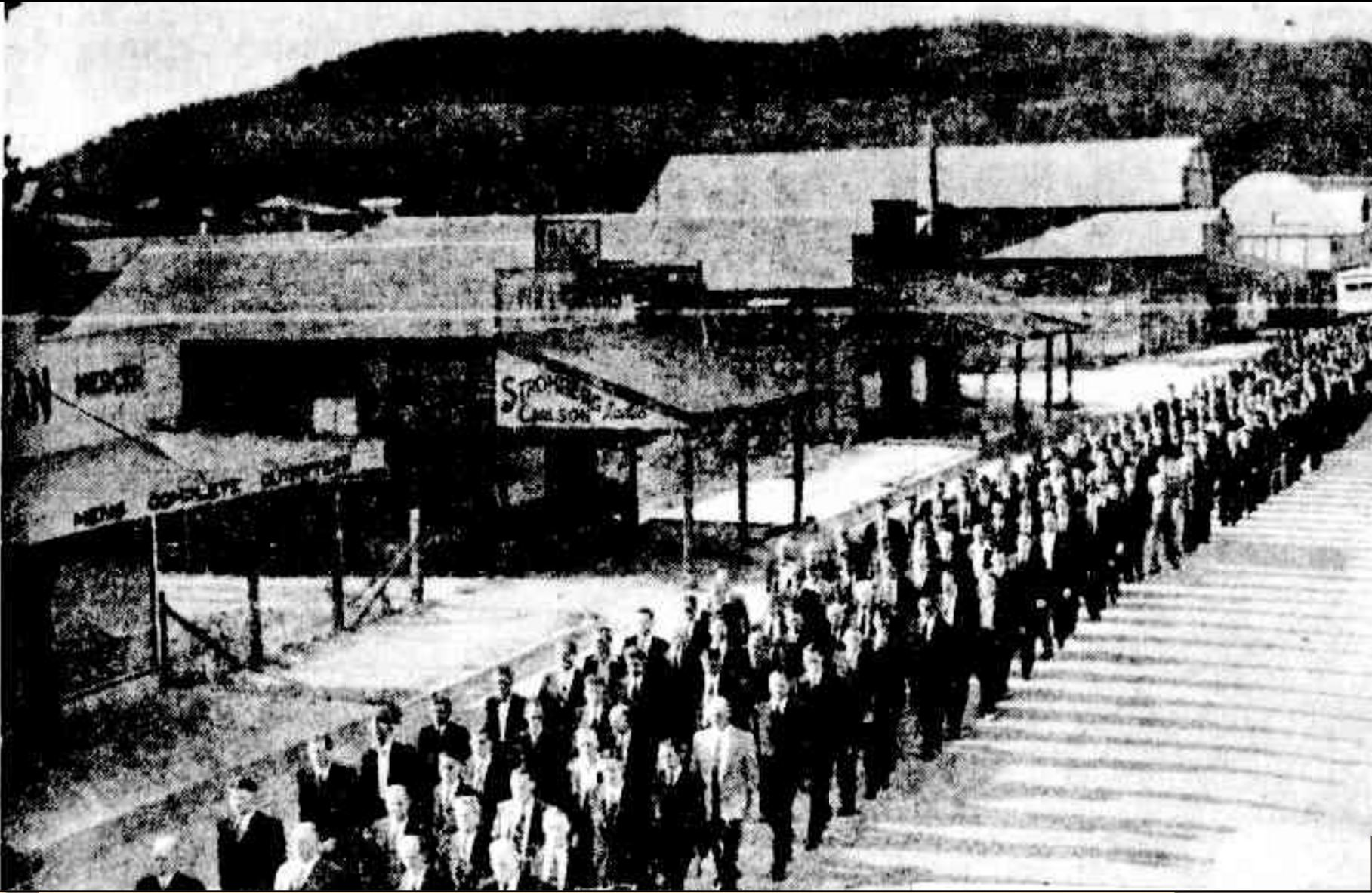
Miners marching at the funeral procession from Anzac Hall to the Collinsville Cemetery, Thursday 14 October 1954

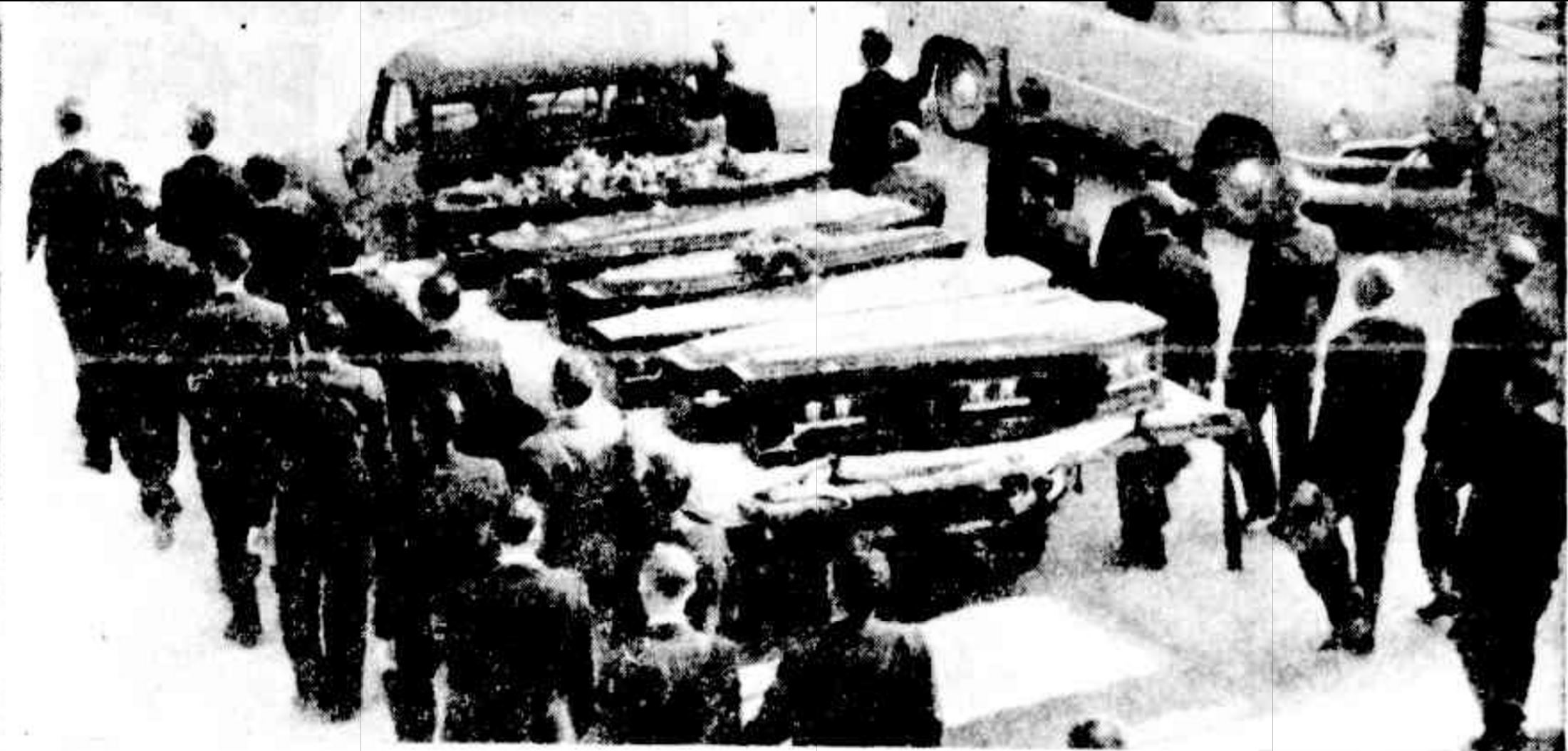
Miners marching beside the truck bearing the coffins in the funeral procession, Thursday 14 October 1954

The funeral for the seven miners was held on Thursday 14 October 1954 in Collinsville. The funeral service was held in ANZAC Hall and was conducted by Mr E. Finch, a local storekeeper who read the sermon every Sunday at the church. He was assisted by the Reverend A. Angel, a Methodist minister from Bowen. The service was held at 4 pm and the funeral procession set off for the Collinsville Cemetery at 4:30 pm. The cortege was led by a procession of miners as was the traditional mining custom, with the wives and children of the deceased miners following in cars. About 2,000 people attended and took part in the 2.4 km (1.5 mi) procession to the Collinsville Cemetery.

At the funeral there was a large representation of union officials which included the Miners' Federation general president Idris William and Queensland officials Tom Miller, Pat Conway and Jack Pocock. The Waterside Workers' Federation national industrial officer Norm Docker attended as did numerous representatives of other unions.

Following the disaster, mineworkers from far and wide contributed to a fund to help the bereaved families and the Brisbane Telegraph set up a fund to receive contributions from the general public.

== Inquiries ==
Initially, following the disaster, the Gair Government agreed to hold a Mining Warden's Inquiry in which miners would be able to give evidence. An initial sitting of the Mining Warden's Inquiry was held on 15 November 1954 with an adjournment to 22 November 1954. But the Gair Government then scrapped the inquiry after hastily putting through parliament a Bill which prevented any further proceedings.

The government then decided to hold a Royal Commission after initially refusing the Miners' Union request for such a commission. This turnaround caused the unions to suspect the government had an ulterior motive and a 24-hour stoppage was held at Collinsville and 30 other mines.

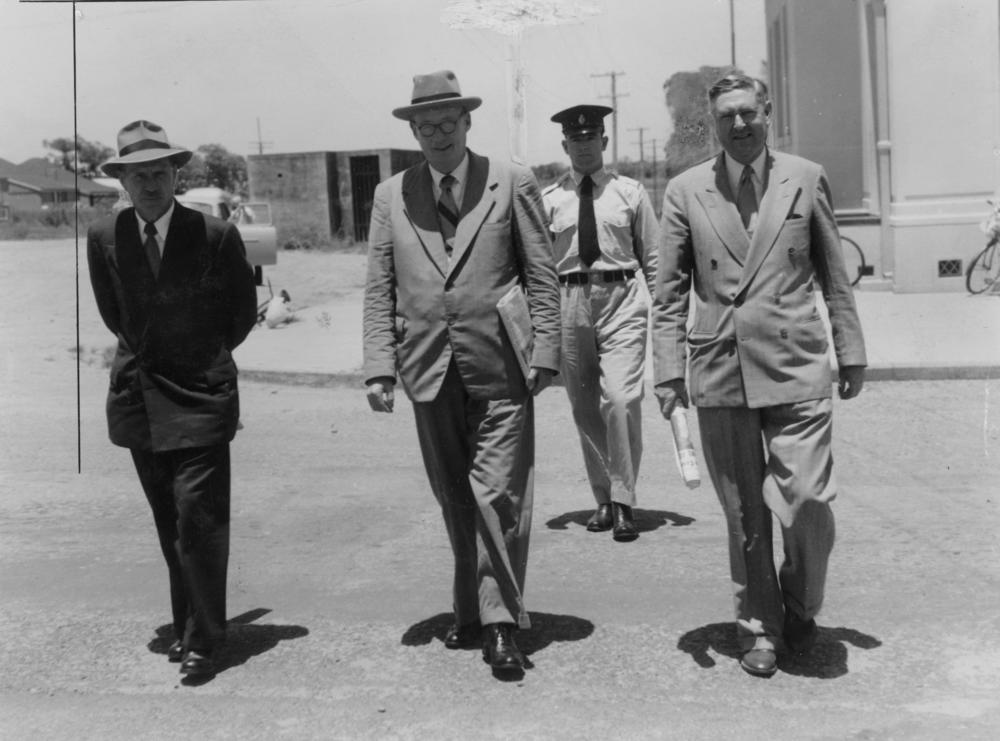
Members of the Collinsville Royal Commission: Walter Scott, Justice Sheehy (chairman) and Septimus Flowers, 1 December 1954

The mining union then requested that a union representative be included on the Royal Commission but this was refused. On 2 December 1954 the Royal Commission was set up. Its members were Judge Sheehy, Walter Scott and Septimus Flowers with Solicitor-General W.E. Ryan being appointed to assist. The first session of the Commission was held 7 December 1954 and continued into 1955 with 13 days of hearing in Bowen and 66 days in Brisbane.

The report of the Collinsville Royal Commission was delivered in early 1956. The findings were that: "The actions of the Minister for Mines throughout were wise and correct. There are no grounds for criticism against the Government, any Minister for mines, the Department of Mines or any officers who played any part in the procedures and decisions to mechanise the mine". Reaction by the unions to the findings of the Commission were that the Commission was "falling over backwards to whitewash the Government for its obvious responsibility for the conditions that developed at Collinsville".

== Aftermath ==
The Collinsville State Mine continued to operate until May 1961 at which time the Nicklin Country Liberal Party Government closed it.

Over the years that the Collinsville State Mine and the Bowen Consolidated Colliery were in operation, from the early 1920s to the early 1960s, a total of 24 miners (including the seven miners killed in the disaster of 1954) have been fatally injured working. Four miners were killed at the Bowen Consolidated Colliery while the remaining 20 were killed at the Bowen/Collinsville State Mine. Many of the miners killed in the mines are buried in the Collinsville Cemetery.

Mining disasters such as the 1954 accident at Collinsville usually led to improvements in mine safety. The Mount Mulligan accident (1921), resulting in the deaths of 75 men and boys, led to the introduction of the Coal Mining Act (1925) which included at least seven new safety provisions. Similarly, the Collinsville accident led to the addition of new safety provisions in the Act. These required Mine Deputies to undertake statutory examinations and to carry flame safety lamps and gas detectors during inspections. Subsequent disasters have led to additional legislative changes.

To commemorate the lives lost in the 1954 disaster the Collinsville and Scottville communities hold a memorial service each year on 13 October. In 2004 the 50th anniversary commemorations were held in Collinsville with the families and friends of all seven miners killed in attendance. The commemorations were held at the Collinsville Coal Face Experience in the United Mineworkers' Club. The Coal Face Experience pays tribute to all who worked in the mines "in particular memorialising the seven who died" in 1954.

The victims of the Collinsville tragedy continue to be remembered by the state's coal miners together with those of the Mount Mulligan disaster, the Box Flat explosion (1972) and the three major accidents at Moura (1975, 1986 and 1994). The Collinsville accident is often referred to at memorial events held by the industry including the inaugural Miners Memorial Day held in Brisbane on 19 September 2008.
