= Springlands, Queensland =

Springlands
- Suburb
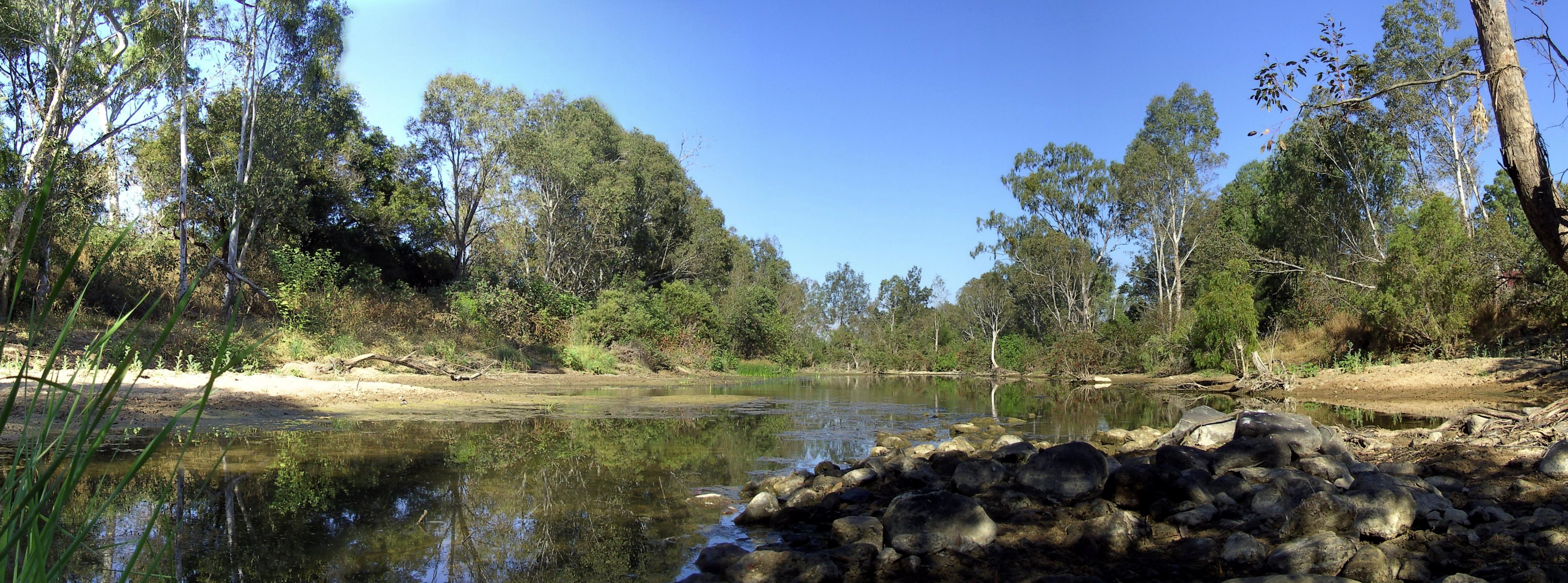
- Junction of Coral and Pelican Creeks, 2009

- Interactive map of Springlands
- Coordinates: 20.5763°S 147.7625°E
- Country: Australia
- State: Queensland
- LGA: Whitsunday Region
- Location: 107 km (66 mi) SW of Bowen; 167 km (104 mi) W of Proserpine; 292 km (181 mi) NW of Mackay; 294 km (183 mi) SSE of Townsville; 1,187 km (738 mi) NNW of Brisbane

Government
  - State electorate: Burdekin
  - Federal division: Capricornia

Area
  - Total: 1,871.8 km^{2} (722.7 sq mi)

Population
  - Total: 39 (2021 census)
  - Density: 0.02084/km^{2} (0.0540/sq mi)
- Time zone: UTC+10:00 (AEST)
- Postcode: 4804
Suburbs around Springlands
Bogie	Bogie	Bogie
Mount Wyatt	Springlands	Bogie
Mount Wyatt	Newlands	Newlands

Springlands is a rural locality in the Whitsunday Region, Queensland, Australia. In the 2021 census, Springlands had a population of 39 people.

== Geography ==
The locality completely surrounds the localities of Collinsville and Scottville.

Springlands has the following mountains:

- Mount Bella Vista (20.5649°S 147.6767°E) 229 metres (751 ft)
- Mount Devlin (20.5214°S 147.8332°E) 487 metres (1,598 ft)
- Mount Jimmy (20.5730°S 147.6660°E) 168 metres (551 ft)
- Mount Toussaint (20.4955°S 147.8084°E) 449 metres (1,473 ft)
- Mount Vista (20.5951°S 147.9076°E) 476 metres (1,562 ft)
- Pine Mountain (20.4732°S 147.9101°E) 515 metres (1,690 ft)
- Sonoma Peak (20.5645°S 147.8970°E) 391 metres (1,283 ft)

The majority of the southern boundary is aligned with the Bowen River. Sonoma State Forest covers 8,800 hectares in the north-east of Springlands (20.4788°S 147.8976°E).

== Demographics ==
In the 2016 census, Springlands had a population of 45 people.

In the 2021 census, Springlands had a population of 39 people.

== Heritage listings ==
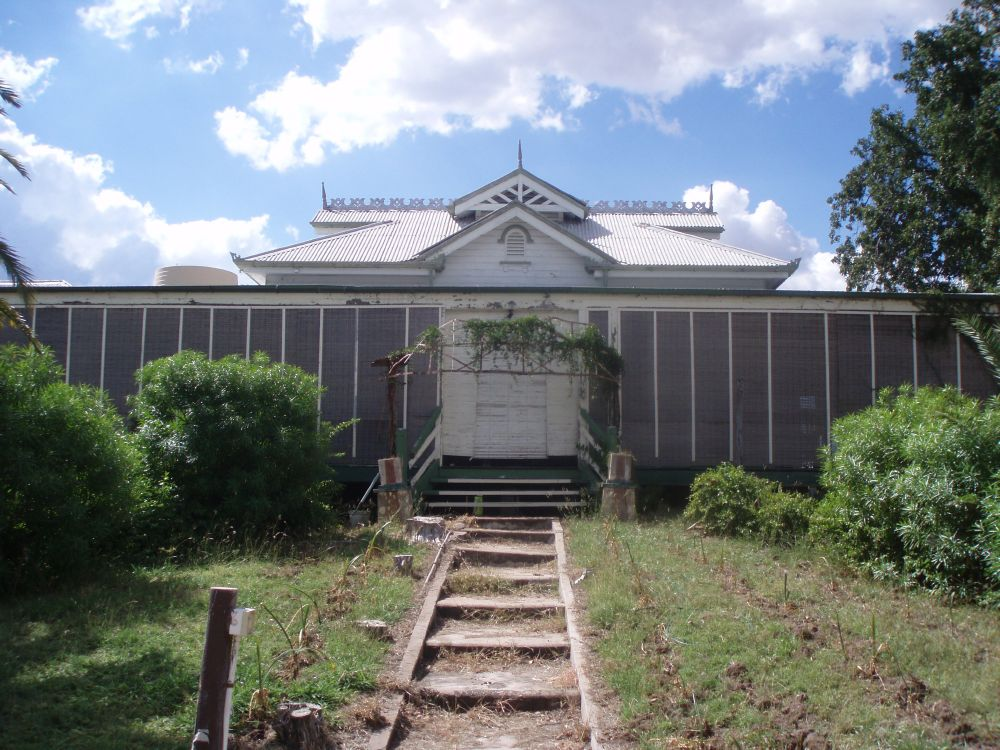
Strathmore Homestead, 2007

Springlands has a number of heritage-listed sites, including:

- Strathmore Homestead, Strathmore Road (20.4982°S 147.6299°E)

== Economy ==
The Collinsville coal mine is located in the locality (20.5651°S 147.7676°E) extending into neighbouring Collinsville.

There are four solar farms operated by Edify in Springlands:

- Daydream Solar Farm (20.4781°S 147.7652°E)
- Hayman Solar Farm (20.4814°S 147.7523°E)
- Whitsunday Solar Farm (20.4943°S 147.7479°E)
- Hamilton Solar Farm (20.5108°S 147.7559°E)

== Education ==
There are no schools in Springlands. The nearest government primary schools are in Collinsville State School in neighbouring Collinsville and Scotville State School in neighbouring Scotville. The nearest government secondary school is Collinsville State High School in Collinsville.
