= Bowen River Hotel =

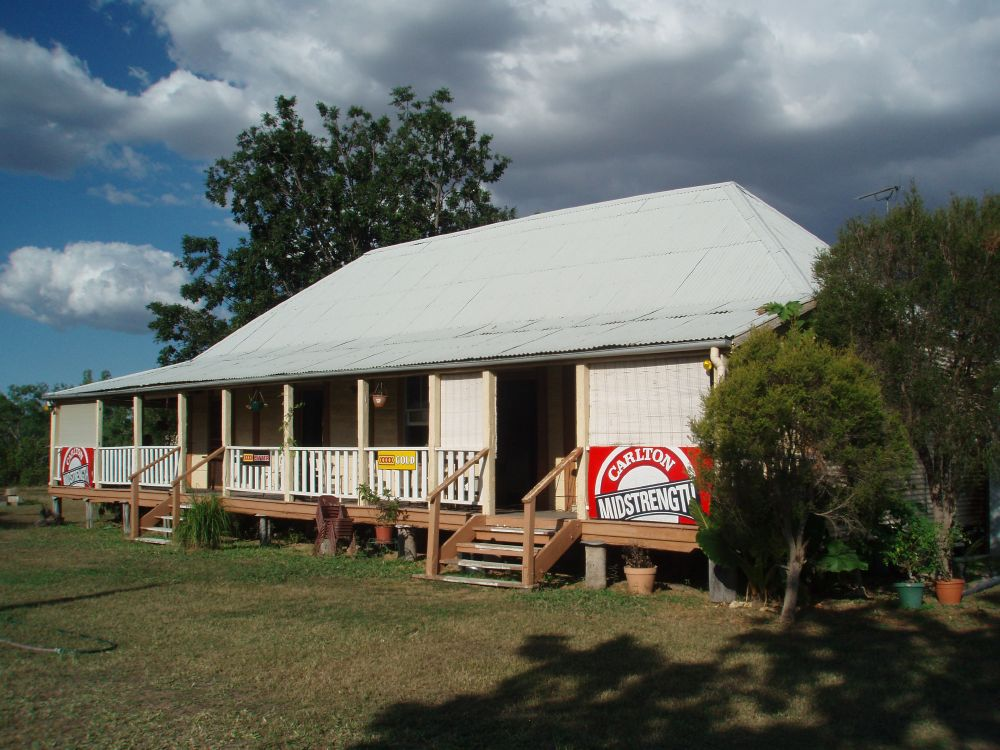
- Bowen River Hotel, 2007

- Location within Queensland Location within Australia
- 20.534°S 147.5562°E
- Location: Strathbowen-Leichhardt Range Road, Mount Wyatt, Whitsunday Region, Queensland, Australia

History
- Design period: 1840s–1860s (mid-19th century)
- Built: c. 1865

Queensland Heritage Register
- Official name: Bowen River Hotel, Heidelberg Inn
- Type: state heritage (built)
- Designated: 21 October 1992
- Reference no.: 600042
- Significant period: c. 1865 (fabric); 1974 (historical)
- Significant components: fence/wall – perimeter

Bowen River Hotel is a heritage-listed hotel on Strathbowen-Leichhardt Range Road, Mount Wyatt, Whitsunday Region, Queensland, Australia. It was built c. 1865. It is also known as Heidelberg Inn. It was added to the Queensland Heritage Register on 21 October 1992.

== History ==
Phillip Sommer and his partner John Harvey pioneered the area in 1862. They established a sheep and cattle run on Heidelberg, a selection of 95 square miles taken up by James Mead in 1861 but never stocked. Sommer had moved to Dotswood Station north of Charters Towers by 1866 and the Bowen River Hotel was operating from his Heidelberg homestead by 1865 with George Burnes as publican.

It was constructed on the supply route to Central Western Queensland which passed through the Kennedy District. Licensing information from the Port Denison Times indicates that it was probably one of two hotels built at much the same time in the same area. An inn called the Heidelberg was built at "the lower crossing place" while the Bowen River Hotel was constructed higher up on top of the steep bank of the Bowen River. The building was donated to the National Trust of Queensland in 1974 by Ted Cunningham of Strathmore Station and restoration of the rear wing was carried out by Mr George Stewart at that time. The structure was left exposed to vandals and campers for many years from the 1970s.

The building was renovated and reopened in 2003, and as of 2016 remains an operating hotel.

A book about the hotel, The Bowen River Saga: The Story of the Bowen River Hotel, was published by the Bowen Historical Society in 1973.

== Description ==
The Bowen River Hotel was built in the 1860s from local timber and originally roofed with bark. It comprises two buildings connected by a covered walkway, and is an example of careful bush carpentry and skilled jointing fixed with wooden pegs. The complex comprises two buildings connected by a covered walkway. A verandah extends round three sides of the main building, while a small verandah opens off the main room on the northern corner of the second and smaller structure.

Both buildings are raised on low stumps, some of which have ant caps, and flooring laid on a rough timber frame, rather than an earthen floor. It would appear to be an early example of this technique. Horizontal slabs of split timber have been used to construct the walls and the hipped roof and skillions over the verandahs are of corrugated iron.

A post and rail fence encloses what was once the front yard of the hotel. The building sits in a rural landscape with white cedar and Burdekin plum trees near the house and oleanders along the front fence.

== Heritage listing ==
Bowen River Hotel was listed on the Queensland Heritage Register on 21 October 1992 having satisfied the following criteria.

The place is important in demonstrating the evolution or pattern of Queensland's history.

Its significance is enhanced because of its connection with the pastoral development of the Kennedy Region and Central Western Queensland.

The place demonstrates rare, uncommon or endangered aspects of Queensland's cultural heritage.

The building is one of very few surviving country hotels constructed using bush carpentry techniques.

The place is important in demonstrating the principal characteristics of a particular class of cultural places.

The Bowen River Hotel is representative of a transitional type of timber construction which led to the development of a distinctive style of architecture in Queensland.

The place is important in demonstrating a high degree of creative or technical achievement at a particular period.

The building is one of very few surviving country hotels constructed using bush carpentry techniques.
