= Scottville, Queensland =

Scottville
- Town
- Interactive map of Scottville
- Coordinates: 20.5716°S 147.8194°E
- Country: Australia
- State: Queensland
- LGA: Whitsunday Region
- Location: 92.1 km (57.2 mi) SW of Bowen; 153 km (95 mi) W of Proserpine; 239 km (149 mi) NW of Mackay; 280 km (170 mi) SSE of Townsville; 1,146 km (712 mi) NNW of Brisbane

Government
  - State electorate: Burdekin
  - Federal division: Capricornia

Area
  - Total: 15.8 km^{2} (6.1 sq mi)

Population
  - Total: 279 (2021 census)
  - Density: 17.66/km^{2} (45.73/sq mi)
- Time zone: UTC+10:00 (AEST)
- Postcode: 4804
Localities around Scottville
Collinsville	Collinsville	Collinsville
Springlands	Scottville	Springlands
Springlands	Springlands	Springlands

Scottville is a rural town and locality in the Whitsunday Region, Queensland, Australia. In the 2021 census, the locality of Scottville had a population of 279 people.

== Geography ==
Scottville is in the Bowen Basin coal-mining area. It is located 4 kilometres (2.5 mi) south of the larger town of Collinsville. Scottville is located in the Whitsunday local government area, the administrative headquarters of which are located in Proserpine, 89 kilometres (55 mi) to the east.

== History ==
Bowen Consolidated Coal Mines Limited developed its own company township 4 kilometres (2.5 mi) south of Collinsville. It was originally to be named Scottdale (or possibly Scotsdale) after two of the directors, Adam Hall Scott and John Dinsdale, but the name was changed to Scottville after objections from the postal authorities.

Scottdale Provisional School opened on 28 January 1924 under headteacher Albert Czislowski operating from temporary premises with an iron roof and bag sides. By June 1924, there were 35 students enrolled. In August 1924, the Queensland Government announced it would construct a permanent school building at a cost of £744. The school was renamed Scottville Provisional School in September 1924 and then proclaimed as Scottville State School on 27 February 1925.

The Scottville sports ground opened on Tuesday 3 June 1924, with people travelling by bus from Collinsville to participate in the opening sports events including kicking and throwing balls, wood chopping, wheelbarrow racing, ladies nail driving, and 5-a-side soccer.

== Demographics ==
In the 2011 census, the locality of Scottville had a population of 344 people.

In the 2016 census, the locality of Scottville had a population of 259 people.

In the 2021 census, the locality of Scottville had a population of 279 people.

== Heritage listings ==
Scottville has a number of heritage-listed sites, including:

- Station Street and Second Avenue: Bowen Consolidated Colliery

== Education ==
Scottville State School is a government primary (Prep-6) school for boys and girls at 21 Eleventh Avenue (20.5741°S 147.8197°E). In 2014, it had an enrolment of 59 students with 4 teachers. In 2018, the school had an enrolment of 45 students with 3 teachers and 4 non-teaching staff (3 full-time equivalent).

The nearest government secondary school is Collinsville State High School in neighbouring Collinsville to the north-east.
