= Collinsville coal mine =

Mine in Queensland, Australia

Coordinates: 20°33′57″S 147°44′47″E

Collinsville Coal Mine
- Interactive map of Collinsville Coal Mine
- Location: Springlands, Collinsville, Queensland, Australia
- Products: Coking coal
- Opened: 1919
- Company: Xstrata, Itochu, Sumitomo Group

The Collinsville Coal Mine is a coal mine located in Springlands and Collinsville in the Whitsunday Region, Queensland, Australia. The open-cut mine lies in the northern Bowen Basin. Collinsville produces coking and steaming coal for both domestic use and export. Exports leave the country via Abbot Point.

The mine has coal reserves amounting to 196 million tonnes of coking coal, one of the largest coal reserves in Asia and the world. Collinsville has an annual production capacity of 6 million tonnes of coal.

== History ==
Mining began at the site in 1919. Because it is close to the Port of Townsville where American coal-fired warships were based during World War II, men were requisition to the mine.

On 1 May 1952, 150 miners took part in Queensland's first stay down strike. The men stayed in the underground mine to protest the lack of payment for a days work. The miners were unable to enter the mine on 15 April due to a lack of winchman.

In 1954, seven miners lives were lost at the mine in the Collinsville coal mine disaster. A mining heritage centre was opened 50 years later to commemorate the disaster.

Mount Isa Mines (MIM) gained a controlling interest in 1972. In 2003, MIM was purchased by Xstrata. Management of the mine was continued by Thiess until early 2013.

In July 2013, more than 300 workers were dismissed in an effort to return the mine to profitability.

== See also ==
- Coal in Australia
- List of mines in Australia
