= Bowen Consolidated Colliery =

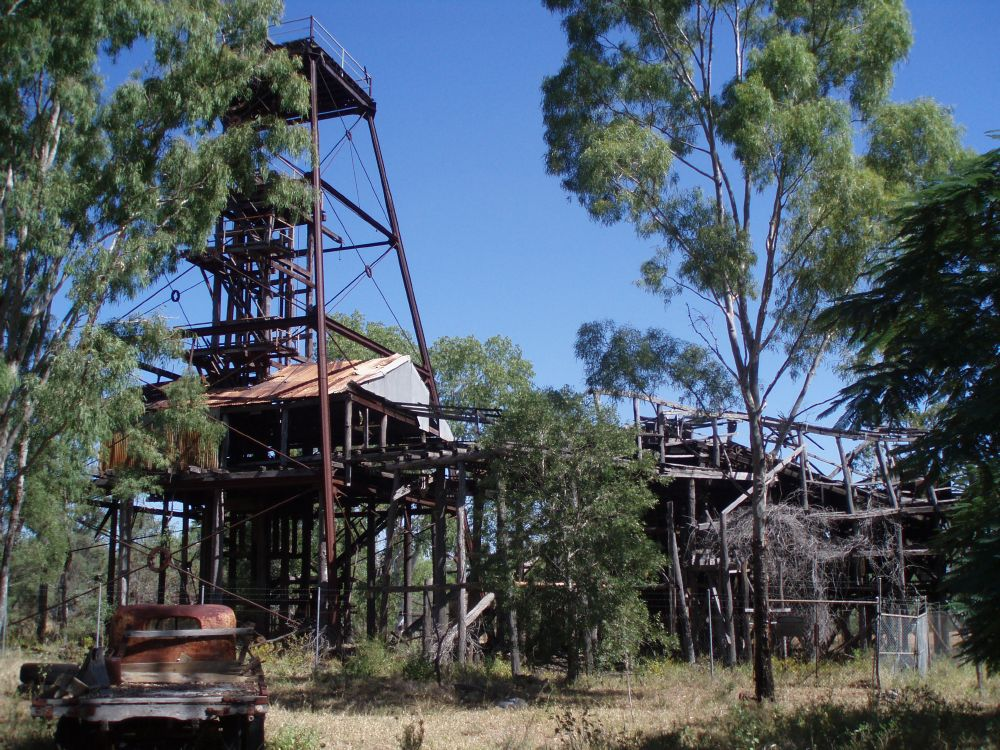
- Bowen Consolidated Colliery

- Location within Queensland Location within Australia
- 20.572°S 147.8124°E
- Location: Station Street and Second Avenue, Scottville, Whitsunday Region, Queensland, Australia

History
- Design period: 1919 - 1930s (interwar period)
- Built: 1919 -

Queensland Heritage Register
- Official name: Bowen Consolidated Colliery, No. 1 Underground Mine; Bowen Consolidated Coal Company Colliery
- Type: state heritage (built)
- Designated: 3 December 2009
- Reference no.: 601850
- Significant period: 1919-

Bowen Consolidated Colliery is a heritage-listed former mine at Station Street and Second Avenue, Scottville, Whitsunday Region, Queensland, Australia. It was established in 1919. It is also known as No. 1 Underground Mine and Bowen Consolidated Coal Company Colliery. It was added to the Queensland Heritage Register on 3 December 2009.

== History ==
The Bowen Consolidated Colliery (established in 1919) is a former underground mine at Scottville near Collinsville in North Queensland. The No. 1 Underground Mine at the Bowen Consolidated Colliery continued production until the end of 1962 by which time it had been superseded by the nearby fully mechanised No. 2 Underground Mine. The colliery is one of the earliest and most intact former coal mines in the Bowen Basin.

The Bowen Basin covers an area about 600 kilometres (370 mi) long and 250 kilometres (160 mi) wide extending from Collinsville in the north to south of Moura in Central Queensland. It contains about 70% of Queensland's coal. These are deposits of the Permian age and are the most important commercial deposits in the State, producing almost 100% of the State's coking coal and 60% of its thermal coal. In 2006–7, the State's top ten collieries for production were located in the Bowen Basin.

Commercial exploitation of Bowen Basin coal began at Blair Athol in the 1890s. At the time, the main coal producing area was the West Moreton coalfields. Some coal was also produced at the Burrum coalfields and on the Darling Downs. These mines supplied mostly thermal (steaming) coal to a domestic market; the Railway Department was a major customer. The success of mines depended on whether the coal was suitable for firing boilers and on their proximity to a railway line. Most early mines in the Bowen Basin struggled to remain commercially viable.

Intensive exploration of the Bowen Basin coalfield began only after the crisis in the base metals industry due to falling prices from 1907. Tests on the Bowen River Coal Company's lease in 1912 and 1913 sparked a rush to the field. Five syndicates had registered 17 leases straddling the Bowen outcrops by the end of 1915. However, the election of Queensland's first stable Labor government led in August 1915 to Cabinet refusing the private applications and reserving the 6.4 square kilometre area involved for State operations.

Competition for leases subsided into a long wait for railway construction to be completed. Construction of the 789 kilometres (490 mi) of railway took five years and the delay had exhausted most of the speculators long before the line opened in 1922. At the same time, by the end of 1919, a further nineteen leases had been forfeited to the State for non-payment of rent, and the surviving syndicates had amalgamated to form the Bowen Consolidated Coal Mining Company.

When the shares in the Company were released onto the market they failed to attract as much interest as had been anticipated, likely due to the rail link being some years away. So the Company only committed to a drilling programme at the time of the share release. However, by the end of 1919 John McNaughton was appointed manager and work began in earnest. A site for the mine was chosen and two parallel tunnels driven into the Garrick Seam. This activity generated cash which enabled a shaft to be sunk into the Bowen Seam in 1920.

In 1921, two vertical shafts were commenced, a winding shaft 4.3 by 1.8 metres (14.1 by 5.9 ft) to a depth of 11 metres (36 ft) and an upcast shaft 3.7 by 2.1 metres (12.1 by 6.9 ft) to a depth of 109 metres (358 ft). They were secured with a masonry collar and mounted with heavy headframe timbers set on the surface. A dam extending 53 metres (174 ft) was constructed for the mine water supply. A gantry and a permanent staging for landing skips were completed. By the end of 1921 a boiler, steam winch and saw bench with steam engine, buildings and explosives magazine were constructed.

The rail line connecting the terminus of the Government line to Bowen Consolidated was completed on 3 March 1923 and covered a distance of 4 miles 10 chains (6.6 km) and included 75 chains (5,000 ft; 1,500 m) of siding. The debt for the project was £31551/11/1. Coal output for the year to 31 May 1923 was 4,136 long tons (4,202 t) and a market had been located for all.

By the time the railway connection was finished in 1923, 26 miners and a similar number of surface men were at work at the Bowen Consolidated Coal Mine and output was averaging 35 long tons (36 t) of coal per day. Twin tramways were laid down the tunnels and serviced by a stationary steam hauling engine, a compressed air water pump was installed at the foot of the tunnel and the ventilation was improved by sinking a vertical shaft to an extension of one of the cross-cuts and equipping it with a double-inlet sirocco-type fan. Screens were installed on the loading gantry and the Cornish boilers supplied steam to the whole mine. An office building and bath-house were erected and by 1925 the main tunnel in the Garrick seam was 480 metres (1,570 ft) long and under 60 metres (200 ft) of cover. Coal output was 120 long tons (120 t) per day.

The steel headframe, 24 metres (79 ft) in height and with twin pulleys 3 metres (9.8 ft) in diameter, was purchased second-hand in Charters Towers as was the horizontal twin-cylinder winding engine built by Walkers Limited of Maryborough. The headframe and winding engine were installed on site in c. 1925.

Extant examples of this type of headframe are now uncommon. This type of headframe, where the weight is evenly balanced on all four legs is an old pattern that was superseded by the American A-frame construction in the interwar period. Only two other examples of this type of headframe are known to exist. These are at the Vulcan tin mine in the Mareeba mining district and the Dobbyn copper mine in the Mount Isa mining district. Both are three tier headframes; the headframe at the Bowen Consolidated Mine has four tiers.

By 1926, when production in the tunnels of the Garrick seam was halted by a fault, a ventilation shaft had been completed to the Bowen seam, and a brace had been constructed and connected to the loading gantry ready for switching to the better coal.

Bowen Consolidated Coal Mines Limited developed its own township 4 kilometres (2.5 mi) from Collinsville and the State Colliery and named it Scotsdale as a tribute to two of the directors of the old Bowen Coal and Coke Company Limited, Adam Hall Scott and John Dinsdale, but the name was changed to Scottville after objections from the postal department. Scottville grew at a slower pace than Collinsville because the mine which supported it was smaller and lacked government funding. Most of the dwellings were constructed from galvanised iron with the manager's house being the only substantial structure for many years. Only 17 miners' homestead perpetual leases had been taken up by the end of 1925 despite the fact that the population was approaching 300. The nearby town of Collinsville at this time had a population of around 800 and comprised a school, shops, police station, hotel, picture theatre, dance hall, bowling green and the early construction of a hospital.

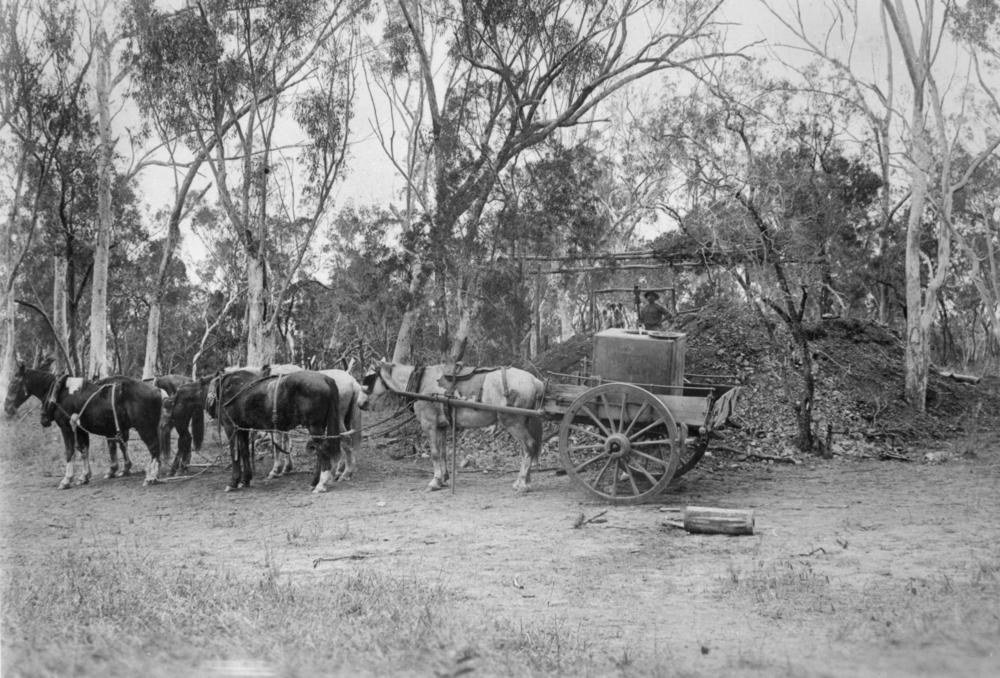
Dray and horses at Bowen Consolidated Coal Mines, circa 1918

In 1927 Bowen Consolidated Colliery employed 54 men and had seven horses working with the underground teams. By this time the underground section of the mine had electric lighting as did all surface buildings and a new Ingersoll Rand Compressor, to work the dip pump and the jack hammer machines, had been purchased to replace the old second-hand one.

A battery of new Babcock and Wilcox boilers was installed at Bowen Consolidated Colliery in 1929. The coal was railed to Bowen and after 1930 turned into coke for use in the Mount Isa Mine copper smelters. In 1930, a steam winch with coupled cylinders was in process of being installed underground for main and tail haulage. Two Babcock and Wilcox boilers and a new chimney of 24.7 metres (81 ft) in height with a diameter of 1.3 metres (4 ft 3 in) were also erected in that year. At this time both Scottville and Collinsville (servicing the State Coal Mine a few kilometres away) were "thriving centres of population".

Through the 1930s and 1940s the mine continued to be productive and by 1943 the entire output from the mine was being supplied to the railways. In 1946 two additional Babcock & Wilcox boilers were installed with a shed erected over them. The 1947 Bowen Harbour Board Annual Report noted that an "electric generating set" was installed during that year; this may have been the extant power house.

By 1956 Bowen Consolidated Coal Mines Ltd was a subsidiary of Mount Isa Mines Ltd (MIM). Plans were made to sink a new shaft at the mine in order to meet expansion demands. Aerial photography was to be used to accurately map the area. Profit for the mine rose from £26,490 in 1955 to £103,667 in 1956.

In 1962, Bowen Consolidated Coal Mines made a new entry into the Bowen seam which would be known as Bowen Consolidated Coal No. 2 Mine. Production in the fully mechanised No. 2 mine commenced in September of that year (Bowen Independent 1962). The No. 1 Underground Mine at Bowen Consolidated Colliery continued production until late 1962.

By this time, commercial exploitation of coking coal in the Bowen Basin for the export market was commencing on a massive scale to supply the booming Japanese steel industry. International consortiums and mining companies introduced open cut mining methods using huge mining plant including some of the biggest draglines in the world. This revolutionised mining techniques in Queensland; small scale underground mines were largely superseded and the nature of coal mining in Queensland was completely transformed.

By 1980 MIM's subsidiary, Collinsville Coal Company had absorbed Bowen Consolidated Coal Mines Ltd. Part of the disused complex was fenced off by the 1980s.

The former colliery is probably the most intact of its era and type in Queensland. It is one of only two relatively intact former mines known to be extant from the first phase of coalmining in the Bowen Basin. The other is the former Dawson Valley Colliery. The Bowen colliery is recognised in the industry for its historical importance and by an industry expert, Professor Ray Whitmore, as containing "the finest relics of coal mining in the 1920s anywhere in Queensland".

== Description ==
Bowen Consolidated Colliery is located on the edge of the township of Scottville, approximately 3.5 kilometres (2.2 mi) south-west of Collinsville, and 75 kilometres (47 mi) south-west of Bowen. The large, former colliery covers an area of approximately 5 hectares (12 acres). The major structures include the headframe and gantry, Number One shaft winding house, boiler house, Number Two shaft fan house, powerhouse, bathhouse, mine office, workshop, Garrick Shaft Fan House, sawmill, detonator magazine, lamp shed, water tanks, and single men's quarters. Remains of railway and tramline formations still remain. The remains of other structures include the workshop and stores site, Number Two shaft winding engine, lime store, cement shed, ramps, early bathhouse and fitting shop. Part of the site is surrounded by a recent wire security fence including the headframe, Number One winding house, boiler house and power house. Much of the site is overgrown with grasses, trees and other vegetation.

=== Headframe and Gantry ===
The tapered steel-framed, four-legged headframe is the tallest structure on the site, sitting on foundations about 15 metres (49 ft) square in plan. The legs each comprise steel tubing formed from four, quarter cylinder sections rivetted together. The legs are connected with four levels of horizontal steel I-beams with diagonal cross bracing of rods at each level. The assembly of bracing and cross members is rivetted together. A timber platform at the top level is surrounded by a steel railing.

The remains of the lift structure are extant within the headframe. It has the appearance of an open, narrow timber-framed tower rising to the third tier of the headframe at the top of which is a timber platform surrounded by a steel railing. On at least three levels, small timber platforms with steel railings project from the side. All platforms are connected by timber ladders with an additional ladder connecting the top of the lift structure with the top of the headframe itself.

At the lowest tier, and contained within the legs of the headframe, a structure with a corrugated iron gabled roof is located on the timber platform. This structure has open sides except for a small section of wall enclosed with corrugated iron.

Extending to the north from the side of the headframe at the level of the first tier is the partially collapsed gantry. This is an open sided timber structure with a timber deck on top and some extra decking at mid height. The structure contains the remains of a weighbridge and associated weighbridge office. It also contains the remains of at least one coal chute.

A Ruston Hornsby Grantham England two-cylinder steam winding engine is situated immediately adjacent to the west of the headframe. It is mounted on a concrete slab and has two exposed gear wheels and two cable drums with steel cable extant on the larger drum.

=== Number One Shaft Winding House ===
This is located approximately 12 metres (39 ft) south-west of the headframe. The building is about 8 by 11 metres (26 by 36 ft) in plan. It is a high-set, timber-framed structure with corrugated iron walls and a corrugated iron gabled roof. A curved ridge vent runs the length of the roof. The walls extend to the ground, enclosing the under floor area. There are openings where some sheets of iron are missing from the walls.

The entrance to the building is via the north-east elevation facing the headframe. A timber stair running along the side of the building leads to a landing and the door opening. To the right of the door is a large opening through which can be seen two large cable drums with extant steel cable. The plant located within the winding house includes a two-cylinder steam winding engine (Walkers Limited No. 847 1903).

=== Boiler House ===
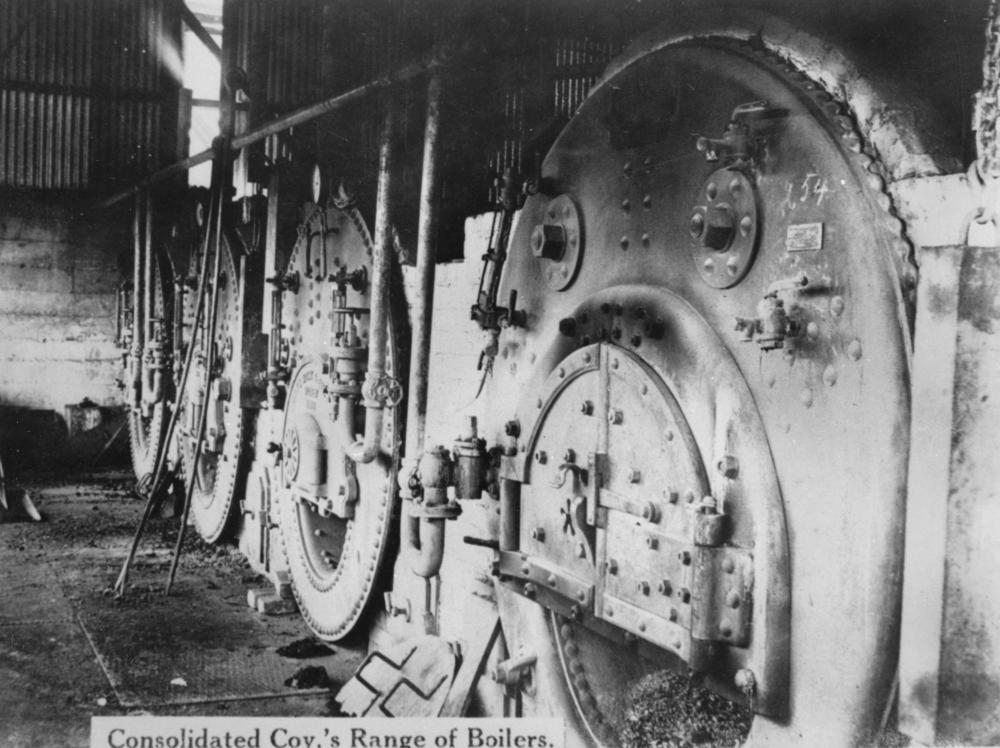
Boilers at Bowen Consolidated Coal Mines, circa 1920

Six boilers are extant at the site of the former boiler house approximately 28 metres (92 ft) west of the headframe. These consist of two sets of Babcock and Wilcox water tube boilers and chain grate stokers (a set of two and a set of four). Each set comprises a rectangular enclosure made of refractory bricks standing between 3 and 4 metres (9.8 and 13.1 ft) high. Riveted, steel steam drums are seated on the tops of the enclosures. They are held in place at intervals along the structure by steel girders that run up the sides and across the top. Large square, steel-framed openings at one end of the enclosure expose the ends of the sets of water tubes that run the length of the interior of the structure. A set of tubes is missing from the larger set of boilers, leaving a cavity. Underneath these openings are the arched brick openings of the furnaces.

Immediately to the north and south of the boilers are low brick structures, approximately 1 metre (3 ft 3 in) in height. These comprise the remains of a coal bin, (north) and the condensers and brick flue associated with the boilers (south).

=== Number Two Shaft and Fan House ===
The Number Two shaft and fan house are situated approximately 50 metres (160 ft) south-west of the headframe. The fan house, immediately south of the remains of the shaft, is a multi-compartment structure.

The eastern part of the structure is constructed of concrete blocks and has a gable roof with a timber frame and corrugated iron cladding. One end is open and the other has a large square opening. Two windows along the eastern side have timber frames and are covered with corrugated iron. There is a single, similar window on the western side. There is no ceiling in this part of the structure.

The rest of the fan house adjoins the western side of the gable-roofed building. This is a flat-roofed structure made of red and brown bricks. A single door opens into a small porch that projects from the front. A short brick tower about 3 metres (9.8 ft) high and 3 metres (9.8 ft) on each side projects from the roof close to the gable-roofed section.

=== Power House ===
The power house is located approximately 10 metres (33 ft) to the west of the boilers. The tall core of the timber-framed, gabled building with corrugated iron walls and roofing is about 22 metres (72 ft) long and 9 metres (30 ft) wide. Two skillion-roofed sections are attached to part of its northern and southern elevations. A steel flue projects from the roof. The plant inside the power house includes two British Thompson Houston Rugby generators, and three Bellis and Morcom diesel engines.

=== Bathhouses ===
The extant bathhouse is located approximately 90 metres (300 ft) to the south of the headframe. It is a lowset, rendered cavity brick structure with a corrugated iron gabled roof and small, high level, rectangular windows. It consists of two wings, one about 27 metres (89 ft) long running north- east to south-west and another extending about 11 metres (36 ft) from the middle of the south-eastern elevation. Entrance is gained via a double timber door opening in the middle of the northern elevation.

The interior has a concrete floor, white rendered walls and no ceiling. It contains a large common changing room and common shower area. The entrance opens into the changing area. This area has a row of timber pegs along each wall at a height of about 2.5 metres (8 ft 2 in). An open drain runs along the centre of the floor in the shower area; there are no cubicles. Two lengths of square section steel channelling are suspended from the roof about 2 metres (6 ft 7 in) above the floor.

The foundations of the first bathhouse, consisting of a concrete surface, are located approximately 18 metres (59 ft) north-west of the extant bathhouse. A small corrugated iron bathhouse is situated adjacent to the north of the boiler house.

=== Lamp shed ===
The lamp shed is located about 5 metres (16 ft) east of the bathhouse. It is a small, timber-framed building, about 6 metres (20 ft) square in plan, with a gabled roof. The walls are clad with ripple iron sheeting and the roof and gables are clad with corrugated iron sheeting. There are timber-framed window openings and a single timber door.

=== Mine Manager's Residence and Office ===
The mine manager's residence and office is situated approximately 125 metres (410 ft) east of the headframe. It is a single storey timber house, about 16 metres (52 ft) square in plan, raised on short stumps with a hipped roof clad in corrugated iron sheeting. The space between the stumps is in-filled with timber battens.

The main entrance is via the north-western elevation. A stair, running parallel to the elevation, rises to a timber landing covered by a corrugated iron skillion roof. A single timber door opens to the interior from the landing. The elevation consists of a front verandah that has been enclosed with sheeting. Two windows to the left of the entrance are aluminium-framed sliding windows; on the right, there are eight sets of louvres. The window hoods consist of flat metal sheeting.

The south-western elevation is clad with corrugated iron except for sections at the front and rear that are clad with flat sheeting. There are sets of louvres towards the front of the elevation and a timber- framed sash window at about the midpoint. Two sets of louvres at the very front are covered with sheeting. A section towards the rear of the elevation is recessed by about 4 metres (13 ft); a timber-framed sash window is located at the midpoint of this section.

=== Workshop and Stores ===
The workshop and stores area is located approximately 25 metres (82 ft) east of the headframe, between the headframe and the mine office.

To the east of this area is a corrugated iron shed about 32 metres (105 ft) long and 25 metres (82 ft) wide with a steel frame and trusses, a concrete floor, and a high gabled roof. The side elevations consist of rendered brick or concrete walls to a height of about 1 metre (3 ft 3 in), with corrugated iron cladding above this. Three corrugated iron, sliding doors, the largest in the centre, provide access through the front of the shed. There is a large square window opening above the central door and windows to the left of it, shaded by a flat metal hood. A series of steel-framed windows along the sides are each divided into 12 panels.

Adjacent to the west of the workshop are the remains of a number of structures including blacksmith's shop, carpenter's shop, points shed, brattice shed, store, a timber rack and an iron rack.

=== Garrick Shaft Fan House ===
The fan house is located approximately 115 metres (377 ft) south of the headframe. It is a partly demolished brick structure with a flat concrete roof. A brick tower, about 3 metres (9.8 ft) square and about 3 metres (9.8 ft) high, projects from the roof in the middle of the structure. Two courses of projecting bricks surround the tower a short distance from the top.

=== Sawmill ===
The sawmill is situated approximately 95 metres (312 ft) south-south-east of the headframe. It is an open timber-framed structure with a corrugated iron roof. Evidence of a tramline running from the sawmill directly towards the headframe is still visible. A small section of tramline and tram trolley remains inside the sawmill.

=== Railway and Tramway ===
Railway siding formation still exists although the tracks have been removed. The siding runs in a generally east–west direction across the site, both under and adjacent to the gantry. The remains of a separate network of tramlines through the site also remain although the track, itself, has been removed. The tramline remains connect the Number One shaft under the headframe with the workshops and stores site, boiler house, and sawmill.

=== Additional structures and evidence ===
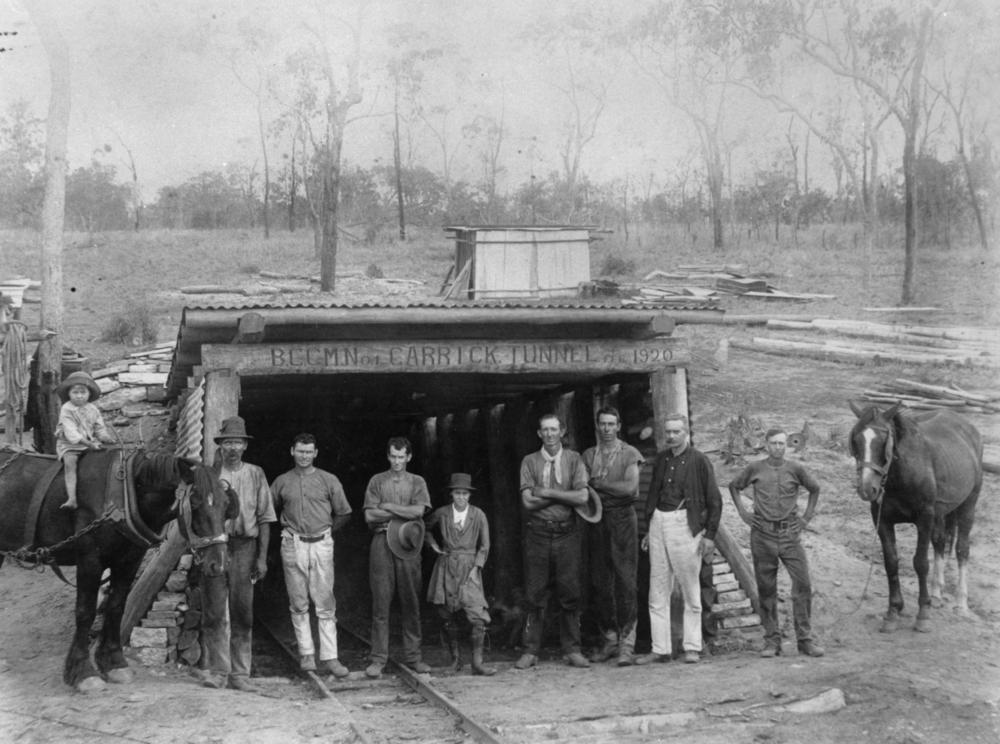
Miners outside the Garrick Tunnel, circa 1920

A partly demolished detonator magazine, about 2.5 metres (8 ft 2 in) square in plan, is situated approximately 58 metres (190 ft) south-west of the extant bathhouse. A corrugated iron water tank is situated approximately 10 metres (33 ft) to the west of the Number Two Shaft Fan House. A group of three buildings designated as single men's quarters are situated approximately 30 metres (98 ft) south-east of the mine office.

Other remains on site include the entrances to the Number One and Number Two Garrick tunnels and adjacent office, the Number Two shaft winding engine mount, water tanks, lime store, cement shed, machine and coal loading ramps, boiler ash dump, brickworks and drain. Other artefacts remain in surface and subsurface deposits across the entire site.

== Heritage listing ==
Bowen Consolidated Colliery was listed on the Queensland Heritage Register on 3 December 2009 having satisfied the following criteria.

The place is important in demonstrating the evolution or pattern of Queensland's history.

As one of Queensland's most intact former coal mines of its type and era, Bowen Consolidated Colliery (1919) is important in demonstrating the evolution of Queensland's coal mining history. As one of the first successful mines in the Bowen Basin, it provides important evidence of the beginning of commercial coal mining in the State's largest and most productive coal field.

The mine is also important in demonstrating the development of coal mining techniques in Queensland. It is typical, in scale and type, of mines prior to the late 1950s. Underground mines like the Bowen Consolidated Colliery became less common during the 1960s following the introduction of large-scale open cut methods.

The place demonstrates rare, uncommon or endangered aspects of Queensland's cultural heritage.

The Bowen Consolidated Colliery is one of only two relatively intact former mines known to be extant from the first phase of coalmining in the Bowen Basin. The other is the former Dawson Valley Colliery. The Bowen colliery is uncommon for its relatively high level of intactness and as a collection of 1920s coal mining technology.

The headframe at the Bowen Consolidated Colliery is important as an uncommon example of its type. This type of headframe, where the weight is evenly balanced on all four legs is an old pattern that was superseded by the American A-frame construction in the interwar period.

The place has potential to yield information that will contribute to an understanding of Queensland's history.

The Bowen Consolidated Colliery has the potential to reveal information through archaeological techniques on important aspects of Queensland's history, including early underground coal mining, the evolving technology in the coal mining industry in Queensland, the working conditions of the mine workers, and the organisation of labour.

The Colliery complex has the potential to answer a range of other archaeological research questions including but not limited to the creation, selection, use and rejection of coal mining technologies, the ethnic and industrial background of mine workers and its influence on operations and organisation, and the impact of technologies and industries on the environment.

The place is important in demonstrating the principal characteristics of a particular class of cultural places.

Bowen Consolidated Colliery is important in demonstrating the principal characteristics of an early 20th century colliery. Most of the above ground structures associated with the mine remain extant and many are highly intact. Extant structures include: headframe and gantry, winding house and plant, boilers, fan houses, power house and plant, bathhouse, mine manager's residence and office, workshop, sawmill and other ancillary structures.
