= Bowen River (Queensland) =

Bowen
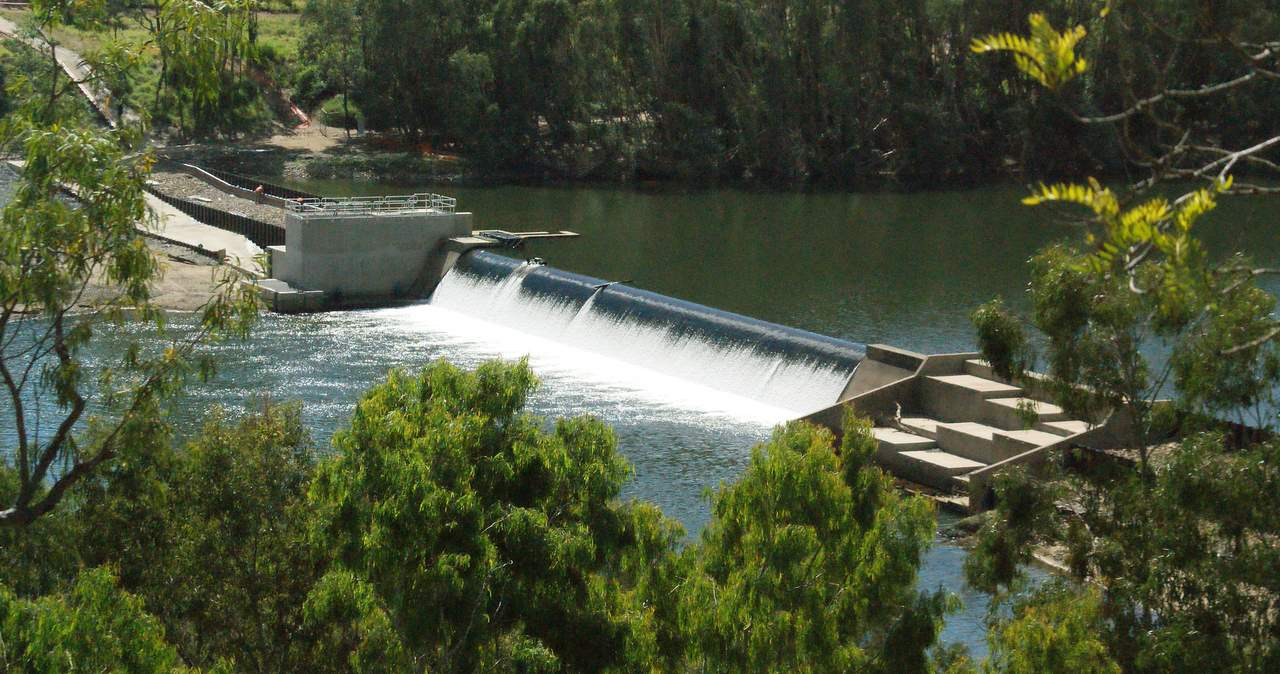
- Bowen River Weir, 2010

- Location of Bowen River mouth in Queensland
- Etymology: Sir George Bowen

Location
- Country: Australia
- State: Queensland
- Region: North Queensland

Physical characteristics
- Source: Normanby Range, Great Dividing Range
  - location: near Turrawulla
  - coordinates: 21°09′27″S 148°13′59″E
  - elevation: 260 m (850 ft)
- Source confluence: Broken River and Little Bowen River
  - coordinates: 20°48′39″S 148°05′00″E
  - elevation: 148 m (486 ft)
- Mouth: Burdekin River
  - location: south southeast of Ravenswood
  - coordinates: 20°23′40″S 147°20′55″E
  - elevation: 50 m (160 ft)
- Length: 129 km (80 mi)
- Basin size: 9,452 km^{2} (3,649 sq mi)

Basin features
- River system: Burdekin River
- Tributaries
  - left: Rosella Creek, Parrot Creek, Ten Mile Creek (Queensland), Oaky Creek (Queensland), Sandalwood Creek
  - right: Flagstaff Creek, Basin Creek, Jack Creek (Queensland), Twelve Mile Creek (Queensland), Pelican Creek (Queensland)

The Bowen River is a river in North Queensland, Australia.

== Course and features ==
Formed by the confluence of the Broken River and the Little Bowen River near Tent Hill in the Normanby Range, part of the Great Dividing Range, the Bowen River flows in a north-westerly direction along the base of the range then flows west across Emu Plains and is crossed by the Bowen Developmental Road just north of Havilah. The river then flows north-west again between the Herbert Range and Leichhardt Range then discharges into the Burdekin River, south southeast of Ravenswood. The river descends 98 metres (322 ft) over its 129-kilometre (80 mi) course.

The catchment area of the river occupies 9,452 square kilometres (3,649 sq mi) of which an area of 236 square kilometres (91 sq mi) is composed of riverine wetlands. The catchment is in poor condition with much of the riparian habitat having been cleared and prone to erosion. The area is mostly used for cattle grazing with the towns of Collinsville and Glendon both drawing their town water supply from the Bowen River Weir. The river has a mean annual discharge of 1,618 gigalitres (3.56×10^{11} imp gal; 4.27×10^{11} US gal).

The Bowen River Weir supplies water to a coal mine, power station and the township of Collinsville.

== History ==
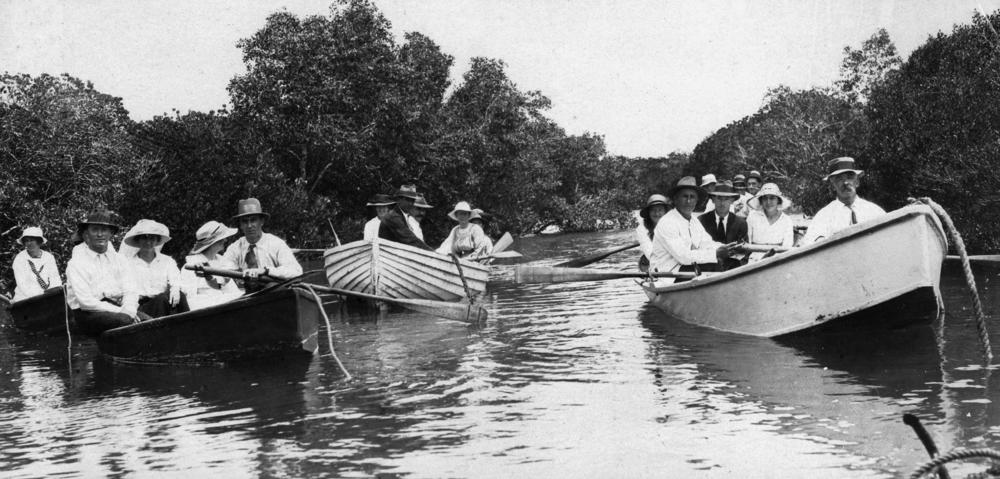
Bowen boating party, 1910s

The river was named in 1861 by the Queensland Government, derived from the name of the town Bowen which was named in honour of Sir George Bowen, a Governor of Queensland.

In the 1860s, Richard Daintree made mineral discoveries along the river. Daintree made the first systematic examination of the Bowen River coal seams near Collinsville.

Circa 1865, the Bowen River Hotel was built at the top of a steep bank of the river (20.534°S 147.5562°E). The hotel is now listed on the Queensland Heritage Register.

Construction of the Bowen River Weir commenced in April 1982 and was completed in August 1983. The A$6.5 million project is situated approximately 25 kilometres (16 mi) south of Collinsville and delivers water to the Newlands Coal Mine.

== See also ==
- List of rivers of Australia § Queensland
- Gattonvale Offstream Storage
