= Bowen Independent =

Australian newspaper

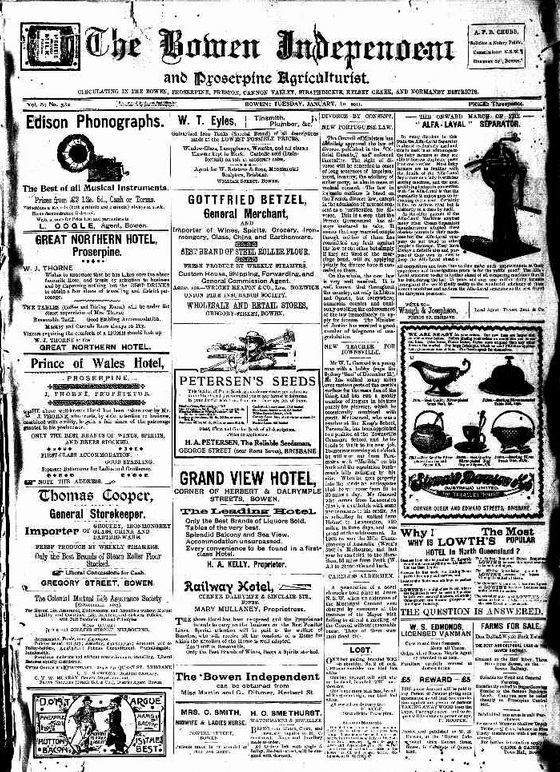
Front page of The Bowen Independent, 10 January 1911

The Bowen Independent is a newspaper published in Bowen, Queensland, Australia.

== History ==
The Bowen Independent started as the Bowen Record in 1902, before becoming the Bowen Independent and Proserpine Agriculturalist in 1903. In 1920 the paper incorporated the Bowen Chronicle and was renamed the Bowen Independent. The Bowen Independent also publishes a weekend counterpart called the Weekend Independent. The paper was bought by News Ltd via North Queensland Newspaper Co. in 1986. The Bowen Independent is still running today and serves the residents of Bowen shire, the Whitsundays and the Burdekin district.

Along with many other regional Australian newspapers owned by NewsCorp, the newspaper ceased print editions in June 2020 and became an online-only publication from 26 June 2020.

== Digitisation ==
The paper has been digitised as part of the Australian Newspapers Digitisation Program of the National Library of Australia.

== See also ==
- List of newspapers in Australia
