= Collinsville, Queensland =

Collinsville
- Town
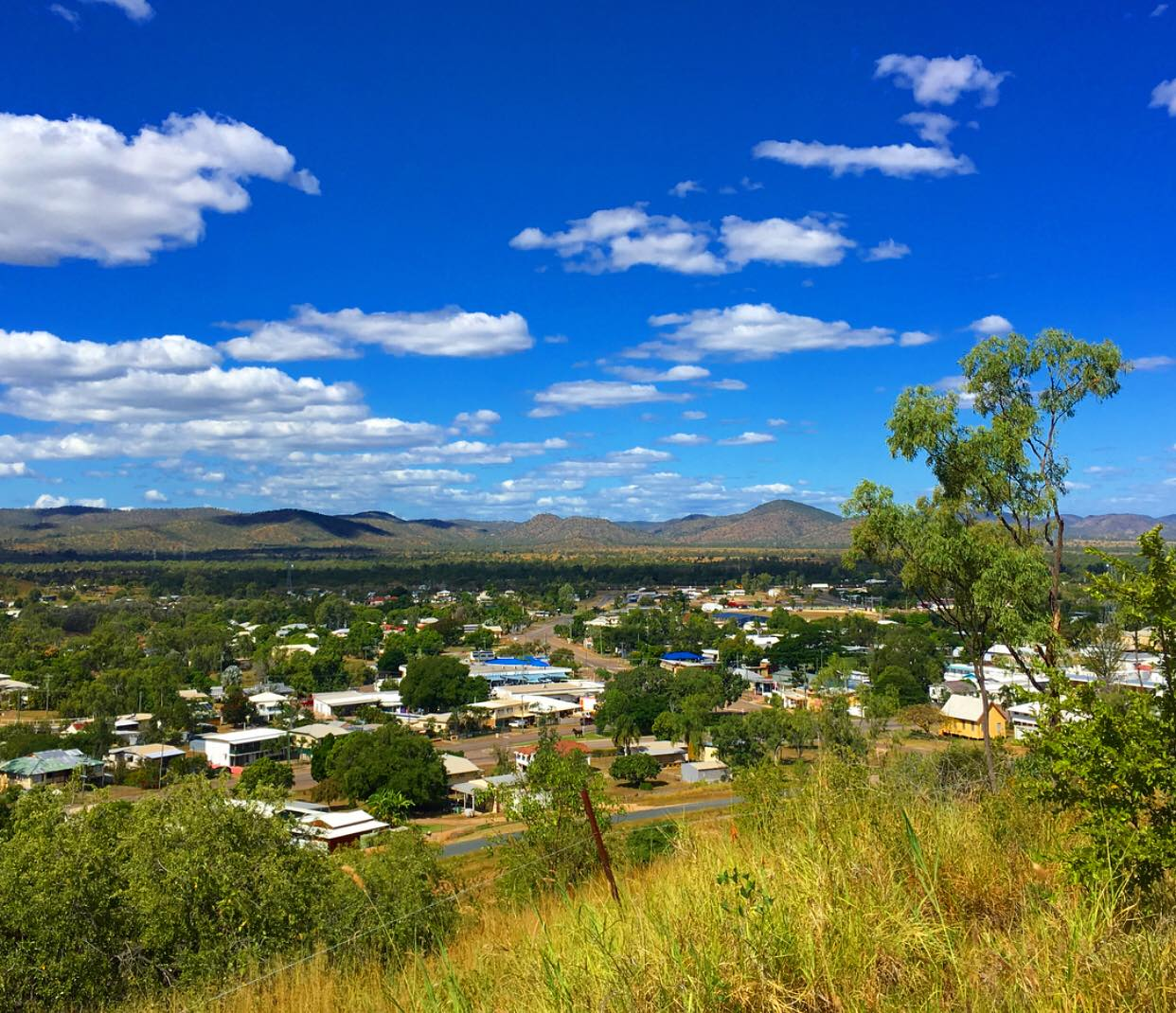
- Collinsville, May 2018

- Interactive map of Collinsville
- Coordinates: 20.5526°S 147.8452°E
- Country: Australia
- State: Queensland
- LGA: Whitsunday Region
- Location: 87.7 km (54.5 mi) SW of Bowen; 148 km (92 mi) W of Proserpine; 273 km (170 mi) NW of Mackay; 276 km (171 mi) SW of Townsville; 1,167 km (725 mi) NNW of Brisbane

Government
  - State electorate: Burdekin
  - Federal division: Capricornia

Area
  - Total: 27.9 km^{2} (10.8 sq mi)
- Elevation: 187 m (614 ft)

Population
  - Total: 1,496 (2021 census)
  - Density: 53.62/km^{2} (138.88/sq mi)
- Time zone: UTC+10:00 (AEST)
- Postcode: 4804
- Mean max temp: 30.2 °C (86.4 °F)
- Mean min temp: 16.4 °C (61.5 °F)
- Annual rainfall: 704.7 mm (27.74 in)
Localities around Collinsville
Springlands	Springlands	Springlands
Springlands	Collinsville	Springlands
Springlands	Scottville	Springlands

Collinsville is a mining town and rural locality in the Whitsunday Region, Queensland, Australia. In the 2021 census, the locality of Collinsville had a population of 1,496 people.

== Geography ==
Collinsville is in the coal-rich Bowen Basin region of Central Queensland, 1,245 kilometres (774 mi) north of Brisbane and 87 kilometres (54 mi) south-west of the coastal town of Bowen. The Bowen Developmental Road passes through the town connecting with Bowen to the north-east and the Gregory Highway at Belyando Crossing to the south-west.

The Newlands railway system passes through Collinsville serving local mines. The line passes through the town itself but the Collinsville railway station is only a siding near the junction of Station Street and Railway Road (20.5571°S 147.8516°E).

=== Climate ===
Climate data for Collinsville, Queensland (1991–2020 normals, extremes 1955–present)
Month	Jan	Feb	Mar	Apr	May	Jun	Jul	Aug	Sep	Oct	Nov	Dec	Year
Record high °C (°F)	44.0 (111.2)	43.3 (109.9)	40.7 (105.3)	36.9 (98.4)	34.7 (94.5)	32.8 (91.0)	32.0 (89.6)	34.2 (93.6)	36.6 (97.9)	39.9 (103.8)	41.9 (107.4)	42.2 (108.0)	44.0 (111.2)
Mean daily maximum °C (°F)	33.8 (92.8)	33.2 (91.8)	32.5 (90.5)	30.7 (87.3)	27.9 (82.2)	25.6 (78.1)	25.6 (78.1)	27.2 (81.0)	30.3 (86.5)	32.6 (90.7)	33.9 (93.0)	34.6 (94.3)	30.7 (87.3)
Daily mean °C (°F)	28.1 (82.6)	27.7 (81.9)	26.4 (79.5)	24.0 (75.2)	21.0 (69.8)	18.4 (65.1)	17.7 (63.9)	19.0 (66.2)	22.3 (72.1)	25.1 (77.2)	26.9 (80.4)	28.2 (82.8)	23.7 (74.7)
Mean daily minimum °C (°F)	22.3 (72.1)	22.3 (72.1)	20.3 (68.5)	17.4 (63.3)	14.0 (57.2)	11.2 (52.2)	9.7 (49.5)	10.9 (51.6)	14.2 (57.6)	17.7 (63.9)	20.0 (68.0)	21.8 (71.2)	16.8 (62.2)
Record low °C (°F)	15.0 (59.0)	15.6 (60.1)	10.2 (50.4)	6.6 (43.9)	1.7 (35.1)	−1.1 (30.0)	−1.0 (30.2)	−1.1 (30.0)	2.2 (36.0)	7.3 (45.1)	12.8 (55.0)	14.3 (57.7)	−1.1 (30.0)
Average precipitation mm (inches)	137.7 (5.42)	163.1 (6.42)	72.6 (2.86)	32.4 (1.28)	27.2 (1.07)	25.2 (0.99)	13.6 (0.54)	20.2 (0.80)	13.2 (0.52)	21.2 (0.83)	42.5 (1.67)	96.0 (3.78)	664.9 (26.18)
Average precipitation days (≥ 1.0 mm)	8.7	10.5	5.9	3.4	2.6	2.7	1.1	1.5	1.4	2.3	3.7	6.5	50.3
Average dew point °C (°F)	20.4 (68.7)	21.0 (69.8)	19.5 (67.1)	17.0 (62.6)	14.1 (57.4)	11.5 (52.7)	9.9 (49.8)	10.3 (50.5)	12.9 (55.2)	15.2 (59.4)	17.1 (62.8)	19.0 (66.2)	15.7 (60.3)
Source 1: National Oceanic and Atmospheric Administration
Source 2: Bureau of Meteorology

== History ==
Biri (Birri) is an Aboriginal language of Central Queensland and North Queensland. Biri refers to a language chain extending from Central Queensland towards Townsville and is often used as a universal name for other languages and/or dialects across the region. The language area includes the towns of Bowen, Ayr, Collinsville and Nebo.

European settlement of the region began in 1861 with the opening of the lands to pastoralists, with some cattle stations still in operation.

Coal was discovered in 1866 but it was not until 1912 that large-scale mining operations commenced.

The town was originally known as Moongunya, an aboriginal word that roughly translates to place of coal. On 20 September 1921 it was officially renamed Collinsville after Charles Collins who was the Labor Member of the Queensland Legislative Assembly for Bowen from 1915 to 1936.

Collinsville State School opened on 27 June 1921.

Collinsville Post Office opened on 21 May 1923 (a receiving office had been open from 1922).

The foundation stone of Our Lady of Lourdes Catholic Church was laid on Sunday 3 April 1927 by Reverend Father Eveney. On Sunday 17 July 1927 Bishop Joseph Shiel officially opened the church in the presence of many people, including almost 500 people who had travelled from Bowen on a special train arranged for the occasion accompanied by the Bowen Brass Band.

Methodist services were being held in Collinsville by the Methodist minister based in Bowen since at least 1935. In December 1946 tenders were called to erect a Methodist church in Sonoma Street. In 1947 the foundation stone for the Collinsville Methodist Church was laid. On 7 February 1948 the church was officially opened. When the Methodist Church amalgamated into the Uniting Church in Australia in 1977, it became the Collinsville Uniting Church.

The St John Bosco Catholic School was established in 1936 under the Sisters of Mercy. The school is named after Saint John Bosco, a Roman Catholic priest who devoted himself to the betterment of children through love and education.

On 13 October 1954, seven men were killed in the deepest part of the Collinsville State Coal Mine about 1.5 kilometres from the entrance of the No. 1 tunnel, when an outburst dislodged 900 tonnes of earth. The Collinsville mine disaster was the largest loss of life in a Queensland mine since the Mount Mulligan mine disaster in 1921.

Collinsville State High School opened on 28 January 1986.

== Demographics ==
In the 2011 census, the locality of Collinsville had a population of 1,501 people, which declined to 1,248 in the 2016 census, before rebounding to 1,496 in the 2021 census.

== Heritage listings ==
Collinsville has a number of heritage-listed sites, including:

- Collinsville Cemetery, Collinsville-Scottville Road
- Bowen River Hotel, Strathbowen-Leichhardt Range Road

== Economy ==
The town is home to a number of coal mines. This includes the Collinsville coal mine and the Sonoma Mine. These provide significant employment to the town and surrounding areas.

It is also hoped that a new connecting road, leading to Proserpine, will be built. This will enable faster travel between the town and the coastal plain, and will also open up new opportunities for land development and export.

== Amenities ==
The Whitsunday Regional Council operates the Collinsville Library, located on 37 Conway Street, Collinsville. It was opened in 1982.

The Collinsville branch of the Queensland Country Women's Association meets at 33 Conway Street.

There are four churches: Catholic, Anglican, Uniting, and Assembly of God. Our Lady of Lourdes Catholic Church is at 28 Stanley Street (20.5542°S 147.8452°E). Collinsville Uniting Church is at 33 Sonoma Street (corner of Conway Street, 20.5529°S 147.8428°E).

Sporting facilities include a golf course, rugby league grounds, tennis courts, a public swimming pool, squash courts, and lawn bowls.

== Education ==
Collinsville State School is a government primary (Prep-6) school for boys and girls on Devlin Street (20.5483°S 147.8456°E). In 2014, the school had an enrolment of 42 students with 4 teachers. In 2018, the school had an enrolment of 54 students with 5 teachers and 9 non-teaching staff (5 full-time equivalent).

St John Bosco Catholic School is a Catholic primary (Prep-6) school for boys and girls at 25 Blake Street (20.5538°S 147.8452°E). In 2016, the school had an enrolment of 50 students. In 2018, the school had an enrolment of 60 students with 6 teachers (5 full-time equivalent) and 7 non-teaching staff (4 full-time equivalent).

Collinsville State High School is a government secondary (7-12) school for boys and girls at Walker Street (20.5484°S 147.8346°E). It includes a special education program. In 2014, the school had an enrolment of 77 students with 12 teachers (11 full-time equivalent). In 2018, the school had an enrolment of 91 students with 13 teachers and 14 non-teaching staff (9 full-time equivalent).

== Attractions ==
A recreational vehicle park has been built offering 72-hour free stays for recreational vehicles and campervans.
