= Marlborough–Sarina Road =

Road in Queensland, Australia

Marlborough–Sarina Road (Inland route) Queensland
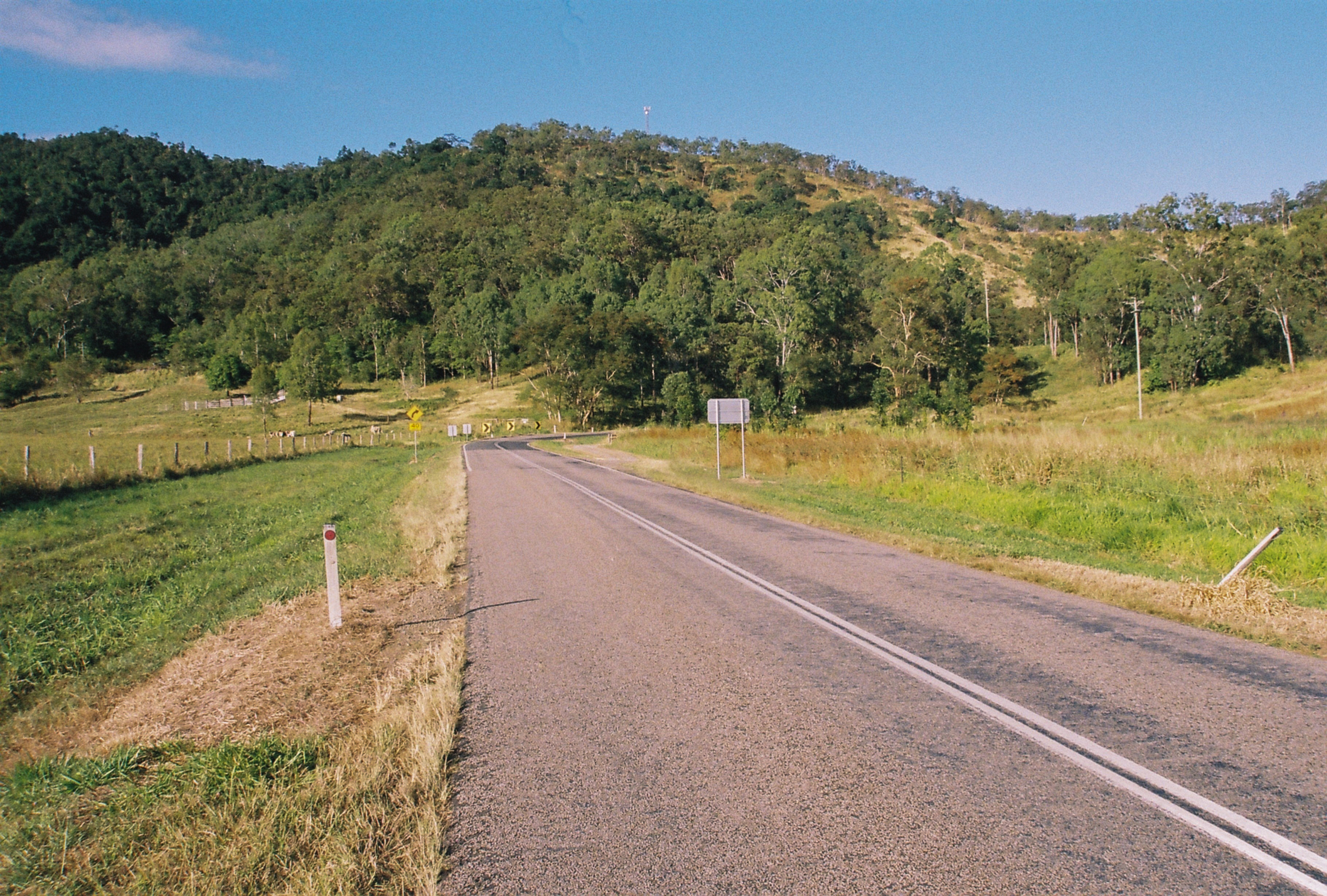
- Marlborough–Sarina Road with the Sarina Range ahead, 2013

General information
- Type: Road
- Length: 243 km (151 mi)

Major junctions
- South end: Bruce Highway, Marlborough
- Duaringa–Apis Creek Road; May Downs Road; St Lawrence–Croydon Road; Oxford Downs–Sarina Road; Blue Mountain Road; Koumala–Bolingbroke Road
- North end: Bruce Highway Sarina

Marlborough–Sarina Road is a state-controlled district road (number 512) rated as a local road of regional significance (LRRS). It runs from the Bruce Highway in Marlborough, via an inland route, to the Bruce Highway in Sarina, a distance of 243 kilometres (151 mi). It was part of the Bruce Highway until 1982.

== Route description ==
Marlborough–Sarina Road starts at an intersection with the Bruce Highway in Marlborough. It runs southwest and west as Marlborough Road through the localities of Marlborough and Mount Gardiner, where it passes the exit to Duaringa–Apis Creek Road to the south. Next it turns northwest as Marlborough–Sarina Road through Clarke Creek, where it passes the exit to May Downs Road to the southwest. Continuing northwest through Lotus Creek it passes the exit to St Lawrence–Croydon Road to the northeast. Turning north it passes through Oxford, crossing Funnel Creek as it enters Nebo.

It passes the exit to Oxford Downs–Sarina Road to the southwest before turning northeast through Nebo and into Blue Mountain, where it passes the exit to Blue Mountain Road to the northwest. Turning east it enters Sarina Range, where it passes the exit to Koumala–Bolingbroke Road to the southeast. Turning northeast it continues through Sarina Range and into Sarina, where it ends at an intersection with the Bruce Highway.

The road provides access to the rural communities along its route and on intersecting roads. It also facilitates cross traffic between the Bruce Highway, Capricorn Highway, Fitzroy Developmental Road, and Peak Downs Highway.

== History ==
By 1860 a track from Gladstone to Bowen included a section from Marlborough to St Lawrence, but it ran inland from St Lawrence and did not proceed along the coast to Sarina. A likely route for the section of track from St Lawrence to Nebo is attached. A few years later a track through low-lying swampy country was established from St Lawrence to Sarina and Mackay. By the late 1800s this track had become a widely used but difficult coach road. In the 1920s motorists began using this road.

In 1940 the coast road was still in poor condition and it was decided to build a sealed inland road from Marlborough to the Sarina–Clermont Road (now the Oxford Downs–Sarina Road) near the location of Wandoo pastoral station. Progress was slow, but by 1949 a track had been cleared and some bridges built. Bitumen sealing commenced in the early 1950s. Work continued until 1962, when the bitumen seal was completed, but much of it was only to a width of 3.6 metres (12 ft). This was the first sealed road from Marlborough to Sarina and became part of the National Highway. Between 1962 and 1973 the widening of bitumen seal and narrow bridges was undertaken.

In the mid 1950s the road was used for the Round Australia Reliability Trials, where many cars suffered damage, particularly on undeveloped, rocky, low level creek crossings. This led to the press labelling the road a "Horror Stretch". In the 1960s several murders and shootings occurred along the road, further enhancing its "bad" reputation.

In 1974 it was decided that the coast road would be upgraded to highway standard to become part of the National Highway, and funding was transferred to that project. On 29 October 1982 the upgraded coast road was opened as part of the National Highway.

== Major intersections ==
All distances are from Google Maps. The road is within the Livingstone, Isaac and Mackay local government areas.

LGA	Location	km	mi	Destinations	Notes
Livingstone	Marlborough	0	0.0	Bruce Highway – southeast – Rockhampton northwest – St Lawrence	Southern end of Marlborough–Sarina Road. Road runs southwest as Marlborough Road.
Livingstone	Mount Gardiner	37.5	23.3	Duaringa–Apis Creek Road – south – Duaringa, Capricorn Highway	Road continues northwest.
Livingstone / Isaac midpoint	Mount Gardiner / Clarke Creek midpoint	54	34		Road turns northwest as Marlborough–Sarina Road.
Isaac	Clarke Creek	83.5	51.9	May Downs Road – southwest – May Downs, Fitzroy Developmental Road	Road continues northwest.
Isaac	Lotus Creek	107	66	St Lawrence–Croydon Road – northeast – St Lawrence, Bruce Highway	Road continues northwest.
Isaac	Nebo	189	117	Oxford Downs–Sarina Road – southwest – Strathfield, Peak Downs Highway	Road continues northeast.
Isaac	Blue Mountain	213	132	Blue Mountain Road – northwest – Blue Mountain, Peak Downs Highway	Road continues northeast.
Mackay	Sarina Range	216	134	Koumala–Bolingbroke Road – southeast – Koumala, Bruce Highway	Road continues northeast.
Mackay	Sarina	243	151	Bruce Highway – north – Mackay – south – Koumala	Northern end of Marlborough–Sarina Road.
1.000 mi = 1.609 km; 1.000 km = 0.621 mi: Route transition

== Intersecting state-controlled roads ==
The following state-controlled roads intersect with this road:

- Duaringa–Apis Creek Road
- May Downs Road
- St Lawrence–Croydon Road
- Oxford Downs–Sarina Road
- Blue Mountain Road
- Koumala–Bolingbroke Road

=== Duaringa–Apis Creek Road ===
Duaringa–Apis Creek Road (Apis Creek Road)
- Location: Duaringa Connection Road, Duaringa to Marlborough–Sarina Road, Mount Gardiner
- Length: 104 km (65 mi)

Duaringa–Apis Creek Road (Apis Creek Road) is a state-controlled district road (number 5101), rated as a local road of regional significance (LRRS). It runs from Duaringa Connection Road in Duaringa to Marlborough–Sarina Road in Mount Gardiner, a distance of 104 kilometres (65 mi). It has no intersections with other state-controlled roads.

NOTE: Apis Creek is a pastoral property in the locality of Mount Gardiner.

=== May Downs Road ===
May Downs Road
- Location: Marlborough–Sarina Road, Clarke Creek to Fitzroy Developmental Road, May Downs
- Length: 69.6 km (43.2 mi)

May Downs Road is a state-controlled district road (number 5122), rated as a local road of regional significance (LRRS). It runs from Marlborough–Sarina Road in Clarke Creek to Fitzroy Developmental Road in May Downs, a distance of 69.6 kilometres (43.2 mi). It has no intersections with other state-controlled roads.

=== St Lawrence–Croydon Road ===
St Lawrence–Croydon Road
- Location: Bruce Highway, St Lawrence to Marlborough–Sarina Road, Lotus Creek
- Length: 44.2 km (27.5 mi)

St Lawrence–Croydon Road is a state-controlled district road (number 5124), rated as a local road of regional significance (LRRS). It runs from the Bruce Highway in St Lawrence to Marlborough–Sarina Road in Lotus Creek, a distance of 44.2 kilometres (27.5 mi). It has no intersections with other state-controlled roads, but it connects at its eastern end with St Lawrence Connection Road.

NOTE: Croydon Station is a beef cattle farm in the locality of Lotus Creek.

=== Oxford Downs–Sarina Road ===
Oxford Downs–Sarina Road
- Location: Peak Downs Highway, Strathfield to Marlborough–Sarina Road, Nebo
- Length: 27.5 km (17.1 mi)

Oxford Downs–Sarina Road is a state-controlled district road (number 514), rated as a local road of regional significance (LRRS). It runs from the Peak Downs Highway in Strathfield to Marlborough–Sarina Road in Nebo, a distance of 27.5 kilometres (17.1 mi). It has no intersections with other state-controlled roads.

NOTE: Oxford Downs Station is a beef cattle property in the locality of Nebo.

=== Blue Mountain Road ===
Blue Mountain Road
- Location: Marlborough–Sarina Road, Blue Mountain to Peak Downs Highway, Blue Mountain
- Length: 28.4 km (17.6 mi)

Blue Mountain Road is a state-controlled district road (number 5127), rated as a local road of regional significance (LRRS). It runs from Marlborough–Sarina Road in Blue Mountain to the Peak Downs Highway in Blue Mountain, a distance of 28.4 kilometres (17.6 mi). It has no intersections with other state-controlled roads.

=== Koumala–Bolingbroke Road ===
Koumala–Bolingbroke Road
- Location: Bruce Highway, Koumala to Marlborough–Sarina Road, Sarina Range
- Length: 23.6 km (14.7 mi)

Koumala–Bolingbroke Road is a state-controlled district road (number 5126), rated as a local road of regional significance (LRRS). It runs from the Bruce Highway in Koumala to Marlborough–Sarina Road in Sarina Range, a distance of 23.6 kilometres (14.7 mi). It has no intersections with other state-controlled roads.

NOTE: Bolingbroke Homestead is on a pastoral property of the same name, on Bolingbroke Creek, in the locality of Koumala.

== Linked state-controlled roads ==
The following state-controlled roads are linked to intersecting state-controlled roads:

- Duaringa Connection Road
- St Lawrence Connection Road

=== Duaringa Connection Road ===
Duaringa Connection Road
- Location: Duaringa–Apis Creek Road, Duaringa to Capricorn Highway, Duaringa
- Length: 0.85 km (0.53 mi; 2,800 ft)

Duaringa Connection Road is a state-controlled district road (number 515), rated as a local road of regional significance (LRRS). It runs from Duaringa–Apis Creek Road in Duaringa to the Capricorn Highway in Duaringa, a distance of 0.85 kilometres (0.53 mi). It has no intersections with other state-controlled roads.

=== St Lawrence Connection Road ===
St Lawrence Connection Road
- Location: Bruce Highway, St Lawrence to Macartney Street, St Lawrence
- Length: 6.9 km (4.3 mi)

St Lawrence Connection Road is a state-controlled district road (number 858), rated as a local road of regional significance (LRRS). It runs from the Bruce Highway in St Lawrence to Macartney Street in St Lawrence, a distance of 6.9 kilometres (4.3 mi). It has no intersections with other state-controlled roads.

== See also ==
- List of numbered roads in Queensland
