= Murders of Noel and Sophia Weckert =

1975 homicide in Queensland, Australia

The murders of Noel Milton Weckert and his wife Sophia Janine Weckert occurred in two separate locations on the Bruce Highway, between the cities of Rockhampton and Mackay, in Queensland, on 22 March 1975. At the time of the murders, the couple was en route to the Capricorn Coast village of Emu Park, where Noel Weckert had intended to take part in an organised skydiving event.

They had departed from Townsville the previous afternoon. It is believed that they had pulled over next to the Connors River, between the towns of Sarina and Marlborough with the intention of taking a short break, when Noel Weckert was shot and Sophia Weckert was abducted.

== Murders ==
=== Discovery of Noel Weckert's body ===
Noel Weckert's body was discovered by a truck driver at around 6 am on 22 March 1975. Shortly thereafter, the police released the statement that he had been shot twice from close range sometime between 4 am and 4:30 am, while seated at the steering wheel of his stationary vehicle, still strapped into his seat belt.

=== Search for Sophia Weckert ===
There was no trace of Sophia Weckert at the scene of her husband's murder. The police believed that she might have been abducted by her husband's killer, and hence began a thorough search of the portion of the highway stretching between Townsville and Maryborough. They commenced by setting up roadblocks in the hope that she may still be alive.

An old grey and white station wagon, similar to the one sighted in the Connors River area, was seen crossing over the Queensland/New South Wales border at Wallangarra. When a pool of blood was discovered in the same area, a search was conducted in the adjoining bush-land. The blood was later discovered as being that of a cow.

A man and a woman, driving an old station wagon, were apprehended stealing fuel from a Brunswick Heads service station. The yellow drum that they had left behind in Brunswick Heads was similar to a yellow drum that the couple had used on the morning of the murder, three kilometers away from where Noel Weckert had been found. As time passed, the police became more convinced that Sophia Weckert was no longer alive, and believed that her body had been dumped in the Connors River. Police divers were dispatched from Mackay to search waterholes along the Connors River.

=== Discovery of Sophia Weckert's body ===
A woman's body was found on 27 March 1975. It was quickly confirmed to be that of Sophia Weckert, after a Townsville dentist was able to identify her through dental x-rays.

Sophia Weckert's body was found near Kennedy Creek, approximately 30 kilometers north of where her husband had been shot dead. The person who found her body was a local Sarina man, who had stopped on the highway due to car trouble. At the time of discovery, her body was face down, and was lying at a distance of fifty meters from the highway. Police said they believed that she had been shot in the back while attempting to run for her life.

== Investigation ==
Within a week of Noel Weckert's murder, police said that they suspected a prison escapee was responsible for this crime. The escapee had been last seen driving a white 1974 Holden Belmont station wagon, which had been stolen from Victoria two months prior. Police said that they believed him as being armed, and also suspected him for the attempted rape of a hitchhiker on 14 March 1975.

After Sophia Weckert's body had been found, police continued looking for a "jockey-sized" man who had escaped from the Palen Creek Correctional Centre near Brisbane.

On 30 March 1975, police conducted an early morning raid on a house in Wavell Heights, after having spotted the Holden Belmont station wagon at Caboolture. They arrested the man whom they believed as having escaped from Palen Creek, and who they believed had committed the murders of Noel and Sophia Weckert. However, police soon confirmed that they were unlikely to lay any charges against him in connection with the murders as he was believed to have been in Brisbane on the day of the crime.

Police confirmed they were also extending their inquiries to the Northern Territory, after six men had escaped from Fannie Bay Gaol, which had been severely damaged by Cyclone Tracy on 25 December 1974.

The Queensland Government announced on 1 April 1975, that they had approved a $20,000 reward for any information that led to a conviction for the murders of Noel and Sophia Weckert. Minister of Police Max Hodges confirmed that the reward would include a pardon to any accomplice not directly involved with committing the offences.

=== Breakthrough ===
Police made a breakthrough in June, 1975, when they began questioning the two inmates at the Goulburn Jail in New South Wales. A police spokesperson in Goulburn said that the two men had made "certain admissions".

During an appearance at the Sydney Central Court, a magistrate ordered the two prisoners, Raymond John Wylie (aged 21) and Maxwell John Harper (aged 24), to be extradited to Queensland to face murder charges.

Previously, Janice Christine Anne Payne, a 17-year-old girl from George Town, Tasmania had also been served with an extradition order during a court appearance in Launceston after being charged with the murder of Noel Weckert.

== Initial Court Appearances ==
Maxwell John Harper, Raymond John Wylie and Janice Christine Anne Payne all appeared in Mackay Magistrates Court on 9 July 1975, and were charged with murder. All three were remanded in custody.

Committal proceedings began in Mackay on 5 September 1975, during which Wylie's defence lawyer complained about Wylie and Harper having been handcuffed together, and requested that they be uncuffed. The magistrate refused and said that the two men would remain handcuffed throughout the proceedings.

On the fifth day of committal proceedings, the magistrate committed Wylie, Harper and Payne to stand trial for the murders of Noel and Sophia Weckert. The magistrate formally charged them with having murdered Noel Miltern Weckert at Connors River on 22 March 1975, and having murdered Sophia Janine Weckert at Kennedy Creek later on the same day. All three pleaded not guilty to the murders.

== Trials ==
Two separate trials were held in Rockhampton for the murders of Noel and Sophia Weckert.

=== First trial ===
The trial for the murder of Noel Weckert began in the Rockhampton Supreme Court on 26 February 1976. This trial continued for two weeks.

At the conclusion of the trial, the jury deliberated for four hours before returning their verdicts. Raymond John Wylie was found guilty of murdering Noel Weckert. Maxwell John Harper and Janice Christine Anne Payne were found guilty of manslaughter. Wylie was sentenced to life imprisonment. Harper and Payne were sentenced to seven years jail.

=== Second trial ===
The trial for the murder of Sophia Weckert was held in Rockhampton in February 1977. After hearing the evidence, the jury deliberated for five hours before returning their verdicts on 23 February 1977.

Raymond John Wylie and Maxwell John Harper were both found guilty of murdering Sophia Weckert. Janice Christine Anne Payne was found guilty of manslaughter. Wylie and Harper were sentenced to life imprisonment. Payne was sentenced to ten years' imprisonment, partly concurrent with the original seven years that she had received at the previous trial.

=== Appeals ===
Harper and Payne appealed against their respective convictions for the murder and manslaughter of Sophia Weckert, but their appeals were unanimously dismissed by the Queensland Court of Criminal Appeal in May 1977.

Payne then sought special leave in November, 1978, to again appeal against her manslaughter conviction but her application was unanimously refused by the Full High Court.

== Bruce Highway safety concerns ==
The murders of Noel and Sophia Weckert prompted public concerns about the safety of Bruce Highway, particularly the portion of the highway stretching between Marlborough and Sarina. Graziers on properties between Rockhampton and Mackay called for better police protection following numerous violent incidents.

After the reports of Noel Weckert's murder, Minister for Northern Development Rex Patterson publicly stated that he always traveled along the highway with a loaded rifle to ensure his own protection. It was a statement similar to the one he had originally made in 1967, wherein he had said that the stretch of road between Marlborough and Sarina was becoming renowned as "death alley" owing to the frequent occurrence of murders, shootings and ambushes.

In response to these concerns, the police in Rockhampton said that they had received orders to maintain patrols for at least 18 hours a day on the highway between Marlborough and Sarina. A police officer would be sent to Marlborough to patrol the highway between Marlborough and Lotus Creek, while another police officer from Sarina would patrol the northern section.

Due to the high frequency of crime, the highway also earned the nickname "The Badlands". The highway between Marlborough and Sarina was realigned in 1982, and the sealed road which had served as the Bruce Highway at the time of the Weckert murders is now known as Marlborough-Sarina Road.
