= Tooloombah, Queensland =

Tooloombah Queensland
- Coordinates: 22.7056°S 149.5677°E
- Postcode(s): 4706
- Time zone: AEST (UTC+10:00)
- Location: 146 km (91 mi) NW of Rockhampton; 170 km (106 mi) NW of Yeppoon; 204 km (127 mi) S of Mackay; 785 km (488 mi) NNW of Brisbane
- LGA(s): Livingstone Shire
- State electorate(s): Mirani
- Federal division(s): Capricornia

Tooloombah is a rural town in the Livingstone Shire, Queensland, Australia. It is within the locality of Ogmore.

== History ==
Town lots were sold in Tooloombah in June 1862.
