= Florence James-Wallace =

Australian WWI nurse

Florence Elizabeth James-Wallace
- Born: 1886; St Lawrence, Queensland, Australia
- Died: 1970 (aged 83–84); New Zealand
- Other name: Florence Mellsop
- Military career
- Branch: Australian Army Nursing Service
- Service years: 1915-1919
- Unit: Unit 3, Australian General Hospital (3AGH)
- Awards: 1914–15 Star; British War Medal; Victory Medal

Florence Elizabeth James-Wallace (1886–1970) was an Australian nurse, who served with the Australian Army Nursing Service during World War I. She and her unit were praised for their service in support of the Australian soldiers.

== Early life ==
Florence Elizabeth James-Wallace (later Florence Mellsop) was born in 1886 at Killarney Station, St Lawrence, Queensland. She was the fifth child of John Thornhill James-Wallace and his wife Marie Bernard. After the death of her father, the family moved to Brisbane and James-Wallace trained as a nurse at the Brisbane General Hospital. She gained her Nursing Certificate in 1910. She took a position in Wellington, New Zealand and then returned to Australia to work in Longreach, Queensland. When World War I broke out, her elder brother joined the AIF and James-Wallace joined the Australian Army Nursing Service (AANS) in Brisbane. She was assigned to Unit 3, Australian General Hospital (3AGH) on 26 April 1915.

== War Service ==
James-Wallace and her hospital unit left Australia in May 1915, expecting to serve in France after first landing in England. After disembarking in London, they were dispatched to Mudros, on the Greek Island of Lemnos, fifty miles from where the ANZAC units were fighting in Gallipoli, Turkey. Arriving in early August, in advance of their hospital supply ship they were compelled to treat casualties the day after their arrival. They had no clean water or medical supplies with which to begin.

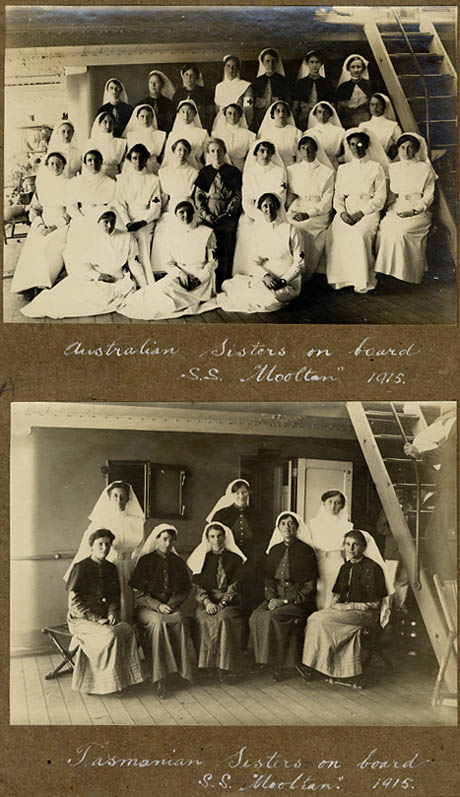
Australian Sisters on board Mooltan - Tasmanian Sisters on board, 1915 A.W. Savage

James-Wallace and the nurses of the 3AGH spent five months on Lemnos. She and her unit's experiences were photographed by Private Albert William Savage and James-Wallace purchased over 116 photographs from Savage. The last Australians were evacuated from Gallipoli on the night of 19/20 December 1915 as the campaign was disbanded. After Christmas on Lemnos the hospitals were disbanded and James-Wallace and the 3AGH nurses sailed on 14 January 1916 to a port in Egypt. The nurses were stationed in Abbassia, Egypt for 8 months before being sent to Brighton, England and then Abbeville, France where they served until August 1918. She and the other nurses worked in Casualty Clearing Stations near Bapaume and Villers-Bretonneux, which saw heavy shelling and some of the worst casualties. They joined the 1st Australian Auxiliary Hospital in Harefield, England in late August 1918. James-Wallace was mentioned in despatches.

James-Wallace returned to Australia in 1919, disembarking in Melbourne before being discharged on 23 May 1919. Like other serving soldiers, she received the 1914-15 Star, British War Medal and Victory Medal in recognition of her war service. As part of the Soldier Settlement program offered by the Commonwealth to returning veterans, James-Wallace was allotted a land portion of the Waterworks Road Soldier Settlement - Enoggera parish in The Gap in Brisbane.

== Later life ==
James-Wallace first lived with her sister and mother in Wynnum after her return to Brisbane. However rheumatism and arthritis, brought on by the cold damp conditions at the hospitals on Lemnos and in France, which was a common experience amongst many of the army nurses, prevented her return to full-time nursing. She rested and nursed privately part-time, living in her home at The Gap. After 1923, when she gave up her soldier settlement, she accepted a position as a nurse in Auckland. She married Harry Oswald Mellsop in Auckland in 1927.

== Legacy ==
James-Wallace visited her family in Queensland many times over the next three decades but continuing ill health from her war service confined her to hospital for an extensive period. On her final visit to Australia she left the photo albums of her time spent in the AANC with her Australian family. She died in New Zealand in 1970. Her photo albums were donated to the Fryer Library, The University of Queensland where they have been digitised.
