= Collaroy =

Collaroy may refer to:

- Collaroy Plateau
- Collaroy, New South Wales
- Collaroy, Queensland
