= Oxford, Queensland =

Oxford
- Suburb
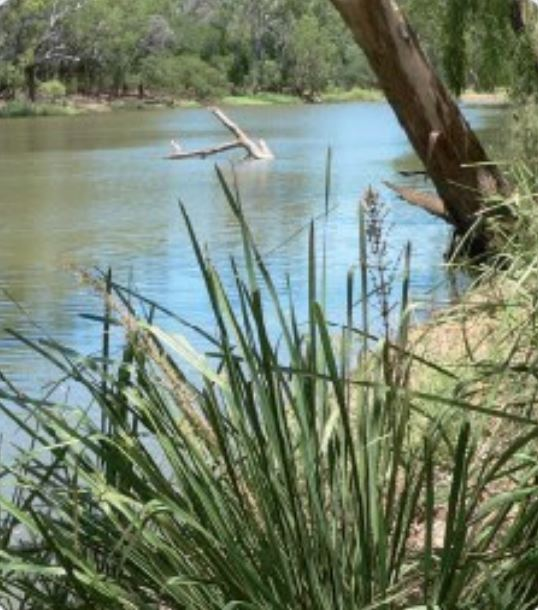
- Dipperu National Park, 2011

- Interactive map of Oxford
- Coordinates: 21.8663°S 148.7611°E
- Country: Australia
- State: Queensland
- LGA: Isaac Region
- Location: 52.7 km (32.7 mi) SE of Nebo; 75.7 km (47.0 mi) SW of Sarina; 112 km (70 mi) SSW of Mackay; 133 km (83 mi) ENE of Moranbah; 928 km (577 mi) NNW of Brisbane

Government
  - State electorates: Mirani; Burdekin
  - Federal division: Capricornia

Area
  - Total: 1,071.9 km^{2} (413.9 sq mi)

Population
  - Total: 43 (2021 census)
  - Density: 0.0401/km^{2} (0.1039/sq mi)
- Time zone: UTC+10:00 (AEST)
- Postcode: 4742
Suburbs around Oxford
Strathfield	Nebo	Koumala
Coppabella	Oxford	Collaroy
Valkyrie	Lotus Creek	Collaroy

Oxford is a rural locality in the Isaac Region, Queensland, Australia. In the 2021 census, Oxford had a population of 43 people.

== Geography ==
The Goonyella railway line forms part of the northern boundary of the locality with Nebo to the north and also passes through the western corner of the locality from Strathfield to Coppabella.

In the west of the locality, the Fitzroy Developmental Road enters the locality from the south-west (Valkyrie) and exits to the north-west (Strathfield). In the east of the locality, the Marlborough–Sarina Road enters the locality from the south (Lotus Creek) and exits to the north (Nebo).

There are two state forests in the east of the locality:

- Rosedale State Forest, extending into neighbouring Collaroy to the east
- Tierawoomba State Forest, in three sections, two of which extend into neighbouring Lotus Creek to the south

Dipperu National Park is in the south-west of the locality. It contains a large and significant brigalow forest of exceptional scientific value in the North Brigalow Belt.

== Demographics ==
In the 2016 census, Oxford had a population of 39 people.

In the 2021 census, Oxford had a population of 43 people.

== Education ==
There are no schools in Oxford. The nearest government primary schools are:

- Koumala State School in neighbouring Koumala to the north-east
- Nebo State School in neighbouring Nebo to the north
- Coppabella State School in neighbouring Coppabella to the west
- Valkyrie State School in neighbouring Valkyrie to the south-west

However, some students in Oxford could too distant from these schools for a daily commute; the alternatives are distance education and boarding school.

Similarly, the nearest government secondary school is Sarina State High School in Sarina to the north-east, but most students in Oxford would be too distant to attend it with distance education and boarding school being the alternatives.
