= Paul Kirkham (priest) =

Paul Kirkham was an Anglican priest in the twentieth century.

Kirkham was educated at Moore Theological College. He was ordained deacon in 1935, and priest in 1936. After a curacy in Blenheim he held incumbencies at Motueka, Greymouth and Wakefield. He was Archdeacon of Marlborough from 1949 until 1966; and Archdeacon of Waimea from 1966 until 1971.
