= Mount Gardiner, Queensland =

Mount Gardiner
- Suburb
- Interactive map of Mount Gardiner
- Coordinates: 22.9755°S 149.5102°E
- Country: Australia
- State: Queensland
- LGA: Livingstone Shire
- Location: 54.7 km (34.0 mi) WSW of Marlborough; 160 km (99 mi) NW of Rockhampton; 182 km (113 mi) W of Yeppoon; 778 km (483 mi) NNW of Brisbane

Government
  - State electorate: Mirani
  - Federal division: Capricornia

Area
  - Total: 592.1 km^{2} (228.6 sq mi)

Population
  - Total: 19 (2021 census)
  - Density: 0.0321/km^{2} (0.0831/sq mi)
- Time zone: UTC+10:00 (AEST)
- Postcode: 4705
Suburbs around Mount Gardiner
Clarke Creek	Ogmore	Marlborough
Mackenzie	Mount Gardiner	Marlborough
Mackenzie	Mackenzie	Marlborough

Mount Gardiner is a rural locality in the Livingstone Shire, Queensland, Australia. In the 2021 census, Mount Gardiner had a population of 19 people.

== Geography ==
Mount Gardiner has the following mountains:

- Crows Nest (22.8618°S 149.5422°E)
- Mount Benmore (23.0195°S 149.5783°E) 265 metres (869 ft)
- Mount Gardiner (22.9862°S 149.5419°E)
- Mount Mckenzie (22.8617°S 149.4402°E) 312 metres (1,024 ft)

The Marlborough–Sarina Road runs through the north of the locality.

The land use is predominantly grazing on native vegetation with a small amount of crop growing.

== Demographics ==
In the 2016 census, Mount Gardiner had a population of 34 people.

In the 2021 census, Mount Gardiner had a population of 19 people.

== Economy ==
Despite the name, Clarke Creek Wind Farm is on Malborough Road in Mount Gardiner (22.85045°S 149.45328°E). As at February 2025, 72 out of 100 turbines are complete with testing showing that 16 wind turbines operating simultaneously can deliver a total capacity of 70MW.

== Education ==
There are no schools in Mount Gardiner. The nearest government primary schools are Marlborough State School in neighbouring Marlborough to the north-east and Clarke Creek State School in neighbouring Clarke Creek to the north-west.

There are no secondary schools nearby. Distance education and boarding schools are the alternatives.
