= Dipperu National Park =

National park in Australia

- IUCN category Ia (strict nature reserve)
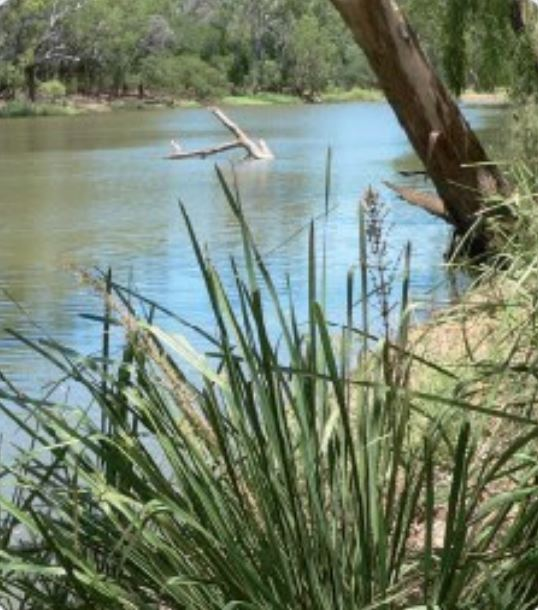
- Dipperu National Park, 2011

- Location within Queensland
- Location: Queensland
- Coordinates: 21.93639°S 148.71639°E
- Area: 111 km^{2} (43 sq mi)
- Established: 1969
- Governing body: Queensland Parks and Wildlife Service

Dipperu is a scientific national park in Oxford, Isaac Region, Central Queensland, Australia, 754 km northwest of Brisbane. The elevation of the terrain is 176 metres.

== Significance ==
The national park contains a large and significant brigalow forest of exceptional scientific value in the North Brigalow Belt.

== Wildlife ==
226 species of animals have been recorded in the park, of which 7 are endangered species. Also 260 plants have their habitat here.

== See also ==
- Protected areas of Queensland
