= Collaroy, Queensland =

Collaroy
- Suburb
- Interactive map of Collaroy
- Coordinates: 22.0730°S 149.2788°E
- Country: Australia
- State: Queensland
- LGA: Isaac Region
- Location: 120 km (75 mi) S of Sarina; 156 km (97 mi) S of Mackay; 178 km (111 mi) E of Moranbah; 234 km (145 mi) NW of Rockhampton; 872 km (542 mi) NNW of Brisbane

Government
  - State electorate: Mirani
  - Federal division: Capricornia

Area
  - Total: 1,325.8 km^{2} (511.9 sq mi)

Population
  - Total: 0 (2021 census)
  - Density: 0.0000/km^{2} (0.0000/sq mi)
- Time zone: UTC+10:00 (AEST)
- Postcode: 4707
Suburbs around Collaroy
Oxford	Koumala; Ilbilbie	Carmila
Lotus Creek	Collaroy	Clairview
Lotus Creek	St Lawrence	St Lawrence

Collaroy is a rural locality in the Isaac Region, Queensland, Australia. In the 2021 census, Collaroy had "no people or a very low population".

== Geography ==
The Collaroy State Forest lies in the north-east of the locality, while the Rosedale State Forest is in the north-west of the locality extending into neighbouring Oxford to the north-east. Apart from these protected areas, the land use is grazing on native vegetation.

Collaroy has the following mountains (from north to south):

- Sugarloaf Mountain (21.8123°S 149.1978°E) 520 metres (1,710 ft)
- The Knob (21.9663°S 149.3343°E) 507 metres (1,663 ft)
- Mount Toobier (22.0018°S 149.2864°E) 567 metres (1,860 ft)
- Gins Leap (22.0193°S 149.1239°E) 382 metres (1,253 ft)
- Five Mile Mountain (22.0952°S 149.2099°E) 352 metres (1,155 ft)
- Sugarloaf (22.1217°S 149.2084°E) 268 metres (879 ft)
- Pint Pot Mountain (22.1742°S 149.1951°E) 370 metres (1,210 ft)
- Hill 60 (22.2189°S 149.2441°E) 342 metres (1,122 ft)
- Peach Mountain (22.2993°S 149.2730°E) 486 metres (1,594 ft)
- Vinegar Hill (22.3034°S 149.3044°E) 485 metres (1,591 ft)
- The Alps (22.3356°S 149.2682°E) 526 metres (1,726 ft)

== Demographics ==
In the 2016 census, Collaroy had a population of 9 people.

In the 2021 census, Collaroy had "no people or a very low population".

== Education ==
There are no schools in Collaroy. The nearest government primary schools are:

- Koumala State School in neighbouring Koumala to the north
- Carmila State School in neighbouring Carmila to the north-east
- St Lawrence State School in neighbouring St Lawrence to the south-east
- Clarke Creek State School in Clarke Creek to the south

The nearest government secondary school is Sarina State High School in Sarina to the north.

However, students in the west of Collaroy would be too distant from any of these primary schools schools and most students would be too distant to attend Sarina State High School. The alternatives are distance education and boarding school.
