= Lotus Creek, Queensland =

Lotus Creek
- Suburb
- Interactive map of Lotus Creek
- Coordinates: 22.255°S 149.0519°E
- Country: Australia
- State: Queensland
- LGA: Isaac Region
- Location: 175 km (109 mi) S of Mackay; 188 km (117 mi) SE of Moranbah; 211 km (131 mi) NW of Rockhampton; 852 km (529 mi) NNW of Brisbane

Government
  - State electorates: Mirani; Burdekin
  - Federal division: Capricornia

Area
  - Total: 2,542.6 km^{2} (981.7 sq mi)

Population
  - Total: 113 (2021 census)
  - Density: 0.04444/km^{2} (0.1151/sq mi)
- Time zone: UTC+10:00 (AEST)
- Postcode: 4705
Suburbs around Lotus Creek
Oxford	Oxford	Collaroy
Valkyrie	Lotus Creek	Collaroy
May Downs	Clarke Creek	St Lawrence

Lotus Creek is a rural locality in the Isaac Region, Queensland, Australia. In the 2021 census, Lotus Creek had a population of 113 people.

== Geography ==
The locality is loosely bounded to the south-west by the Isaac River and to the west by its tributary Connors River and to the north-west by its tributary Funnel Creek.

The Marlborough-Sarina Road enters the locality from the south (Clarkes Creek) and exits to the north (Oxford).

The Tierawoomba State Forest is in the north-east of the locality extending into neighbouring Oxford. Apart from this protected area, the predominant land use is grazing on native vegetation.

== History ==
Baradha (also known as Barada, Toolginburra, Baradaybahrad, Thararraburra, Toolginburra, and Baradha) is an Australian Aboriginal language spoken by the Baradha people. The Baradha language region includes the locality of Lotus Creek and extends along the inland ranges towards Nebo and extends along the Connors River catchment.

The Marlborough-Sarina Road was formerly part of the Bruce Highway. However, it developed a reputation as a "horror road" as it was narrow and winding with creekbed crossings and many vehicles sustained damage. A number of murders of travellers using the road (e.g. the 1975 murders of Noel and Sophia Weckert) caused fear. In 1974, it was decided that a coastal route via Carmila would be developed to eliminate the Malborough-Sarina Road from the Bruce Highway.

== Demographics ==
In the 2016 census, Lotus Creek had a population of 75 people.

In the 2021 census, Lotus Creek had a population of 113 people.

== Education ==
There are no schools in Lotus Creek. The nearest government primary schools are:

- Nebo State School in Nebo to the north-west
- St Lawrence State School in neighbouring St Lawrence to the south-west
- Clarke Creek State School in neighbouring Clarke Creek to the south

However, some parts of Lotus Creek are too distant from these schools for a daily commute and there is no nearby secondary school. The alternatives are distance education and boarding schools.
