= Meatworks and Wharf Site, St Lawrence =

Meatworks and Wharf Site
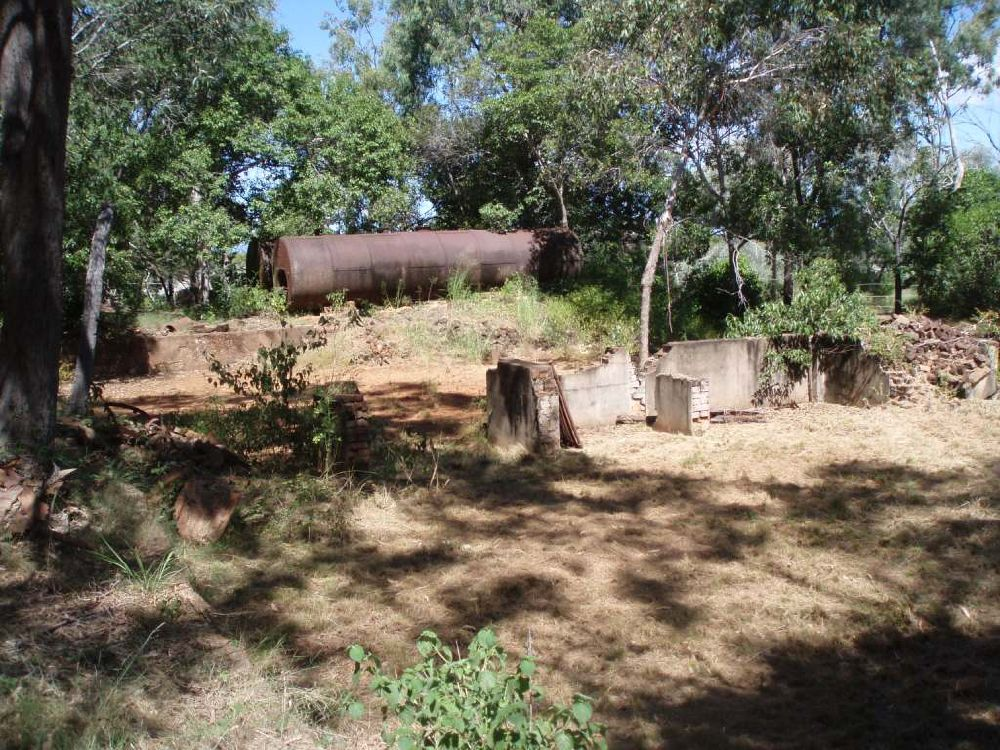
- Meatworks and Wharf Site, 2009

- Location within Queensland Location within Australia
- 22.3758°S 149.565°E
- Location: Settlement Road, St Lawrence, Isaac Region, Queensland, Australia

History
- Design period: 1870s - 1890s (late 19th century)
- Built: 1870s - 1890s

Queensland Heritage Register
- Official name: Meatworks and Wharf Site (former), Former Broadsound Meat Company, Former Broadsound Packing Co Ltd, Former Newport Meatworks Company
- Type: state heritage (archaeological)
- Designated: 23 February 2001
- Reference no.: 601173
- Significant period: 1870s-1890s (fabric); 1863-1911 (historical)
- Significant components: shaft, machinery/plant/equipment - manufacturing/processing, embankment - tramway, ford, road/roadway

Meatworks and Wharf Site is a heritage-listed former abattoir and wharf at Settlement Road, St Lawrence, Isaac Region, Queensland, Australia. It was built from 1870s to 1890s. It is also known as Broadsound Meat Company, Broadsound Packing Co Ltd, and Newport Meatworks Company. It was added to the Queensland Heritage Register on 23 February 2001.

== History ==
The former meatworks and wharf site is thought to be established in the 1860s as a boiling down works. By 1893, the meatworks had been established and remained in operation until around 1911. The St Lawrence area was settled by 1860, when Macartney formed Waverley Station. Around the same time, John Mackay was travelling in the area.

The meatworks was one of the largest projects undertaken in the history of St Lawrence. It has been suggested that the meatworks owed its origin to the fact that a boiling down works had been established about four miles from the town near the wharf on Waverley Creek. The purpose of the boiling down process was to recover the fat or tallow from cattle which were usually considered below standard for putting through the butcher shop. The demand for tallow would have been much greater in that period of Australian history, for tallow was very much in demand for use in candles and for preserving harnesses.

Boiling down works have been an important industry throughout Queensland during a number of periods. The establishment of such works usually coincided with drought and low prices for wool and beef. Boiling-down factories were started in Brisbane in 1843 by John "Tinker" Campbell and in Ipswich in 1847. By 1851, two works were located in Ipswich. Other boiling down works being established on the Darling Downs during the 1860s, included Campbell's operation on Westbrook Homestead, the depression of the time being the predominant reason behind the establishment of such industries. Consequently, reasons behind the establishment of the boiling down works at St Lawrence may also have been due to the effects of the depression.

By 1865 the Queensland Government was in the process of extending the telegraph line between St Lawrence and Bowen, and to the Gulf of Carpentaria. In 1866, the Government proposed an impost on wool, tallow and hides. The Queensland Legislative Council considered the resolution to present the Governor with a Bill to be introduced to the Legislative Council to impose an export duty on one halfpenny per pound on wool, one pound per ton on tallow, three pence each on hides and one halfpenny each of sheepskins. The Council was divided and the motion was not passed.

In 1866, Septimus Nash Spong designed a wharf at St Lawrence. Spong received a Queensland Government post in 1861, as clerk of works in the Colonial Architect's Office where he replaced Joseph Sherwin. Spong later moved to Rockhampton where he practiced as an architect, building and land surveyor from 1865 until 1874. As with its Canadian namesake, which has the fastest tide in the world, the basin at St Lawrence has a rapid and deep tidal surge and so was dangerous as a port. In 1873, as a cyclone and the storage of copper ore damaged the old wharf, a new wharf was established at Waverley Creek, which had better access by land and sea. Even so, the extension of the Central Western railway line to the port in Rockhampton reduced trade via St Lawrence and St Lawrence effectively ceased to be a port after 1879.

PR Gordon, the Chief Inspector of Sheep observed in 1871, that the preservation of meat had become an established industry in the Colony. WB Tooth of Clifton reported boiling down 32000 sheep. Boiling down works were situated at Burke, Baffle Creek, Dalby, Gladstone, Mackay, Redbank, Rockhampton, Townsville (see Alligator Creek meatworks), Westbrook and Yengarie. The Inspector stated that the Dalby and Westbrook Boiling Establishments reported having been obliged to discontinue operations on account of the excessive railway charges absorbing too large a share of the profits as the margin had become so small. The Inspector further reported that the during the present year, the Westbrook and Rockhampton curing establishments would be in active operation.

While there is no clear evidence as to who initially established the boiling down works by August 1893, the Chairman of the Broadsound Divisional Board, on behalf of the residents of the district wired a protest to Sir Thomas McIlwraith regarding the closing of the Customs and other government offices. The community considered that the closing of such offices would mean stagnation for the area instead of progress. It was suggested at the time that, as companies for boiling down and exporting meat and for coal mining were being initiated, the works would mean increased revenue for the district.

Two men involved with the works were TS Beatty and George Fox, who led the move to establish the factory. By September 1900, Beatty was described as one of the most enterprising men of the district, keeping the welfare of the town and district foremost in his thoughts. The meatworks was a prominent industry in the area at the time, particularly as copper mines in the area had failed, sheep were being moved west and the railway from Emerald to Clermont cut off traffic to St Lawrence. Despite difficulties such as devaluation and having little market for stock, which meant that it was almost impossible to fix a minimum price, the works were built and a price was established which had a fixed value to cattle proprietors, providing some stability in the industry. The works were described as being situated on Waverley Creek, about "three and a half miles" from St Lawrence, connected to the wharf by a tramline and with every convenience to hand for the efficient handling of stock and carcasses.

The company had a strong propriety, both in London and the Colonies. By means of their steamer Tarshaw the works kept in direct communication with Rockhampton and the southern Colonies. Upwards of 120 men were employed and the company had a view to further extending the works through the construction of machinery for treating offal. FHT Walton, late of PD Armour and Company of Chicago, was the General Manager in 1900.

Their principal product line of the meatworks was tinned meats and extracts, with other general by-products. Stockowners received equal to 12s. 6d (1.25) per hundred (refers to weight) for the same class of stock they had previously had to accept six and six (65c) and seven and six (75c) per hundred, and save, besides droving and loss condition, when immediate neighbourhood, who supply the residents with fruit, vegetables, maize, butter, etc. and the qualities of these products generally being exceptionally good. The meatworks also had freezing and chilling facilities on the spot, consequently, it was suggested that pig farming might be added to the product production.

American Clem Allcut had control of the works by the late 1890s. It appears that Allcut had taken over the preserving works at Broadsound after leaving the government service. James Pattison was in partners for some time with Clem Allcut, but eventually sold his share to Allcut. Allcut, however, faced financial troubles later and was forced to give up the works to his creditors. Soon after, he returned to the United States. The works certainly did not continue for any great length of time after Allcut left, and its closure is generally attributed to the shortage of cattle caused by the great drought of 1902.

The meatworks had some of the most modern equipment available at the time, for canned tongues and corned meat were loaded onto ships at the wharf and exported to southern markets. Local knowledge suggests that the water supply for the meatworks was pumped over a distance of more than two miles from a big lagoon on the lower portion of Waverley Plain. The pump was powered by a steam engine using an upright boiler known as a "Donkey boiler", which is still extant.

The lagoon was located so close to the coast that the tidal waters eventually forced a breach into the bank which separated the lagoon from the sea, and ruined the supply of fresh water. Later an artificial bank or levee was built to keep the salt water out. This activity may be reflected in the name of the creek in the area, which is Bund Creek - a bund being defined as an embankment or an embanked quay. It is thought this occurred after the meatworks closed down, as it is considered unlikely that during the operation of the works, the owners would not have taken steps to stop the sea breaking through into the lagoon, unless this was caused by an unusually high tide.

The meatworks preserved large quantities of meat by drying and salting brisket meat, packing it in wooden casks and then canning the rest of the meat. The preserved meat in casks was bought and used to a great extent by ships, many of which might be out of port for extended periods. The tallow and hides were also marketed. Clem Allcut during his term of ownership also manufactured beef extract.

When the low prices of cattle prevailed, stock could sometimes be bought for as low as £1 per head. All the waste meat and scraps were run into a gully close by, which is thought to have filled and emptied with the rise and fall of the tide so that all this waste was carried into the nearby stream and out to sea.

By 1897–1899, the company was listed as the Broadsound Packing Co. Ltd. The Managing Director was CH Allcutt and the Secretary was WA Forth. By 1900, the company was listed as the Broadsound Meat Company with WD Preston as the Manager and WHA Britton the company accountant. In 1905, the Broadsound Meat Co had as its Manager, J Vickers, who continued in that position until 1911. From 1912, there are no further listings for the Broadsound Meat Company.

Besides drought, further competition from other meatworks such as Lakes Creek, near Rockhampton, the Rockhampton Boiling Down and Meat Works Ltd, Nerimbera, who advertised that they were prepared to treat stock on "liberal terms", added to the difficulties faces by the meatworks at St Lawrence. With the Connors Range forming a formidable barrier to drovers with mobs of cattle, and the lack of a railway, the meatworks at St Lawrence was at a serious disadvantage.

Following its closure, machinery and any other equipment was dismantled and taken away by sea, apparently being sold, possibly to owners of other meatworks requiring the equipment. Today the former meatworks site is predominantly archaeological.

== Description ==
The remains of the former St Lawrence Meatworks and Wharf site is located on several properties off Settlement Road, approximately eight kilometres south-east of the town of St Lawrence. Despite vegetation growth, considerable evidence for site is still visible above ground.

The main site includes three boilers, two of which are located to the west of the property and a third boiler located approximately ten metres to the east of the first two boilers. Situated around two of the boilers is brick rubble remains, providing evidence for the fireboxes which once surrounded the boilers. The third boiler, to the east, does not have any brick rubble remains surrounding it, indicating that it may have been moved from its original position.

Directly to the west of the boilers is a brick lined, sunken area with remnant concrete flooring. It is approximately nine metres square. The remains of a wall rendered brick wall are located in sections around the area and rise to a height of approximately one metre. An opening is located in the remnant wall in the north-west corner of the area. Also in this section is located a metal grill. It is not clear if this grill is associated with some sort of heating element in the meatworks production line or if its purpose was more closely related to a cattle grill, and was to keep the animals within the area.

Approximately ten metres north of the brick wall and concrete floor area is the remains of another facebrick structure. This structure has three walls extant [north, south and west] and may have had at least two rooms, as the remains of what appear to be the brick base of an internal wall and a timber framed doorway, are evident. To the north of the facebrick building is located the remains of another structure with a brick base and a concrete floor area. The site has other brick, metal and timber remains scattered throughout. It is also likely that further evidence of the meatworks exist underground.

On another area of land, to the north-east of the main site, the remains of a donkey boiler and a mine shaft are extant. During the time of the meatworks, a tram ran from the site across to the main meatworks site. While no physical evidence of the tramline remains, what is apparent is an earthed, built-up area, indicating the position of the line. This is located to the west of the shaft and boiler and curves around, running south-west, disappearing before it reaches Settlement Road.

The former wharf site, incorporating timber posts, and much of the tramway, which joins the meatworks, are situated on tidal flats, forming part of the Newport Conservation Park. Other remains include further evidence of the tram line such as timber sleeper and metal remains. Also extant in the Newport Conservation Park is evidence of timber fording of Bund Creek and remains of what appears to be a corduroy road.

== Heritage listing ==
The former Meatworks and Wharf Site was listed on the Queensland Heritage Register on 23 February 2001 having satisfied the following criteria.

The place is important in demonstrating the evolution or pattern of Queensland's history.

The Former Meatworks & Wharf Site, St Lawrence is thought to be associated with the tallow works established in the area in the 1860s, the earliest establishment of the town of St Lawrence and later with the extension of the site to include meatworks and boiling down works, from c. 1893 to c. 1911. The site survives as an important illustration of early industrial development of Queensland and of the settlement of the Broadsound area in particular. The former meatworks and wharf site is significant in demonstrating early methods of addressing problems caused by the remoteness of areas used for stock raising and great distances between supplier and market in Queensland. It is further significant as the site survives as a legacy to the canning industry which lingered in the St Lawrence area when freezing was the dominant form of processing.

The place demonstrates rare, uncommon or endangered aspects of Queensland's cultural heritage.

The surviving Donkey boiler is one of few of this type known to survive in Queensland.

The place has potential to yield information that will contribute to an understanding of Queensland's history.

With further archaeological and historical research and analysis, the place has the potential to reveal important information about Queensland's history and early industrial technology.

The place has a strong or special association with a particular community or cultural group for social, cultural or spiritual reasons.

The former meatworks and wharf site is significant as a well known tourist site and continues to attract public interest, with groups of visitors being shown the area by members of the local community.

== See also ==
- List of tramways in Queensland
