= Koumala War Memorial =

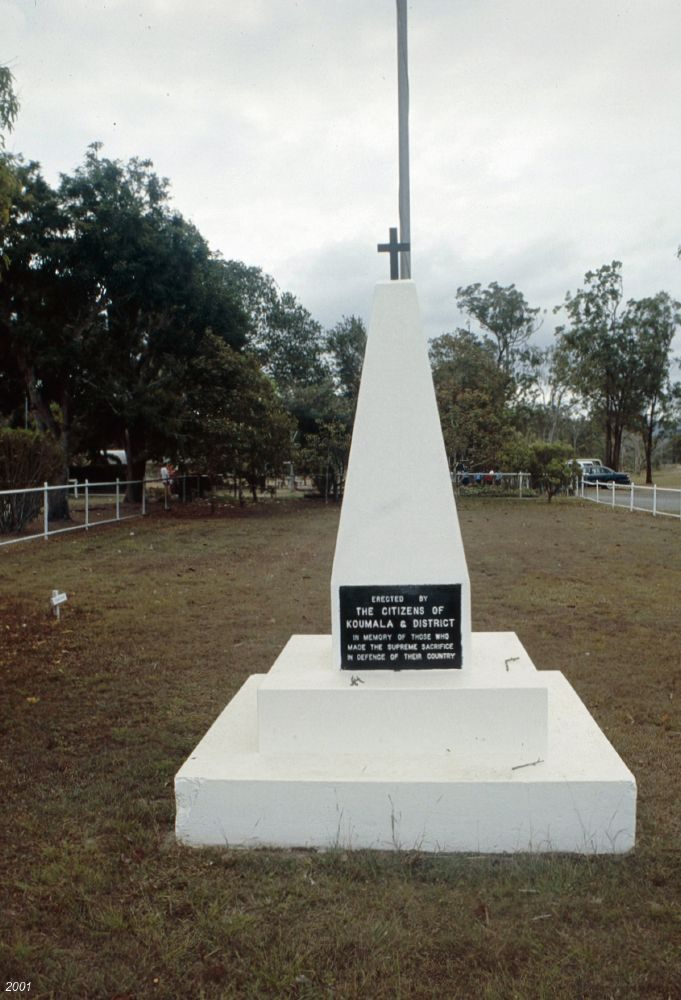
- Koumala War Memorial, 2000

- Location within Queensland Location within Australia
- 21.6073°S 149.2435°E
- Location: Mumby Street, Koumala, Mackay Region, Queensland, Australia

History
- Design period: 1940s - 1960s (post-World War II)
- Built: 1959

Queensland Heritage Register
- Official name: Koumala War Memorial
- Type: state heritage (landscape, built)
- Designated: 27 August 1999
- Reference no.: 601292
- Significant period: 1959- (social); 1959 (historical, fabric)
- Significant components: plaque, memorial - obelisk, flagpole/flagstaff, fence/wall - perimeter

Koumala War Memorial is a heritage-listed memorial at Mumby Street, Koumala, Mackay Region, Queensland, Australia. It was built in 1959. It was added to the Queensland Heritage Register on 27 August 1999.

== History ==
The Koumala War Memorial was erected in 1959. The dedication date of the memorial is Friday 18 April 1958. Funds for the memorial were raised by public subscription, arranged by the Koumala sub-branch of the RSL. The memorial was erected in honour of those who served in all wars and particularly honours the six local men who made the supreme sacrifice in honour of their country during the Second World War.

Six small trees have been planted by the school children with each tree representative of one of the six men. Temporary plaques displaying the names were placed beside each tree with the intention to replace them with more permanent plaques at some later stage.

== Description ==
The Koumala War Memorial is situated in a reserve next to the Koumala State School, facing Bull Street. The reserve is surrounded by a low chain wire fence with white painted metal frames. The setting in which the memorial is located is barren apart from new plantings of "Ned Kelly" Grevilleas, and a flagpole which stands directly behind the memorial.

The memorial is constructed of white painted concrete and comprises a double stepped base from which rises an obelisk on a square plinth. The front face of the plinth features a plaque with a commemorative statement from the citizens of the Koumala district. The obelisk is surmounted by a small Latin cross.

Inscriptions on the plaques on the memorial read as follows:

Front Inscription

[ Names ]

Plaque :

In Memory Of

Those Who Gave Their

Lives in Defence

Of Our Country

At the going down of the sun

and in the morning

We will remember them

Their Name Liveth For Evermore

Dedicated 2006

[ Names ]

Plaque :

Erected By

THE CITIZENS OF

KOUMALA & DISTRICT

In Memory of Those Who

Made The Supreme Sacrifice

In Defence of Their Country.

== Heritage listing ==
Koumala War Memorial was listed on the Queensland Heritage Register on 27 August 1999 having satisfied the following criteria.

The place is important in demonstrating the evolution or pattern of Queensland's history.

War Memorials are important in demonstrating the pattern of Queensland's history as they are representative of a recurrent theme that involved most communities throughout the state. They provide evidence of an era of widespread Australian patriotism and nationalism, particularly during and following the First World War.

The place is important in demonstrating the principal characteristics of a particular class of cultural places.

The memorial at Koumala demonstrates the principal characteristics of a commemorative structure erected as an enduring record of a major historical event. This is achieved through the appropriate use of various elements such as the cairn and commemorative plaque.

The place has a strong or special association with a particular community or cultural group for social, cultural or spiritual reasons.

It has a strong and continuing association with the community as evidence of the impact of a major historic event and as the focal point for the remembrance of that event.
