= St Lawrence Police Station =

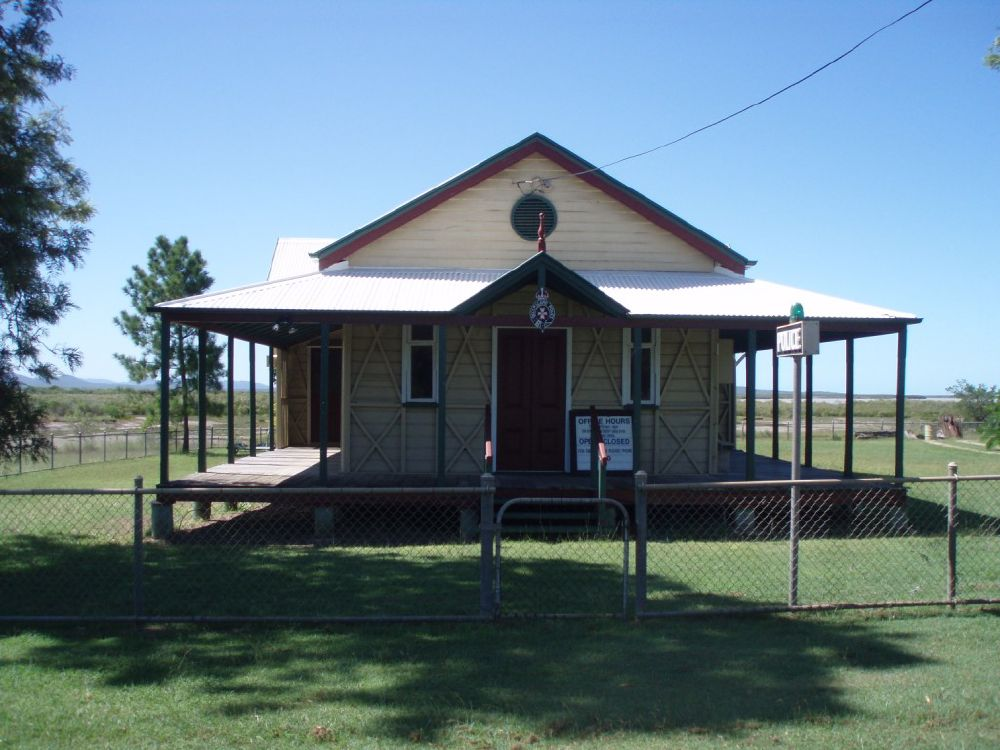
- St Lawrence Police Station, 2009

- Location within Queensland Location within Australia
- 22.344°S 149.5284°E
- Location: Macartney Street, St Lawrence, Isaac Region, Queensland, Australia

History
- Design period: 1870s–1890s (late 19th century)
- Built: 1878–1934

Queensland Heritage Register
- Official name: Police Station and former Courthouse and Cell Block
- Type: state heritage (built)
- Designated: 24 November 2000
- Reference no.: 601152
- Significant period: 1870s–1880s (historical); 1878–1880s (fabric); 1878–ongoing (social)
- Significant components: cell block, police station, court house

St Lawrence Police Station is a heritage-listed police station and former courthouse at Macartney Street, St Lawrence, Isaac Region, Queensland, Australia. It was built from 1878 to 1934. It is also known as former St Lawrence Courthouse and Cell Block. It was added to the Queensland Heritage Register on 24 November 2000.

== History ==
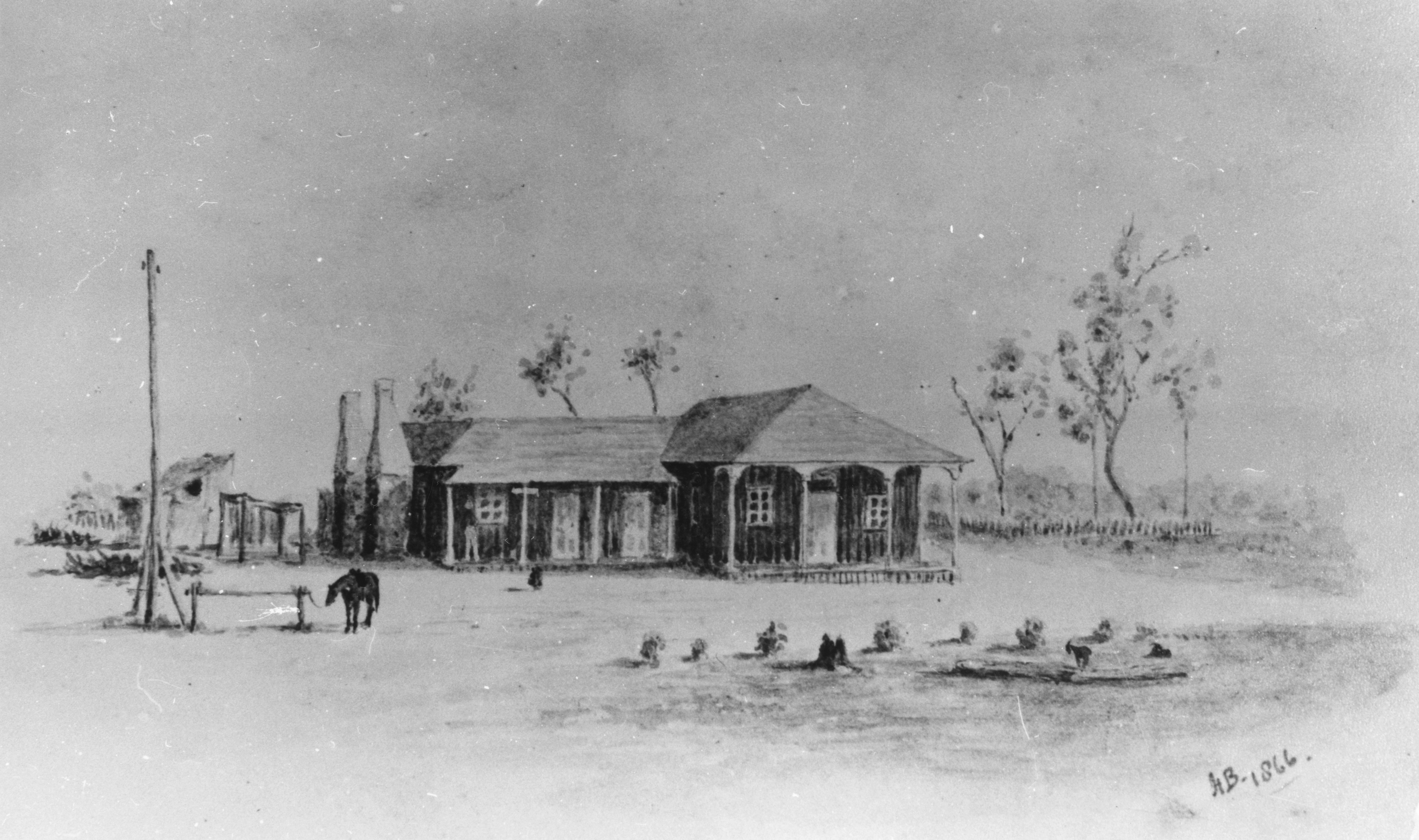
Sketch of the first St Lawrence Courthouse and Post Office, 1866

The St Lawrence police station and courthouse, constructed in 1878, the second to be built on the site and the cell block, constructed by 1880, are situated in a prominent position overlooking the St Lawrence Creek, located on the site of a government reserve which has served the community as part of the justice system since 1863. Additions to the police station and former courthouse in 1934 included the enclosing of verandah in the north-west corner to build a bathroom. Other additions included the construction of earth closets and a cell block in the grounds. The buildings have had numerous repairs, including painting and restumping and minor renovations over the years.

European settlement began in the St Lawrence area by 1860, when John Arthur Macartney formed Waverley Station. Macartney, an Irish solicitor, had made his fortune on the Victorian gold fields. The St Lawrence area had a strong connection with the pastoral industry in the 19th century. McCartney took up land at the head of Broadsound and Waverley in 1860 and used the banks of the St Lawrence Creek to land his supplies. Later that year a boiling down works for tallow was established. In 1861 the Rockhampton Port Master recommended the site for a port, and government buildings were soon constructed. These included a Telegraph Office, Police Station and Courthouse. Macartney was the first magistrate at the courthouse.

During the first years of settlement in what was later to become the State of Queensland, the police system was executed through the duties of a Police Magistrate. However, this proved to be inadequate and following the appointment of the first Governor of Queensland, Governor Bowen, in 1859, an organised force was established by appointing an Inspector General to be in charge of both ordinary and Native Police. In 1863 and 1864, the police system again changed form, following the appointment of the first Commissioner of Police, David Thompson Seymour. He introduced a new system based on the Victorian model comprising Inspectors, Sub-Inspectors, Sergeants, Constables and a Detective Force. In ensuing years, the structure of the Force underwent a number of additional modifications and by 1924 Queensland had the highest state ratio of policemen to residents in Australia, with one officer to every 725 persons.

By 1863 a government reserve of four acres had been set aside in St Lawrence in the north-west corner of the surveyed area, to the south of the St Lawrence Creek. This reserve was titled "Custom House". The first courthouse in St Lawrence, a single storey slab building with a shingle roof was constructed by 1866. In 1869 there were two government buildings in the town, a "public house", a store and "8 or 9 huts". This courthouse was repaired following cyclones in 1875 and 1877. By 1878, a new, timber building with a shingle roof was commenced by contractor Thomas Watson. It was completed by the end of 1878 for a cost of £520/18. The design, prepared by the Office of the Government Architect, was similar to the Port Douglas courthouse, constructed in 1879.

By June 1880, the Police Inspector reported that the "...Barracks consist of the old Court House and the original Barracks and Cells...". The former portion was occupied by the Sergeant and the latter by the Constable. At this time, there were two new cells under construction. The Inspector of Police reported that the Barracks were in an unsatisfactory state, the result of "...keeping a number of pigs, goats and poultry on the premises". By October 1881, in compliance with the Inspector's instructions, William Tagg's premises at St Lawrence were rented to serve as a police barracks for twelve months at a cost of £25 per annum. By September 1882, the Constable at St Lawrence requested instructions regarding a renewal of rental terms. In October 1882, Tagg offered to sell the premises to the police, however, following an inspection, it was decided to erect a new police barracks on the site of the reserve, which were occupied by the courthouse, post and telegraph office and sergeants quarters. The Constable in Charge proposed that the slabs from the buildings to be pulled down to make way for the new police barracks, not be sold off, but reused to erect stables, a saddle room, a cart shed and other out offices.

In January 1914, Herbert Payne was awarded the tender to remove eight decayed stumps from under the courthouse and replace them with solid blocks. The decayed floor boards at the "bottom front verandah" were also to be replaced and the building painted. The cost totalled £45.

In January 1919, the Commissioner of Railways informed the Police Department that a camp was to be established at St Lawrence for the construction of the North Coast Railway. The Commissioner thought that the town did not have a police presence; however, he was informed that there were two constables stationed at St Lawrence.

In 1921, it was proposed to build new accommodation for the single constable, as the old slab quarters, constructed c. 1870, were considered uninhabitable. Funding was not granted for this, and so the following year, the constable was directed to use one of the rooms at the rear of the courthouse. The Constable in Charge, who was also Acting Clerk of Petty Sessions, was already using the building for clerical work and "indoor" police work. A toilet for prisoners was added to the rear verandah in 1935 when new stables and forage room was also built. The single constable's quarters was pulled down in 1923 and the slabs used to construct a harness room.

The arrival of the North Coast railway line in 1921 provided an important economic boost to the area, as well as a transport link. St Lawrence was a meal stop for rail passengers and the refreshments rooms at one time employed 22 women. Drivers and staff also changed at St Lawrence. The town itself reached its peak in the late 1940s with a population of 3000.

The police barracks was demolished in the late 1980s and a new building was constructed. The railway station closed in 1992 and the last court was held in St Lawrence in that year. The police station and former courthouse and the cell block continue to be used by the police department.

== Description ==
Located in the south-west corner of the site, the St Lawrence Police Station and former Courthouse is a single story, "T-shaped" timber building, with an exterior cross-braced frame supported on low stumps. The gable roof is clad with corrugated iron. The building is surrounded on the south, west and east by a verandah with timber posts, under a separate roof, clad with corrugated iron. The verandah to the north (rear) of the building, has been partially enclosed on the north-western side, to accommodate toilet facilities. This section of the building has a skillion roof clad with corrugated iron. This enclosure is part of the 1934 additions. The verandah has also been partially enclosed, with vertically jointed timber, on the north-eastern side to accommodate toilet facilities. This enclosure is later in date, and the framework is clad with chamferboards.

A set of timber stairs lead to the paired, panelled, timber doors. The entrance is centrally located under a gabled roof with a decorative timber finial. A circular ventilator is located high in the southern facade. Narrow windows operating on pivots are located on either side of the entrance door and along the western and eastern sides of the building. Forming part of the transverse section of the building, on the eastern side, is located a set of long, rectangular casement windows, protected by a sunhood with timber brackets, clad with corrugated iron. A timber door at the northern end of the verandah on the eastern side, leads to the office. Internally, the entrance doors lead to the former courtroom. The room is horizontally lined with timber on the western, eastern and southern side of the room. The northern side is vertically lined with timber. The central section of the timber ceiling is flat and the sides and ends are angled. A vent with decorative fretwork is located in the ceiling. The Magistrate's bench is located at the northern end of the room. Timber doors are located on either side of the bench. These lead into two rooms forming the transverse section of the "T". One leads to the office and the second to the interview room. Court records and the original straitjacket, issued for the restraint of violent prisoners, are located in storage in the former courtroom.

The office, located at the northern end of the building, is lined with timber on the western and eastern and southern sides and with chamferboards on the northern side. A door in the northern wall leads to a small office which forms part of the enclosed rear (northern) verandah. A second door leads to the open verandah. A timber door at the western end of the rear verandah leads to a small office, forming part of the original section of the building, which is used as an interview room. This room is lined with timber and there is a breezeway located in the eastern wall. A timber, panelled door in the southern wall opens to the former courtroom.

The cell block, a single storey timber building, set on low timber stumps, with a hipped roof clad with corrugated galvanised iron, is located almost in the centre of the property, to the north-east of the police station and former courthouse. On the eastern side of the cell, timber stairs lead to the verandah and cell doors. Part of the verandah, at the northern end, has been enclosed to accommodate shower facilities. Apart from a doorway, the verandah is surrounded by a metal grill. Rectangular openings with metal grills and mesh wire are located high in each elevation. Two cells are located within the block, at the north and south ends of the building, each measuring a few metres square. In both blocks, to one corner, is located a porcelain toilet set in concrete. The cells are accessed via a heavy, timber door with iron hinges and bolts, and a square opening with an iron opening and door latch.

An incinerator with the words "CP ENG MK1" embossed on the body is located to the north of the police station and former courthouse building. Two mango trees are located in the north-west corner of the property. A number of other mature trees and plantings are located around the site. The property is surrounded by a modern chain wire fence.

== Heritage listing ==
Police Station and former Courthouse and Cell Block was listed on the Queensland Heritage Register on 24 November 2000 having satisfied the following criteria.

The place is important in demonstrating the evolution or pattern of Queensland's history.

Forming part of the old town of St Lawrence, the site of the St Lawrence police station and former courthouse (1878) and cell block, constructed by 1880, is significant as it reflects the history and development of St Lawrence and the surrounding area and its role as a regional judicial precinct in the early years following Separation.

The place demonstrates rare, uncommon or endangered aspects of Queensland's cultural heritage.

Few early timber police station and courthouse buildings survive and the St Lawrence police station and courthouse building is significant for its rarity as one of the earliest, intact, extant examples of this type of building.

The place is important in demonstrating the principal characteristics of a particular class of cultural places.

As a single-storey, timber, government building, with drawings prepared by the Office of the Colonial Architect, the St Lawrence police station and former courthouse is significant as an example of a typical type of design and construction.

The cell block is significant as an extant example of the typical timber cell blocks constructed by the Department of Public Works in the late 19th century.

The place is important because of its aesthetic significance.

The St Lawrence police station and former courthouse has aesthetic significance due to the simplicity and symmetry of design of the building, and for its contribution to the MaCartney Street streetscape and the St Lawrence townscape.

The place has a special association with the life or work of a particular person, group or organisation of importance in Queensland's history.

The site of a police reserve since 1863, the St Lawrence police station and former courthouse is significant for its long association with law and order and the dispensing of justice in the area. The building was the focus for a wide range of community services and this, together with the tradition of constables-in-charge, ensured that the St Lawrence police station and former courthouse provided an important community focus in the town.
