= Clarke Creek, Queensland =

Clarke Creek
- Suburb
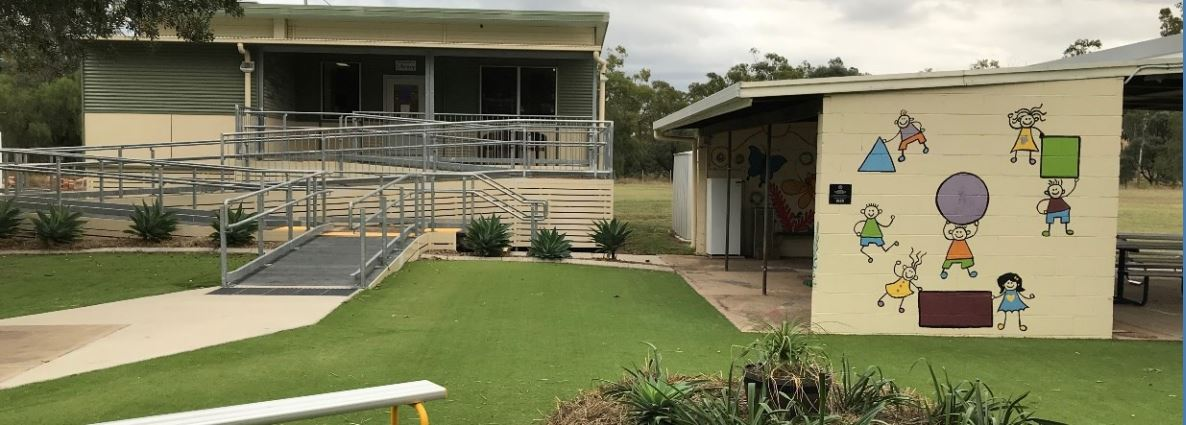
- Clarke Creek State School, 2021

- Interactive map of Clarke Creek
- Coordinates: 22.725°S 149.3138°E
- Country: Australia
- State: Queensland
- LGA: Isaac Region
- Location: 85.8 km (53.3 mi) ENE of Middlemount; 189 km (117 mi) NW of Rockhampton; 196 km (122 mi) S of Mackay; 209 km (130 mi) SE of Moranbah; 830 km (520 mi) NNW of Brisbane

Government
  - State electorate: Mirani
  - Federal division: Capricornia

Area
  - Total: 626.7 km^{2} (242.0 sq mi)

Population
  - Total: 32 (2021 census)
  - Density: 0.0511/km^{2} (0.1322/sq mi)
- Time zone: UTC+10:00 (AEST)
- Postcode: 4705
Suburbs around Clarke Creek
May Downs	Lotus Creek	St Lawrence
May Downs	Clarke Creek	Ogmore
Mackenzie River	Mackenzie	Mount Gardiner

Clarke Creek is a rural locality in the Isaac Region, Queensland, Australia. It is situated between Mackay and Rockhampton on the Old Bruce Highway. In the 2021 census, Clarke Creek had a population of 32 people.

== Geography ==
The Marlborough–Sarina Road runs through from south to north.

== History ==
Clarke Creek State School opened on 17 May 1971.

== Demographics ==
In the 2011 census, Clarke Creek was counted within the area of Valkyrie which had a combined population of 307.

In the 2016 census, Clarke Creek had a population of 30 people.

In the 2021 census, Clarke Creek had a population of 32 people.

== Economy ==
Despite the name, Clarke Creek Wind Farm is located in neighbouring Mount Gardiner.

== Education ==
Clarke Creek State School is a government primary (Prep-6) school for boys and girls at 44 May Downs Road (22.6365°S 149.2529°E). In 2018, the school had an enrolment of 15 students with 3 teachers (2 full-time equivalent) and 6 non-teaching staff (2 full-time equivalent). The school has a tennis court, swimming pool, oval, playground facilities and amenities.

There are no secondary schools in Clarke Creek nor nearby. Distance education and boarding school are the alternatives.

== Attractions ==
Clarke Creek holds an annual campdrafting competition with people coming from across Queensland to participate. The campdrafting ground is located next to the school.
