= Valkyrie, Queensland =

Valkyrie
- Suburb
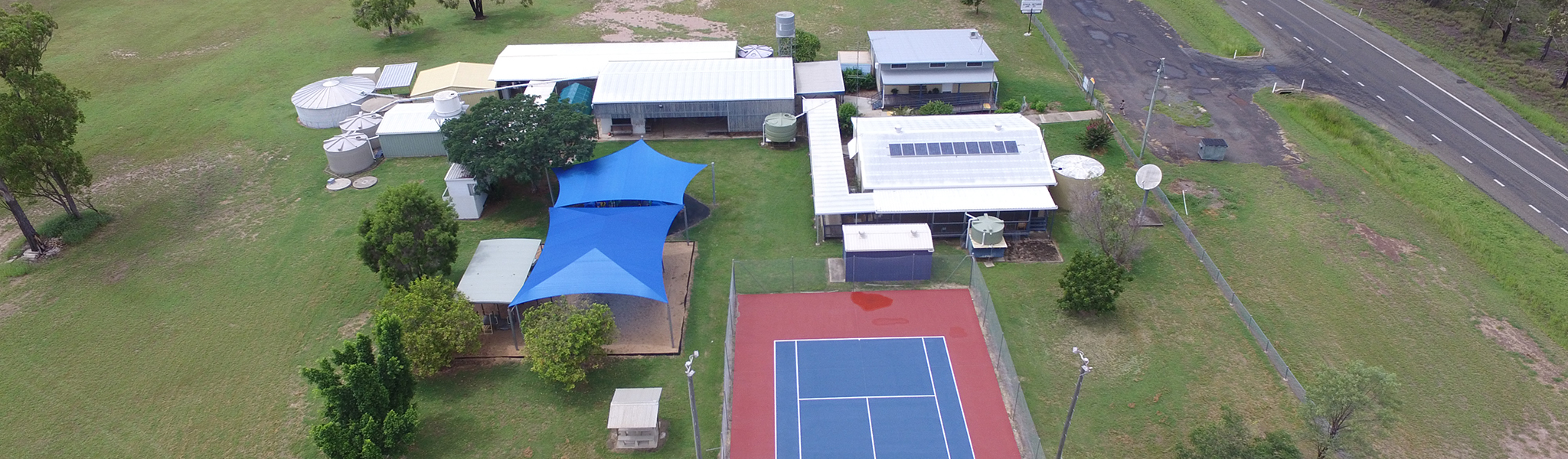
- Valkyrie State School, 2025

- Interactive map of Valkyrie
- Coordinates: 22.1938°S 148.6649°E
- Country: Australia
- State: Queensland
- LGA: Isaac Region
- Location: 93.9 km (58.3 mi) E of Moranbah; 99.2 km (61.6 mi) NNE of Dysart; 146 km (91 mi) SW of Mackay; 943 km (586 mi) NNW of Brisbane

Government
  - State electorates: Burdekin; Mirani
  - Federal division: Capricornia

Area
  - Total: 2,595.4 km^{2} (1,002.1 sq mi)

Population
  - Total: 71 (2021 census)
  - Density: 0.02736/km^{2} (0.0709/sq mi)
- Time zone: UTC+10:00 (AEST)
- Postcode: 4742
Suburbs around Valkyrie
Coppabella	Oxford	Oxford
Dysart	Valkyrie	Lotus Creek
Dysart	May Downs	May Downs

Valkyrie is a rural locality in the Isaac Region, Queensland, Australia. In the 2021 census, Valkyrie had a population of 71 people.

== Geography ==
The Isaac River passes through the locality forming part of the locality's south-western boundary. The Fitzroy Developmental Road passes through the locality from north to south.

The Duania open-cut coal mine is in the western part of the locality and is serviced by the Goonyella railway line. However, the land use of Valkyrie is predominantly cattle grazing.

== History ==
Valkyrie State School opened on 9 January 1974.

In 2011, there was a proposal to develop the Codrilla coal mine on a site approximately 800 metres from the school. The proposal included the relocation of the school and its teacher's residence to a new location to avoid any environmental impacts from the mine. As of 2017, the mine proposal and school relocation have not yet occurred.

== Demographics ==
In the 2016 census, Valkyrie had a population of 122 people.

In the 2021 census, Valkyrie had a population of 71 people.

== Education ==
Valkyrie State School is a government primary (Early Childhood to Year 6) school for boys and girls at 43092 Fitzroy Developmental Road (22.0594°S 148.5794°E). In 2016, the school had an enrolment of 19 students with 2 teachers and 6 non-teaching staff (2 full-time equivalent). In 2018, the school had an enrolment of 22 students with 3 teachers (2 full-time equivalent) and 5 non-teaching staff (2 full-time equivalent).

There are no secondary schools in Valkyrie. The nearest government secondary schools are Dysart State High School in neighbouring Dysart to the south-west and Moranbah State High School in Moranbah to the west. However, most of Valkyrie would be too distant from these schools for a daily commute; the alternatives are distance education and boarding school.

== School water supply issue ==
Valkyrie State School has become known for its ongoing struggle in attempting to obtain a permanent water supply since opening in 1974.

In 2015, a student suffered a broken arm after falling on the dry surface of the school's unwatered oval. Students were subsequently banned from playing on the oval to prevent similar incidents from occurring. Since June 2020, the school has been relying on a mining company Peabody Energy to transport potable water to supplement the school's rainwater tanks free of charge. The school's rainwater tanks ran out of water in May 2021.

In 2021, the school was banned by the state government from accepting donated water from any company apart from its own commercial business unit QBuild. The Parents & Citizens' Association, the Isolated Children's Parent's Association and local MP Dale Last have all criticised the state government's handling of the issue. The government was also criticised by the P&C for not allocating any money in the 2021 state budget to address the lack of water supply at Valkyrie State School, despite funding ten new schools in South East Queensland, and allocating money for new infrastructure at Parkhurst State School.

According to the Department of Education, an additional three new water tanks with ultraviolet filtration would be installed at the school in 2021. However, the P&C said they would prefer a permanent water source and proposed that the school either be connected to the nearest pipeline or have a nearby dam rehabilitated so water could be pumped to the school from there.
