= Marlborough, Queensland =

Marlborough
- Town
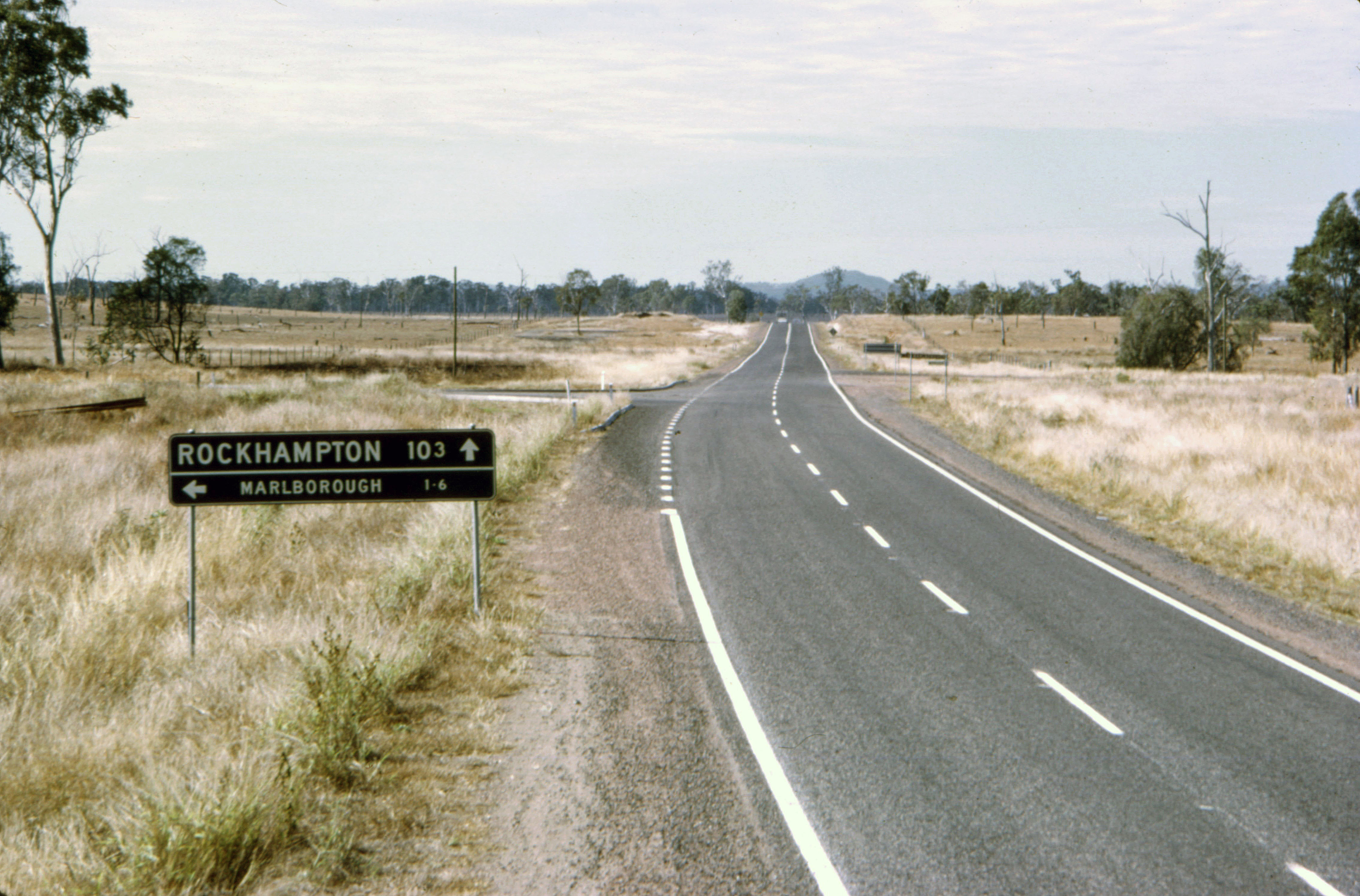
- Turn off to the town of Marlborough from the Bruce Highway, 1970s

- Interactive map of Marlborough
- Coordinates: 22.8138°S 149.8919°E
- Country: Australia
- State: Queensland
- LGA: Shire of Livingstone
- Location: 106 km (66 mi) NE of Rockhampton; 138 km (86 mi) NE of Yeppoon; 720 km (450 mi) NNW of Brisbane

Government
  - State electorate: Mirani
  - Federal division: Capricornia

Area
  - Total: 1,388.9 km^{2} (536.3 sq mi)

Population
  - Total: 154 (2021 census)
  - Density: 0.1109/km^{2} (0.2872/sq mi)
- Time zone: UTC+10:00 (AEST)
- Postcode: 4705
Localities around Marlborough
Ogmore	Coral Sea	Stanage
Mount Gardiner	Marlborough	Kunwarara
Mount Gardiner	Glenroy	Canoona

Marlborough is a rural town and coastal locality in the Livingstone Shire, Queensland, Australia. In the 2021 census, the locality of Marlborough had a population of 154 people.

== Geography ==
The town lies on the Bruce Highway, 106 kilometres (66 mi) north west of the city of Rockhampton. The town is a small service centre for the surrounding area, and one of a number of fuelling points on an otherwise isolated stretch of highway.

To the south lies the Kunwarara Magnesite mine, which works one of the world's largest supplies of the mineral.

Marlborough is famous for producing the world's finest chrysoprase, a semi-precious gem once coveted by Alexander the Great and Cleopatra. The small but high-grade deposit is located about 20 kilometres (12 mi) south-south-west of the township and is universally regarded as the most valuable find in the world.

The Bruce Highway passes through the locality, entering from the east (Kunwarara) and exiting to the north-west (Ogmore), bypassing the town approx 1 kilometre (0.62 mi) to the west. The North Coast railway line also passes through the locality, running roughly parallel to the east of the highway, but does pass through the town, which is served by Marlborough railway station (22.8140°S 149.8893°E).

The Marlborough–Sarina Road exits to the west.

== History ==
Marlborough was established as a squatting pastoral run in 1857 by Dan Connor. The name is probably connected with the First Duke of Marlborough (1650-1722), a British army commander.

The post office at Marlborough opened on 1 January 1861. The first town allotments were sold in 1862. Marlborough was the location of a Native Police barracks from 1865 to 1876. The barracks were located at Barrack Creek on the northwest outskirts of the town.

Marlborough Railway Provisional School opened on 26 July 1917. On 26 April 1919 it was renamed Koonama Provisional School. On 18 October 1920 it became Koonama State School. On 11 September 1925 it was renamed Marlborough State School.

On 24 July 2000, five people were killed when the Rockhampton-based Capricorn Helicopter Rescue Service helicopter crashed in a paddock at Marlborough while attempting to land in thick fog. Following the tragedy, the community of Marlborough raised enough money to establish a permanent helipad in the town in an attempt to prevent a similar tragedy from occurring in the future.

Marlborough is within the local government area of Shire of Livingstone, but, between 2008 and 2013, it was within the Rockhampton Region.

== Demographics ==
In the 2016 census, the locality of Marlborough had a population of 149 people.

In the 2021 census, the locality of Marlborough had a population of 154 people.

== Education ==
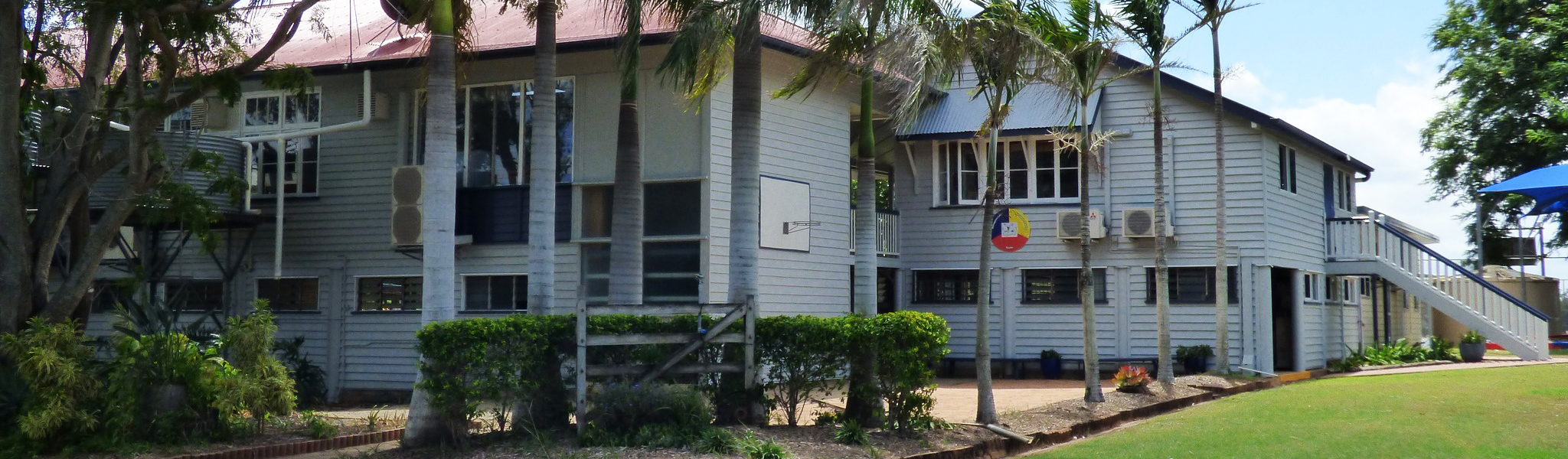
Marlborough State School, 2025

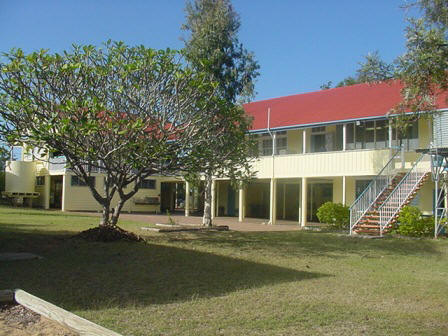
Marlborough State School (back), 2021

Marlborough State School is a government primary (Early Childhood-6) school for boys and girls at 79 Magog Road (22.8118°S 149.8950°E). In 2018, the school had an enrolment of 34 students with 5 teachers (3 full-time equivalent) and 6 non-teaching staff (3 full-time equivalent). The school competes against other schools in the area such as Clarke Creek State School, Milman State School and School of Distance Education. They compete in swimming and athletic carnivals which Marlborough normally hosts, having a 16-metre pool and a grassy oval.

There are no secondary schools in Marlborough. The nearest government secondary school is Glenmore State High School in Kawana, Rockhampton, over 100 kilometres (62 mi) away. Distance education and boarding schools would be the alternatives.

== Amenities ==
Livingstone Shire Council operates a weekly library service at Marlborough. It is located at 15 Milman Street (22.8129°S 149.8916°E) in the Marlborough Historical Museum building.

All Saints Anglican Church is at 27 Milman Street (22.8133°S 149.8930°E). It is part of the Parish of North Rockhampton (also known as the All Saints Anglican Community) within the Anglican Church of Central Queensland.

== Attractions ==
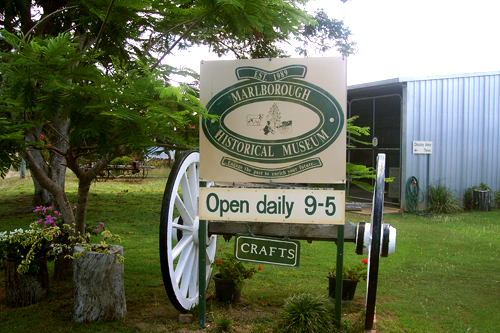
Marlborough Historical Museum

Marlborough Historical Museum is at 15 Milman Street (22.8128°S 149.8915°E). It collects and presents the natural and social heritage of Marlborough.
