= May Downs, Queensland =

May Downs
- Suburb
- Interactive map of May Downs
- Coordinates: 22.6230°S 148.9261°E
- Country: Australia
- State: Queensland
- LGA: Isaac Region
- Location: 45 km (28 mi) NE of Middlemount; 185 km (115 mi) SE of Moranbah; 239 km (149 mi) NW of Rockhampton; 853 km (530 mi) NNW of Brisbane

Government
  - State electorates: Burdekin; Mirani
  - Federal division: Capricornia

Area
  - Total: 1,678.6 km^{2} (648.1 sq mi)

Population
  - Total: 93 (2021 census)
  - Density: 0.05540/km^{2} (0.1435/sq mi)
- Postcode: 4746
Suburbs around May Downs
Dysart	Valkyrie	Lotus Creek
Dysart	May Downs	Clarke Creek
Middlemount	Mackenzie River	Mackenzie River

May Downs is a rural locality in the Isaac Region, Queensland, Australia. In the 2021 census, May Downs had a population of 93 people.

== Geography ==
The Fitzroy Developmental Road forms the western boundary of the locality while the eastern boundary loosely follows the Isaac River. The land use is predominantly cattle grazing.

== Demographics ==
In the 2016 census, May Downs had a population of 96 people.

In the 2021 census, May Downs had a population of 93 people.

== Education ==
There are no schools in May Downs. The nearest government primary schools are Dysart State School in neighbouring Dysart to the west, Middlemount Community School in neighbouring Middlemount to the south-west, and Clarke Creek State School in neighbouring Clarke Creek to the east. The nearest government secondary schools are Dysart State School and Middlemount Community School (both to Year 12). However, some parts of May Downs are too distant from these secondary schools for a daily commute; the alternatives are distance education and boarding school.
