= Ogmore, Queensland =

Ogmore
- Town
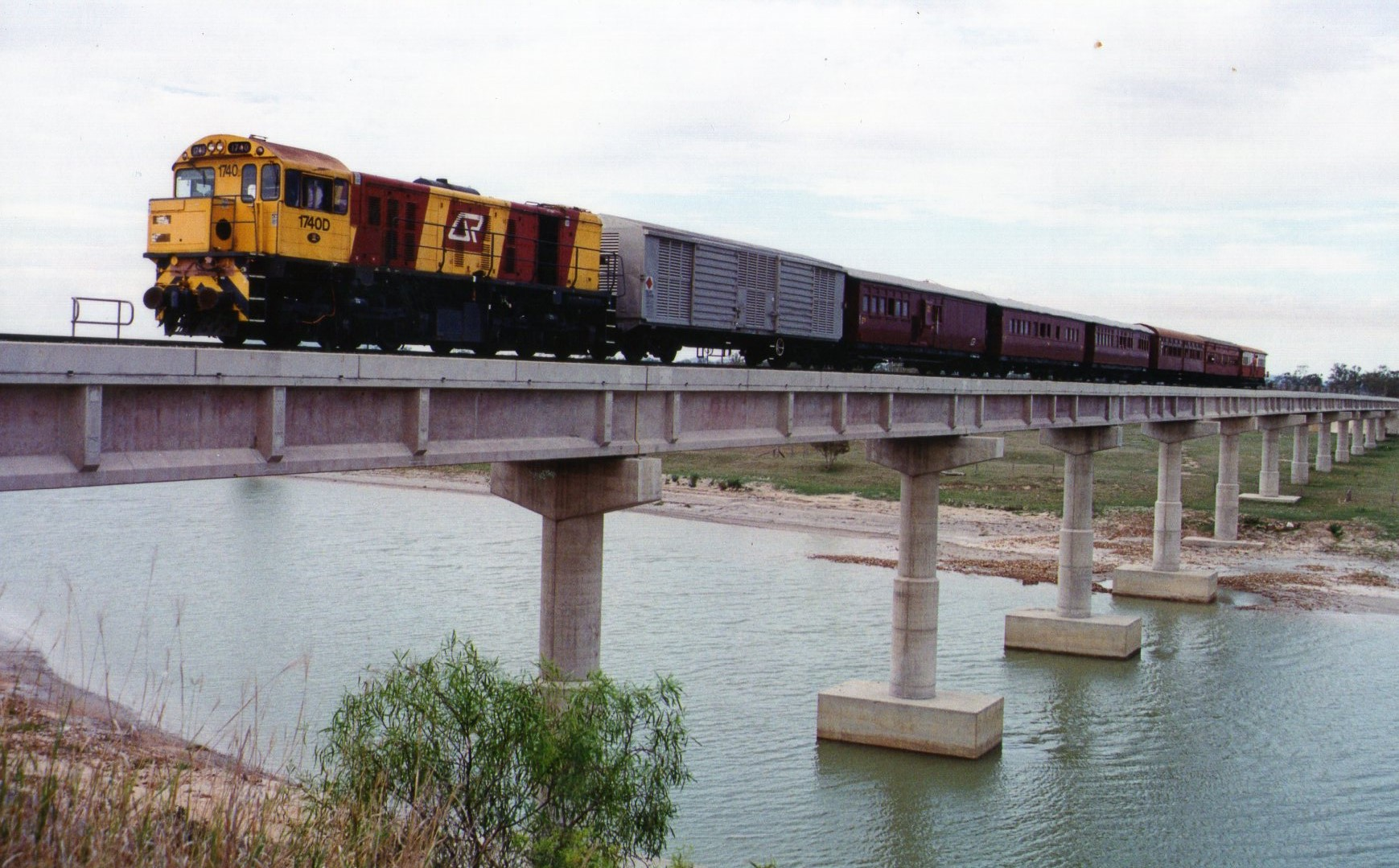
- Queensland Rail locomotive on the North Coast line crossing the Styx River from Ogmore to St Lawrence, circa 1991

- Interactive map of Ogmore
- Coordinates: 22.6208°S 149.6588°E
- Country: Australia
- State: Queensland
- LGA: Shire of Livingstone
- Location: 48.4 km (30.1 mi) NW of Marlborough; 154 km (96 mi) NW of Rockhampton; 178 km (111 mi) NW of Yeppoon; 768 km (477 mi) NNW of Brisbane

Government
  - State electorate: Mirani
  - Federal division: Capricornia

Area
  - Total: 1,424.0 km^{2} (549.8 sq mi)

Population
  - Total: 72 (2021 census)
  - Density: 0.0506/km^{2} (0.1310/sq mi)
- Time zone: UTC+10:00 (AEST)
- Postcode: 4706
Localities around Ogmore
St Lawrence	Coral Sea	Stanage
Clarke Creek	Ogmore	Marlborough
Mount Gardiner	Marlborough	Marlborough

Ogmore is a rural town and coastal locality in the Livingstone Shire, Queensland, Australia. In the 2021 census, the locality of Ogmore had a population of 72 people.

== Geography ==
The north-eastern boundary of the locality is Broad Sound with the Styx River (also known as Tooloombah Creek) flowing through Ogmore into the sound.

The Bruce Highway passes from south to north through the locality, but passes to the west of the town.

The North Coast railway line also passes from south to north through the locality to the east of the highway and passes through the town. The locality is served by a number of railway stations (from north to south):

- Styx railway station, now abandoned (22.5924°S 149.6354°E)
- Ogmore railway station, serving the town (22.6186°S 149.6574°E)
- Bowman railway station, now abandoned (22.6506°S 149.6801°E)
- Strathmuir railway station, now abandoned (22.7071°S 149.7327°E)
- Kooltandra railway station (22.7275°S 149.7585°E)

The town of Ogmore is located on the east bank of Styx River slightly north of the centre of the locality. There are also a number of neighbourhoods in the locality:

- Bowman (22.65°S 149.6833°E)
- Strathmuir (22.7°S 149.7333°E)
- Styx, in a pocket of the Styx River north-west of the town of Ogmore (22.6°S 149.6333°E)
- Tooloombah, an abandoned town (22.7056°S 149.5677°E)

The locality has the following mountains and a mountain pass:

- Bald Hills (22.4244°S 149.8151°E) 69 metres (226 ft)
- Blacktop (22.4571°S 149.8498°E) 84 metres (276 ft)
- Cliff Peak (22.4737°S 149.8349°E) 305 metres (1,001 ft)
- Fort St John (22.8040°S 149.5692°E)
- Gilnorchie Peak (22.7140°S 149.4862°E) 220 metres (720 ft)
- Langdale Hill (22.7403°S 149.5450°E)
- Mount Bison (22.7519°S 149.6222°E) 260 metres (850 ft)
- Mount Brunswick (22.6853°S 149.6073°E) 165 metres (541 ft)
- Mount Lorne (22.6839°S 149.4069°E) 546 metres (1,791 ft)
- Mount Mamelon (22.7222°S 149.6163°E) 158 metres (518 ft)
- Mount Michael (22.6723°S 149.3877°E) 562 metres (1,844 ft)
- Mount Phillip (22.5250°S 149.8214°E) 393 metres (1,289 ft)
- Mount Sarsfield (22.6781°S 149.4431°E) 502 metres (1,647 ft)
- Mount Wellington (22.6008°S 149.8980°E) 528 metres (1,732 ft)
- Rocky Peak (22.7013°S 149.4320°E) 460 metres (1,510 ft)
- The Sisters (22.6545°S 149.5964°E)
- Cattle Gap, a mountain pass (22.5789°S 149.8540°E)

== History ==
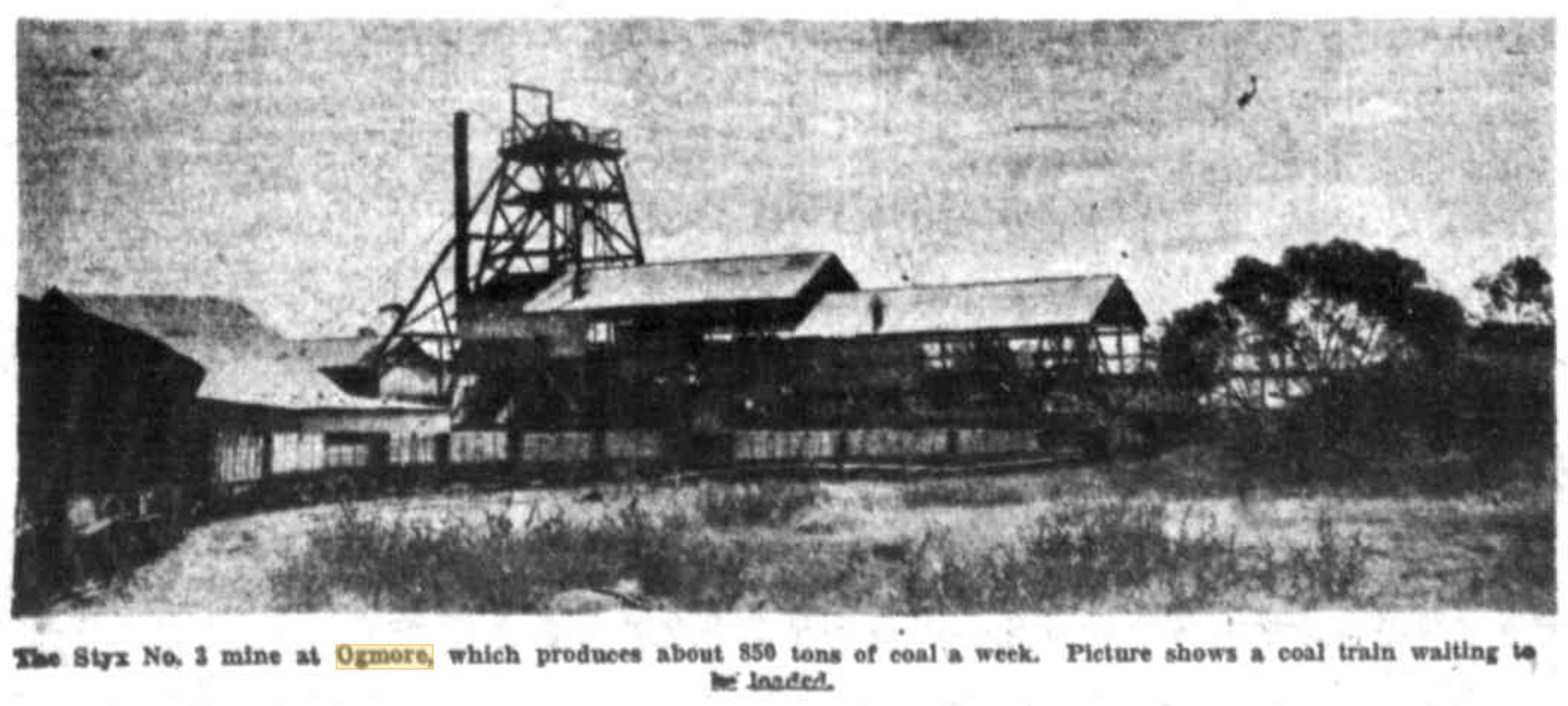
Styx No. 3 Mine at Ogmore, 1949

Ogmore was originally known as Harley, taking its name from its railway station. However, to avoid confusion with Hartley in New South Wales, on 20 January 1933 it was renamed Ogmore after the coal-mining town and river in Glamorganshire, Wales.

The neighbourhood of Bowman takes its name from the Bowman railway station, which was named by the Queensland Railways Department on 26 October 1923 after politician David Bowman.

The name Styx is a reference to the River Styx which separates the living from the dead in Greek mythology.The Styx railway station was named on 4 January 1918 by the Queensland Railways Department, but presumably refers to the river in this locality, which was already named at that time.

Styx No 3 coal mine opened near Ogmore in 1924.

Styx Coal Mine Provisional School opened on 3 May 1921. It operated as a part-time school in conjunction with the Styx River Provisional School (meaning they shared a single teacher) until it closed on 11 November 1921. On 22 May 1922, it reopened at a new location but still called Styx Coal Mine Provisional School. On 8 May 1923, it reopened as Bowman State School. It closed in 1926.

Styx River Provisional School opened on 7 October 1919 and closed on 12 Nov 1920. It reopened on 4 July 1921 and operated as a half-time school with Styx Coal Mine Provisional School until 11 November 1921. On 8 May 1923 it became Styx River State School. It closed in 1942. It was on Styx Road (22.5916°S 149.6337°E).

Hartley Provisional School opened on 26 May 1924 and became Hartley State School in 1929. It was renamed Ogmore State School in March 1933. It closed in 1999. It was at 2-4 Wilangi Street (22.6225°S 149.6609°E).

The Ogmore Emergency Hospital was opened on Sunday 15 May 1949 by the Minister for Lands, Tom Foley. The wooden building cost £4235 and could accommodate 4 patients in normal circumstances and 10 in an emergency. Its role was to provide out-patient services while in-patient services would generally be limited to patients waiting to be transferred to a more major hospital or after discharge from a more major hospital. It could also be used as a clinic by visiting dentists.

In April 1954, a goods train derailed near Ogmore. A bulldozer travelling on a flat bed carriage was believed to have shifted on the carriage, overturning the carriage.

The Styx mines closed in the 1960s. Queensland Rail disbanded its railway gang based in Ogmore in the 1990s. This caused the town's population to decline to about 30 people.

== Demographics ==
In the 2016 census, the locality of Ogmore had a population of 105 people.

In the 2021 census, the locality of Ogmore had a population of 72 people.

== Proposed coal mine ==
In December 2016, a new coal mine was proposed for the Styx River basin 4 kilometres (2.5 mi) south of the town. The proposal involves two open-cut pits to be mined by the truck-and-shovel methodology and will require a loading facility onto the North Coast railway line. The project is currently undergoing environmental impact assessment. The workforce of 200-250 people is expected to be recruited from the local area, including Ogmore and its neighbouring towns of Marlborough and St Lawrence. In April 2021, the environmental impact assessment determined that the project had too many environmental risks to proceed based on the current proposal.

== Education ==
There are no schools in Ogmore. The nearest government primary schools are Marlborough State School in neighbouring Marlborough to the south, St Lawrence State School in neighbouring St Lawrence to the north-west, and Clarke Creek State School in neighbouring Clarke Creek to the west. There are no secondary schools nearby; the alternatives are distance education and boarding school.
