= Koumala, Queensland =

Koumala
- Town
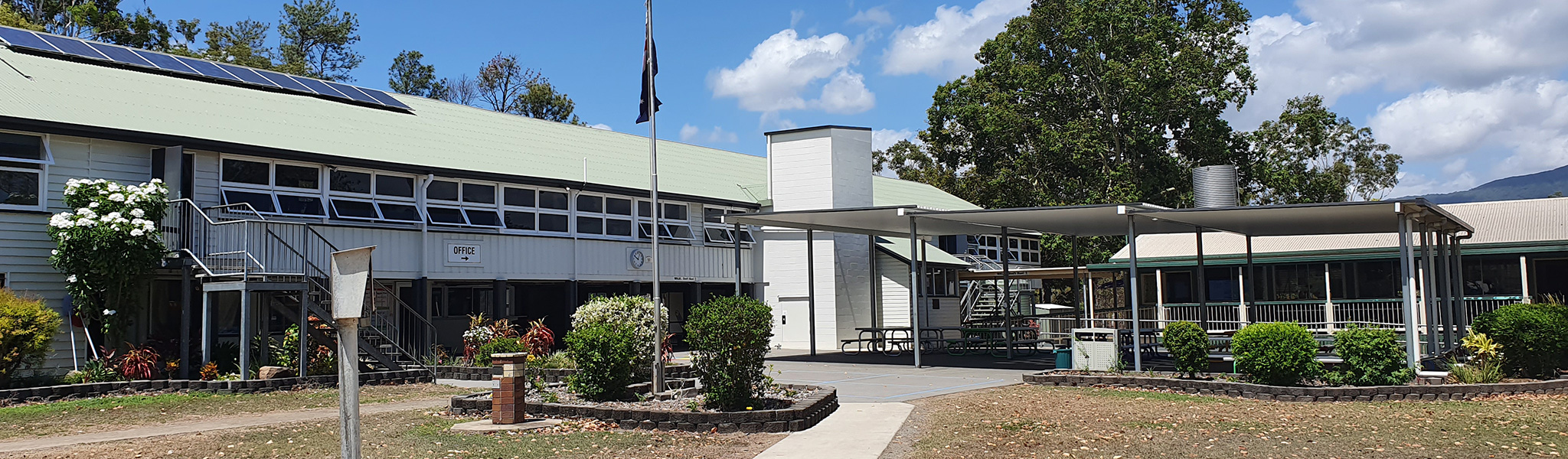
- Koumala State School, 2022

- Interactive map of Koumala
- Coordinates: 21.6088°S 149.2455°E
- Country: Australia
- State: Queensland
- LGA: Mackay Region
- Location: 25.7 km (16.0 mi) S of Sarina; 61.6 km (38.3 mi) S of Mackay; 898 km (558 mi) NNW of Brisbane

Government
  - State electorate: Mirani
  - Federal division: Capricornia

Area
  - Total: 832.2 km^{2} (321.3 sq mi)

Population
  - Total: 772 (2021 census)
  - Density: 0.9277/km^{2} (2.4026/sq mi)
- Time zone: UTC+10:00 (AEST)
- Postcode: 4738
Localities around Koumala
Sarina Range	Sarina	Coral Sea
Blue Mountain; Nebo	Koumala	Ilbilbie
Oxford	Collaroy	Ilbilbie

Koumala is a rural town and coastal locality in the Mackay Region, Queensland, Australia. In the 2021 census, the locality of Koumala had a population of 772 people.

== Geography ==
In the east, Cape Palmerston National Park protects the landscape surrounding Mount Funnel and Cape Palmerston. To the west is the Hatfield Range known locally are the Koumala Range. A gravel road over this range provides alternate access to the Sarina hinterland and was the only route available for several years after the paved route over the Sarina range was destroyed by landslides that occurred during Cyclone Debbie. The main rail line between the Bowen Basin coal mines and the port of Hay Point also passes over this range with speed restricted to 60 kilometres per hour (37 mph) on the downhill section of line, because of several derailments which have occurred in this section of track.

There are a number of neighbourhoods within the locality, including:

- Inneston (21.5536°S 149.2366°E)
- Karremal (21.6333°S 149.2833°E)
- Kelvin (21.5333°S 149.2833°E)
- Koumala South (21.65°S 149.2333°E)
- Loloma (21.5833°S 149.2333°E)

Yukan railway station is located at 21.5172°S 149.2325°E.

== Etymology ==
The town name Koumala originally derives from the name of its railway station, which was named in 1914 after a sugar property used by Alfred H. Burbank, a sugar grower and surveyor, using a Fijian word meaning sweet potato.

The neighbourhood name Inneston comes from the Inneston railway station, which was named by the Queensland Railways Department on 25 November 1911 after Alexander (Alex) Innes (6 April 1866 – 24 August 1948). Innes was the chairman of Plane Creek Sugar Mill in the late 1890s and again for 36 years from 1911 and also the chairman of Sarina Shire Council in 1912 and in 1920.

The neighbourhood name Karremal comes from the Karremal railway station, which was named on16 December 1920. It is an Aboriginal word meaning heat.

The neighbourhood name Loloma comes from the Loloma railway station, named on 19 November 1914.

The name Yukan is an Aboriginal word meaning rain.

== History ==
British colonisation at Koumala began in the early 1860s when Mark Millet Christian established the Kelvin Grove pastoral farming station. In 1867, after some Aboriginal people had speared cattle at this pastoral lease, the Native Police troopers chased members of the clan to some islands offshore and when they tried to return to the mainland "such a lesson was administered" to keep them from "committing outrages in that locality".

Koumala Post Office opened on 28 February 1884.

The town was part of the former Shire of Sarina.

Koumala State School opened in August 1922. The railway goods shed and associated huts doubled for school purposes from 1922 to 1923 when a proper school house was built, as well as for social functions until a hall was built.

Yukan State School opened in 1929 and closed circa 1942.

On Sunday 30 May 1954, the Catholic Church of the Holy Family was officially opened by Bishop Andrew Gerard Tynan. It has now closed. It was at 18–20 Graham Street (21.6098°S 149.2448°E). The church building is still extant.

== Demographics ==
In the 2011 census, the locality of Koumala had a population of 789 people.

In the 2016 census, the locality of Koumala had a population of 831 people.

In the 2021 census, the locality of Koumala had a population of 772 people.

== Heritage listings ==
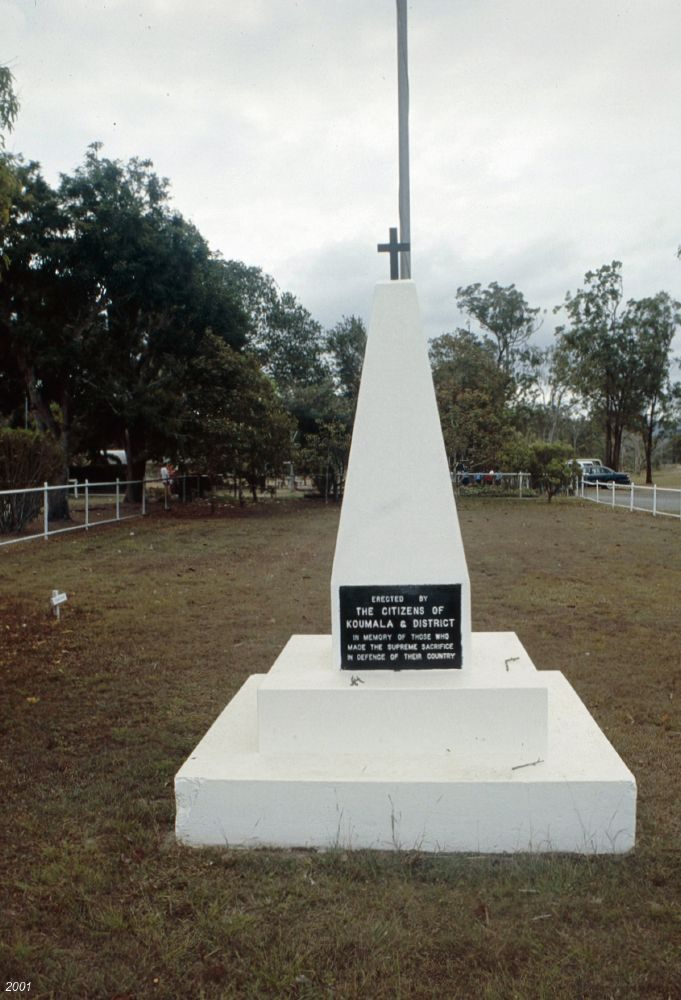
Koumala War Memorial, 2000

Koumala has a number of heritage-listed sites, including:

- Koumala War Memorial: Mumby Street (21.6073°S 149.2435°E)

== Education ==
Koumala State School is a government primary (Prep–6) school for boys and girls at Bull Street (21.6070°S 149.2433°E). In 2018, the school had an enrolment of 114 students with 8 teachers (6 full-time equivalent) and 8 non-teaching staff (5 full-time equivalent).

There are no secondary schools in Koumala. The nearest government secondary school is Sarina State High School in neighbouring Sarina to the north.

== Amenities ==
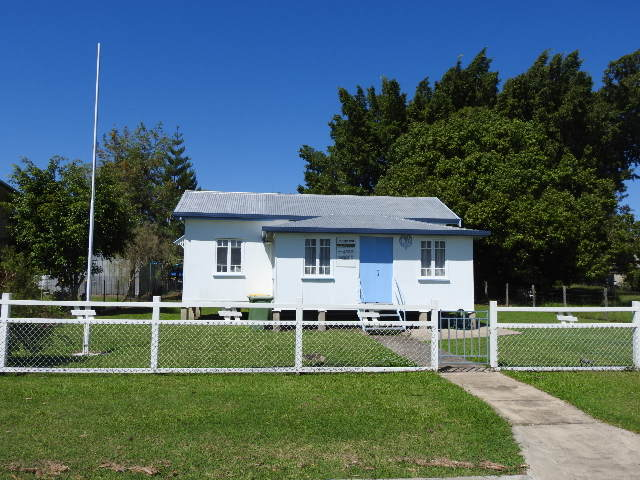
Country Women's Association building, Brown Street (October 2022).

The Mackay Regional Council operates a mobile library service on a fortnightly schedule at Bull Street near the school.

The Koumala branch of the Queensland Country Women's Association meets at the CWA Hall at 33 Brown Street (21.6074°S 149.2451°E).
