= St Lawrence, Queensland =

St Lawrence
- Town
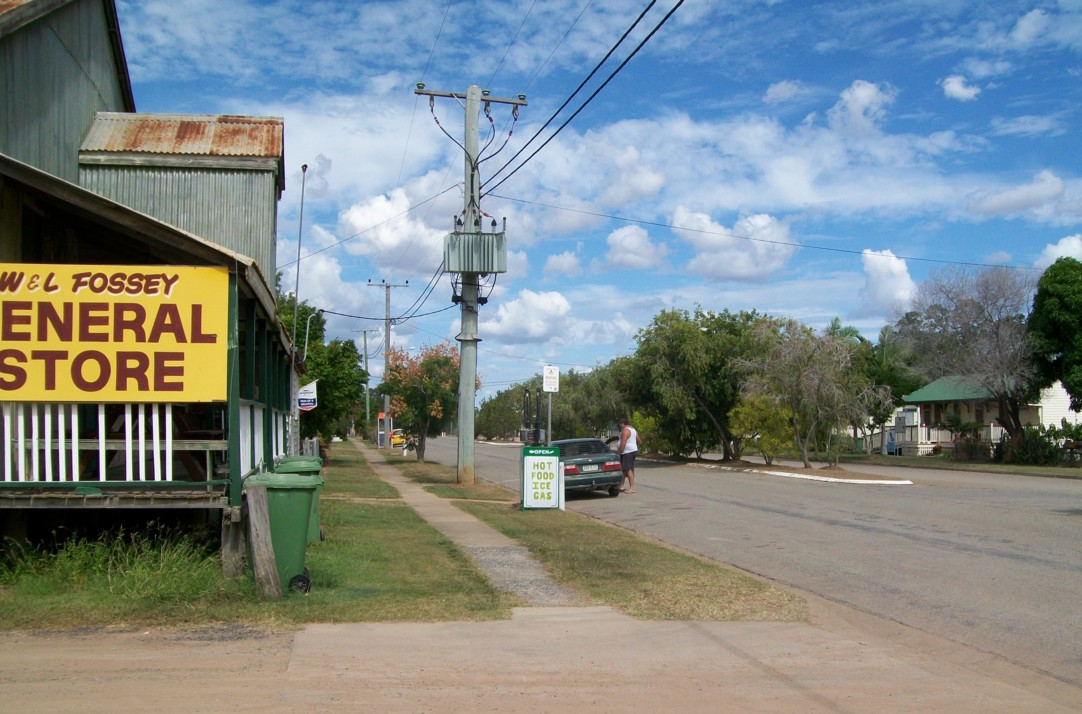
- View along St Lawrence's main street

- Interactive map of St Lawrence
- Coordinates: 22.3455°S 149.5352°E
- Country: Australia
- State: Queensland
- LGA: Isaac Region
- Location: 159 km (99 mi) S of Mackay; 186 km (116 mi) NW of Rockhampton; 238 km (148 mi) ESE of Moranbah; 809 km (503 mi) NNW of Brisbane

Government
  - State electorate: Mirani
  - Federal division: Capricornia

Area
  - Total: 1,381.8 km^{2} (533.5 sq mi)
- Elevation: 18 m (59 ft)

Population
  - Total: 245 (2021 census)
  - Density: 0.1773/km^{2} (0.4592/sq mi)
- Time zone: UTC+10:00 (AEST)
- Postcode: 4707
- Mean max temp: 31.8 °C (89.2 °F)
- Mean min temp: 10.9 °C (51.6 °F)
- Annual rainfall: 1,018.6 mm (40.10 in)
Localities around St Lawrence
Collaroy	Clairview	The Percy Group
Lotus Creek	St Lawrence	The Percy Group
Clarke Creek	Ogmore	Ogmore

St Lawrence is a rural town and locality in the Isaac Region, Queensland, Australia. In the 2021 census, the locality of St Lawrence had a population of 245 people.

== Geography ==
St Lawrence is located 802 kilometres (498 mi) north of Brisbane and 6 kilometres (3.7 mi) off the Bruce Highway.The town is located south of St Lawrence Creek, which flows into a vast bay known as Broad Sound, a waterway noted for its large tidal range (up to 9 metres (30 ft) in the summer).

The North Coast railway line passes through the town, which is served by St Lawrence railway station.

Newport is a neighbourhood within the locality, about 5 kilometres (3.1 mi) south-east of the town (22.3686°S 149.5658°E).

=== Climate ===
Climate data for St Lawrence (1991–2020)
Month	Jan	Feb	Mar	Apr	May	Jun	Jul	Aug	Sep	Oct	Nov	Dec	Year
Record high °C (°F)	44.0 (111.2)	40.2 (104.4)	38.8 (101.8)	34.8 (94.6)	35.5 (95.9)	31.0 (87.8)	31.6 (88.9)	32.7 (90.9)	34.8 (94.6)	39.1 (102.4)	43.5 (110.3)	40.0 (104.0)	44.0 (111.2)
Mean daily maximum °C (°F)	32.0 (89.6)	31.8 (89.2)	31.3 (88.3)	29.5 (85.1)	26.9 (80.4)	24.5 (76.1)	24.3 (75.7)	25.2 (77.4)	27.4 (81.3)	29.1 (84.4)	30.5 (86.9)	31.6 (88.9)	28.7 (83.7)
Daily mean °C (°F)	27.5 (81.5)	27.4 (81.3)	26.4 (79.5)	24.1 (75.4)	21.1 (70.0)	18.5 (65.3)	17.7 (63.9)	18.5 (65.3)	21.1 (70.0)	23.6 (74.5)	25.4 (77.7)	26.9 (80.4)	23.2 (73.8)
Mean daily minimum °C (°F)	23.0 (73.4)	23.0 (73.4)	21.5 (70.7)	18.7 (65.7)	15.2 (59.4)	12.5 (54.5)	11.1 (52.0)	11.7 (53.1)	14.8 (58.6)	18.1 (64.6)	20.4 (68.7)	22.1 (71.8)	17.7 (63.9)
Record low °C (°F)	17.6 (63.7)	16.7 (62.1)	14.3 (57.7)	7.7 (45.9)	5.6 (42.1)	2.3 (36.1)	1.1 (34.0)	1.4 (34.5)	4.8 (40.6)	7.6 (45.7)	12.9 (55.2)	14.0 (57.2)	1.1 (34.0)
Average precipitation mm (inches)	159.8 (6.29)	177.1 (6.97)	102.9 (4.05)	41.3 (1.63)	37.6 (1.48)	33.5 (1.32)	29.9 (1.18)	30.9 (1.22)	18.3 (0.72)	40.3 (1.59)	73.2 (2.88)	110.3 (4.34)	855.1 (33.67)
Average precipitation days (≥ 1 mm)	8.8	10.0	6.5	4.6	3.6	4.0	2.5	2.5	2.1	3.7	5.4	7.1	60.8
Average dew point °C (°F)	21.4 (70.5)	21.7 (71.1)	20.2 (68.4)	17.6 (63.7)	14.3 (57.7)	11.8 (53.2)	10.5 (50.9)	11.3 (52.3)	14.2 (57.6)	16.9 (62.4)	18.6 (65.5)	20.5 (68.9)	16.6 (61.9)
Source: National Oceanic and Atmospheric Administration

== History ==
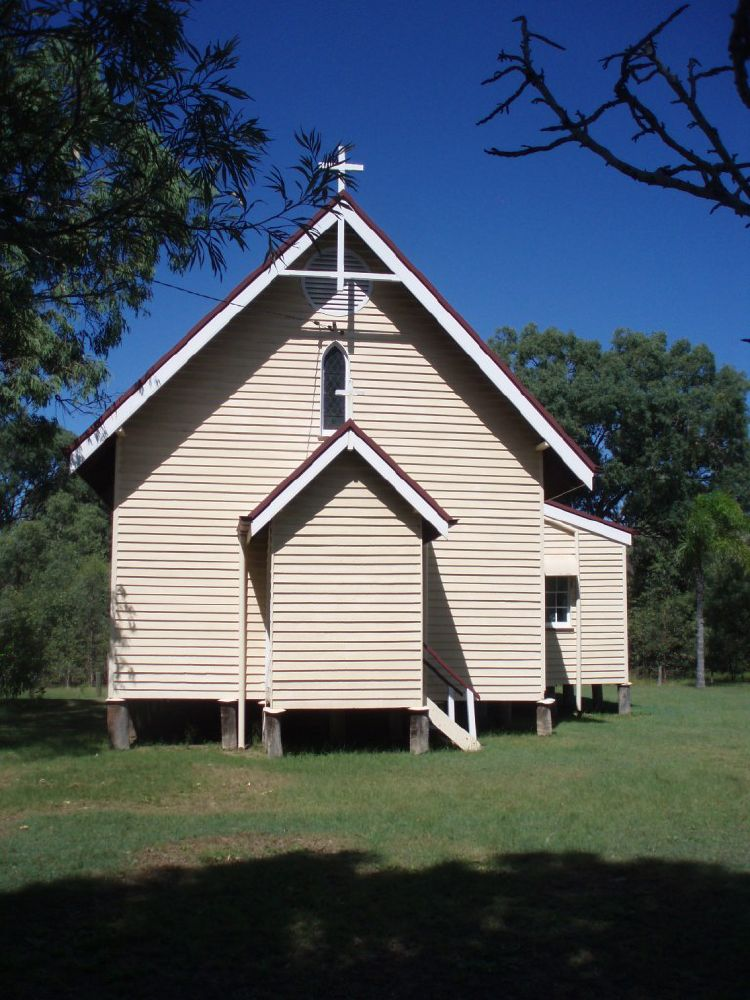
Christ Church Anglican, 2009

St Lawrence is located on Koinmerburra Country; the Custodians of this land are the Koinjmal People.

British settlement in the area began circa 1860 when John Arthur Macartney established Waverley pastoral station. The township of St Lawrence was originally established to maintain the Customs Office for the Port of St Lawrence. It takes its name from one of the blocks on the Waverley pastoral station.

The St Lawrence State School opened on 28 May 1871.

Anglican services were held quarterly in the St Lawrence Courthouse (now the St Lawrence Police Station) until the opening of the meatworks in 1893 attracted sufficient residents to establish a church. In March 1898, Vicar Arthur Henry Julius purchased 5 acres (2.0 ha) of land at the end of Macartney Street (the main street through the town) where he said the church would be "conspicuous". The foundation block for Christ Church Anglican was laid on Saturday 21 May 1898 by Thomas Byrnes, the new Queensland Premier (and Queensland's first Roman Catholic Premier). The church was designed by Rockhampton architect, Alfred Mowbray Hutton, to seat around 100 people with a classroom for Sunday School and a bedroom for visiting clergy. The contractors were Newman Bros of Rockhampton.

The St Lawrence Library opened in 2001.

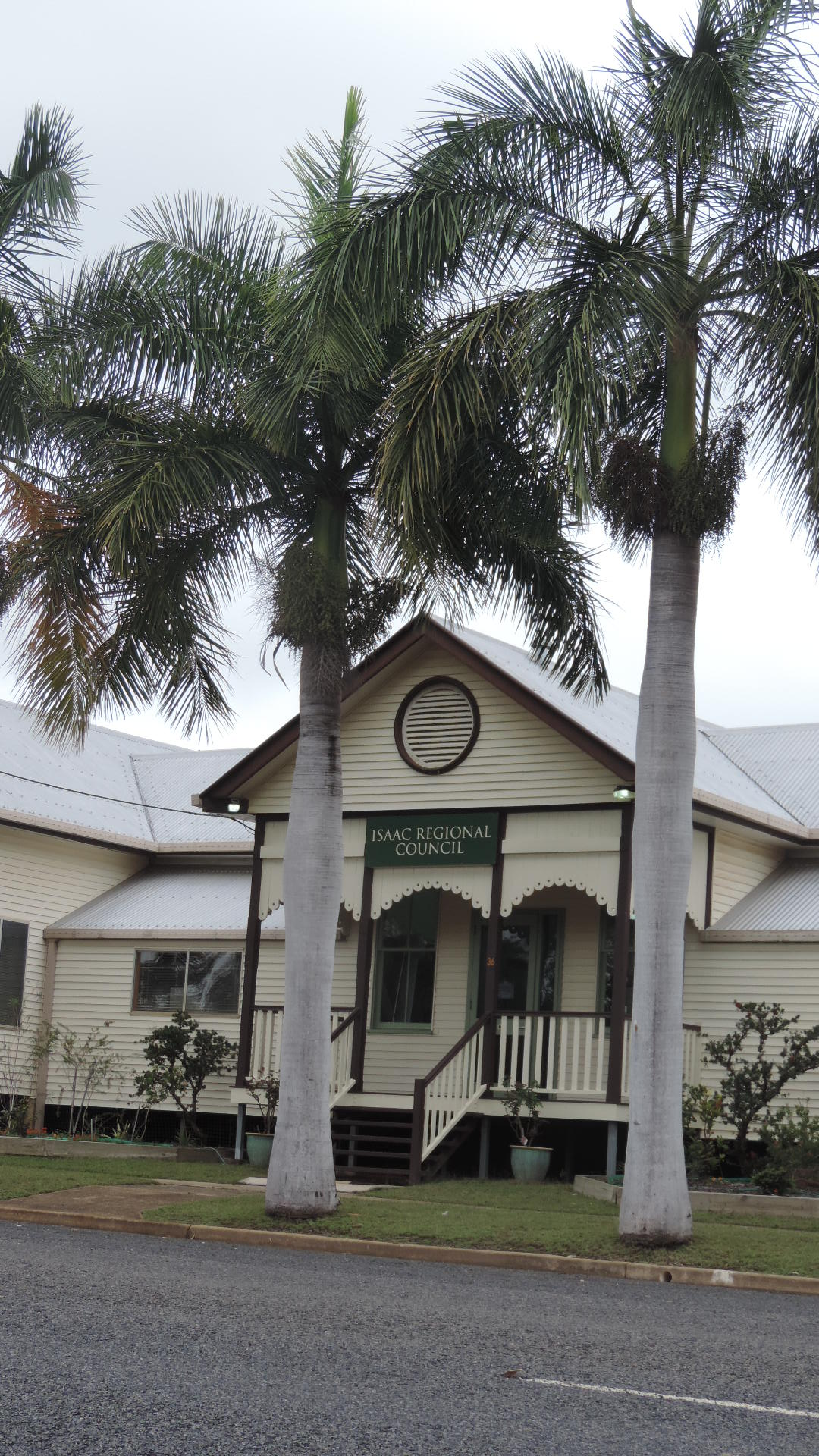
Offices of the Isaac Regional Council (formerly Broadsound Shire Council Chambers), 2016

St Lawrence was the administrative centre of the Shire of Broadsound until 2008, when the shire was amalgamated with the Shire of Belyando and the Shire of Nebo to form the Isaac Region local government area. Moranbah is the administrative centre of the new region but the former Broadsound Shire offices at 36 Macartney Street are still used as the local offices of the Isaac Regional Council. The building was described in 2004 as "a disarmingly elegant building which seems quite out of place in this otherwise undistinguished town".

Once a prosperous port town, exporting cattle from the hinterland, in 2019, many residents were DIDO coal miners.

== Demographics ==
In the 2006 census, the locality of St Lawrence and the surrounding area had a population of 195 people.

In the 2011 census, the locality of St Lawrence had a population of 396 people.

In the 2016 census, the locality of St Lawrence had a population of 235 people.

In the 2021 census, the locality of St Lawrence had a population of 245 people.

== Heritage listings ==
St Lawrence has a number of heritage-listed sites, including:

- Christ Church Anglican Church, Cannon Street
- St Lawrence Police Station, Macartney Street
- Meatworks and Wharf Site, Settlement Road

== Education ==
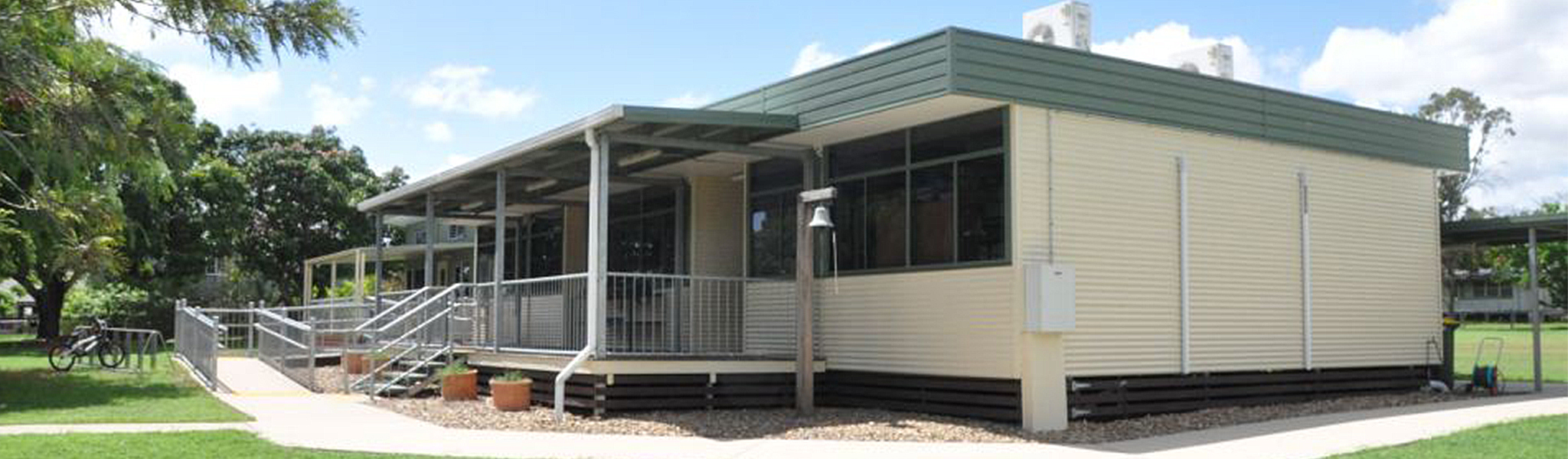
St Lawrence State School, 2025

St Lawrence State School is a government primary (Prep-6) school for boys and girls at 6 Macartney Street (22.3449°S 149.5297°E). In 2015, it had an enrolment of 10 students with 2 teachers (1 equivalent full-time). In 2018, the school had an enrolment of 9 students with 2 teachers (1 full-time equivalent) and 6 non-teaching staff (2 full-time equivalent). The school motto is 'Knowledge, Truth, Honesty'.

The original school was opened on 28 May 1871 but it was completely destroyed by a cyclone on 22 January 1874 and had to be rebuilt. A new school building was officially opened on 17 June 1938. The school was completely destroyed by fire on 30 October 2007. A mobile classroom was transported from Brisbane as the school's permanent replacement. A wishing well handcrafted by Jack Dempsey was installed at the site and dedicated in 2008 in remembrance of the previous school building.

St Lawrence State School celebrated its 150th anniversary in 2021.

There are no secondary schools in St Lawrence, nor nearby. Distance education and boarding school are the alernatives.

== Amenities ==
The Isaac Regional Council operates a public library at 22 Railway Parade (22.3510°S 149.5233°E).

Christ Church Anglican is on Cannon Street at the junction with Macartney Street (22.3458°S 149.5378°E). It is part of the Parish of North Rockhampton (also known as the All Saints Anglican Community) within the Anglican Church of Central Queensland.

== Events ==
Each June, an annual eco festival called "Wetlands Weekend" is held in St Lawrence to celebrate the wetlands and local produce. First held in 2008 to raise awareness of the importance of wetland conservation, the event incorporates various cultural activities, workshops, environmental art, musical performances as well as a 'Welcome to Wetlands' evening, a 'farm to plate' seafood lunch and a bush dinner. There are also celebrity appearances from personalities such as Gardening Australia presenter Costa Georgiadis and celebrity chef Matt Golinski. Isaac Regional Council credited the 2019 event for adding $121,000 to the local economy.

== Gallery ==
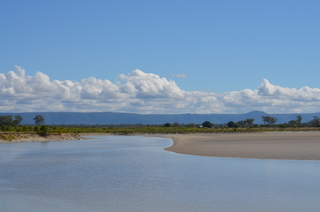
St Lawrence River - low tide

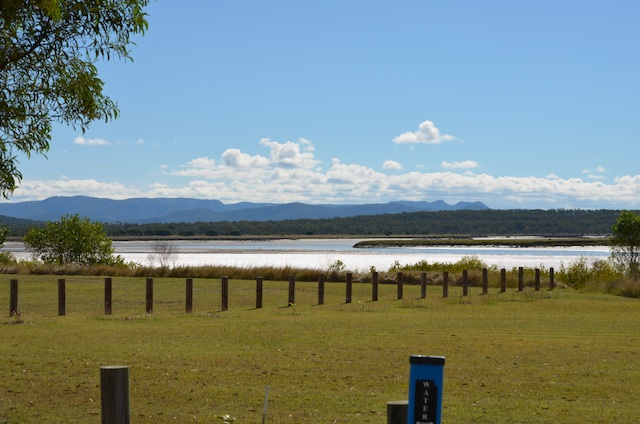
St Lawrence River - across the park

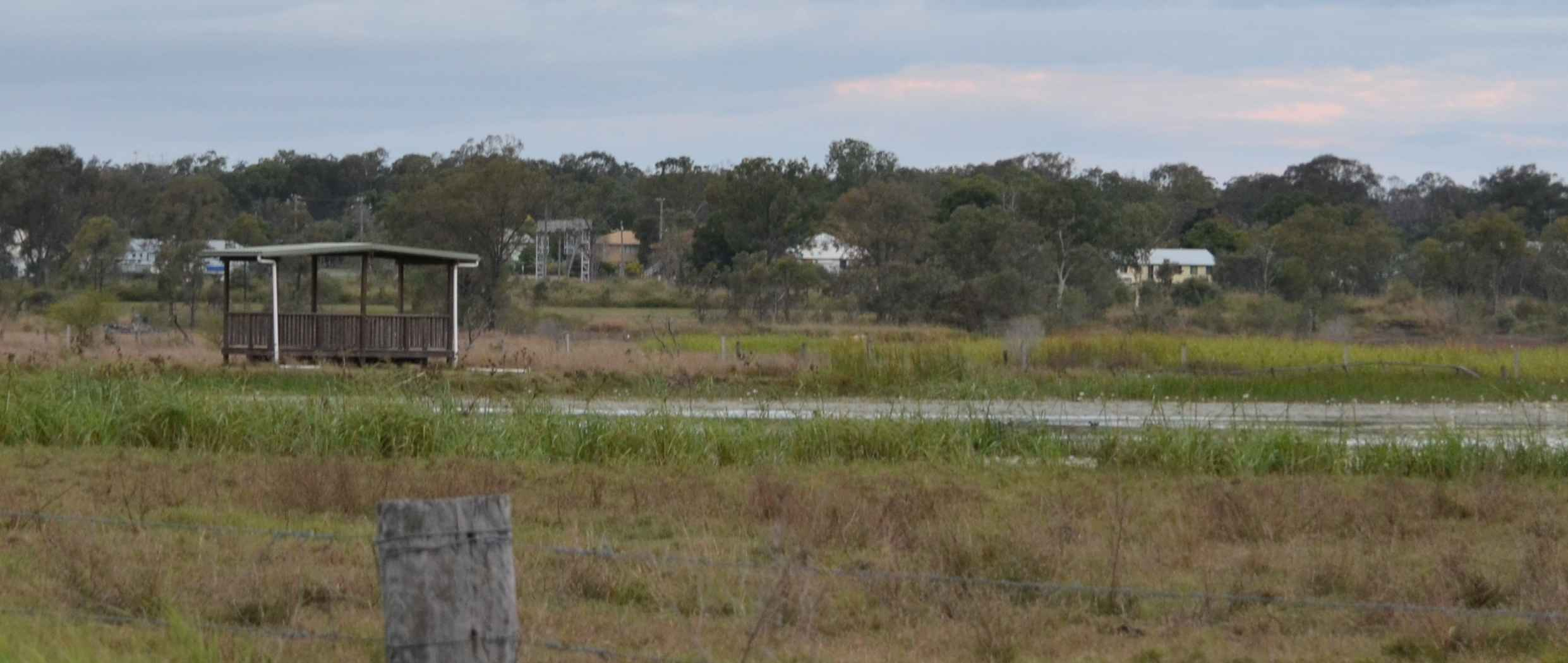
St Lawrence - Bird watching

== See also ==
- List of tramways in Queensland
