= Suttor River =

River in Queensland, Australia

Coordinates: 20°36′S 147°02′E

Location
- Country: Australia

Physical characteristics
- Source
  - location: Leichhardt Range
  - elevation: 348 metres (1,142 ft)
- Mouth
  - location: Lake Dalrymple
  - elevation: 158 metres (518 ft)
- Basin size: 73,936 km^{2} (28,547 sq mi)

The Suttor River is a river in Central Queensland, Australia. The Belyando River is its main tributary. The river has its origins in the Leichhardt Range, north west of Glenden. It flows into Lake Dalrymple, becoming a tributary of the Burdekin River.

== Geography ==
A DIWA wetlands can be found along the course of the river. The 332 hectares (820 acres) wetland known as the Scartwater Aggregation is a floodplain upstream from Lake Dalrymple where the river is split into two major channels by Scartwater Hill, a sandstone outcrop, the channels contain two large permanent waterholes.

== History ==
Jangga, also known as Yangga, is a language of Central Queensland. The Jangga language region includes the landscape within the local government boundaries of the Etheridge Shire Council.

The river was named after William Henry Suttor on 7 March 1845 by explorer Ludwig Leichhardt on his expedition from Moreton Bay to Port Essington. Suttor had given Leichhardt some bullocks for his expedition.

The Suttor River Causeway is a stone causeway built across the Suttor River on the Old Bowen Downs Road (today at St Anns Road, Mount Coolon). It was built in 1876 by Queensland Department of Public Works and is now listed on the Queensland Heritage Register as a rare example of the road construction techniques and materials employed in the state at the time.

The stone bridge which crosses the Suttor River at St Ann's was believed to be the work of convicts on parole who were once employed at St Ann’s. St Ann’s was one of the oldest settled portions of the district, by 1935 was downgraded to be an outstation of Yacamunda.

== See also ==
- List of rivers of Australia
