= James Earl (grazier) =

Merchant, cartage and cattle breeder

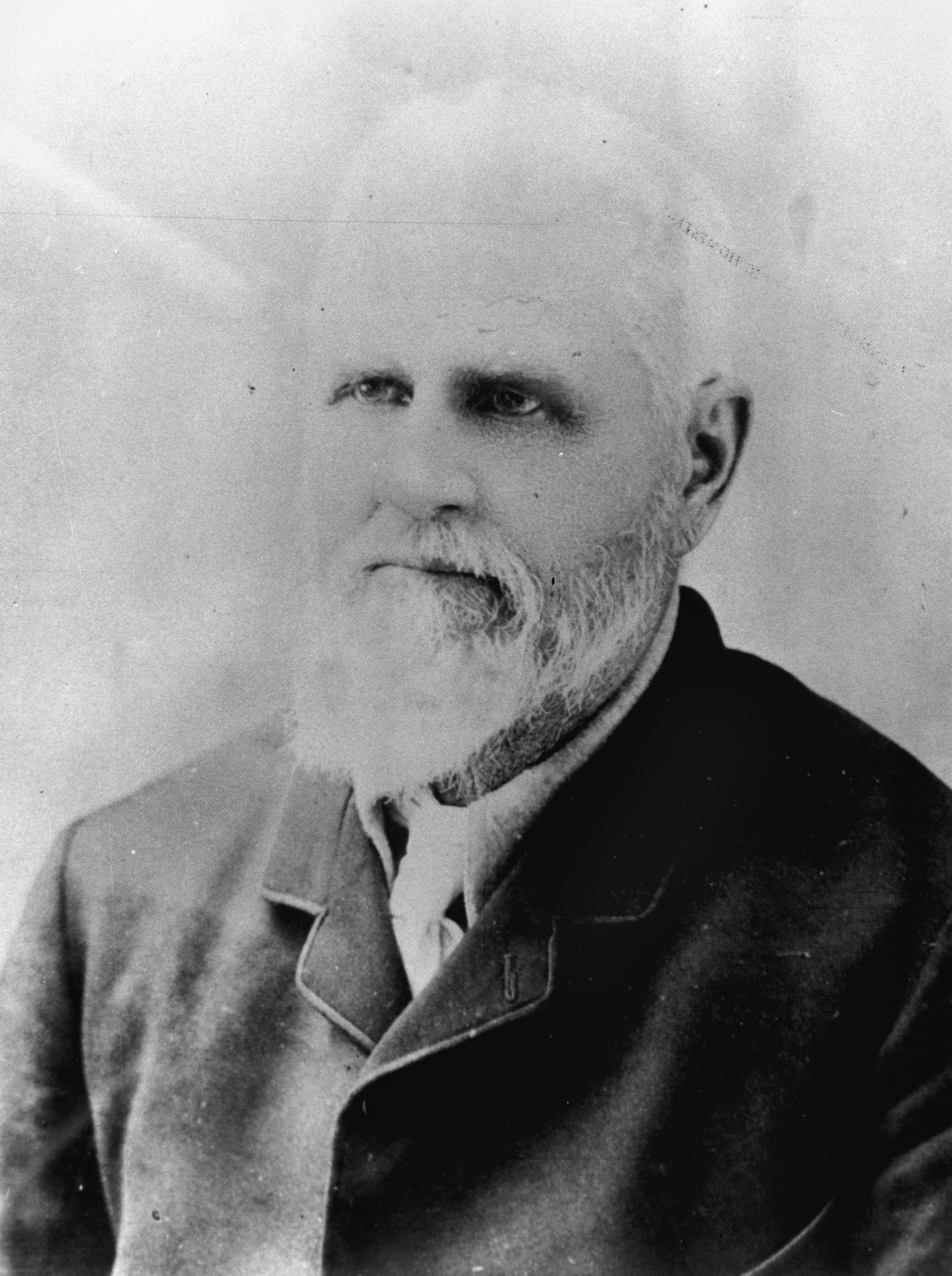
- Born: 24 October 1835; Cambridgeshire (England)
- Died: 14 October 1905 (aged 69); Townsville, Qld
- Occupations: Merchant, cattle supplier
- Known for: contributions to cattle farming and growth of the area
- Family: His daughter married a neighbour Charlie Wallace

James Earl (1835–1907) was a merchant in Far North Queensland of cartage and started cattle breeding.

He is well known for his contributions to the local area.

Butcher's Hill was historically referred to in order to describe locations, for example references to north, south etc. of Butchers Hill. This was because of the cattle station owned and run by Earl who became a butcher and the cattle station was known as Butcher's Hill. Butchers Hill could also refer to the Station. In modern times Lakeland is more commonly used and referred to as a landmark in the local area.

The Lakeland road stop is situated en-route to Cooktown from Cairns / Port Douglas / other southern locations. This road stop has various information that are in memory of James Earl.

James Earl lookout is a local tourist attraction and located nearby.

== Biography ==
James Earl was a native of Cambridgeshire. He came as a youth to Australia in the gold rush era. After landing in Melbourne he spent time prospecting for gold in Ballarat, Bendigo, Sandhurst, Victoria.

He later became a merchant and supplier. He recognised the value of cattle breeding and the ability to breed cattle in the Far North Queensland area.

He arrived in Queensland with his brothers William and Thomas, taking up the Yacamunda Station station on the Belyando River in the Bowen area.

He and his brothers William Earl and Thomas Earl, were described as “three young Englishmen”, were “path finders” and “trail breakers”, whose “names will go down in the history of this State”. They arrived at Bowen in 1860s, a recently established settlement described at that time as “a few tents and bark huts on the shore of Port Denison”. They moved westward in search of pastoral land. They eventually took up a vast land area there. They took up stocking in the area located on the Belyando River in the Bowen area. They were described as "squatters". They stocked the country and formed it into a station, calling it “Glen Lee”. The station later became known as Yacamunda Station.

The brothers took up the Iffley Station in 1864 but the following year were affected by a major flood. The brothers sought refuge from the floodwaters in nearby trees while the floods carried off their entire stock. They subsequently returned to Yacamunda.

In 1873, 10,000 miners arrived in Cooktown, travelling on foot or on horseback to Palmer.

This influx of people provided business opportunities for the Earl family.

The brothers started their lucrative cartage business which included routes beteeen Cooktown and Palmer as well as other areas in the Cook district.

One of the resting stops on the road was Butcher's Hill and there is now a roadhouse and tourist/passerby stop in Lakeland previously known as Butcher's Hill station.

Earl took up the station in 1874 without his brothers by dissolving the partnership while relocating his share of the Yacamunda Station stock to the new station. This was lucrative because of the influx of population to the Palmer area because of the recently discovered Palmer goldfields.

Earl diversified into selling meat to the public via butcheries locally in the goldfields area (supplying Lakeland and Palmer River) and Cooktown.

“Red Water Fever” decimated cattle supplies. Earl diversified into horses.

Earl later retired and moved to Townsville where he died in the hospital there after a lengthy illness.

== See also ==
- Palmer River#Palmer River Goldfields
