= Suttor River Causeway =

Historic road in Queensland, Australia

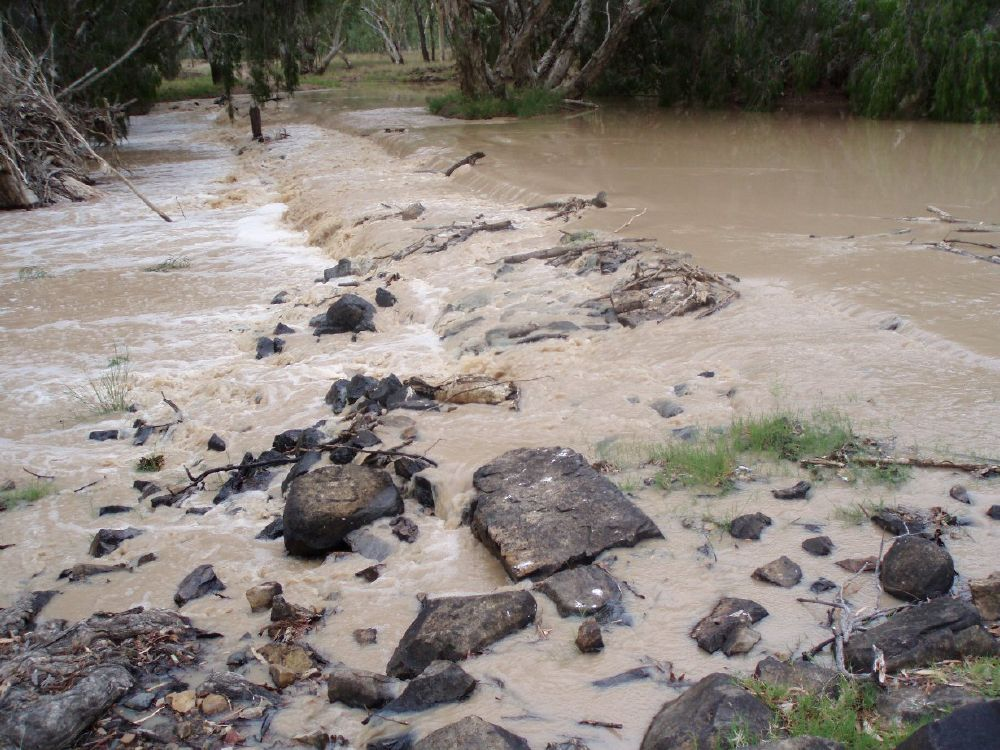
- Suttor River Causeway

- Location within Queensland Location within Australia
- 21.2250°S 146.9126°E
- Location: St Anns Road, Mount Coolon, Whitsunday Region, Queensland, Australia

History
- Design period: 1870s - 1890s (late 19th century)
- Built: 1876

Queensland Heritage Register
- Official name: Suttor River Causeway, Old Bowen Downs Road, St Anns Crossing
- Type: state heritage (built)
- Designated: 18 September 2008
- Reference no.: 601777
- Significant period: 1870s
- Significant components: causeway/ford
- Builders: Queensland Department of Public Works

Suttor River Causeway is a heritage-listed causeway across the Suttor River on the Old Bowen Downs Road, now at St Anns Road, Mount Coolon, Whitsunday Region, Queensland, Australia. It was built in 1876 by the Queensland Department of Public Works. It is also known as St Anns Crossing and Old Bowen Downs Road. It was added to the Queensland Heritage Register on 18 September 2008.

== History ==
Old Bowen Downs Road was established in the early 1860s as a teamster route between Port Denison (Bowen) and Bowen Downs Station near Aramac in central western Queensland. The road was in regular use until at least the late 1890s as a communication and supply line between the interior and the coast. While remnants of the road remain visible between Strathmore Station and Mount Douglas, the stone causeway built in 1876 over the Suttor River at St Anns remains largely intact as an example of early civil engineering stonework in northern Queensland.

The Kennedy district was first explored by Europeans in the mid-1840s when Ludwig Leichhardt ventured into the upper Burdekin Valley. The area was not opened for settlement until 1861 and by the end of that year pastoralists had taken up most of the runs in the region. These isolated western stations relied upon teamster routes for important communication and supply lines to the coastal centres of the Kennedy.

One of these routes, which was established in the early 1860s and became known as the Bowen Downs Road, ran about 500 kilometres (310 mi) from Bowen through Eton Vale, Strathmore, Heidelberg, Hidden Valley (now known as Old Hidden Valley), Scartwater, St Anns, Mount Douglas, Bully Creek (now known as Bulliwallah), Tomahawk Creek, south end of Lake Buchanan, Duck Ponds, The Fisheries (now known as Aberfoyle waterhole), down Torrens Creek, across Cornish Creek and then on to Bowen Downs.

The road followed a path of semi-permanent sources water that were essential for the sustenance of the livestock travelling through the otherwise mostly arid region. They were also important places for the Indigenous people living in the area. In particular, the Fisheries (Aberfoyle waterhole) was called this because Aboriginal people throughout the area went there to fish for golden perch using wicker-nets and fish traps made of hedges. During the early years of colonisation, competition for ownership and access to this waterhole was fierce. In 1865, the managers of Tower Hill cattle station, Llewellyn Meredith and Robert McNeely were killed by Aboriginal people at the Fisheries. Retribution soon followed and "the blacks in their turn had their graves by the score". With the destruction of Aboriginal society, the Fisheries became overstocked with fish. In 1890, the manager of Aberfoyle station removed tonnes of giant golden perch and burnt them to keep the waterhole clear.

With a decentralized system of road administration, no local authority to facilitate road building and a constant lack of money, Queensland's early road networks were generally in poor condition. The Kennedy district was no exception. The region had been identified as a rich pastoral area and the government realised that the development and maintenance of roads in the district was essential to support the growing rural economy as settlement spread. In August 1863 Henry Taylor Plews, Engineer of Roads for the Northern Division, informed a Select Committee on the Main Roads of the Colony that with regards to most of the roads in the Northern District, "... a great many of them have not been surveyed, and are not yet marked out; and that there are continually new roads becoming necessary."

Anticipating a heavy traffic between Bowen (Port Denison) and the interior, he recommended that the existing track be surveyed and cleared, and the creek crossings made trafficable. The Select Committee concurred. Plews engaged extra staff to carry out works in the Kennedy district and in 1863 and 1864 the Queensland Legislative Assembly allocated funds for road development in the area.

By 1865 Frederick Byerley had replaced Plews as Engineer of Roads for the Northern Division; his report for the period covering 1864 to March 1865 showed that the construction of a trafficable road from Bowen to the Suttor River had been given priority and had cost about £925. Despite this injection of money into road development in the Bowen district, local residents remained dissatisfied. An 1865 memorandum to Arthur Macalister, Minister for Lands and Works, from the people of Bowen, argued that Bowen was excluded from trade with the pastoral runs of the interior, owing to the want of roads, and that government roads expenditure in the Bowen area was disproportionate to that spent in other parts of the Kennedy pastoral district. The petitioners suggest that the Bowen Downs Road should be maintained as far as Earls and from that point a new line through Conway running the course of the Rosetta Creek should be constructed. By 1868 the suggestion of a new line to Bowen Downs had been taken up and a map of the Kennedy district, published in 1868 by the government's Chief Engraver, Thomas Ham, showed the new route, named Port Denison Road, tracing along the course of Rosetta Creek.

Despite the construction of the Port Denison Road, traffic continued to use the old Bowen Downs Road and a fortnightly mail service covering some 353 miles (568 km) between Bowen Downs Station and Bowen, as indicated in Pugh's Almanac of 1875, was maintained. In September 1876 the Engineer of Roads in Bowen reported that use of the Bowen Downs Road had increased, in part due to the wool trade and in part to the discovery of gold in the interior, and that this increase in traffic had warranted considerable repairs along the line. A priority was the construction of a stone bridge over the Suttor River at St Anns, which had begun earlier in 1876. The Engineer of Roads outlined how many of the stones "have turned on edge" and "present a bumpy surface to wheels", and concluded that although the work was costly, all the stones having to be blasted, "the substantial completion of the Bridge is of urgent consequence for communication between the southern and northern goldfields."

The stone causeway at the Suttor River was an early civil engineering project undertaken by the Queensland Government in North Queensland. The earliest appears to have been the stone bridge and culvert on Damper creek on the Dalrymple Gap Track, which was built in the mid-1860s. From 1880, responsibility for surveying, constructing and maintaining roads passed from the Works Department to local Divisional Boards and the Department of Public Lands (as the latter still built roads on Crown Lands opened for selection) and the Queensland Government did not resume a major role in building main roads until the 1920s.

In September 1896 the Survey Office issued instructions to Francis Blennerhassett to survey the Old Bowen Downs Road and mark out new camping reserves. Blennerhassett's plan, transmitted to the Surveyor General in August 1897, indicates that the road was still in use at the time and that portions were in good condition, including a "good smooth rock crossing" over Strathmore Creek near Strathmore.

Remnants of the Old Bowen Downs road remain between Strathmore Station and Mount Douglas. A group of Bowen residents traced the road in 1964 and found several inns along the route as well as evidence of a stone crossing over Percy Douglas Creek near Mount Wyatt. Significantly, the stone bridge built over the Suttor River in 1876 was intact and was described in the 1960s as being:

"... flanked by a lagoon upstream, shaded by tall over-hanging ti-trees, and with shady groves on the downstream side ... On the far bank ghost gums completed a delightful scene ... The well-placed great black stones of the roadway and the neat stone-pitching of the walls were undisturbed after nearly a century of floods."

The Old Bowen Downs Road is no longer a state-controlled road and is no longer in general use. The stone causeway over the Suttor River is used mainly by local residents taking alternative routes between St Anns Station and Scartwater.

== Description ==
Much of the nineteenth century work on The Old Bowen Downs Road has fallen into disrepair. Remnants of the stone causeway over Percy Douglas Creek are barely discernible, but the 1876 causeway over the Suttor River at St Anns remains substantially intact.

The Suttor River Causeway, which is subject to flooding, is likely constructed of locally sourced stone. As the river is braided the causeway is in two sections, the southern section being longer and more intact than the northern. Flooding has dislodged some of the stonework, especially on the northern section. Two later concrete tyre tracks have been laid over the stone surface of the southern section, to accommodate motor vehicles. Timber posts remain on the downstream side of the crossing with an additional post on the upstream west side, possibly providing guidance during flooding. The causeway is flanked by indigenous Melaleuca sp. and Eucalyptus sp. and has an aesthetic value generated by the rustic materials and the bush setting.

== Heritage listing ==
Suttor River Causeway on the Old Bowen Downs Road was listed on the Queensland Heritage Register on 18 September 2008 having satisfied the following criteria.

The place is important in demonstrating the evolution or pattern of Queensland's history.

The Old Bowen Downs Road was established in the early 1860s as a teamster route between Port Denison (Bowen) on the coast and Bowen Downs Station inland, and continued in use until at least the late 1890s. As a vital communication and supply line between Bowen and remote western runs, development and maintenance of the Old Bowen Downs Road was crucial to the growth of the region's economy during the nineteenth century.

Remnants of the Old Bowen Downs Road are significant as evidence of the early establishment of vital road networks in rural Queensland during the second half of the nineteenth century. The 1876 stone causeway over the Suttor River remains particularly intact and is important in demonstrating engineering techniques and materials used in rural road construction in Queensland as settlement spread along the river valleys.

The place demonstrates rare, uncommon or endangered aspects of Queensland's cultural heritage.

The 1876 stone causeway across the Suttor River remains substantially intact and provides rare surviving evidence of road construction techniques and materials employed in Queensland at this period. It is a rare, early civil engineering project in North Queensland, built by the Queensland government prior to Divisional Boards taking responsibility for road building in 1880.

The place is important in demonstrating the principal characteristics of a particular class of cultural places.

The 1876 stone causeway across the Suttor River remains substantially intact and is important in demonstrating the principal characteristics of its type. These characteristics include the use of stone for the construction and the submersible design.

The place is important because of its aesthetic significance.

Flanked by mature indigenous vegetation, the 1876 stone causeway across the Suttor River occupies a picturesque setting and is important for its aesthetic significance. It forms part of a landmark feature that is well known in the region and has been the subject of several publications including Pioneer Pub Crawl: Along the Old Bowen Downs Road and Bowen Downs and the Road to Bowen.
