= Iffley Station =

Pastoral lease in Queensland

Coordinates: 18.86821°S 141.20696°E

Location in Queensland

Iffley Station is a pastoral lease that currently operates as a cattle station in Queensland.

== Description ==
The property is situated approximately 133 kilometres (83 mi) south of Normanton and 206 kilometres (128 mi) north of Julia Creek in the Gulf Country of Queensland. The property is composed of rolling downs grassed with Mitchell grass, bluegrass, salt bush and other herbages.

Occupying an area of about 1,600 square miles (4,144 km^{2}), the property is composed of half sandy forest country and the remainder is open downs of Mitchell grass. Both the Saxby and the Norman Rivers traverse the property.

== History ==
James Earl arrived in Queensland with his brothers William and Thomas. They originally took up the Yacamunda Station on the Belyando River in the Bowen area, later taking up the Iffley Station in 1864.

The following year they were affected by a major flood. The brothers sought refuge from the floodwaters in nearby trees while the floods carried off their entire stock. They subsequently returned to Yacamunda.

In 1884 the 997-square-mile (2,582 km^{2}) property was sold by Messrs Walsh, Brown and Walsh to D. F. MacKay along with the 4,400 head of cattle it was stocked with. Mackay placed the station on the market in 1894. At this time it was 801 square miles (2,075 km^{2}) and was stocked with 22,000 head of cattle and 166 horses.

The property was placed on the market by the trustees of the estate of D. F. MacKay in 1904. Stocked with about 15,000 Durham cattle and 187 horses the 934 square miles (2,419 km^{2}) station included managers house, men's quarters store house, cattle yards and two recently sunk bores.

In 1931 the property was owned by Kidman and Angliss, who remained in charge until at least 1942.

The property was acquired by Don McDonald, the eldest son of Jim McDonald, in 1979 along with Rutland Plains. Iffley is currently owned by MDH, still owned by the McDonald family, and is one of the companies 11 cattle stations throughout Queensland. It is managed by Clint and Heidi Smith who have been there since 2003.

== See also ==
- List of ranches and stations
