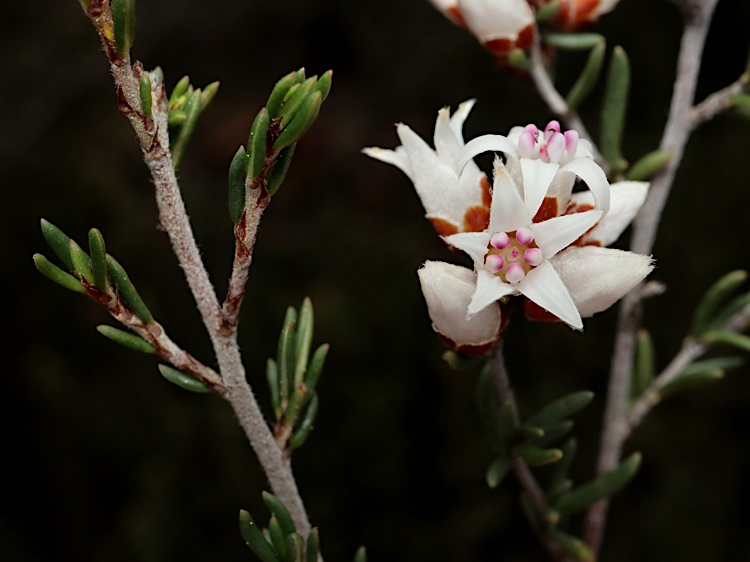
- Subspecies speciosa near the Cotter River

Scientific classification
- Kingdom: Plantae
- Clade: Tracheophytes
- Clade: Angiosperms
- Clade: Eudicots
- Clade: Rosids
- Order: Rosales
- Family: Rhamnaceae
- Genus: Cryptandra
- Species: C. speciosa

Binomial name
- Cryptandra speciosa A.Cunn. ex Kellermann & Udovicic

= Cryptandra speciosa =

Species of flowering plant

Cryptandra speciosa is a species of flowering plant in the family Rhamnaceae and is endemic to eastern Australia. It is a shrub with clusters of linear to narrowly elliptic leaves, and clusters white, tube-shaped flowers in leaf axils.

== Description ==
Cryptandra speciosa is a shrub that typically grows to a height of 0.4–2 m (1 ft 4 in – 6 ft 7 in) and has hairy, but not spiny branchlets. The leaves are linear to narrowly elliptic, mostly 2.6–5.1 mm (0.10–0.20 in) long and 0.4–0.8 mm (0.016–0.031 in) wide on a petiole 0.2–0.7 mm (0.0079–0.0276 in) long and often clustered. There are triangular stipules 1.1–2.0 mm (0.043–0.079 in) long and at the base of the petioles. The edges of the leaves are rolled under, obscuring the lower surface, and the upper surface is glabrous. The flowers are borne singly or in groups of up to 10 in leaf axils, with 6 to 10 broadly egg-shaped bracts at the base of each flower, each flower on a pedicel 0.2–1 mm (0.0079–0.0394 in) long. The floral tube is white, bell-shaped, 2.2–3.5 mm (0.087–0.138 in) long, the lobes erect, 1.8–2.7 mm (0.071–0.106 in) long, and the petals erect and 1.0–1.6 mm (0.039–0.063 in) long.

== Taxonomy and naming ==
Cryptandra speciosa was first formally described in 2007 by Jürgen Kellermann and Frank Udovicic in the Proceedings of the Linnean Society of New South Wales from an unpublished description by Allan Cunningham. The specific epithet (speciosa) means "showy" or "splendid".

In the same journal, Kellermann and Udovicic described two subspecies of C. speciosa, and the names are accepted by the Australian Plant Census:

- Cryptandra speciosa subsp. speciosa Kellermann & Udovicic has branchlets with both star-shaped and flattened simple hairs, bracts 2.1–4.6 mm (0.083–0.181 in) long, pedicels 0.5–1 mm (0.020–0.039 in) long, sepals 2.6–4 mm (0.10–0.16 in) long and petals 1.2–1.6 mm (0.047–0.063 in) long.
- Cryptandra speciosa A.Cunn. ex Fenzl subsp. strigosa has branchlets with only flattened simple hairs, bracts 1.4–2.7 mm (0.055–0.106 in) long, pedicels 0.2–0.3 mm (0.0079–0.0118 in) long, sepals 2.2–2.8 mm (0.087–0.110 in) long and petals 1.0–1.1 mm (0.039–0.043 in) long.

== Distribution and habitat ==
Subspecies speciosa grows in sandy soil over sandstone or volcanic rocks, and is found in woodland and Callitris forest on the tablelands of New South Wales to the Victorian Alps near the border with New South Wales. Subspecies strigosa grows on poor soil on sandstone and rocky outcrops between the Narrien Range and Carnarvon National Park in the Leichhardt and South Kennedy districts of central Queensland.

== Conservation status ==
Subspecies speciosa is listed as "critically endangered" in Victoria under the Victorian Government Flora and Fauna Guarantee Act.
