= Barclay's Battery =

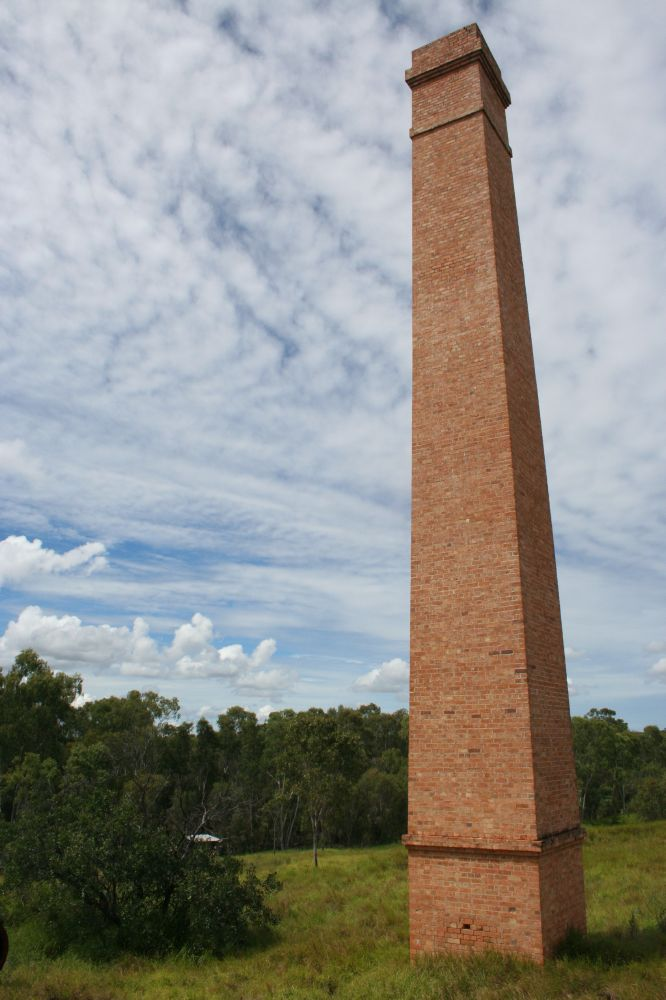
- Chimney, Barclay's Battery

- Location within Queensland Location within Australia
- 21.3836°S 147.3415°E
- Location: Collinsville road, Mount Coolon, Whitsunday Region, Queensland, Australia

History
- Design period: 1914 - 1919 (World War I)
- Built: 1914 - 1932

Queensland Heritage Register
- Official name: Barclay's Battery, Mount Coolon Gold Mines Battery
- Type: state heritage (archaeological, built)
- Designated: 17 May 2004
- Reference no.: 602242
- Significant period: 1914-1932 (fabric); 1914-1941, 1918, 1935 (historical)
- Significant components: mounting block/stand, residential accommodation - housing, chimney/chimney stack, weir, vat, machinery/plant/equipment - mining/mineral processing

Barclay's Battery is a heritage-listed stamper battery at Collinsville road, Mount Coolon, Whitsunday Region, Queensland, Australia. It was built from 1914 to 1932. It is also known as Mount Coolon Gold Mines Battery. It was added to the Queensland Heritage Register on 17 May 2004.

== History ==
Mount Coolon is situated approximately 130 kilometres (81 mi) south-west of Collinsville, and 200 kilometres (120 mi) north of Clermont. Luke Reynolds, a jackeroo from Yacamunda station, discovered gold there in 1913. Thomas Coolon was the first to peg a claim in 1914, but other claims were quickly taken up, including one of the most active prospectors, James Barclay.

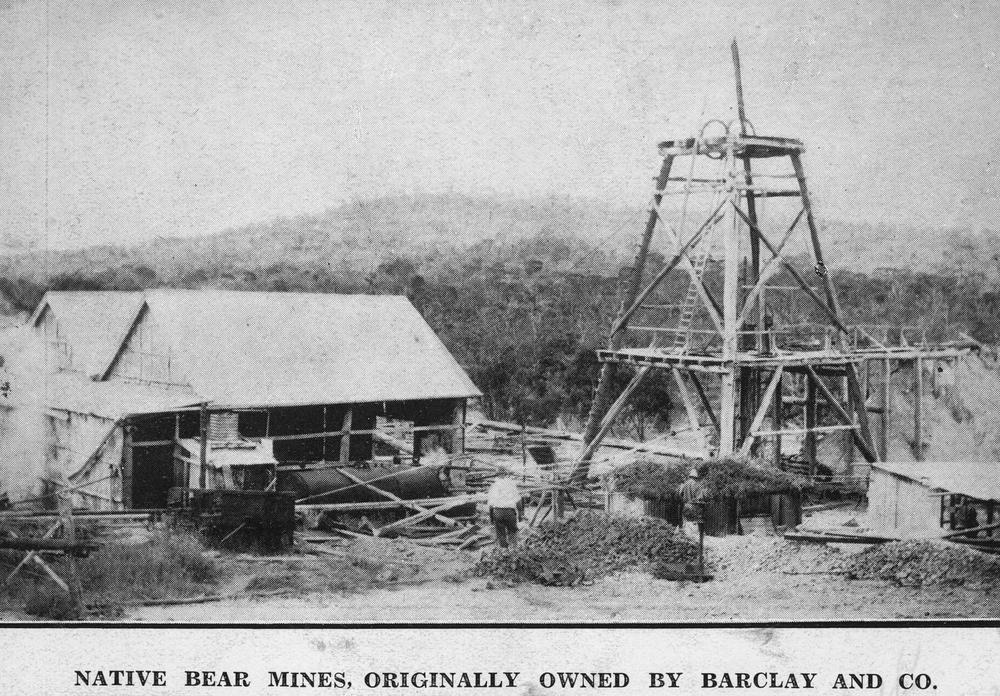
Barclay's Native Bear Mine, Mount Coolon, 1932

James Barclay mined gold, at what became the Native Bear lease, from 1914 when he constructed a 5 head battery on the present site at Police Creek, 2.4 kilometres (1.5 mi) from the mine. In 1917, the Sydney lease owners Hooke and Sutherland erected 10 stamps nearby, and Barclay consolidated claims to form the Native Bear lease, which was the most valuable section of the gold lode. That same year Barclay erected another 15 head of stamps, two Cornish boilers, machinery, an assay plant and smelting furnace and a 23-metre (75 ft) chimney made out of 200,000 local bricks at his Police Creek battery. Barclay had begun operating a cyanide plant by 1918.

A township called Koala (now Mount Coolon) was surveyed on Police Creek in 1917. Mount Coolon is largely remembered in North Queensland folklore as a result of the multiple murder-suicide that took place in November 1918. This incident generated Australia-wide attention and notoriety, as the calculated shooting cost the lives of five men. The offender, Thomas Coolon, had lost his gold mining claim following an application for forfeiture by an individual named Thompson, which was then upheld by the mining warden's court.

Seething at the perceived injustice of Thompson's action, and the court's subsequent dismissal of an appeal, Coolon armed himself, shot Thompson and one of his workers and later two other hands at the Sydney battery before turning the gun on himself. That he made a will that same morning, and arranged for Barclay to provide for his wife before taking his own life, conferred on the murders an aura of tragedy in which newspaper feature writers revelled for over fifty years.

In 1921 over 2,100 ounces (60,000 g) of gold were produced and by 1922 there were 12 adjacent leases on the Mount Coolon lode. However most of the gold came from Barclay's Native Bear lease and kept the battery operating on two shifts per day, crushing from 7 to 8 long tons (7.1 to 8.1 t) per shift. Barclay's battery output for 1921 was 2,546 long tons (2,587 t) of stone crushed yielding 1,707 ounces (48,400 g) of gold and 400 long tons (410 t) of tailings cyanided yielding 425 ounces (12,000 g), the total valued at over £7000. In 1922 Barclay erected another 10 head of stamps.

The slow development of the Mount Coolon goldfield was attributed to the absence of a custom battery, so in 1924 an Empire ball mill was erected on a site near the Mount Coolon battery on Police Creek, while Barclay installed a powerful gas suction engine early in the year to replace the steam power plant to run all his plant and equipment. The Sydney battery was still operating on Police Creek, making a total of three working mills.

By June 1932 Mount Coolon Gold Mines had taken over all the batteries and mines on the lode and built a new dam (the existing one) on Police Creek. Mr Cec Hammond, a teamster carting lime and wood to the company's plant, lived in the cottage near the weir.

In 1932 Mount Coolon had the highest gold production in Queensland and the Mount Coolon Gold Mines No Liability Company, who had bought out Barclay, had erected a large reduction and cyaniding plant 2.3 kilometres (1.4 mi) south of the town.

At Mount Coolon in 1935, a six-month industrial conflict occurred which marks an important milestone in Queensland's industrial relations history. Analysis of the events leading up to and during this strike ably reveals many of the difficulties and tensions associated with isolated mining operations in semi-arid Australia.

The dispute, which involved only some one hundred employees, also throws a glimmer of light on management tactics; relations between the Australian Workers' Union (AWU) and employers; collaboration among mining companies; and the alignment of ideological forces in the Queensland labour movement in the 1930s.

This strike was to acquire all the hallmarks of industrial action in which rank and file unionists were pitted against not only the mine's management, but also other workers, and more particularly their own union - Australian Workers' Union (AWU). This industrial action had been initiated by local action in April 1935, without any reference to the union organisation or leadership at either the district or state level. The trouble was exacerbated by the oppressive living conditions of this semi-arid region, compounded by the severe drought during the summer of 1934–35.

In the late 1930s the Mount Coolon goldfield was also significant as a profitable concern for its parent company, Gold Mines of Australia, which in turn, was the catalyst for the early growth of the mining giant, Western Mining Corporation. However, by 1941 those operators left on the field had disposed of most of their machinery and abandoned their leases.

In 1947 prospecting recommenced for alluvial gold and bismuth, and alluvial gold was treated in new plant installed by L.F. White.

== Description ==
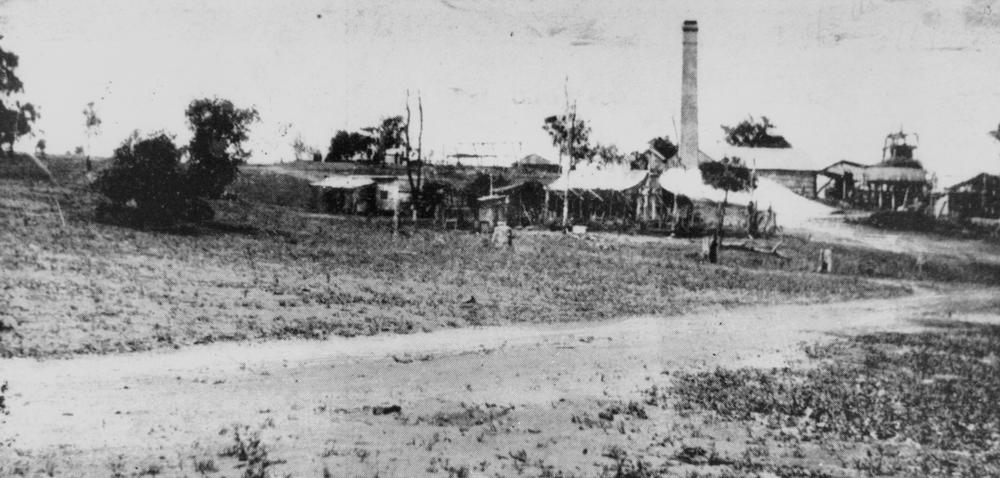
Barclay's Battery and Mill, Mount Coolon, 1932

The place extends from the northern perimeter of Mount Coolon township, northeast along Police Creek to include the weir and the former Hammond house. The mill site includes a square brick chimney, concrete foundations of a 10 head stamp battery, two mortar boxes, gas producer, two-cylinder gas engine (partly demolished), one-cylinder Crossley engine, ball mill and a steel vat. Timber, stone and concrete foundations of the cyanide plant are located south of the mill, closer to the Mount Coolon Hotel.

The machinery consists of:

- One-cylinder gas engine with flywheel - Crossley Brothers Limited Manchester (cylinder block removed)
- Mortar box - Hudson Brothers Engineers Clyde N.S.W. 1897
- Mortar box - Walkers Limited
- Two-cylinder cross compound gas engine and flywheel (not intact)
- Ball mill
- Gas producer.

== Heritage listing ==
Barclay's Battery was listed on the Queensland Heritage Register on 17 May 2004 having satisfied the following criteria.

The place is important in demonstrating the evolution or pattern of Queensland's history.

Barclay's Battery is located within the Mount Coolon goldfield. The remaining structures and features demonstrate the evolution of the gold-mining industry in north Queensland, including the growth, upgrading of operations, and subsequent company takeovers often associated with early mining endeavours, through to the eventual decline of operations at this isolated location in 1941.

The place demonstrates rare, uncommon or endangered aspects of Queensland's cultural heritage.

The battery site comprises a brick chimney, ball mill, stamp mill remains, and rare cross compound gas engine which demonstrate some of the machinery functions of mining operations that were carried out at Mount Coolon.

The place has a strong or special association with a particular community or cultural group for social, cultural or spiritual reasons.

The battery is associated with the isolated mining community of Mount Coolon and several important historical events in Queensland's history. Mount Coolon is well known for a multiple murder-suicide in 1918, following a claim-jumping incident leading to a mining court case and unsuccessful appeal, the tragic results of which attracted Australia-wide attention. Mining operations at Barclay's and the rest of Mount Coolon goldfield are also significant as they are associated with important aspects of Queensland industrial relations history, with a six-month strike in 1935 revealing many of the difficulties and tensions associated with isolated mining operations in semi-arid regions.
