= Eucalyptus tardecidens =

Scientific classification
- Kingdom: Plantae
- Clade: Tracheophytes
- Clade: Angiosperms
- Clade: Eudicots
- Clade: Rosids
- Order: Myrtales
- Family: Myrtaceae
- Genus: Eucalyptus
- Species: E. tardecidens

Binomial name
- Eucalyptus tardecidens (L.A.S.Johnson & K.D.Hill) A.R.Bean

Species of eucalyptus

Eucalyptus tardecidens is a species of mallee or small tree that is endemic to north Queensland. It has rough, fibrous or flaky bark on the trunk and branches, lance-shaped adult leaves, flower buds in groups of seven, white flowers and shortened oval to cylindrical fruit.

== Description ==
Eucalyptus tardecidens is a mallee or a tree that typically grows to a height of 7 m (23 ft) and forms a lignotuber. It has mottled grey flaky to fibrous bark on the trunk and branches. Young plants and coppice regrowth have dull green, broadly lance-shaped leaves that are about 85 mm (3.3 in) long, 30 mm (1.2 in) wide and petiolate. Adult leaves are the same shade of green on both sides, lance-shaped, 75–150 mm (3.0–5.9 in) long and 8–21 mm (0.31–0.83 in) wide on a petiole 10–15 mm (0.39–0.59 in) long. The flower buds are arranged on the ends of the branchlets in groups of seven on a branching peduncle 5–12 mm (0.20–0.47 in) wide, the individual buds on pedicels 3.5–6 mm (0.14–0.24 in) long. Mature buds are oval to pear-shaped, 4.5–6 mm (0.18–0.24 in) long and about 3 mm (0.12 in) wide with a conical to hemispherical operculum. Flowering occurs from October to February and the flowers are white. The fruit is a woody oval to cylindrical capsule about 5 mm (0.20 in) long and 4 mm (0.16 in) wide with the valves below rim level.

== Taxonomy and naming ==
This eucalypt was first formally described in 1991 by Lawrie Johnson and Ken Hill in the journal Telopea from specimens collecte near Mount Carbine. They gave it the name Eucalyptus persistens subsp. tardecidens. In 2000, Anthony Bean raised the subspecies to species status as E. tardecidens in the journal Austrobaileya and the change has been accepted by the Australian Plant Census. The specific epithet is derived from Latin words meaning "tardily" and "falling", referring to the shedding of the outer operculum.

== Distribution and habitat ==
Eucalyptus tardecidens is found on the Cape York Peninsula between Lakeland Downs and to the south of Mount Carbine where it grows in dry woodland.

== Conservation status ==
This eucalypt is classified as "least concern" under the Queensland Government Nature Conservation Act 1992.

== See also ==
- List of Eucalyptus species
