= William Lakeland =

Australian explorer and prospector

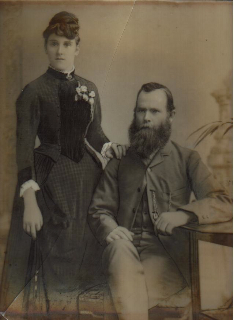
William and Esther Lakeland, circa 1889

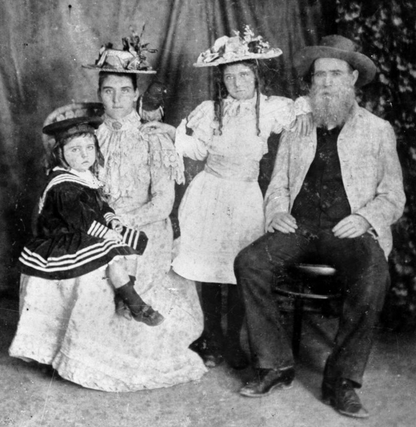
William Lakeland and family. Family members from left to right: Leo Percy Bruno (1897–1963); Esther Margaret Lakeland (née Culton) (1868–1949); Claudie Ethel May Lakeland (1889–1966) and William Lakeland (1847–1921)

William Lakeland (c. 1847-1921) was an Australian explorer and prospector in the late 19th and early 20th century.

== Early life ==
William Lakeland was born in May 1847 in Sydney, and christened there at Saint James Parish on 13 May 1847. Some sources indicate that he was born at Rose Bay, Sydney, in 1844.

== Career ==
Like John Dickie (1848–1924), William Robert Sefton (1849–1920), James Mulligan (1836-191 ), Jonas "Billy"Webb (18 -19 ) etc., Lakeland was one of the earliest prospectors, miners and explorers of the Cape York Peninsula. He, together with Joseph Smith Oddy (1834–1889) established Cooktown's first substantial brewery in 1885-6. Lakeland also took up cattle grazing lands on Cape York Peninsula, dabbled in goldfield butchery, and, although never a publican, owned a Cooktown hotel.

=== Palmer and Pascoe Rivers ===
In 1873, Lakeland travelled to prospect the Palmer River together with an associate, Christopher "Christie" Palmerston (circa 1851-189 ) who had been at the Etheridge Goldfield. In the early 1880s Lakeland was a member of another party led by Sefton. The other explorers were Patrick Fox, Edward Cox, Henry Charles Goodenough, George Brown, Hugh Lockhart, James Watson Henry Miller and two sailors, absconders from their ship berthed at Cooktown. They had 70 head of horses and provisions for three months. The aim of the venture was to explore and prospect that terrain around the head of the Pascoe River, then over the coastal ranges dividing the Pascoe basin from the watershed of Lloyd Bay. They would also traverse the country to the east of the Tozer Range. Good pastoral and timber lands were also sought, especially by Sefton, Cox, Fox and Lakeland. To date the party found nothing but the merest traces of gold and tin together with hostile natives. By 1 April 1881 Coen was three weeks in their wake. Payable gold was finally located in the Lockhart basin by Hughie Lockhart. Some five weeks were spent working alluvial gold. In the course of the expedition which took them from the Lockhart country to the Pascoe River and Lloyd Bay and on to the Batavia River, which was renamed the Wenlock, they saw and worked gold, experienced spear attacks, and all but made their fortunes. They discovered a wolfram load. Unfortunately they were too early. It would come to be a most valuable commodity, but at that time it was of very little value. Traces of gold were found at the Batavia but in 1892 Romeo, a native, and Louis Duval and French Canadian, both members of William Thomson Baird's party found rich alluvial gold which caused a rush from Cooktown and Coen. Lakeland was one of the first on the scene with his friends John Dickie (1848–1924) and William Bowden (18 -1909).

=== Coen River ===
In August 1876, Lakeland was a member of the Sefton-led party of fifteen well-provisioned and armed prospectors bound for the Coen River. This band included Samuel Graves Irwin Verge (18 -1, James Dick (1849–1916), Richard Melville Goodfellow (1839–1913) Henry Stuckey, and other. Other than for Brady's party that fell on hard times, this was the first venture on which gold in payable quantities was discovered in that region. Stuart and McDonald while of that party were speared to death, while Lakeland was speared in the neck and arm. Several parties, soon after, won further gold and a rush to the Coen set in 1878.

Primary source records show that in 18 years up until 1892 William Lakeland undertook 10 major prospecting and exploration ventures.

=== Rocky River ===
Lakeland's most notable achievement was the discovery, together with J R Evans and N Nichols, of the Rocky River (alluvial) Goldfield which lay about 16 km. from the mouth of the Chester River, and about 30 km. east-north-east of Coen. When the Cooktown Courier of 22 September 1893 reported that news received from the Warden's Court advised that Warden Chester had received a telegram from Lakeland, Nichols and Evans applying for a prospecting area on Rocky Creek then a rush set in. When the alluvial gold started to wane Lakeland and party discovered reef gold in the area of Leo Creek, so named for William's son Leo Percy Bruno 1897–1966. Lakeland and party applied for a reward claim in June 1896. The field was officially gazetted on 25 August 1897.

=== Later discoveries ===
Lakeland discovered the Hamilton River and the Claudie River rising in the Janet Range and flowing south-easterly into Lloyd Bay. The Claudie was named for his daughter Claudie Ethel May Lakeland, later Mrs Hodges (1889–1963). He assisted the Victorian-born Surveyor John Thomas Embley in his work on Cape York Peninsula in the period 1884–1885. When the Hodgkinson goldfield broke out in 1876 it was not long before it was realised that an alternative wagon haul route was required to link the coast. The one from Smithfield was totally impracticable due to its steepness and distance. With Christie Palmerston, Lakeland marked a track from the Hodgkinson Goldfield to what is now Port Douglas.

In 1892 he, in company with William Bowden and John Dickie, located wolfram between the Pascoe River and Canoe Creek, later called Bowden Field. (In 1887 John Dickie had previously located wolfram there.) The Lakeland, Dickie, Bowden find expanded the deposit and when wolfram soared in value George Brown and party, using a sketch map drawn by Bowden, went to the region and found further deposits. They brought Bill Bowden in on things and he became the principal exporter. The field was named the Bowden Mineral Field.

== Death ==
Lakeland died in the winter of 1921. He was returning from a previously located gold deposit, which would be named, in 1934, the Iron Range. Its rediscovery by John "Jack" Gordon, Lawrence Clarence Millar and Robert Woolstancraft would ignite a rush and make some men very rich. Lakeland had not been well, experiencing stomach troubles for sometime. In September, on the first branch of the Pascoe River he met Willie Fox, a sandalwood cutter. He told Fox he was going to collect stones (gold specimens) about the head of the Pascoe River before going back to Coen. He said he was feeling sick and had a soreness in his stomach for which he was taking salts. Fox was the last person to see Lakeland alive.

On 24 January 1922, while grazier and Coen publican Herbert James Thompson and his native stockmen were mustering cattle on the Hull River, three horses were spotted about half a mile below the junction of Attack Creek and the Hull River. They were recognised as belonging to William Lakeland. At a point about a mile down the Hull on the north bank Thompson located a pack cover and a blanket lying on the ground. Up river, where the horses were first spotted, a riding saddle and halter were found on the low bank of the river. The next day, Thursday 26 January 1922, Tommy Shephard found Lakeland's skull on the north bank of the Hull River about a mile below the junction of attack Creek. Other body parts were also located. When the police, who had been advised of the find, arrived, the remains were buried on the spot. A saddle, other articles and human remains were found in 1923.

== Commemoration ==
It was not until almost thirty years following his death that he was commemorated. A granite headstone was brought up from Brisbane. Newspaperman John McDonald Hardcastle considered that Lakeland deserved more than a blaze on a remote bloodwood tree as a memorial. The stone was shipped from Brisbane to Cooktown and then railed to Coen. From Coen it was loaded onto a Thornycroft truck and carried as far as the vehicle could travel. It now had to be transported over some of the roughest country in the state. Police Sergeant Leslie Chelmsford Kahler, with the help of others, manoeuvred the granite slab many miles by means of a horse-drawn bush-sled made from the forked limb of a tree. On 5 January 1950 the headstone was cemented into place, a rail put around it, a small ceremony was held and photos were taken by the police.

His widow, Esther Margaret, née Culton, born at Toowoomba, died at Cooktown in 1949.

The town of Lakeland, Queensland is named after him.
