= Nuggety Gully Water Race and Chinese Camp =

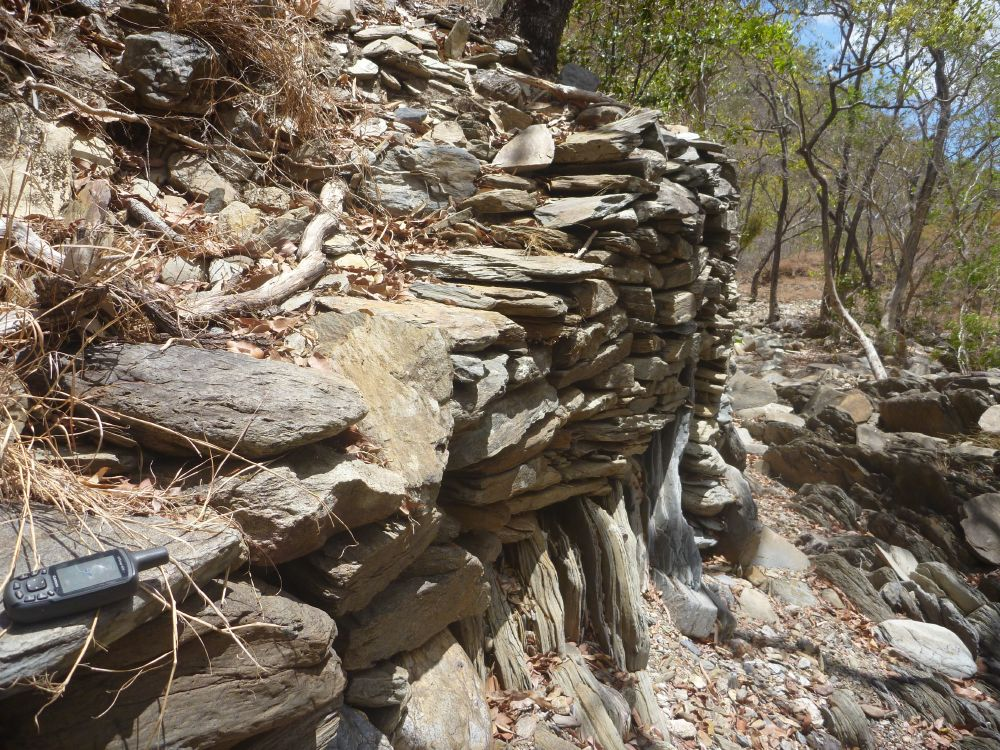
- Stone retaining walls at Nuggety Gully, 2014 (mobile phone in lower left for scale)

- Location within Queensland Location within Australia
- 15.9776°S 144.9328°E
- Location: Mareeba Mining District, Lakeland, Shire of Cook, Queensland, Australia

History
- Design period: 1870s - 1890s (late 19th century)
- Built: c. 1878 - c. 1886

Queensland Heritage Register
- Official name: Nuggety Gully Water Race and Chinese Camp, Greasy Bill Creek water race, Prospect Creek Stone Walls, Star of Normanby Mine
- Type: state heritage (built, archaeological)
- Designated: 21 October 1992
- Reference no.: 600426
- Significant period: c. 1878-c. 1886 (fabric)
- Significant components: terracing, shaft, water race, fireplace, mine - open cut, wall/s - retaining

Nuggety Gully Water Race and Chinese Camp is a heritage-listed mining camp at Mareeba Mining District, Lakeland, Shire of Cook, Queensland, Australia. It was built from c. 1878 to c. 1886. It is also known as Greasy Bill Creek water race, Prospect Creek Stone Walls, and Star of Normanby Mine. It was added to the Queensland Heritage Register on 21 October 1992.

== History ==
Gold was first discovered "officially" in the West Normanby River area, southwest of Cooktown, in November 1874. The first official figures estimate that by the end of January 1875, over 600 men were on the field, many from Maytown. At this point no Chinese appear to have been allowed (by Mining Warden Philip Frederic Sellheim) to enter the diggings. However, by February 1878, at least 200 Chinese were reported to be working the alluvials.

In May 1886 Mining Warden Howard Saint George visited the diggings and reported 34 Europeans working the reefs and thirty to forty Chinese employed exclusively in alluvial workings and in gardening. There were three gardens principally devoted to maize, for which there was a ready sale at the reefs.

In 1898 R. L. Jack, the Government Geologist, took a hurried look at the reefs long after most of the diggings had been abandoned. His map shows Chinese camps in the district but not at Nuggety Gully, between "Prospector's Gully" and the Star of Normanby reef. Therefore, it is likely that the retaining walls and terraced camp site were constructed between 1878 (the heyday of early mining) and 1886.

== Description ==
Nuggety Gully is a deep ravine with a dry rocky watercourse which drains into Prospect (originally Prospector's) Creek The place includes a series of stone-pitched retaining walls that extend intermittently along Nuggety Gully for a distance of 600 metres (2,000 ft) north of the Prospect Creek junction from co-ordinates 15.58.53 S - 144.55.54 E to 15.58.37 S - 144.55.56 E. The retaining walls are constructed predominantly on the western side of the Gully. On some bends they are constructed on both sides of the creek, and in two or more tiers. The narrowest sections of the creek between retaining walls are about 2 metres (6 ft 7 in) in width. The walls vary from 1 to 2 metres (3 ft 3 in to 6 ft 7 in) in height.

The Star of Normanby gold mine workings, comprising a small open cut and a caved shaft, extend across Nuggety Gully about 300 metres (980 ft) north of Prospect Creek and are in direct association with the retaining walls.

A Chinese settlement site is located on Prospect Creek at its junction with Nuggety Gully. The site comprises nine small earth terraces, several containing stone edging and two containing fireplaces. The larger stone fireplace or oven has recently been partially reconstructed and sticks have been placed across the top. This structure has been wrongly described in a nomination to the Australian Heritage Commission for entry on the Register of the National Estate as "a fort in which Chinese miners hid from attacking Aborigines and fired on them".

== Heritage listing ==
Nuggety Gully Water Race and Chinese Camp was listed on the Queensland Heritage Register on 21 October 1992 having satisfied the following criteria.

The place is important in demonstrating the evolution or pattern of Queensland's history.

The Nuggety Gully stone-pitched retaining walls and Chinese camp are significant in Queensland's history as the finest and most extensive surviving example of Chinese stonework.

The place demonstrates rare, uncommon or endangered aspects of Queensland's cultural heritage.

The direct associations of stone retaining walls, Chinese camp sites and conventional mine workings is exceptional.

The place has potential to yield information that will contribute to an understanding of Queensland's history.

Further archaeological and archival investigation could yield information on the extent of Chinese activities and involvement in the Star of Normanby mine area.

The place is important in demonstrating the principal characteristics of a particular class of cultural places.

The quality of the stonework is significant and it has remained intact due to the broken nature of the country and the difficulties in achieving vehicle access, discouraging subsequent attempts at remining.
