= Epping Forest National Park =

National park in Queensland, Australia

- IUCN category Ia (strict nature reserve)
- Location within Queensland
- Location: Queensland
- Nearest city: Clermont
- Coordinates: 22°21′06″S 146°42′05″E
- Area: 31.60 km^{2} (12.20 sq mi)
- Established: 1971
- Governing body: Queensland Parks and Wildlife Service

Epping Forest is a national park in Queensland, Australia, 855 km northwest of Brisbane. The park is a scientific national park so it is not open to the public. Only scientists, rangers and volunteers may visit the park. The park lies within the Brigalow Belt North bioregion. It is within the Drummond Basin geological basin and the Belyando River water catchment area. The park was established to protect a critically endangered species of wombat, the northern hairy-nosed wombat (Lasiorhinus krefftii), the world's largest burrowing herbivore.

Restricted access is used to ensure Epping Forest remains very much undisturbed as it is the sole remaining natural habitat of the northern hairy-nosed wombat. The last census of the animal, undertaken in 2007, estimated there was a population of about 138 of the species. In the 1970s the population was estimated to have reached a low of somewhere between 20 and 30 wombats.

Most of the park is eucalypt woodland with patches of sandy soils that are used by the wombats for burrowing.

The wildlife in the park consists of 251 species of animals and 103 species of plants.

The elevation of the terrain in Epping Forest Park is 230 metres.

== See also ==
- Protected areas of Queensland
