= Mount Coolon, Queensland =

Mount Coolon
- Town
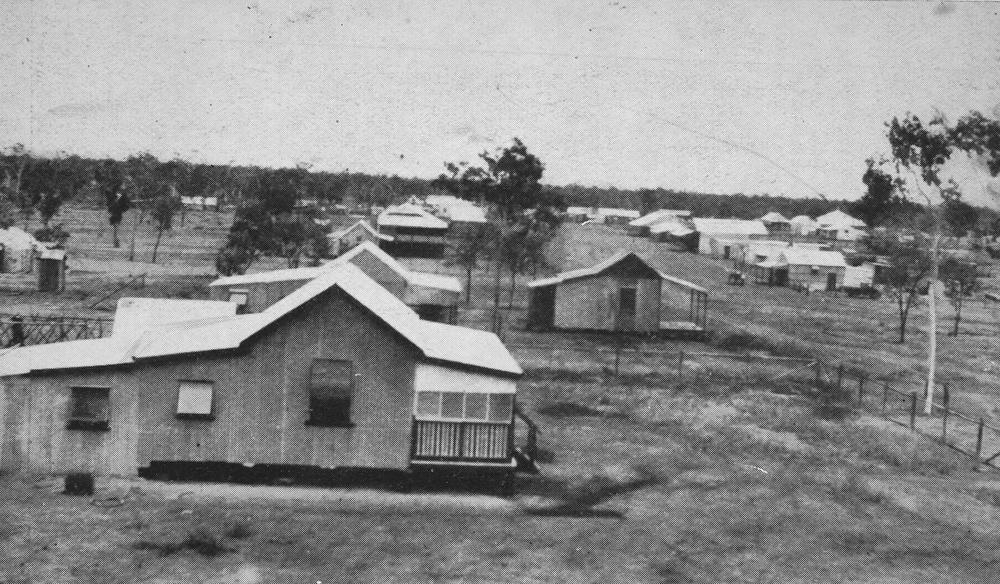
- Town of Mount Coolon, 1932

- Interactive map of Mount Coolon
- Coordinates: 21.3838°S 147.3413°E
- Country: Australia
- State: Queensland
- LGA: Whitsunday Region
- Location: 156 km (97 mi) W of Glenden; 210 km (130 mi) SW of Bowen; 271 km (168 mi) SW of Proserpine; 287 km (178 mi) W of Mackay; 1,147 km (713 mi) NW of Brisbane

Government
  - State electorate: Burdekin
  - Federal division: Capricornia

Area
  - Total: 6,081.0 km^{2} (2,347.9 sq mi)

Population
  - Total: 172 (2021 census)
  - Density: 0.02828/km^{2} (0.07326/sq mi)
- Time zone: UTC+10:00 (AEST)
- Postcode: 4804
Localities around Mount Coolon
Seventy Mile	Mount Wyatt	Newlands
Llanarth	Mount Coolon	Suttor
Belyando	Pasha	Eaglefield

Mount Coolon is a rural town and locality in the Whitsunday Region, Queensland, Australia. In the 2021 census, the locality of Mount Coolon had a population of 172 people.

== Geography ==
The Suttor River rises here. The river marks part of the eastern and all of the southern and western boundaries of Mount Coolon. The Sellheim River forms a small section of the northern border. The landscape is dotted with many waterholes and numerous peaks belonging to the Leichhardt Range.

Mount Coolon has the following mountains:

- Beaucazon Peak (21.0811°S 147.0009°E) 291 metres (955 ft)
- Bulgonunna Peak (21.2932°S 147.5396°E) 516 metres (1,693 ft)
- Bungobine Peak (21.0731°S 147.3634°E) 358 metres (1,175 ft)
- Carey Guille (20.9925°S 147.0093°E) 374 metres (1,227 ft)
- Mount Carmel (21.3129°S 147.1947°E) 290 metres (950 ft)
- Mount Douglas (21.4008°S 146.9154°E) 279 metres (915 ft)
- Mount Harry Marsh (21.1798°S 147.1890°E) 375 metres (1,230 ft)
- Mount Kroman (21.1533°S 146.9857°E) 345 metres (1,132 ft)
- Mount Loudon (21.1143°S 147.3434°E) 418 metres (1,371 ft)
- Mount Manaman (21.4253°S 147.3492°E) 350 metres (1,150 ft)
- Mount Patterson (21.2140°S 147.4122°E) 430 metres (1,410 ft)
- Mount Tindale (20.9686°S 147.3196°E) 426 metres (1,398 ft)
- Norcot Peak (21.0909°S 146.9968°E) 294 metres (965 ft)
- Rodborough Hill (21.0328°S 147.0380°E) 296 metres (971 ft)
- Scartwater Hill (21.0877°S 146.8673°E) 196 metres (643 ft)
- The Tor (21.0363°S 146.9014°E) 224 metres (735 ft)
- Whitestone Peak (20.9815°S 147.4658°E) 425 metres (1,394 ft)

== History ==
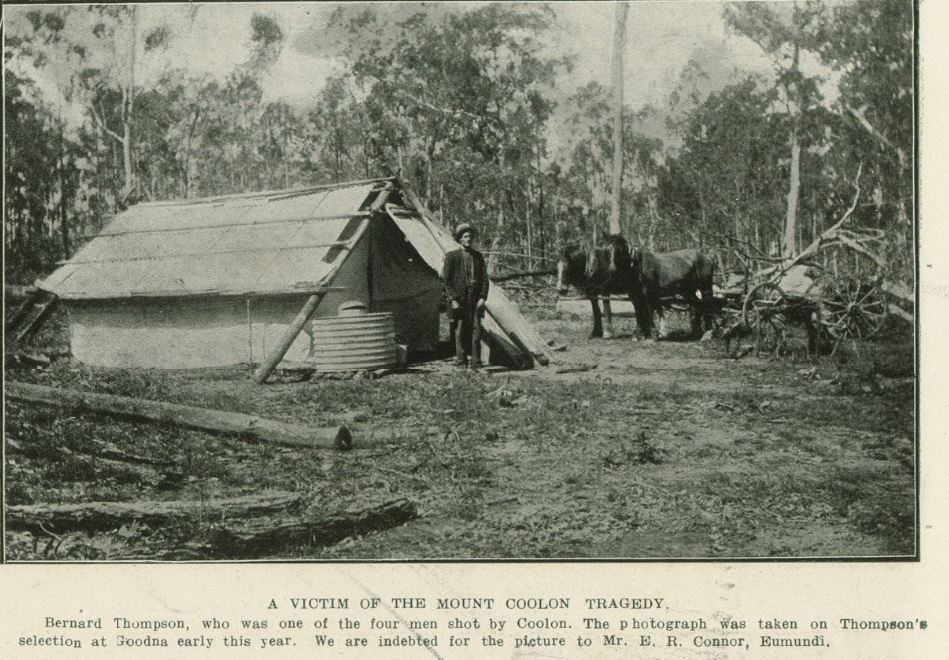
Bernard Thompson at Goodna, one of the four men shot and killed by Thomas Coolon at Mount Coolon, 1918

Mount Coolon was originally called Koala, and was founded on Yangga tribal lands. It was renamed after Thomas Coolon, a prospector.

In 1918, following a claims dispute, Coolon shot and killed four men, then committed suicide.

Koala Provisional School opened on 11 July 1921. On 1 September 1925, it became Koala State School. In 1946, it was renamed Mount Coolon State School in 1946. It closed in 1950, but reopened in 1962. It finally closed on 30 April 1971.

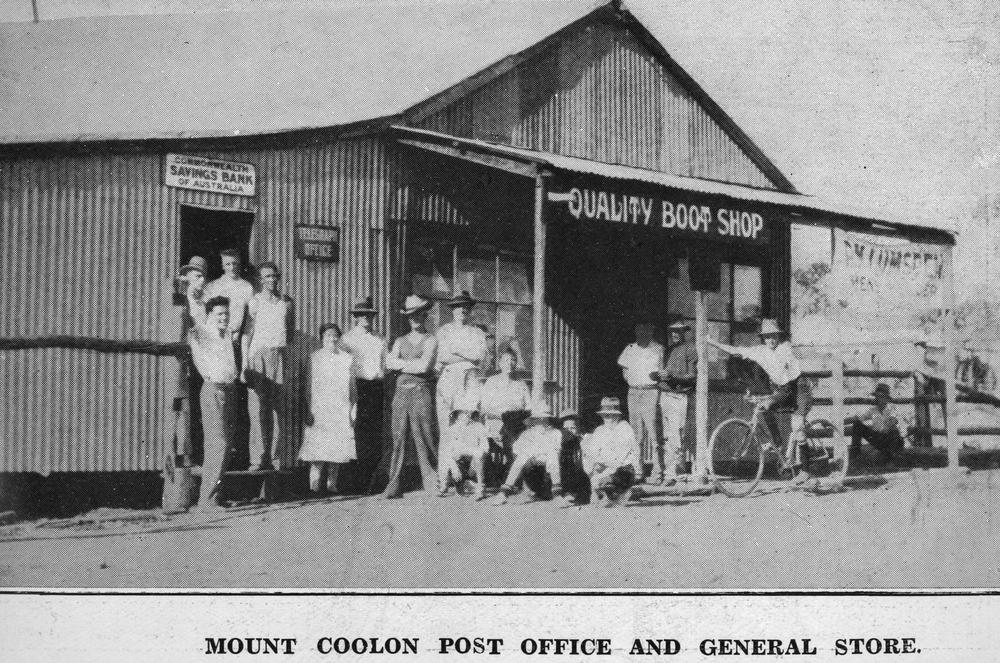
Mount Coolon Post Office and General Store, 1932

Mount Coolon Post Office opened on 1 May 1925 (a receiving office had been open from 1922) and closed in 1984.

Koala police station opened in 1925 and was renamed Mount Coolon police station in 1931. It closed in 1967. 18 police officers served at the station over its lifetime.

Between 1925 and 1967 when the station closed there were 18 officers stationed at Mt Coolon.

== Demographics ==
In the 2011 census, the locality of Mount Coolon had a population of 567 people.

In the 2016 census, the locality of Mount Coolon had a population of 64 people.

In the 2021 census, the locality of Mount Coolon had a population of 172 people.

== Heritage listings ==
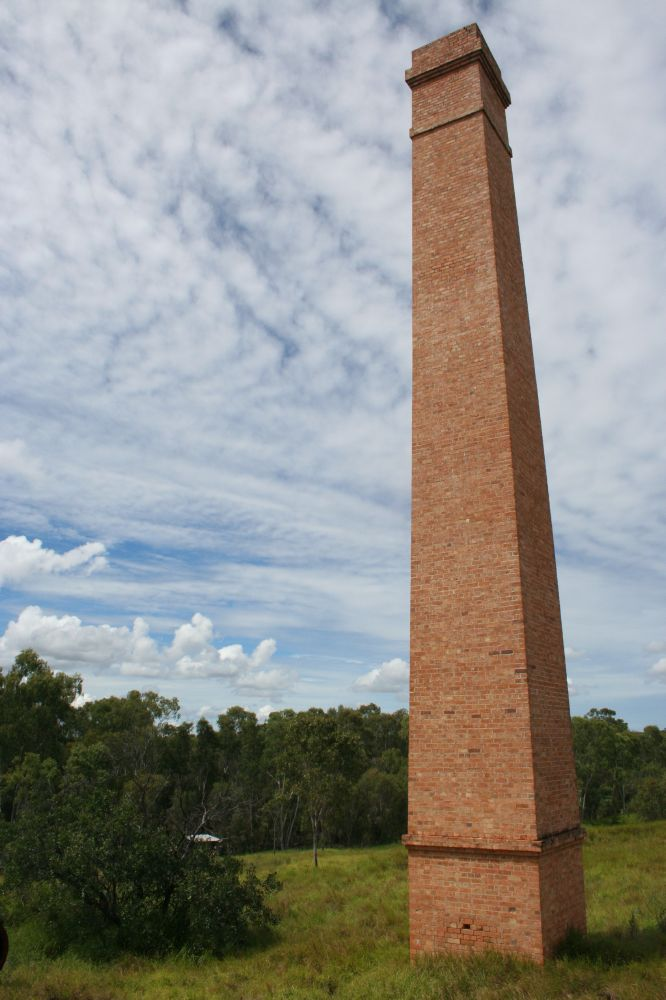
Chimney, Barclay's Battery

Mount Coolon has a number of heritage-listed sites, including:

- Barclay's Battery, Collinsville road (21.3836°S 147.3415°E)
- Suttor River Causeway on the Old Bowen Downs Road, St Annes Road (21.225°S 146.9126°E)

== Education ==
There are no schools in Mount Coolon. Glenden State School in Glenden to the east is the nearest government primary and secondary school; however, the distances involved in a daily commute mean that distance education and boarding schools are other options.

== Amenities ==
Mount Coolon Hotel is at 1 Mill Street. It provides meals and accommodation.

The former Mount Coolon State School is now the Mount Coolon Community Centre.
