= Butcher's Hill (cattle station) =

Area in Australia 1800s

Butchers Hill is the name of the area where a historic cattle station in Far North Queensland, Australia operated during the late 1800s.

The location of the cattle station in relation to the goldfields made it possible to supply meat to local miners and to Cooktown.

Australian history traditionally would refer to Butcher's Hill as a landmark for describing places and locations. This was before the modern town of Lakeland became more well known and established. Passerby's would stay and lodge at the station.

There are various historic photos with James Earl (grazier) and others that been preserved which assist to gain an understanding into the history of Australian and Australian farming life.

== History ==
James Earl (grazier) moved to the area now called Lakeland where he was originally granted a lease to occupy pastoral land.

Butchers Hill, Cattle Station, Queensland was named after Butcher Hill Farm in Littleport, Cambridgeshire, England where Earl lived prior to coming to Melbourne in the gold rush era.

There are newspaper references to the station as well as the location, one reference was to a large cattle sale to be paddocked at Mareeba from Butchers Hill Station.

A local school was originally named after this station called “Butcher's Hill State School”. The school opened on 23 August 1969 with the first teacher named Lorraine Woergoetter. Within two years the school was renamed Lakeland Downs State School.
