= Belyando River =

Belyando Belyando River (Western Branch)
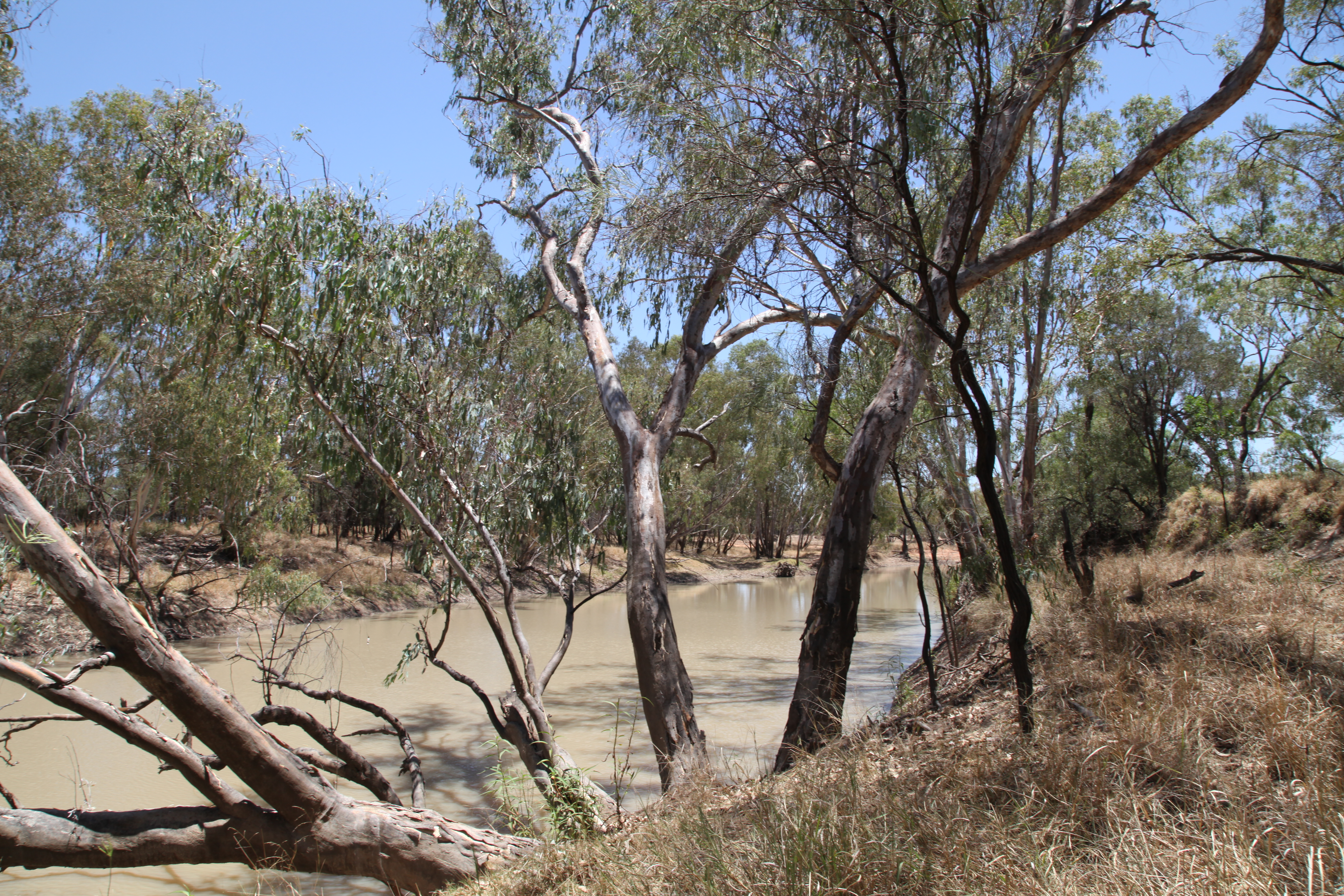
- The Belyando River, in 2012

- Location of Belyando River mouth in Queensland

Location
- Country: Australia
- State: Queensland
- Region: Central Queensland

Physical characteristics
- Source: Drummond Range
  - location: below Mount Narounya
  - coordinates: 24°02′49″S 147°09′27″E
  - elevation: 397 m (1,302 ft)
- 2nd source: Belyando River (Western Branch)
  - location: west of Lochington
  - coordinates: 23°55′56″S 147°02′21″E
  - elevation: 447 m (1,467 ft)
- Mouth: confluence with the Suttor River
  - location: Lake Dalrymple
  - coordinates: 21°25′26″S 146°53′8″E
  - elevation: 179 m (587 ft)
- Length: 1,054 km (655 mi)
- Basin size: 35,000 km^{2} (14,000 sq mi)

Basin features
- River system: Burdekin River
- Tributaries
  - left: Carmichael River
- National parks: Narrien Range National Park; Epping Forest National Park

The Belyando River, including the Belyando River (Western Branch), is a river system in Central Queensland, Australia. At 1,054 kilometres (655 mi) in length and with a catchment area of 35,000 square kilometres (14,000 sq mi), the Belyando River system is one of the longest rivers in Queensland.

It is pronounced Bel-yando.

== Course and features ==
Comprising a mix of anabranches from source to mouth, the Belyando River and the Belyando River (Western Branch) rise below Mount Narounyah in the Drummond Range, part of the Great Dividing Range in the area southeast of Alpha. The river flows generally in a northerly direction, joined by twenty-nine tributaries including the Carmichael River. The Belyando River flows through a series of waterholes and lagoons including Grays Lagoon, Bakoolama Waterhole, Ten Mile Waterhole, Boadles Waterhole, Georges Waterhole, Broadna Waterhole, Alinya Waterhole, Sandy Camp Waterhole, Bygana Waterhole, Dunjarrobina Waterhole and Yarmina Waterhole. The river reaches its confluence with the Suttor River before flowing into Lake Dalrymple and joining the Burdekin River. The river system descends from a peak elevation of 447 metres (1,467 ft) over its combined 1,054-kilometre (655 mi) course.

The river system has a catchment area of a little more than 35,000 square kilometres (14,000 sq mi). Land use in the catchment is dominated by grazing with some cropping. Some of the catchment is included in the Narrien Range National Park and the Epping Forest National Park.

== History ==
The traditional custodians of the land surrounding the Belyando River are the various indigenous Wakelbura people, including the various smaller Auanbura, Dorobura, and Metherabura clans.

Miyan (also known as Mian) is a language of North/Central Queensland.The Miyan language region includes the landscape within the local government area of the Central Highlands Region, including the localities of Mount Douglas, Bulliwallah and Lake Galilee.

Yagalingu (also known as Jagalingu, Auanbura, Kokleburra, Owanburra, Kowanburra, Wagalbara, and Djagalingu) is an Australian Aboriginal language of Central Queensland. Its traditional language region was within the local government area of Isaac Region, from the headwaters of the Belyando River south to Avoca, north to Laglan, west to the Great Dividing Range, and east and south to Drummond Range.

The first European to discover the river was explorer Thomas Mitchell in 1846 on his fourth and last expedition.

In 1935 the newspaper article about the Yacamunda Station referred to the displacement of the Belyando tribe of Aboriginal people because of noise from airplanes near Rockhampton.

The 2010–11 Queensland floods caused widespread flooding along the river and the extended isolation of properties from inundation which needed food supply drops.

In 2015 the Adani Group applied for a water licence to extract up to 12.5 gigalitres (2.75×10^{9} imp gal; 3.30×10^{9} US gal) per year from the Belyando River for use at the Carmichael coal mine.

== See also ==
- List of rivers of Australia § Queensland
