= Strathmore Station =

Pastoral lease in Queensland

Coordinates: 17.861°S 142.559°E

Location in Queensland

Strathmore Station is a pastoral lease that operates as a cattle station in Queensland. The station is the largest single pastoral lease in the state.

== Geography ==
The property is situated approximately 50 kilometres (31 mi) north east of Croydon and 120 kilometres (75 mi) east of Normanton.

Strathmore occupies an area of 9,310 square kilometres (3,595 sq mi) and is situated between the Staaten and Einasleigh Rivers in the Cape York area. It is capable of carrying over 50,000 head of cattle and is currently running Droughtmaster-Brahman cross breeders.

== History ==
In 1929 the state owned Strathmore was put up for auction and sold for £25,000 to T. Sanderson of Melbourne.

Prior to 1953 Messrs Gilchrist, Watt and Cunningham made the decision to convert the entire herd at Strathmore of 20,000 breeders to poll shorthorns. Bulls from Strathmore commanded record prices in 1953. The owner of the property in 2012 was Scott Harris. Harris lost 860 cattle the same year from cattle duffers who stole the stock while he was attending his own wedding.

Harris was granted a permit to clear and cultivate a 23,100 hectares (57,081 acres) portion of the property to cultivate with sorghum using a water allocation from the Gilbert River.

== See also ==
- List of ranches and stations
- List of the largest stations in Australia
