= Lakeland, Queensland =

Lakeland
- Town
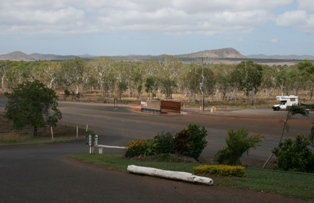
- Lakeland Downs

- Interactive map of Lakeland
- Coordinates: 15.8591°S 144.8566°E
- Country: Australia
- State: Queensland
- LGA: Shire of Cook
- Location: 78.5 km (48.8 mi) SW of Cooktown; 248 km (154 mi) NNW of Cairns; 1,902 km (1,182 mi) NNW of Brisbane

Government
  - State electorate: Cook
  - Federal division: Leichhardt

Area
  - Total: 4,738.0 km^{2} (1,829.4 sq mi)

Population
  - Total: 333 (2021 census)
  - Density: 0.07028/km^{2} (0.18203/sq mi)
- Time zone: UTC+10:00 (AEST)
- Postcode: 4871
Localities around Lakeland
Laura	Cooktown	Rossville
Palmer	Lakeland	Bloomfield; Dedin
Groganville	Hurricane; Desailly	Spurgeon; Mount Carbine

Lakeland is a rural town and locality in the Shire of Cook, Queensland, Australia. In the 2021 census, the locality of Lakeland had a population of 333 people.

== Geography ==
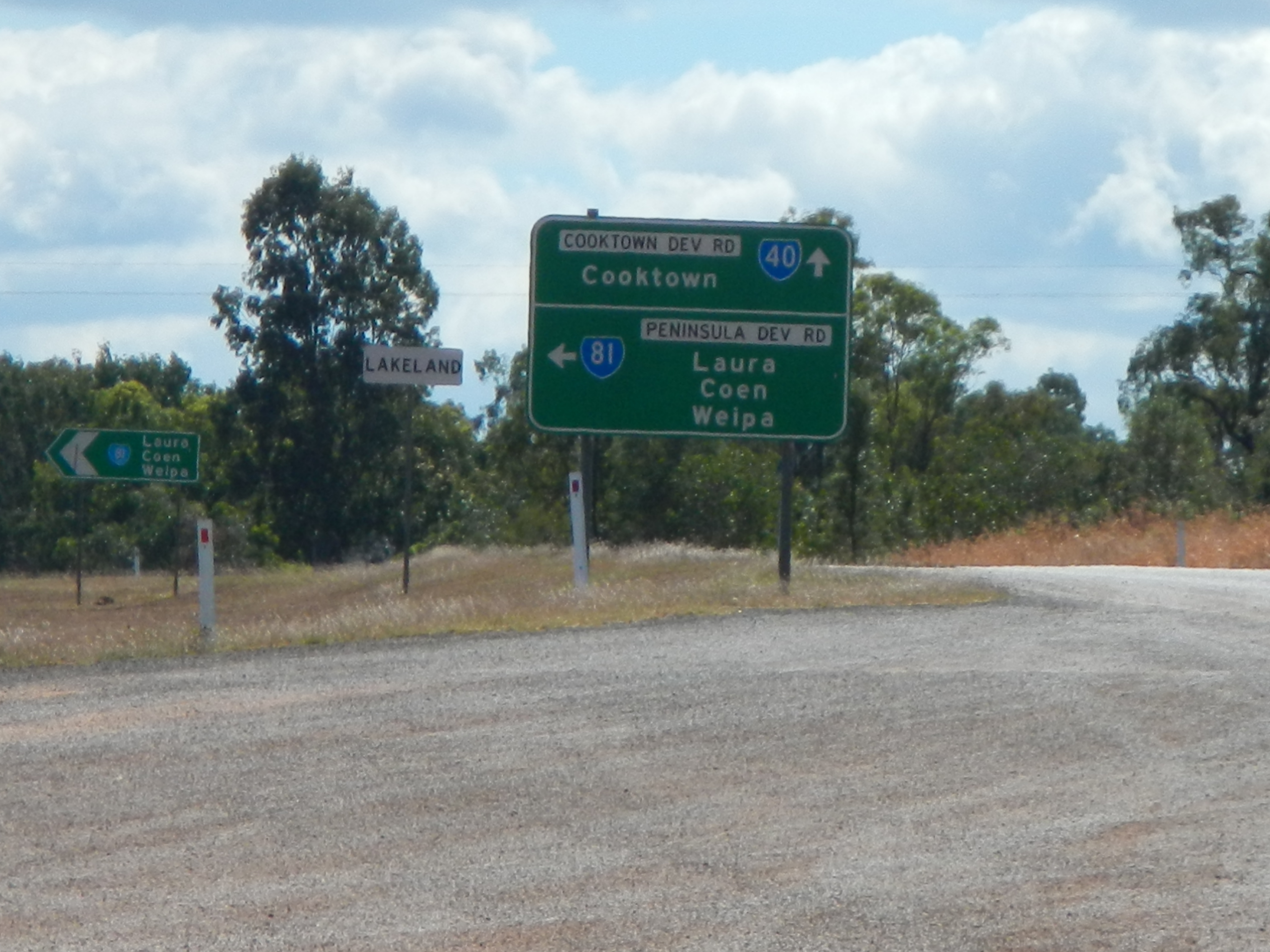
Road signs, 2013

Lakeland is a small farming centre on the Cape York Peninsula. It is at the junction of the main Peninsula Developmental Road (which is paved all the way from Cairns to Lakeland), and the Mulligan Highway (formerly the Cooktown Developmental Road).

An area of basalt in the Lakeland region contains locally significant groundwater supplies which feed numerous springs, and also provides irrigation water and fertile soils for farming.

Lakeland has the following mountains:

- Belle View Peak (15.6644°S 145.0197°E)
- Hamilton Peak (16.0381°S 144.8420°E) 664 metres (2,178 ft)
- Macdonalds Hill (15.9594°S 144.8498°E) 458 metres (1,503 ft)
- Mount Amy (15.9937°S 144.9932°E) 845 metres (2,772 ft)
- Mount Byerley (15.6394°S 145.0414°E) 452 metres (1,483 ft)
- Mount Earl (15.8833°S 144.9143°E) 469 metres (1,539 ft)
- Mount Emily (15.6679°S 145.0675°E) 236 metres (774 ft)
- Mount Eykin (15.9505°S 144.9299°E) 571 metres (1,873 ft)
- Mount Fahey (15.6849°S 145.0348°E) 242 metres (794 ft)
- Mount Gibson (15.9919°S 144.9091°E) 516 metres (1,693 ft)
- Mount Herman (16.0663°S 144.7920°E) 636 metres (2,087 ft)
- Mount Janet (15.8959°S 144.7121°E) 703 metres (2,306 ft)
- Mount Lukin (15.9131°S 144.6744°E) 764 metres (2,507 ft)
- Mount Macdonald (15.6980°S 145.0151°E) 328 metres (1,076 ft)
- Mount Mccormack (15.5859°S 144.9771°E) 492 metres (1,614 ft)
- Mount Mclean (15.9016°S 144.8387°E) 416 metres (1,365 ft)
- Mount Murray (15.9553°S 144.7772°E) 602 metres (1,975 ft)
- Mount Pike (16.0259°S 144.9560°E) 842 metres (2,762 ft)
- Mount Scatterbrain (15.8686°S 144.9051°E) 426 metres (1,398 ft)
- Mount Sellheim (15.7525°S 144.9581°E) 269 metres (883 ft)
- North Sampson Mountain (15.7963°S 145.1741°E) 728 metres (2,388 ft)
- Racecourse Mountain (16.0104°S 144.9995°E) 664 metres (2,178 ft)
- Shields Sugarloaf (15.7198°S 144.9750°E)
- Tandewarrah (15.7190°S 145.1021°E) 474 metres (1,555 ft)
- The Brothers (15.9263°S 144.8526°E) 428 metres (1,404 ft)
- The Twins (15.9076°S 144.9162°E)
- Three Peaks (16.0718°S 144.8221°E)
- Zillman Peak (16.0578°S 144.8740°E) 688 metres (2,257 ft)

== History ==
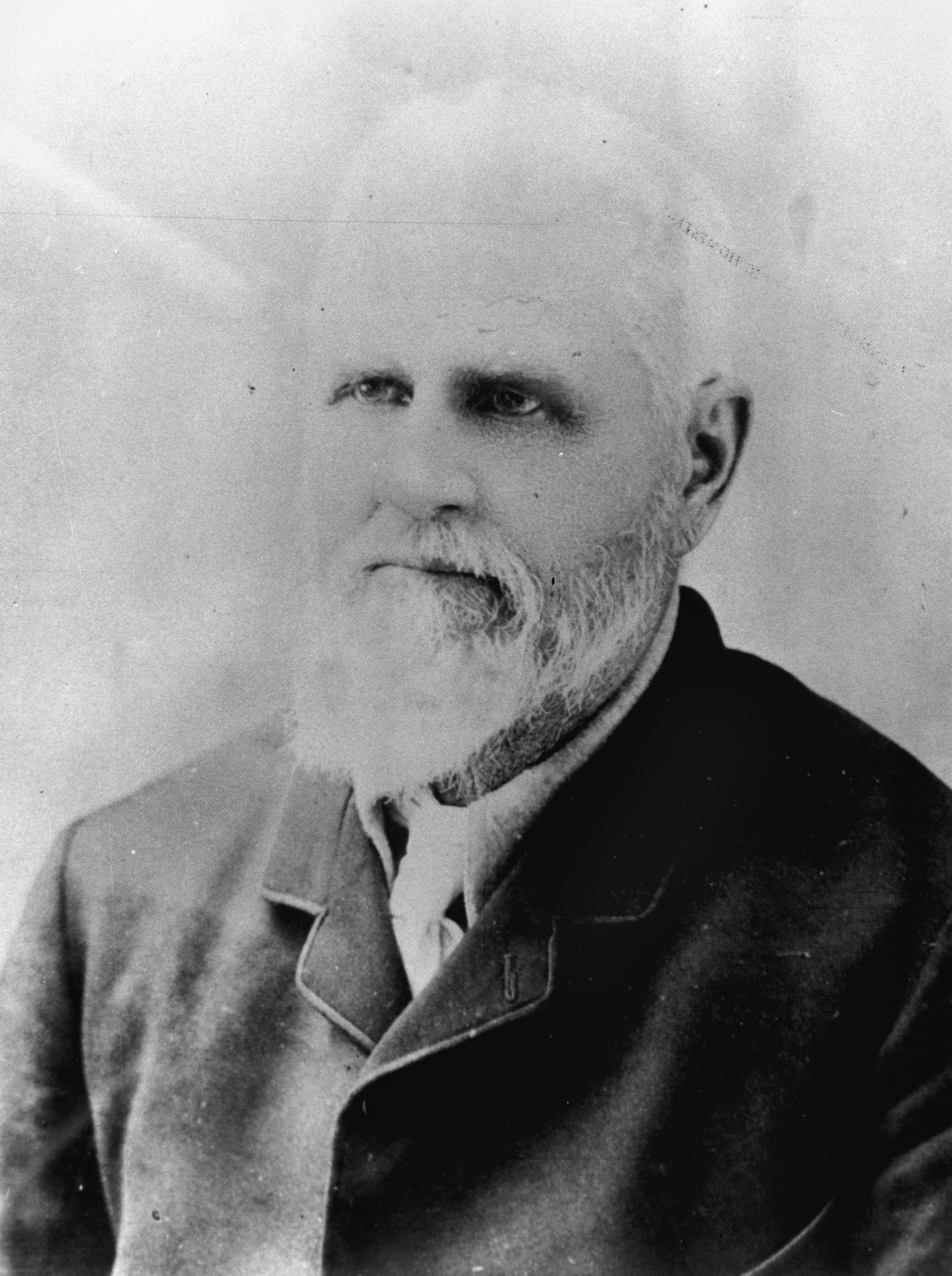
James Earl (24 October 1835 – 14 October 1905) of Butchers Hill, Lakeland.

Yalanji (also known as Kuku Yalanji, Kuku Yalaja, Kuku Yelandji, and Gugu Yalanji) is an Australian Aboriginal language of Far North Queensland. The traditional lands of the Western Yalanji people commence just north of the township of Lakeland and continue southwards past the southern boundary of the locality of Lakeland.

James Earl was granted a lease to occupy pastoral land in March 1877. He named his station Butcher's Hill after Butcher’s Hill Farm in Littleport, Cambridgeshire, England where he lived as a child. It was also known as Turalba Station. The locality was variously known as being in the Cooktown or Laura districts. In September 1899 Earl's daughter Sarah Campbell Earl of Turalba Station married Samuel William Wellington Cook, a part owner of the adjacent Spring Vale Station. These two stations comprise the majority of the current locality of Lakeland.

Mining had commenced on the West Normanby Goldfield by the end of 1874. This goldfield should not be confused with the Normanby Goldfield near Bowen, which opened in 1871. Mining continued intermittently, depending on gold prices, until 1999.

The Normanby Diggings Native Mounted Police camp was located on the West Normanby River just south-east of Butchers Hill and operated for 7 years between 1885 and 1892.

The Normanby Reefs Post Office was renamed Earlton (Earltown) Post Office in 1890. It was closed in December 1892.

Clive J Foyster was an entrepreneur, mining company chief and farmer who bought Butchers Hill in 1968. In a private venture known as Lakeland Downs development began with the clearing of land intended for agriculture, and two irrigation dams were constructed. Dry land and irrigated cropping commenced with plantings of maize and sorghum and later of peanuts and coffee. More intensive cattle grazing also commenced. Eventually 70,000 acres (28,000 hectares) were cleared. In the 1980s Lakeland Downs was sold, divided into freehold farms averaging about 990 acres (400 ha).

Lakeland Downs is named for William (Billy) Lakeland who was one of the earliest prospectors of Cape York Peninsula. The township of Lakeland Downs came into being to service this development, and is now known as Lakeland.

Butcher's Hill State School opened on 23 August 1969. The first teacher was Lorraine Woergoetter. Within two years it had been renamed Lakeland Downs State School.

St Mary Queen of Peace Chapel, a non-denominational chapel, was opened on 3 July 2025 by Bishop Joe Caddy and Father Dariusz Osinski, both from the Catholic Diocese of Cairns. It was built by the local farmers, Peter and Francis Inderbitzin on Mount Mclean, for use by their many Tongan farm workers, who desired a dedicated place for Christian worship.

== Demographics ==
In the 2011 census, the locality of Lakeland had a population of 227 people.

In the 2016 census, the locality of Lakeland had a population of 299 people.

In the 2021 census, the locality of Lakeland had a population of 333 people.

== Heritage listings ==
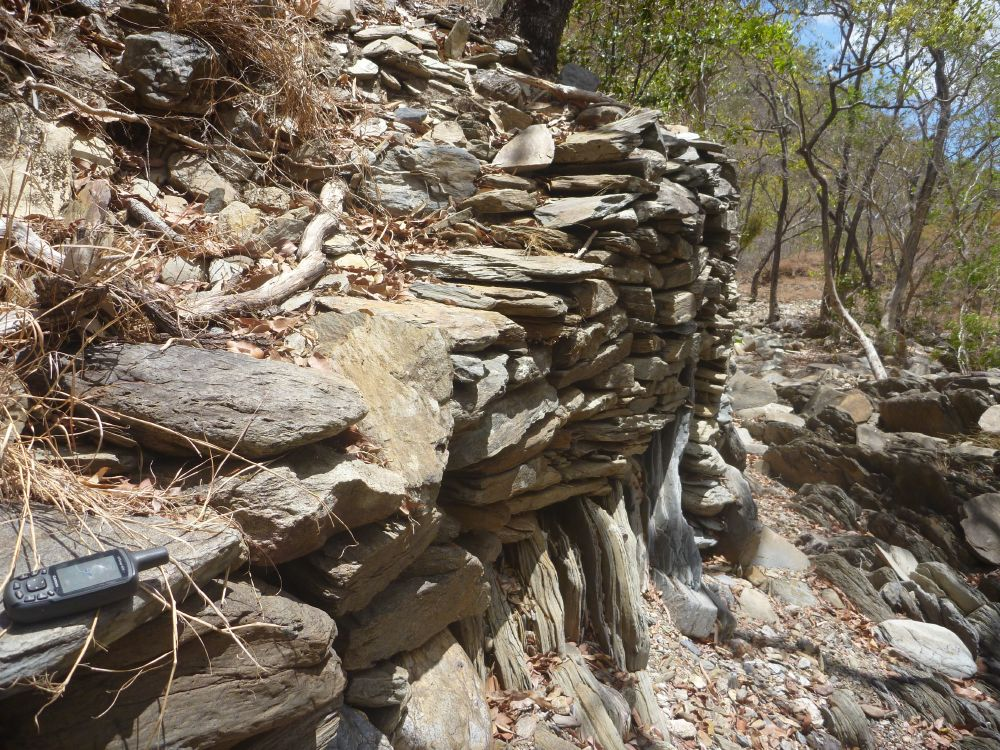
Stone pitching at Nuggety Gully, 2014 (mobile phone in lower left for scale)

Lakeland has a number of heritage-listed sites, including:

- Mareeba Mining District (15.9776°S 144.9328°E): Nuggety Gully Water Race and Chinese Camp

== Economy ==
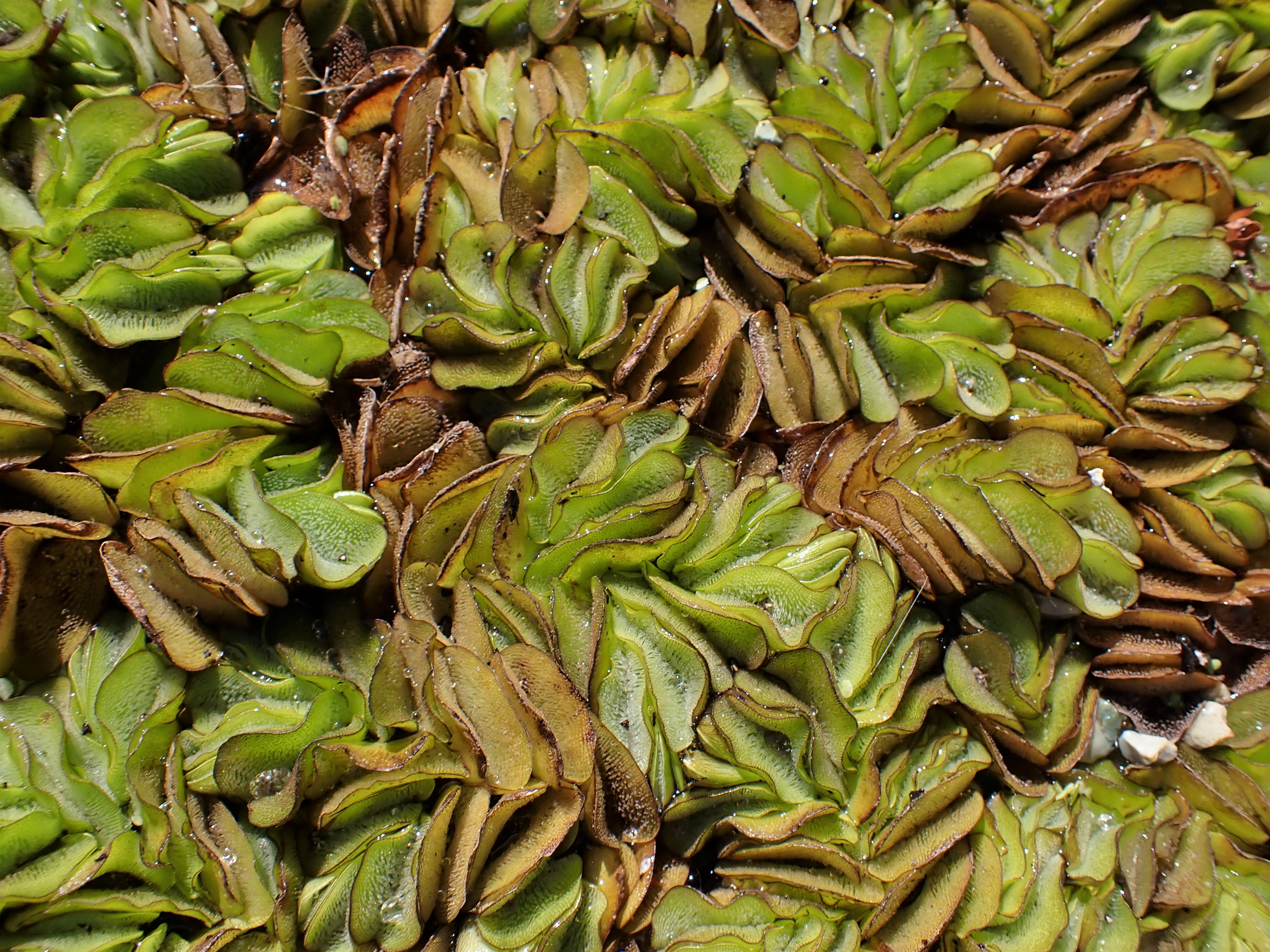
Salvinia molesta is a floating fern. It becomes a thick mat that can smother native aquatic plants, alter stream flow, and deplete oxygen levels for aquatic organisms. It is most likely to grow in freshwater creeks and in wetlands, and is usually spread by the movement of water plants, aquariums or watercraft. Biosecurity Queensland and Cook Shire Council are working on the complete eradication of salvinia as well as hymenachne (marsh grass), which is another aquatic weed. Report any suspected outbreaks to Cook Shire Council.

At Lakeland, most of the irrigation water comes from farm dams. Licenses are required to extract surface or bore water for irrigation purposes. In 2012, there were 16 licenses to impound water in the Normanby catchment, with most occurring in the Lakeland area. Many of the dams are located on small creeks. Honey Dam is the largest on Bullhead Creek, which flows into the Laura River. Dams are only permitted to store wet season run off.

The main products are cattle and cropping, including bananas.

In April 2022, a 10.8 MWac solar PV with a 1.4MWac/5.3MWh BESS solar farm was opened south of the township.

== Education ==
Lakeland State School is a government primary (Early Childhood-6) school for boys and girls on the corner of Peninsula Developmental Road and the Mulligan Highway (15.8569°S 144.8568°E). In 2018, the school had an enrolment of 17 students with 2 teachers and 4 non-teaching staff (2 full-time equivalent).

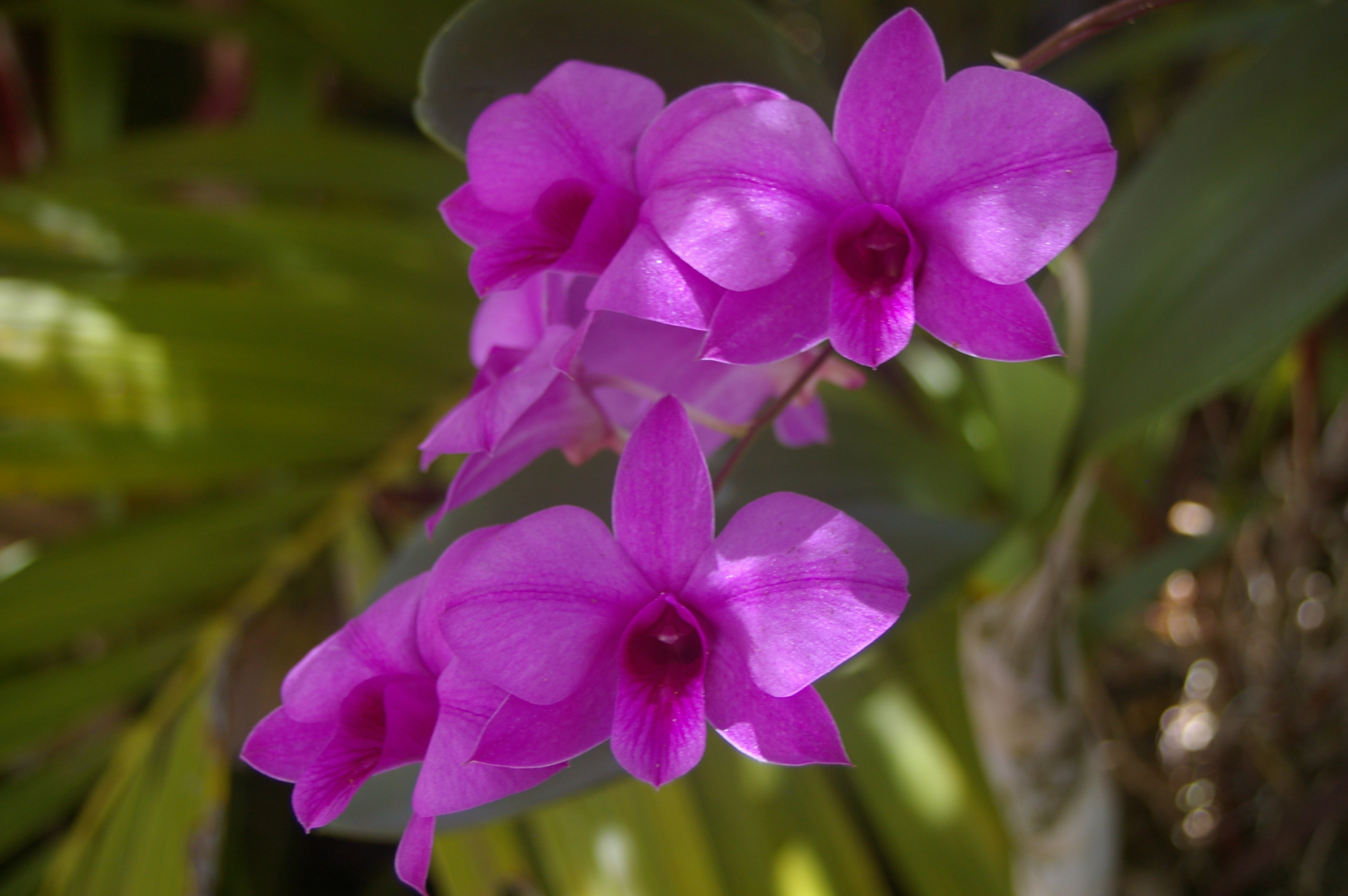
Cooktown orchid - Dendrobium bigibbum. Queensland 2008

There are no secondary schools in Lakeland. The nearest government secondary school is Cooktown State School in Cooktown to the north-east. Given the distances involved, distance education and boarding school are the alternatives.

== Environmental ==
The Lakeland Agricultural Area Water Quality Monitoring Program is a project to work with landowners to monitor water quality.

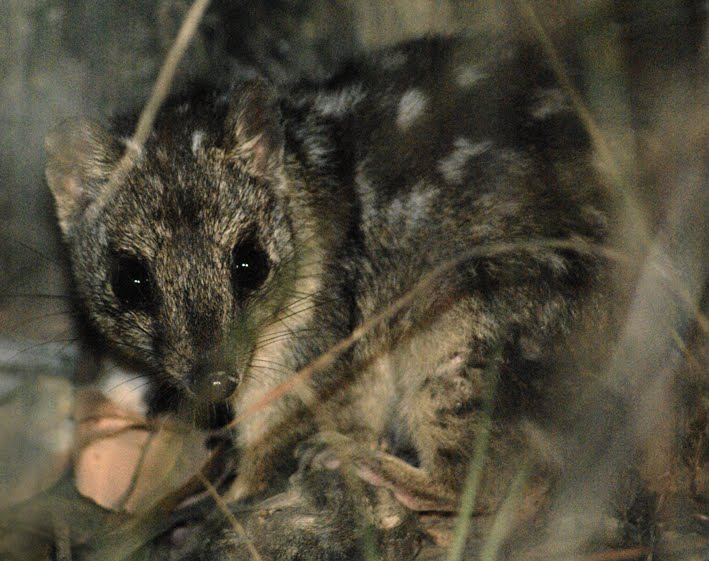
Northern quoll - Dasyurus hallucatus. Queensland, 2009

In 2016 the Queensland Government purchased Springvale Station, a 56,295-hectare (139,110-acre) property situated in the east of the locality. Springvale Station was purchased to add to the State's protected area network and complement activities being taken to reduce sediment run-off entering the Normanby River catchment that flows into Princess Charlotte Bay and the Great Barrier Reef. The Department of Environment and Science contracted Cape York Natural Resource Management (Cape York NRM) to work with traditional owners, Griffith University, the Department of Agriculture and Fisheries, and erosion, water quality and vegetation scientists to develop the Springvale Erosion Management Plan.

Springvale Station Nature Refuge provides important habitat for endangered or vulnerable flora and fauna including the Cooktown orchid, ghost bat, northern quoll, red goshawk, spectacled flying-fox, spotted-tailed quoll, Semon's leaf nosed bat and large eared-horseshoe bat. There is no public access on the Nature Refuge.

== Amenities ==
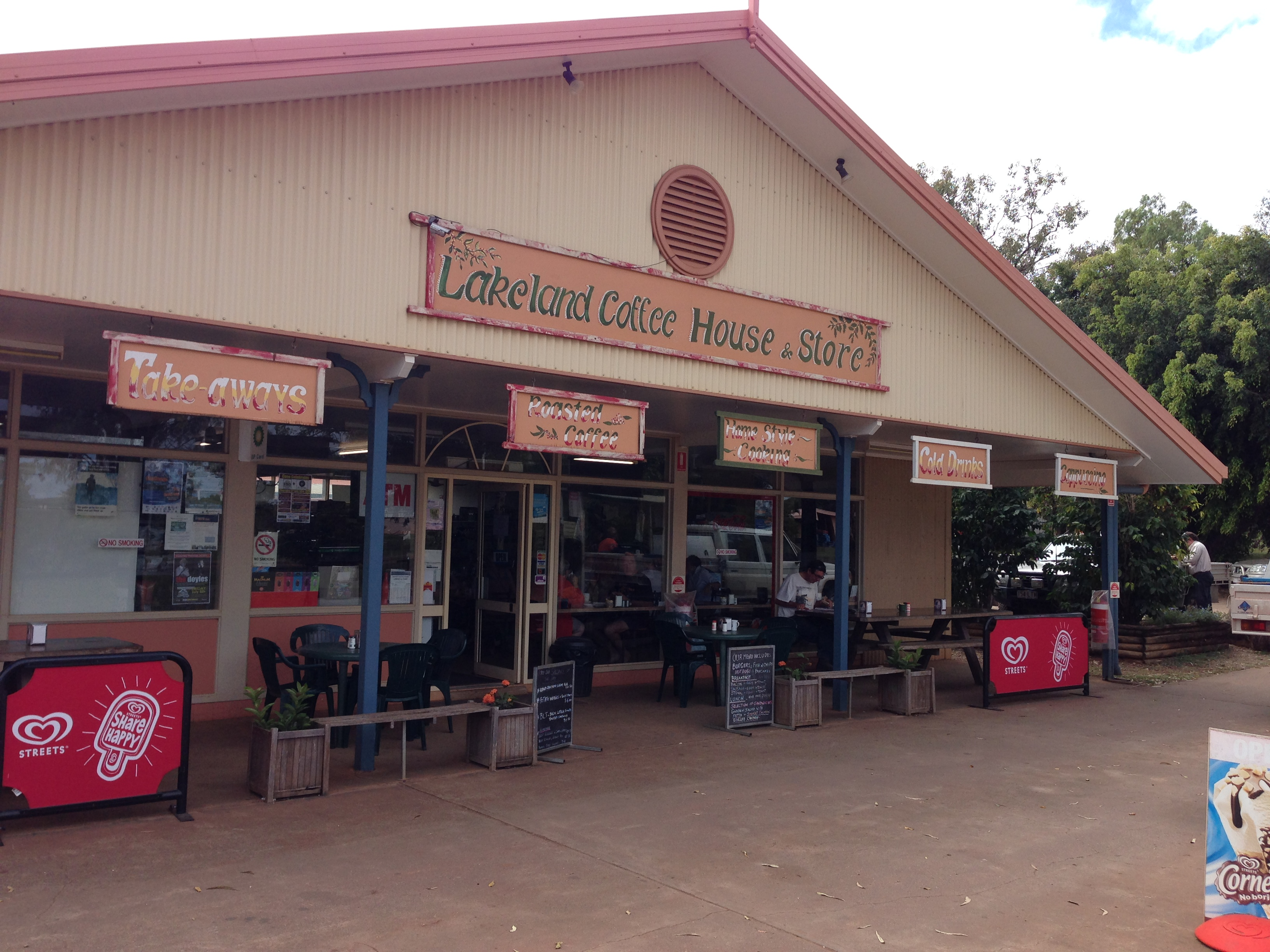
Lakeland Coffee House and Store, 2014

Lakeland has a hotel, a cafe, and roadhouse and a hardware store.

== Attractions ==
James Earl Lookout is off the Mulligan Highway, 14.7 kilometres (9.1 mi) SSE of the town (15.9751°S 144.8289°E).

See James Earl for more information regarding the lookout namesake.

== Transport ==
Lakeland Airport (YLND) is located north of the township, beside the Mulligan Highway.
