= Yacamunda Station =

Coordinates: 21°22′35″S 147°06′04″E

Yacamunda Station is a historic cattle station in North Queensland near Bowen. In 1935 it was one of the largest cattle stations in the state and played a significant part in the growth and development of early Australia. It was later sold in 2007 as a functioning cattle station. Historical references and photos are available for reference.

Yacamunda Station was also the name for a telegraph station on the Clermont—Charters Towers line as an important historical location featuring a public telephone.

== Location ==
The station is located on the Belyando River in the Bowen area. Yacamunda is 280 km west of Mackay. The original boundaries were described to the north as Rutherford and Natal Downs, on the west by Mt Hope and Mt Douglas, on the south by Stratford, Glen Avon, and Glen Eva, and on the east by Terang, Mt Lookout, Whynot, and Bungabine. It was part of St Ann's holding and originally much larger than it is today.

St Ann's was one of the oldest settled portions of the Queensland district and was shown on historic maps of Queensland. Later however, St Ann's was superseded in importance by Yacamunda as an outstation of Yacamunda.

Yacamunda was larger at the time it was under the Earl family's management, but four selections were cut away from the original holding named Scartwater, Mt Hope, Bungabine, and Whynot.

== Origin of the name ==
Yacamunda is an Aboriginal word meaning "work for your tucker". The name of the station could have its origins in this Aboriginal word as there were many Aboriginal people, especially stockmen, who were working at the station.

== History ==
The clan of Aboriginal people originally residing on the property were referred to as the Belyando tribe.

James Earl, William Earl and Thomas Earl, three young Englishmen, were described as “path finders” and “trail breakers”, whose “names will go down in the history of this State”. At the time when they arrived to the recently established settlement of Bowen in the 1860s, Bowen itself was described at that time as “a few tents and bark huts on the shore of Port Denison”. They moved westward in search of pastoral land. They eventually took up a vast land area. They stocked the country and formed it into a station, calling it “Glen Lee”. The station later became known as Yacamunda Station.

They took up Yacamunda Station which is located on the Belyando River in the Bowen area. They were described as "squatters".

They later took up Iffley Station in 1864 but floods carried off their entire stock. They subsequently returned to Yacamunda.

The station was commonly referred to as “Yacamunda”. In 1935 the station was referred to as St Ann's holding, including area of approximately 1200 square miles. It was originally held by Earl and was larger than in 1935. The Clermont—Charters Towers telephone line had a telegraph station at Yacamunda. A public telephone was installed there at Yacamunda, an important way of linking the station allowing communications with the rest of the local area.

Around 1935 the station held between 24,000 and 25,000 cattle and a few blood draught horses. The station traded large numbers of bullocks around Queensland to Lakes Creek, Gladstone, Alligator Creek meatworks and other places were the cattle and bullocks were on-sold.

There were up to sixteen permanent stockman camps on the property prior to World War II. The majority of the stockmen working in the different sections were Aboriginal Australians.

The property was acquired in 1914 by Winter lrvinrg and the Robinson brothers, who were well-known pastoralists in NSW and Victoria and would inspect the property yearly. Mr Kermode became the manager of the station but died after falling from a horse on the property. In 1920 Mr G.H. Creaghe became the manager on site; he made improvements to the site and was well known and respected in the district at the time.

The property was sold to the local Scott family in 2007, and included 38,500 hectares of grass pasture as well as 8000 cattle, a two-level, air-conditioned homestead, cottages, and a station plant.

== Climate and weather impact ==
Yacamunda is subject to the harsh Northern Queensland weather conditions. In the dry season of 1935 (Winter) it was reported that Yacamunda was impact by low rainfall. This impacted livestock numbers and some cattle perished near dried-up waterholes, which were called "death traps" and fenced off. To preserve cattle numbers, some were moved to other areas on the property or adjacent properties.

== See also ==
- Belyando, Queensland
- Shire of Belyando
