= Narrien Range National Park =

National park in Queensland, Australia

- IUCN category II (national park)
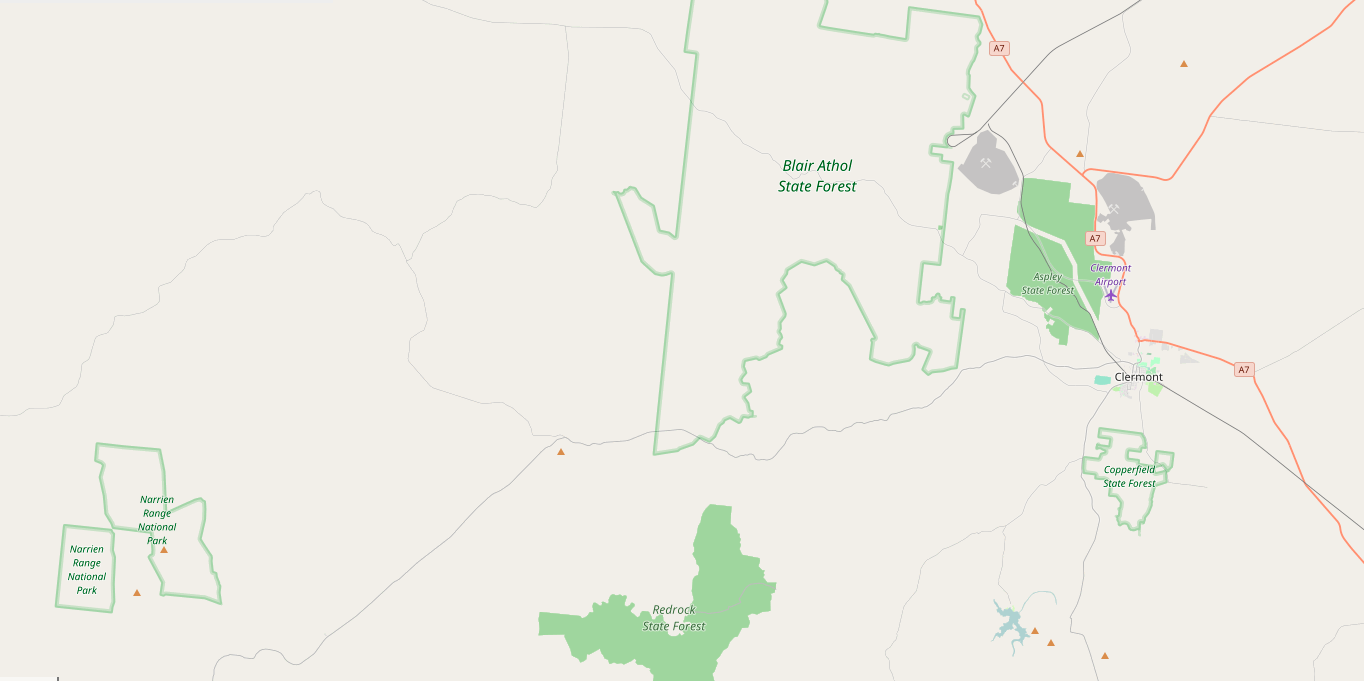

- Location within Queensland
- Location: Queensland
- Coordinates: 22°53′53″S 146°56′27″E
- Area: 40.20 km^{2} (15.52 sq mi)
- Governing body: Queensland Parks and Wildlife Service

Narrien Range is a national park in Queensland, Australia, 796 km northwest of Brisbane.

== See also ==
- Protected areas of Queensland
