= List of regencies and cities in Jambi =

This is a list of regencies and cities in Jambi province. As of October 2019, there were 9 regencies and 2 cities.

#	Regency/ City	Capital	Regent/ Mayor	Area (km^{2})	Population (2019)	District	Kelurahan (urban village)/ Desa (village)	Logo	Location map
1	Batang Hari Regency	Muara Bulian	Syahirsah	5.804,00	304.162	8	14/110		
2	Bungo Regency	Muara Bungo	Mashuri	4.659,00	337.834	17	12/141		
3	Kerinci Regency	Siulak	Adirozal	3.355,27	240.361	16	2/285		
4	Merangin Regency	Bangko	Al Haris	7.679,00	339.247	24	10/205		
5	Muaro Jambi Regency	Sengeti	Masnah Busro	5.326,00	363.832	11	5/150		
6	Sarolangun Regency	Sarolangun	Cek Endra	6.184,00	317.317	10	9/149		
7	Tanjung Jabung Barat Regency	Kuala Tungkal	Safrial	4.649,85	324.334	13	20/114		
8	Tanjung Jabung Timur Regency	Muara Sabak	Romi Hariyanto	5.445,00	226.390	11	20/73		
9	Tebo Regency	Muara Tebo	Sukandar	6.461,00	324.619	12	5/107		
10	Jambi	-	Syarif Fasha	103,54	614.329	11	62/-		
11	Sungai Penuh	-	Asafri Jaya Bakri	391,50	100.934	8	4/65		
