= 2021 Liga 3 Jambi =

Tournament details
- Dates: 17 October–1 November 2021
- Teams: 15

Final positions
- Champions: Jambi United (1st title)
- Runners-up: PS Muaro Jambi

The 2021 Liga 3 Jambi was the sixth season of Liga 3 Jambi as a qualifying round for the national round of the 2021–22 Liga 3.

Persibri Batanghari were the defending champion.

== Teams ==
There are 15 teams participated in the league this season.

Team	Location
Bungo Putra	Bungo
Jambi United	Jambi
Merangin	Merangin
Persibri Batanghari	Batanghari
Persikoja Jambi City	Jambi
Persikota Sungai Penuh	Sungai Penuh
Persisko Merangin	Merangin
Persitaj West Tanjung Jabung	West Tanjung Jabung
PS Kerinci	Kerinci
PS Muaro Jambi	Muaro Jambi
PS PLN Jambi	Jambi
PS Sailun Salimbai	Muaro Jambi
PS Tebo	Tebo
Siginjei Sakti	Jambi
Tabir	Merangin

== Venue ==
All matches was held in KONI Stadium, Batanghari.

== Group stage ==
=== Group A ===
Pos	Team	Pld	W	D	L	GF	GA	GD	Pts	Qualification
1	Persibri Batanghari (H)	3	2	1	0	14	1	+13	7	Advanced to Quarter final
2	Bungo Putra	3	1	1	1	3	3	0	4	Advanced to Quarter final
3	Persitaj West Tanjung Jabung	3	1	0	2	6	4	+2	3	
4	PS Sailun Salimbai	3	1	0	2	1	16	−15	3	

Updated to match(es) played on unknown. Source: Liga 3 Jambi 2021
(H) Hosts

=== Group B ===
Pos	Team	Pld	W	D	L	GF	GA	GD	Pts	Qualification
1	PS Muaro Jambi	3	3	0	0	7	2	+5	9	Advanced to Quarter final
2	Merangin	3	1	0	2	4	4	0	3	Advanced to Quarter final
3	PS Tebo	3	1	0	2	3	5	−2	3	
4	Persisko Merangin	3	1	0	2	3	6	−3	3	

Updated to match(es) played on unknown. Source: Liga 3 Jambi 2021

=== Group C ===
Pos	Team	Pld	W	D	L	GF	GA	GD	Pts	Qualification
1	Jambi United	3	3	0	0	12	4	+8	9	Advanced to Quarter final
2	Siginjai Sakti	3	2	0	1	7	4	+3	6	Advanced to Quarter final
3	Tabir	3	1	0	2	3	8	−5	3	
4	PS PLN Jambi	3	0	0	3	0	6	−6	0	

Updated to match(es) played on unknown. Source: Liga 3 Jambi 2021

=== Group D ===
Pos	Team	Pld	W	D	L	GF	GA	GD	Pts	Qualification
1	Persikota Sungai Penuh	2	2	0	0	5	0	+5	6	Advanced to Quarter final
2	PS Kerinci	2	0	1	1	0	1	−1	1	Advanced to Quarter final
3	Persikoja Jambi City	2	0	1	1	0	4	−4	1	

Updated to match(es) played on unknown. Source: Liga 3 Jambi 2021

== Knockout stage ==
=== Quarter final ===
October 27, 2021
15.30 UTC+7

Persibri Batanghari	1–2	Merangin
	Report

KONI Stadium, Batanghari

October 28, 2021
13.30 UTC+7

PS Muaro Jambi	0–0 (3–0)	Bungo Putra
	Report

KONI Stadium, Batanghari

(PS Muaro Jambi won 3–0 on penalty shoot-out.)

October 28, 2021
15.30 UTC+7

Jambi United	5–2	PS Kerinci
	Report

KONI Stadium, Batanghari

October 29, 2021
15.30 UTC+7

Persikota Sungai Penuh	2–2 (5–4)	Siginjai Sakti
	Report

KONI Stadium, Batanghari

(Persikota Sungai Penuh won 5–4 on penalty shoot-out.)

=== Semi final ===
October 30, 2021
13.30 UTC+7

Merangin	1–1 (1–4)	PS Muaro Jambi
	Report

KONI Stadium, Batanghari

(PS Muaro Jambi won 4–1 on penalty shoot-out.)

October 30, 2021
15.30 UTC+7

Jambi United	4–0	Persikota Sungai Penuh
	Report

KONI Stadium, Batanghari

=== Final ===
November 1, 2021
15.00 UTC+7

PS Muaro Jambi	0–0 (4–5)	Jambi United
	Report

KONI Stadium, Batanghari

(Jambi United won 5–4 on penalty shoot-out.)
