= 2015 Indonesian local elections =

- 9 December 2015

9 governors, 36 mayors, and 224 regents
Leadership before election
See below
Elected Leadership
See below

Local elections were held in Indonesia on 9 December 2015. Eligible voters went to the polls to determine 9 gubernatorial, 224 regent and 36 mayoral races across the country. This election marks the first time since Indonesia's transition to democracy that local elections are held simultaneously in one day. Under the current plan, simultaneous partial local elections will be held in February 2017, June 2018, December 2020, culminating in simultaneous elections for all local executive posts on 2024.

== Schedule ==
In the timetable organized by the General Elections Commission (KPU), independent candidates were to submit signatures for nominations between 8–12 June 2015 (for gubernatorial candidates) and between 11–15 June 2015 (for regent and mayoral candidates). The independents along with candidates with support from political parties in the respective local legislatures formally registered their candidacies between 26–28 July. The documents submitted were verified and the candidates undertook medical check-ups. The local electoral commissions (KPUD) announced the candidates that will contest the elections on 24 August.

Campaigning ran between 27 August and 5 December. No campaigning were allowed between 6–8 December (the eve of the election).

Polling stations opened in the morning on 9 December 2015 and closed in the afternoon.

Official results were announced between 21–23 December 2015.

== Gubernatorial races ==
Note: Incumbents denoted in italic is either term-limited or not running for re-election.

Province	Incumbent	Result	Details
West Sumatra	Irwan Prayitno (PKS)	Irwan Prayitno (PKS)	Irwan Prayitno - 58.62% Muslim Kasim (Golkar) - 41.38%
Jambi	Hasan Basri Agus (Demokrat)	Zumi Zola (PAN)	Hasan Basri Agus - 39.75% Zumi Zola - 60.25%
Riau Islands	Muhammad Sani (Non-partisan)	Muhammad Sani (Non-partisan)	Muhammad Sani - 53.20% Soerya Respationo (Non-partisan) - 46.80%
Bengkulu	Junaidi Hamsyah (Non-partisan)	Ridwan Mukti (Golkar)	Ridwan Mukti - 57.37% Sultan B. Najamudin - 42.63%
North Kalimantan	Irianto Lambrie (Non-partisan)	Irianto Lambrie (Non-partisan)	Irianto Lambrie - 53.03% Jusuf S. Kasim (Nasdem) - 46.97% details
Central Kalimantan	Agustin Teras Narang (PDI–P)	Sugianto Sabran (Non-partisan)	Sugianto Sabran - 51.51% Willy Midel Yoseph - 48.49%
South Kalimantan	Rudy Ariffin (PPP)	Sahbirin Noor (Non-partisan)	Zairullah Azhar - 18,58% Sahbirin Noor - 41,05; Muhidin - 40,37%
North Sulawesi	Sinyo Harry Sarundajang (Demokrat)	Olly Dondokambey (PDI-P)	Olly Dondokambey - 51.37% Benny Mamoto - 30.97% Maya Rumantir - 17.65%
Central Sulawesi	Longki Djanggola (Non-partisan)	Longki Djanggola (Non-partisan)	Longki Djanggola - 54.50% Rusdy Mastura - 45.50%

== Regent races ==
Note: Incumbents denoted in italic is either term-limited or not running for re-election.

Regency	Incumbent	Result	Details
North Sumatera
South Tapanuli	Syahrul M. Pasaribu (Golkar)	Syahrul M. Pasaribu (Golkar)	Muhammad Yusuf Siregar - 27.64% Syahrul M. Pasaribu - 66.09% Aldinz Rapolo Siregar - 6.27%
Nias	Sokhiatulo Laoli (Demokrat)	Sokhiatulo Laoli (Demokrat)	Faigi'asa Bawamenewi - 43.19% Happy Persatuan Ndraha - 1.02% Sokhiatulo Laoli - 55.79%
Karo	Terkelin Brahmana (Gerindra)	Terkelin Brahmana (Gerindra)	Heben Heser Ginting - 2.77% Sudarto Sitepu - 15.83% Ramon Bangun - 19.66% Layari Sinukaban - 17.34% Cuaca Bangun - 6.33% Terkelin Brahmana - 24.67% Bangkit Sitepu - 13.40%
Simalungun	Jopinus Ramli Saragih (Demokrat)	Jopinus Ramli Saragih (Demokrat)	Tumpak Siregar - 26.57% Evra Sassky Damanik - 19.39% Nuriaty Damanik - 17.22% Jopinus Ramli Saragin - 34.69% Lindung Gurning - 2.13%
Asahan	Taufan Gama Simatupang (PDI-P)	Taufan Gama Simatupang (PDI-P)	Nurhajizah Marpaung - 43.69% Taufan Gama Simatupang - 56.31%
Labuhan Batu	Tigor Panusunan Siregar - (Golkar)	Pangonal Harahap - (PDI-P)	Zainal Arifin Dalimunthe - 3.80% Mahini Rizal - 4.46% Pangonal Harahap - 32.33% Suhari - 29.33% Tigor Panusunan Siregar - 30.08%
Toba Samosir	Pandapotan Kasmin Simanjuntak (Demokrat)	Darwin Siagian (Hanura)	Darwin Siagian - 42.81% Poltak Sitorus - 33.81% Monang Sitorus - 23.38%
Mandailing Natal	Dahlan Hasan Nasution (PKB)	Dahlan Hasan Nasution (PKB)	M. Yusuf - 27.53% Dahlan Hasan Nasution - 56.52% Saparuddin Haji - 15.95%
South Nias	Idealisman Dachi (PDI-P)	Hilarius Duha (PKPI)	Lianus Ndruru - 20.02% Idealisman Dachi - 32.18% Hilarius Duha - 37.62% Hidarat Manao - 10.18%
Pakpak Bharat	Remigo Yolando Berutu - (Nasdem)	Remigo Yolando Berutu - (Nasdem)	Remigo Yolando Berutu - 57.36% Jujur Solin - 0.23% August P. Tumanggor - 42.41%
Humbang Hasundutan	Maddin Sihombing - (PPRN)	Dosmar Banjarnahor - (PDI-P)	Marganti Manullang - 28.80% Dosmar Banjarmahor - 31.50% Rimso Maruli Sinaga - 2.65% Palbet Siboro - 25.35% Harry Marbun - 11.70%
Samosir			
Serdang Bedagai			
South Labuhan Batu			
North Labuhan Batu			
North Nias			
West Nias			
West Sumatera
Pesisir Selatan			
Solok			
Sijunjung			
Tanah Datar			
Padang Pariaman			
Agam			
Lima Puluh Kota			
Pasaman			
Mentawai Islands			
Dharmasraya			
South Solok			
West Pasaman			
Riau
Indragiri Hulu			
Bengkalis			
Pelalawan			
Rokan Hulu			
Rokan Hilir			
Siak			
Kuantan Singingi			
Meranti Islands			
Jambi
Kerinci			
Merangin			
Sarolangun			
Batanghari			
Muaro Jambi			
West Tanjung Jabung			
East Tanjung Jabung			
Bungo			
Tebo			
South Sumatera
Musi Rawas			
North Musi Rawas Regency			
Penukal Abab Lematang Ilir			
Ogan Ilir			
Ogan Komering Ulu			
East Ogan Komering Ulu			
South Ogan Komering Ulu			
Bengkulu
South Bengkulu			
Rejang Lebong			
North Bengkulu			
Kaur			
Seluma			
Mukomuko			
Lebong			
Kepahiang			
Central Bengkulu			
Lampung
South Lampung			
Central Lampung			
East Lampung			
Way Kanan			
Pesawaran			
Pesisir Barat			
Bangka Belitung
South Bangka			
Central Bangka			
West Bangka			
East Belitung	Basuri Tjahaja Purnama (Non-partisan)		
Riau Islands
West Java
Bandung (regency)	Dadang M Naser (Non-partisan)	Dadang M Naser (Non-partisan)	Sofyan Yahya - 24,95% Dadang M Naser 64,27% Deki Fajar - 10,77%
Sukabumi (regency)			
Indramayu			
Cianjur			
Karawang			
Pangandaran			
Tasikmalaya (regency)	UU Ruzhanul Ulum (PKB)	UU Ruzhanul Ulum (PKB)	Yes - 67,35% No - 32,65%
Central Java
Yogyakarta
Bantul	Sri Surya Widati (PDI-P)	Suharsono (Gerindra)	Suharsono - 52,80% Sri Surya Widati - 47,20%
Gunungkidul			
Sleman	Sri Purnomo (PAN)	Sri Purnomo (PAN)	Sri Purnomo - 56,66% Yuni Satia Rahayu - 43,34%
East Java
Pacitan			
Ponorogo			
Trenggalek			
Blitar			
Kediri			
Malang			
Jember			
Banyuwangi			
Situbondo			
Sidoarjo	Saiful Ilah (PKB)	Saiful Ilah (PKB)	Hadi Sutjipto - 26,67% Utsman Ikhsan - 8,92% Saiful Ilah - 58,94% Warih Andono - 5,47%
Mojokerto			
Ngawi			
Tuban			
Lamongan			
Gresik			
Sumenep			
Banten
Pandeglang			
Serang			
Bali
Badung			
Bangli			
Jembrana			
Karangasem			
Tabanan			
West Nusa Tenggara
Bima			
Central Lombok			
Dompu			
North Lombok			
Sumbawa			
West Sumbawa			
East Nusa Tenggara
Belu			
East Sumba			
Malaka			
Manggarai			
Ngada			
North Central Timor			
Sabu Raijua			
West Manggarai			
West Sumba			
West Kalimantan
Central Kalimantan
South Kalimantan
East Kalimantan
North Kalimantan
North Sulawesi
Central Sulawesi
South Sulawesi
Selayar Islands	Syahrir Wahab (Golkar)	Basli Ali (Gerindra)	Saiful Arif - 30,19% Basli Ali - 42,99% Aji Sumarno - 26,82%
Bulukumba	Zainuddin Hasan (Golkar)	Sukri A Sappewali (Gerindra)	Sukri A Sappewali - 28,30% Abdul Kahar Muslim - 23,56% Jumrana Salikki - 7,53% Masykur A Sulthan - 14,79% Askar HL - 25,83%
Gowa	Ichsan Yasin Limpo (Golkar)	Adnan Purichta Ichsan YL Non-partisan}	Andi Maddusila Andi Idjo - 26,81% Sjachrir Sjafruddin Dg. Jarung - 3,90% Djamaluddin Maknun - 1,58% Tenri Olle Yasin Limpo - 26,06% Adnan Purichta Ichsan YL - 41,65%
Maros	Hatta Rahman (PAN)	Hatta Rahman (PAN)	Muh Imran Yusuf - 2,67% A Husain Rasul - 29,61% Hatta Rahman - 67,71%
Pangkajene Islands	Syamsuddin A Hamid	Syamsuddin A Hamid	Abd Rahmas Assagaf - 41,77%% H Sangkala H Taepe - 11,55% Nur Achmad AS - 1,08% Syamsuddin A Hamid - 45,60%
Barru	Andi Idris Syukur (PKS)	Andi Idris Syukur (PKS)	Andi Anwar Aksa - 24,29% M Malkan Amin - 37,45% Andi Idris Syukur - 38,26%
Soppeng	Andi Soetomo (Gerindra)	A Kaswadi Razak (Gerindra)	Lutfi Halide - 42,25% A Kaswadi Razak - 57,75%
Tana Toraja	Theofilus Allorerung (Golkar) (but running as independent)	Nicodemus Biringkanae (Demokrat)	Zadrak Tombeg - 25,04% Nicodemus Biringkanae - 41,99% Theofilus Allorerung - 32,97%
North Luwu	Arifin Junaidi (Golkar)	Indah Putri Indriani (Gerindra)	Indah Putri Indriani - 53,60% Arifin Junaidi - 46,40%
East Luwu	Andi Hatta Marakarma (Golkar)	Thoriq Husler (Gerindra)	M Nur Husain - 33,49% H Badaruddin - 4,77% Thoriq Husler - 61,74%
North Toraja	Frederik Batti Sorring (Nasdem)	Kalatiku Paembonan (Gerindra)	Kalatiku Paembonan - 54,20% Frederik Batti Sorring - 45,80%
Southeast Sulawesi
Gorontalo
West Sulawesi
Maluku
North Maluku
Papua
West Papua

== Mayoral races ==
Note: Incumbents denoted in italic is either term-limited or not running for re-election.

City	Incumbent	Result	Details
Balikpapan	Rizal Effendi (PDI-P)	Rizal Effendi (PDI-P)	Rizal Effendi - 44,80% Andi Burhanuddin Solong - 20,01% Heru Bambang - 35,19%
Bandar Lampung	Herman HN (Demokrat)	Herman HN (Demokrat)	Muhammad Yunus - 2,01% Herman HN - 86,66% Tobroni Harun - 11,32%
Banjarbaru	Ruzaidin Noor (Non-partisan)	Nadjmi Adhani (Non-partisan)	Joko Triono - 23,73% Ruzaidin Noor - 29,53% Nadjmi Adhani - 46,74%
Banjarmasin	Muhidin (Non-partisan)	Ibnu Sina (PKS)	Rojiansyah - 10,94% Zulfadli Gazali - 33,51% - Ibnu Sina 55,56%
Batam	Ahmad Dahlan (Non-partisan)	Muhammad Rudi (Demokrat)	
Binjai	HM Idaham (Demokrat)	HM Idaham (Demokrat)	HM Idaham - 38,25% Juliadi - 37,69% Haji Saleh Bangun - 24,06%
Bitung	Hanny Sondakh (PKPI)	Maximiliaan Jonas Lomban (Nasdem)	Maximiliaan Jonas Lomban - 35,88% Stefanus Bonifasius Pasuma - 4,33% Michael Remizaldy Jacobus - 7,09% Hengky Honandar - 27,11% Linna Utiarachman - 2,18% Aryanthi Baramuli Putri - 23,41%
Blitar	Samanhudi Anwar (PDI-P)	Samanhudi Anwar (PDI-P)	Mochsin - 7,96% Samanhudi Anwar - 92,04%
Bontang	Adi Darma (Golkar)	Neni Moerniaeni (Non-partisan)	Adi Darma - 44,15% Neni Moerniaeni - 55,85
Bukittinggi	Ismet Amzis (Demokrat)	Ramlan Nurmatias (Non-partisan)	Taslim - 16,59; Febby - 3,54% Harma Zaldi - 10,52% Ramlan Nurmatias - 41,80% Ismet Amzis - 27,55%
Cilegon	TB Iman Ariyadi (Golkar)	TB Iman Ariyadi (Golkar)	H Sudarmana - 22,63% TB Iman Ariyadi - 77,37% Ismet Amzis - 27,55%
Denpasar	I.B. Rai Dharmawijaya Mantra (PDI-P)	I.B. Rai Dharmawijaya Mantra (PDI-P)	I.B. Rai Dharmawijaya Mantra - 82,20% I Ketut Resmiyasa - 5,46% I Made Arjaya - 12,34%
Depok	Nur Mahmudi Ismail (PKS)	KH. Dr. Mohammad Idris (PKS)	Dimas Oky Nugroho - 38,13% KH. Dr. Mohammad Idris - 61,87%
Dumai	Khairul Anwar (PDI-P)		
Gunungsitoli	Martinus Lase (Demokrat)	Lakhomizaro Zebua (PDI-P)	
Magelang	Sigit Widyonindito (PDI-P)		
Manado	GS Vicky Lumentut (Demokrat)		
Mataram	Ahyar Abduh ()		
Medan	Dzulmi Eldin (Non-partisan)		
Metro	Lukman Hakim ()		
Palu	Rusdi Mastura (Golkar)		
Pasuruan	Hasani (PKB)		
Pekalongan	M Basyir Ahmad Syawie ()		
Pematangsiantar	Hulman Sitorus (Demokrat)		
Samarinda	Syaharie Ja'ang (Demokrat)		
Semarang	Hendrar Prihadi (PDI-P)		
Sibolga	Syarfi Hutauruk (Nasdem)		
Solok	Irzal Ilyas (Demokrat)		
Sungai Penuh	Asafri Jaya Bakri (Demokrat)		
Surabaya	Tri Rismaharini (PDI-P)	Tri Rismaharini (PDI-P)	details
Surakarta	FX Hadi Rudiyatmo (PDI-P)		
South Tangerang	Airin Rachmi Diany (PKB)		
Tanjungbalai	Thamrin Munthe ()		
Ternate	Burhan Abdurahman ()		
Tidore	Achmad Mahifa ()		
Tomohon	Jimmy Feidie Eman (Non-partisan)		
