= 2023 Liga 3 Jambi =

Tournament details
- Country: Indonesia
- Venue: 1
- Dates: 11 – 24 December 2023
- Teams: 9

Final positions
- Champions: Persebri (2nd title)
- Runners-up: Persikoja
- Qualified for: 2023–24 Liga 3 National phase

Tournament statistics
- Matches played: 19
- Goals scored: 58 (3.05 per match)

2023 Liga 3 Jambi is the sixth edition of Liga 3 Jambi organized by Asprov PSSI Jambi.

This competition was attended by 9 clubs. The winner of this competition will advance to the national phase.

Jambi United is the defending champion after winning it in the 2021 season.

== Teams ==
2023 Liga 3 Jambi was attended by 9 teams.

| No. | Team | Location |
|---|---|---|
| 1 | Persebri | Batanghari Regency |
| 2 | Patriot Bungo | Bungo Regency |
| 3 | PS Bungo | Bungo Regency |
| 4 | Jambi United | Jambi City |
| 5 | Persijam | Jambi City |
| 6 | Persikoja | Jambi City |
| 7 | Tabir | Merangin Regency |
| 8 | Persikasa | Sarolangun Regency |
| 9 | Perselu | West Tanjung Jabung Regency |

== Venue ==
- KONI Batanghari Stadium, Batanghari Regency

== Group stage ==
=== Group A ===
| Pos | Team | Pld | W | D | L | GF | GA | GD | Pts | Qualification |
|---|---|---|---|---|---|---|---|---|---|---|
| 1 | Persebri (H) | 4 | 4 | 0 | 0 | 17 | 2 | +15 | 12 | Advance to the knockout stage |
| 2 | Persikasa | 4 | 2 | 1 | 1 | 8 | 4 | +4 | 7 | Advance to the knockout stage |
| 3 | Persijam | 4 | 2 | 1 | 1 | 4 | 2 | +2 | 7 | |
| 4 | Tabir | 4 | 1 | 0 | 3 | 1 | 5 | −4 | 3 | |
| 5 | Perselu | 4 | 0 | 0 | 4 | 1 | 18 | −17 | 0 | |

Source: Asprov PSSI Jambi
(H) Hosts
11 December 2023
14.00 WIB

| Persikasa | 1–3 | Persebri |
|---|---|---|
| | Report |

KONI Batanghari Stadium, Batanghari Regency
11 December 2023
16.00 WIB

| Tabir | 1–0 | Perselu |
|---|---|---|
| | Report |

KONI Batanghari Stadium, Batanghari Regency

12 December 2023
14.00 WIB

| Persebri | 2–0 | Tabir |
|---|---|---|
| | Report |

KONI Batanghari Stadium, Batanghari Regency
12 December 2023
16.00 WIB

| Persijam | 0–0 | Persikasa |
|---|---|---|
| | Report |

KONI Batanghari Stadium, Batanghari Regency

14 December 2023
14.00 WIB

| Perselu | 0–1 | Persijam |
|---|---|---|
| | Report |

KONI Batanghari Stadium, Batanghari Regency
14 December 2023
16.00 WIB

| Persikasa | 1–0 | Tabir |
|---|---|---|
| | Report |

KONI Batanghari Stadium, Batanghari Regency

16 December 2023
14.00 WIB

| Persijam | 2–0 | Tabir |
|---|---|---|
| | Report |

KONI Batanghari Stadium, Batanghari Regency
16 December 2023
16.00 WIB

| Persebri | 10–0 | Perselu |
|---|---|---|
| | Report |

KONI Batanghari Stadium, Batanghari Regency

18 December 2023
14.00 WIB

| Persikasa | 6–1 | Perselu |
|---|---|---|
| | Report |

KONI Batanghari Stadium, Batanghari Regency
18 December 2023
16.00 WIB

| Persebri | 2–1 | Persijam |
|---|---|---|
| | Report |

KONI Batanghari Stadium, Batanghari Regency

=== Group B ===
| Pos | Team | Pld | W | D | L | GF | GA | GD | Pts | Qualification |
|---|---|---|---|---|---|---|---|---|---|---|
| 1 | Persikoja | 3 | 2 | 1 | 0 | 4 | 2 | +2 | 7 | Advance to the knockout stage |
| 2 | Patriot Bungo | 3 | 1 | 1 | 1 | 5 | 5 | 0 | 4 | Advance to the knockout stage |
| 3 | Jambi United | 3 | 0 | 3 | 0 | 5 | 5 | 0 | 3 | |
| 4 | PS Bungo | 3 | 0 | 1 | 2 | 3 | 5 | −2 | 1 | |

Source: Asprov PSSI Jambi
13 December 2023
14.00 WIB

| Patriot Bungo | 3–3 | Jambi United |
|---|---|---|
| | Report |

KONI Batanghari Stadium, Batanghari Regency
13 December 2023
16.00 WIB

| Persikoja | 2−1 | PS Bungo |
|---|---|---|
| | Report |

KONI Batanghari Stadium, Batanghari Regency

15 December 2023
14.00 WIB

| Patriot Bungo | 0−1 | Persikoja |
|---|---|---|
| | Report |

KONI Batanghari Stadium, Batanghari Regency
15 December 2023
16.00 WIB

| Jambi United | 1−1 | PS Bungo |
|---|---|---|
| | Report |

KONI Batanghari Stadium, Batanghari Regency

17 December 2023 (Note: The Jambi United vs Persikoja match was originally scheduled for 17 December 2023 at 14.00 WIB. The first half ended with a score of 1−1 and the match was stopped due to bad weather. The match is scheduled to resume on 18 December 2023 at 08.00 WIB.)
14.00 WIB

| Jambi United | 1−1 | Persikoja |
|---|---|---|
| | Report |

KONI Batanghari Stadium, Batanghari Regency
18 December 2023 (Note: The PS Bungo vs Patriot Bungo match was originally scheduled for 17 December 2023 at 16.00 WIB, was rescheduled due to bad weather reasons to 18 December 2023 at 09.00 WIB.)
09.00 WIB

| PS Bungo | 1−2 | Patriot Bungo |
|---|---|---|
| | Report |

KONI Batanghari Stadium, Batanghari Regency

== Knockout stage ==
=== Bracket ===
Semi-finals
20 December 2023 – Batanghari
A1 | Persebri | 2
B2 | Patriot Bungo | 1
22 December 2023 – Batanghari
B1 | Persikoja | 4
A2 | Persikasa | 0

Final
23 December 2023 – Batanghari
Persebri | 2
Persikoja | 1

=== Semi-finals ===
20 December 2023
15.00 WIB

| Persebri | 2−1 | Patriot Bungo |
|---|---|---|
| | Report |

KONI Batanghari Stadium, Batanghari Regency

22 December 2023
09.00 WIB (Note: The Persikoja vs Persikasa match was originally scheduled for 21 December 2023 at 15.00 WIB, was rescheduled due to bad weather reasons to 22 December 2023 at 09.00 WIB.)

| Persikoja | 4–0 | Persikasa |
|---|---|---|
| | Report |

KONI Batanghari Stadium, Batanghari Regency

=== Final ===
24 December 2023
15.00 WIB

| Persebri | 2–1 | Persikoja |
|---|---|---|
| | Report |

KONI Batanghari Stadium, Batanghari Regency

== Qualification to the national phase ==
| Team | Method of qualification | Date of qualification | Qualified to |
|---|---|---|---|
| Persebri | 2023 Liga 3 Jambi champions | 24 December 2023 | 2023-24 Liga 3 National Phase |

== See also ==
- 2023–24 Liga 3 National Phase
- 2023–24 Liga 2
