= List of incumbent regional heads and deputy regional heads in Jambi =

The following is an article about the list of Regional Heads and Deputy Regional Heads in 11 regencies/cities in Jambi who are currently still serving.

== List ==
Regency/ City	Photo of the Regent/ Mayor	Regent/ Mayor	Photo of Deputy Regent/ Mayor	Deputy Regent/ Mayor	Taking Office	End of Office (Planned)	Ref.
Batang Hari; Regency List of Regents/Deputy Regents		Muhammad Fadhil Arief		Bakhtiar	20 February 2025	20 February 2030	
Bungo; Regency List of Regents/Deputy Regents		Dedy Putra		Tri Wahyu Hidayat	26 May 2025	26 May 2030	
Kerinci; Regency List of Regents/Deputy Regents		Monadi		Murison	20 February 2025	20 February 2030	
Merangin; Regency List of Regents/Deputy Regents		M. Syukur		Abdul Khafidh	20 February 2025	20 February 2030	
Muaro Jambi; Regency List of Regents/Deputy Regents		Bambang Bayu Suseno		Junaidi Mahir	20 February 2025	20 February 2030	
Sarolangun; Regency List of Regents/Deputy Regents		Hurmin		Gerry Trisatwika	20 February 2025	20 February 2030	
West Tanjung Jabung; Regency List of Regents/Deputy Regents		Anwar Sadat		Katamso Syafei Ahmad	20 February 2025	20 February 2030	
East Tanjung Jabung; Regency List of Regents/Deputy Regents		Dillah Hikmah Sari		Muslimin Tanja	20 February 2025	20 February 2030	
Tebo; Regency List of Regents/Deputy Regents		Agus Rubiyanto		Nazar Efendi	20 February 2025	20 February 2030	
Jambi; City List of Mayors/Deputy mayors		Maulana		Diza Hazra Aljosha	20 February 2025	20 February 2030	
Sungai Penuh; City List of Mayors/Deputy mayors		Alfin		Azhar Hamzah	20 February 2025	20 February 2030	

Notes

- "Commencement of office" is the inauguration date at the beginning or during the current term of office. For acting regents/mayors, it is the date of appointment or extension as acting regent/mayor.
- Based on the Constitutional Court decision Number 27/PUU-XXII/2024, the Governor and Deputy Governor, Regent and Deputy Regent, and Mayor and Deputy Mayor elected in 2020 shall serve until the inauguration of the Governor and Deputy Governor, Regent and Deputy Regent, and Mayor and Deputy Mayor elected in the 2024 national simultaneous elections as long as the term of office does not exceed 5 (five) years.

== See also ==
- Jambi
