= 2020 Jambi gubernatorial election =

← 2015	9 December 2020	2024 →
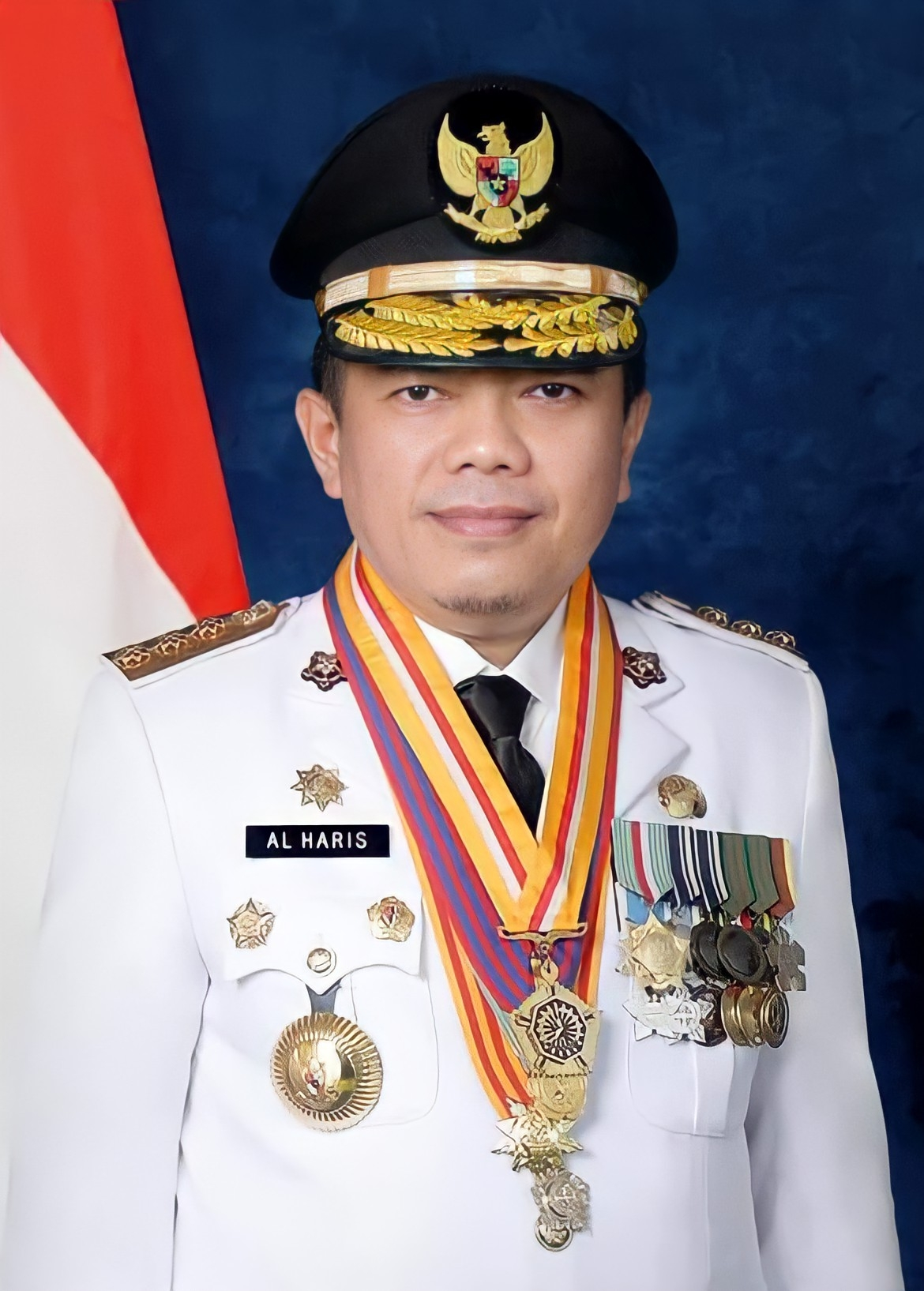

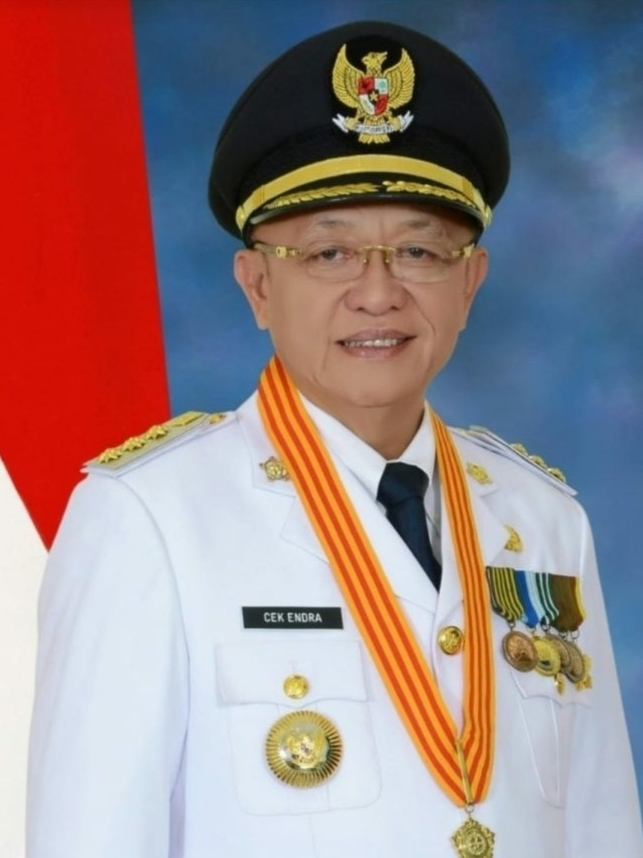

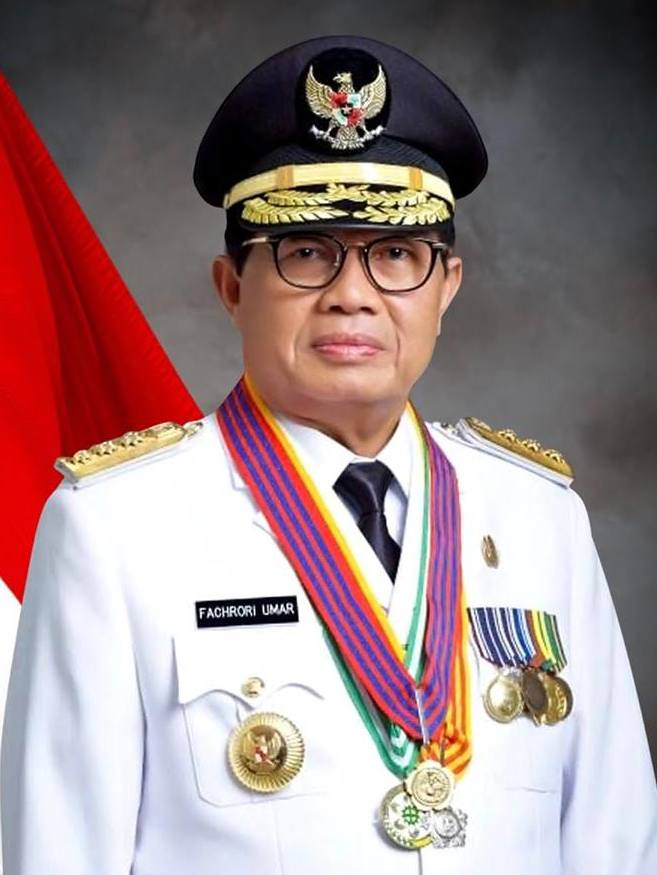
Candidate	Al Haris	Cek Endra	Fachrori Umar
Party	PAN	Golkar	Gerindra
Running mate	Abdullah Sani	Ratu Munawaroh	Syafril Nursal
popular vote	600,733	587,918	381,634
Percentage	38.26%	37.44%	24.30%
Supported by	PKB, PKS	PDI-P	Demokrat, PPP, Hanura
- Results by district
Governor before election
Fachrori Umar
Gerindra
Elected Governor
Al Haris
PAN

The 2020 Jambi gubernatorial election was held on 9 December 2020 to elect the governor and vice-governor of Jambi. They were held as a part of the 2020 local elections across Indonesia. The incumbent, Fachrori Umar, had taken office following the removal of Governor Zumi Zola over corruption and was running for re-election.

The regent of Merangin Regency, Al Haris, of the National Mandate Party won the most votes. However, the regent of Sarolangun Regency, Cek Endra, challenged the results to the Constitutional Court, resulting in a re-vote in 88 polling stations. Following the re-vote, the General Elections Commission declared Al Haris as the winner.

== Results ==
Candidate	Running mate	Party	Votes	%
Al Haris	Abdullah Sani	PAN	600,733	38.26
Cek Endra	Ratu Munawaroh	Golkar	587,918	37.44
Fachrori Umar	Syafril Nursal	Gerindra	381,634	24.30
Total			1,570,285	100.00
Valid votes			1,570,285	94.68
Invalid/blank votes			88,240	5.32
Total votes			1,658,525	100.00
Registered voters/turnout			2,442,306	67.91
Source: General Elections Commission
