= 2024–25 Liga 4 Jambi =

Liga 4 Jambi
- Season: 2024–25
- Dates: 9–19 February 2025
- Champions: Persebri Batanghari (1st title)
- National phase: Persebri Batanghari
- Matches: 15
- Goals: 47 (3.13 per match)
- Biggest win: PS Sailun Salimbai 1–6 Patriot Bungo (13 February 2025)
- Highest scoring: PS Sailun Salimbai 1–6 Patriot Bungo (13 February 2025)

The 2024–25 Liga 4 Jambi was the inaugural season of Liga 4 Jambi after the change in the structure of Indonesian football competition and serves as a qualifying round for the national phase of the 2024–25 Liga 4. The competition is organised by the Jambi Provincial PSSI Association.

== Teams ==
=== Participating teams ===
A total of 8 teams are competing in this season.

| No | Team | Location | 2023 season |
|---|---|---|---|
| 1 | Persikota Sungai Penuh | Sungai Penuh City | — |
| 2 | Patriot Bungo | Bungo Regency | Semi-finalist |
| 3 | Merangin | Merangin Regency | — |
| 4 | Persisko | Merangin Regency | — |
| 5 | Persebri Batanghari | Batanghari Regency | Champions |
| 6 | Persitaj | West Tanjung Jabung Regency | — |
| 7 | PS Sailun Salimbai | Muaro Jambi Regency | — |
| 8 | PS PLN Jambi | Jambi City | — |

== Schedule ==
The schedule of the competition is as follows.

| Stage | Matchday | Date |
|---|---|---|
| Group stage | Matchday 1 | 9–10 February 2025 |
| Group stage | Matchday 2 | 11–12 February 2025 |
| Group stage | Matchday 3 | 13–14 February 2025 |
| Knockout stage | Semi-finals | 16–17 February 2025 |
| Knockout stage | Final | 19 February 2025 |

== Group stage ==
A total of 8 teams will be drawn into two groups of four. The group stage will be played in a home tournament format of single round-robin matches.

The top two teams of each group will qualify for the knockout stage.

=== Group A ===
All matches will be held at KONI Batanghari Stadium, Batanghari.

| Pos | Team | Pld | W | D | L | GF | GA | GD | Pts | Qualification | PBI | PAT | SAI | KOT |
|---|---|---|---|---|---|---|---|---|---|---|---|---|---|---|
| 1 | Persebri Batanghari (H) | 3 | 3 | 0 | 0 | 8 | 2 | +6 | 9 | Qualification to the Knockout stage | — | — | — | 3–0 (Note: The match was awarded as a 3–0 victory to Persebri Batanghari, after Persikota Sungai Penuh did not send their team for the match.) |
| 2 | Patriot Bungo | 3 | 2 | 0 | 1 | 10 | 4 | +6 | 6 | Qualification to the Knockout stage | 1–3 | — | — | — |
| 3 | PS Sailun Salimbai | 3 | 1 | 0 | 2 | 5 | 8 | −3 | 3 | | 1–2 | 1–9 | — | — |
| 4 | Persikota Sungai Penuh (Note: Persikota Sungai Penuh was deducted nine points by the Jambi PSSI disciplinary committee.) | 3 | 0 | 0 | 3 | 0 | 9 | −9 | −9 | | — | 0–3 (Note: The match was awarded as a 3–0 victory to Patriot Bungo, after Persikota Sungai Penuh did not send their team for the match.) | 0–3 (Note: The match was awarded as a 3–0 victory to PS Sailun Salimbai, after Persikota Sungai Penuh did not send their team for the match.) | — |

Source: Liga 4 Jambi
Rules for classification: 1) Points; 2) Head-to-head points; 3) Head-to-head goal difference; 4) Head-to-head goals scored; 5) Goal difference; 6) Goals scored; 7) Fair-play points; 8) Draw.
(H) Hosts

==== Group A Matches ====
Matchday 1 (9 February 2025)
9 February 2025
14:00 WIB (UTC+7)

| Persikota Sungai Penuh | 0–3 Awarded (Note: The match was awarded as a 3–0 victory to PS Sailun Salimbai, after Persikota Sungai Penuh did not send their team for the match.) | PS Sailun Salimbai |
|---|---|---|
| | Report |

KONI Batanghari Stadium, Batanghari
9 February 2025
16:00 WIB (UTC+7)

| Patriot Bungo | 1–3 | Persebri Batanghari |
|---|---|---|
| | Report |

KONI Batanghari Stadium, Batanghari

Matchday 2 (11 February 2025)
11 February 2025
14:00 WIB (UTC+7)

| Persikota Sungai Penuh | 0–3 Awarded (Note: The match was awarded as a 3–0 victory to Patriot Bungo, after Persikota Sungai Penuh did not send their team for the match.) | Patriot Bungo |
|---|---|---|
| | Report |

KONI Batanghari Stadium, Batanghari
11 February 2025
16:00 WIB (UTC+7)

| PS Sailun Salimbai | 1–2 | Persebri Batanghari |
|---|---|---|
| | Report |

KONI Batanghari Stadium, Batanghari

Matchday 3 (13 February 2025)
13 February 2025
14:00 WIB (UTC+7)

| PS Sailun Salimbai | 1–6 | Patriot Bungo |

KONI Batanghari Stadium, Batanghari
13 February 2025
16:00 WIB (UTC+7)

| Persebri Batanghari | 3–0 Awarded (Note: The match was awarded as a 3–0 victory to Persebri Batanghari, after Persikota Sungai Penuh did not send their team for the match.) | Persikota Sungai Penuh |

KONI Batanghari Stadium, Batanghari

=== Group B ===
All matches will be held at KONI Batanghari Stadium, Batanghari Regency.

| Pos | Team | Pld | W | D | L | GF | GA | GD | Pts | Qualification | TAJ | PLN | MFC | PKO |
|---|---|---|---|---|---|---|---|---|---|---|---|---|---|---|
| 1 | Persitaj | 3 | 2 | 1 | 0 | 9 | 4 | +5 | 7 | Qualification to the Knockout stage | — | — | 2–2 | 4–0 |
| 2 | PS PLN Jambi | 3 | 2 | 0 | 1 | 6 | 3 | +3 | 6 | Qualification to the Knockout stage | 2–3 | — | 1–0 | — |
| 3 | Merangin | 3 | 1 | 1 | 1 | 3 | 3 | 0 | 4 | | — | — | — | 1–0 |
| 4 | Persisko | 3 | 0 | 0 | 3 | 0 | 8 | −8 | 0 | | — | 0–3 | — | — |

Source: Liga 4 Jambi
Rules for classification: 1) Points; 2) Head-to-head points; 3) Head-to-head goal difference; 4) Head-to-head goals scored; 5) Goal difference; 6) Goals scored; 7) Fair-play points; 8) Draw.

==== Group B Matches ====
Matchday 1 (10 February 2025)
10 February 2025
14:00 WIB (UTC+7)

| PS PLN Jambi | 2–3 | Persitaj |
|---|---|---|
| | Report |

KONI Batanghari Stadium, Batanghari
10 February 2025
16:00 WIB (UTC+7)

| Merangin | 1–0 | Persisko |
|---|---|---|
| | Report |

KONI Batanghari Stadium, Batanghari

Matchday 2 (12 February 2025)
12 February 2025
14:00 WIB (UTC+7)

| PS PLN Jambi | 1–0 | Merangin |
|---|---|---|
| | Report |

KONI Batanghari Stadium, Batanghari
12 February 2025
16:00 WIB (UTC+7)

| Persitaj | 4–0 | Persisko |
|---|---|---|
| | Report |

KONI Batanghari Stadium, Batanghari

Matchday 3 (14 February 2025)
14 February 2025
14:00 WIB (UTC+7)

| Persisko | 0–3 | PS PLN Jambi |
|---|---|---|
| | Report |

KONI Batanghari Stadium, Batanghari
14 February 2025
16:00 WIB (UTC+7)

| Persitaj | 2–2 | Merangin |
|---|---|---|
| | Report |

KONI Batanghari Stadium, Batanghari

== Knockout stage ==
The knockout stage will be played as a single match. If tied after regulation time, extra time and, if necessary, a penalty shoot-out will be used to decide the winning team.

=== Bracket ===
Semi-finals
16 February 2025 – Batanghari
A1 | Persebri Batanghari | 2
B2 | PS PLN Jambi | 0
17 February 2025 – Batanghari
B1 | Persitaj | 0
A2 | Patriot Bungo | 2

Final
19 February 2025 – Batanghari
Persebri Batanghari | 2
Patriot Bungo | 0

=== Semi-finals ===
16 February 2025
15:00 WIB (UTC+7)

| Persebri Batanghari | 2–0 | PS PLN Jambi |
|---|---|---|
| | Report |

KONI Batanghari Stadium, Batanghari

17 February 2025
15:00 WIB (UTC+7)

| Persitaj | 0–2 | Patriot Bungo |
|---|---|---|
| | Report |

KONI Batanghari Stadium, Batanghari

=== Final ===
19 February 2025
14:30 WIB (UTC+7)

| Persebri Batanghari | 2–0 | Patriot Bungo |
|---|---|---|
| | Report |

KONI Batanghari Stadium, Batanghari

== See also ==
- 2024–25 Liga 4
