= Air Hitam =

Air Hitam may refer to:

== Places ==
=== Indonesia ===
- Air Hitam, Sarolangun, a district in Sarolangun Regency, Jambi
- Air Hitam, a district in West Lampung Regency, Lampung

=== Malaysia ===
- Ayer Hitam, a town in Batu Pahat District, Johor
