= Beatrix Bridge =

Bridge in Sarolangun Regency, Jambi

Beatrix
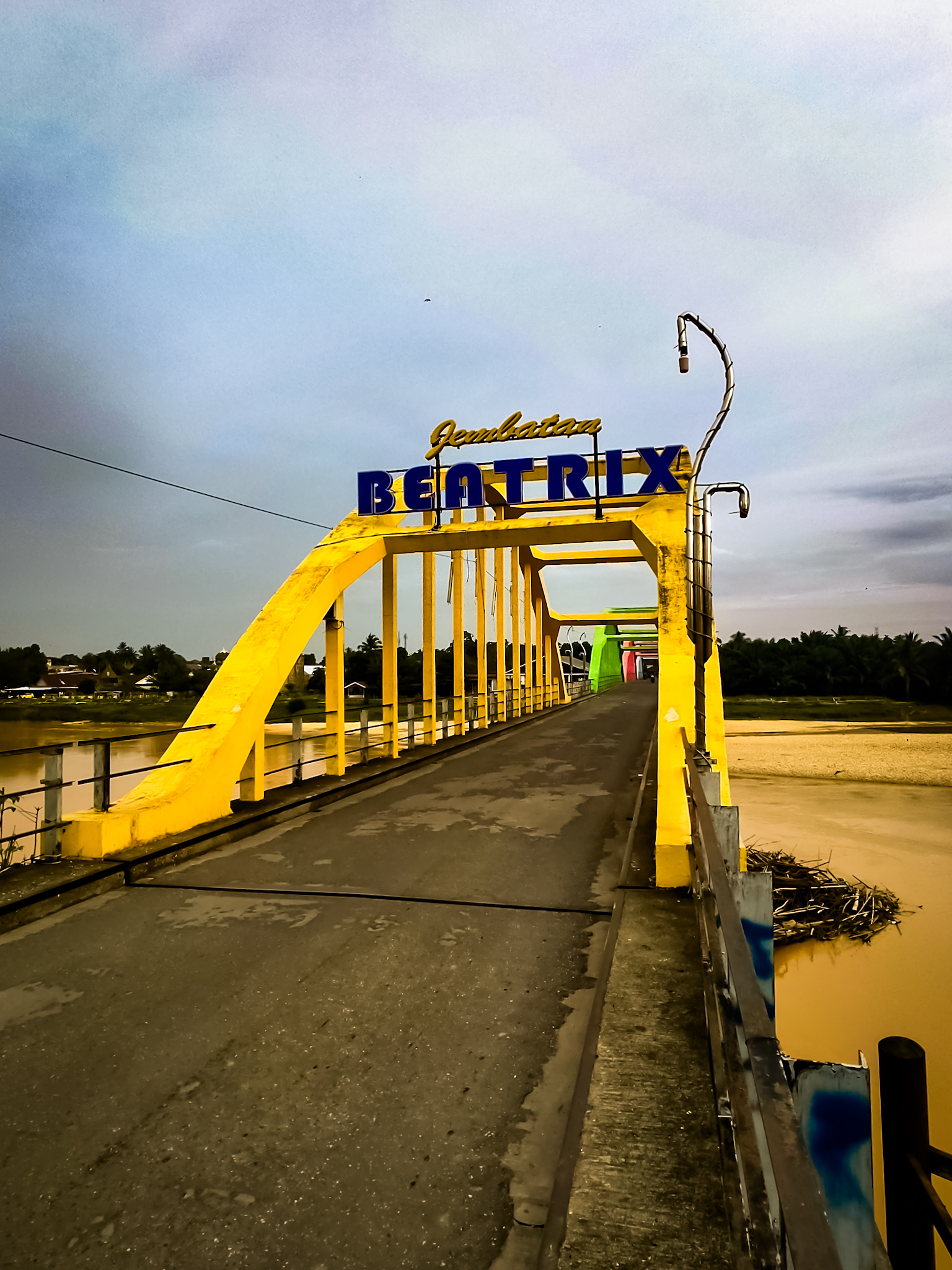
- Beatrix in 2024
- Coordinates: 2°18′20″S 102°43′24″E
- Crosses: Batang Asai River
- Locale: Sarolangun Regency, Jambi
- Official name: Beatrix Brug

Characteristics
- Total length: 197.4 metres (648 ft)
- Width: 4 metres (13 ft)

History
- Construction start: 1937
- Construction end: 1939
- Construction cost: 150 guilder
- Opened: 1939

Beatrix Bridge is a bridge in Jambi Province which is full of stories of the twists and turns of the entry of Dutch colonialism into Sarolangun Regency. The Beatrix Bridge was built in 1937 and inaugurated in 1939. The history of the construction of this bridge is also inseparable from the forced labor carried out by thousands of Indonesian people.

== History ==
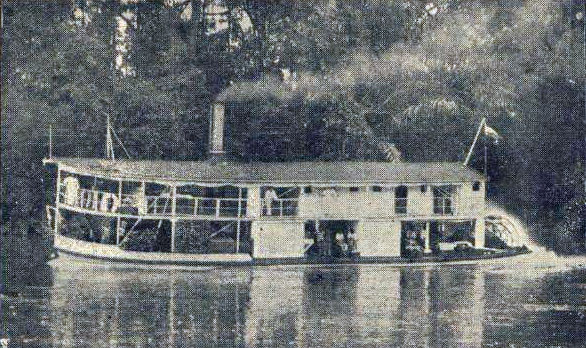
Sarolangun Ophelia Delftsche Courant December 23, 1931

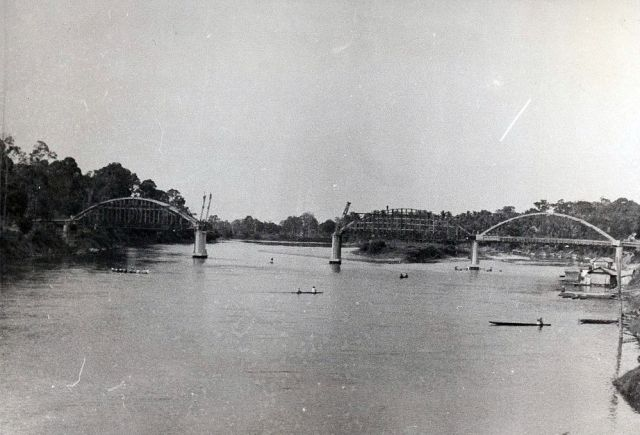
Beatrix Bridge circa 1938

The initial construction of the Beatrix Bridge was based on the sinking of the Hekwieler Ophelia. Ophelia is a wheeled vessel designed specifically for shallow water transportation. Where the purpose of the ship was to collect taxes and agricultural products from the Sarolangun community. When the Dutch colonized under the rule of Queen Wilhelmina Helena Pauline, their headquarters were located near the Batang Tembesi River, which is now the official residence of the Sarolangun regent. Because the Ophelia ship sank and claimed the lives of high-ranking Dutch officials, in 1937, the Dutch government built a bridge as a means of trade transportation. Workers were brought in from Java Island. Then forced labor occurred. So many people died, due to exhaustion or persecution by the Dutch soldiers.

In 1938, the bridge was officially named Beatrix because in 1938, Princess Beatrix Wilhelmina Armgard was born. The name Beatrix was given by the Dutch colonial government as a birth gift to the granddaughter of Queen Wilhelmina who was ruling the Netherlands at that time.

In 1939, the bridge was inaugurated, and there is a granite stone inscription that reads the name of the bridge "Beatrix Brug," while on the right is written "Bt Tembesi." This bridge stands firmly above the Batang Tembesi River, has a length of 197.4 meters and a width of four meters, with four arches. The Beatrix Bridge is an alternative connecting route between Sri Pelayang Village and Sarolangun Lower Market. On the north side, this bridge connects to Bangko and West Sumatra, while on the south side it leads to Lubuk Linggau and South Sumatra. The construction costs of Betrix during the Dutch colonial period were estimated at 150 guilders.

In 1973, the Beatrix Bridge suffered damage at the end of the bridge and could no longer be used. Instead, the Indonesian government built a new bridge located to the right of the Beatrix Bridge. This new bridge connects the Trans-Sumatra highway which passes through Jambi Province.

In 2000, after 27 years of not functioning, because it had historical value and potential to become a tourist attraction, the Sarolangun Regency Government repaired the damaged part of the bridge.

On January 13, 2024, following the increasing water discharge in the Tembesi River, the Sarolangun Regency Government temporarily closed the Beatrix Bridge. From the monitoring, the temporary closure of the Beatrix Bridge was due to the consideration that the water level of the Tembesi River was increasing, and the triangular iron support on the middle pillar was broken, even though the water level was only about 2 meters away from touching the bridge floor. Another factor that causes the supporting iron to shift is the rubbish and wooden beams carried by the flood and caught on the supporting iron pillars of the bridge.
