= Muara Bungo Airport =

Muara Bungo Airport Bandar Udara Muara Bungo
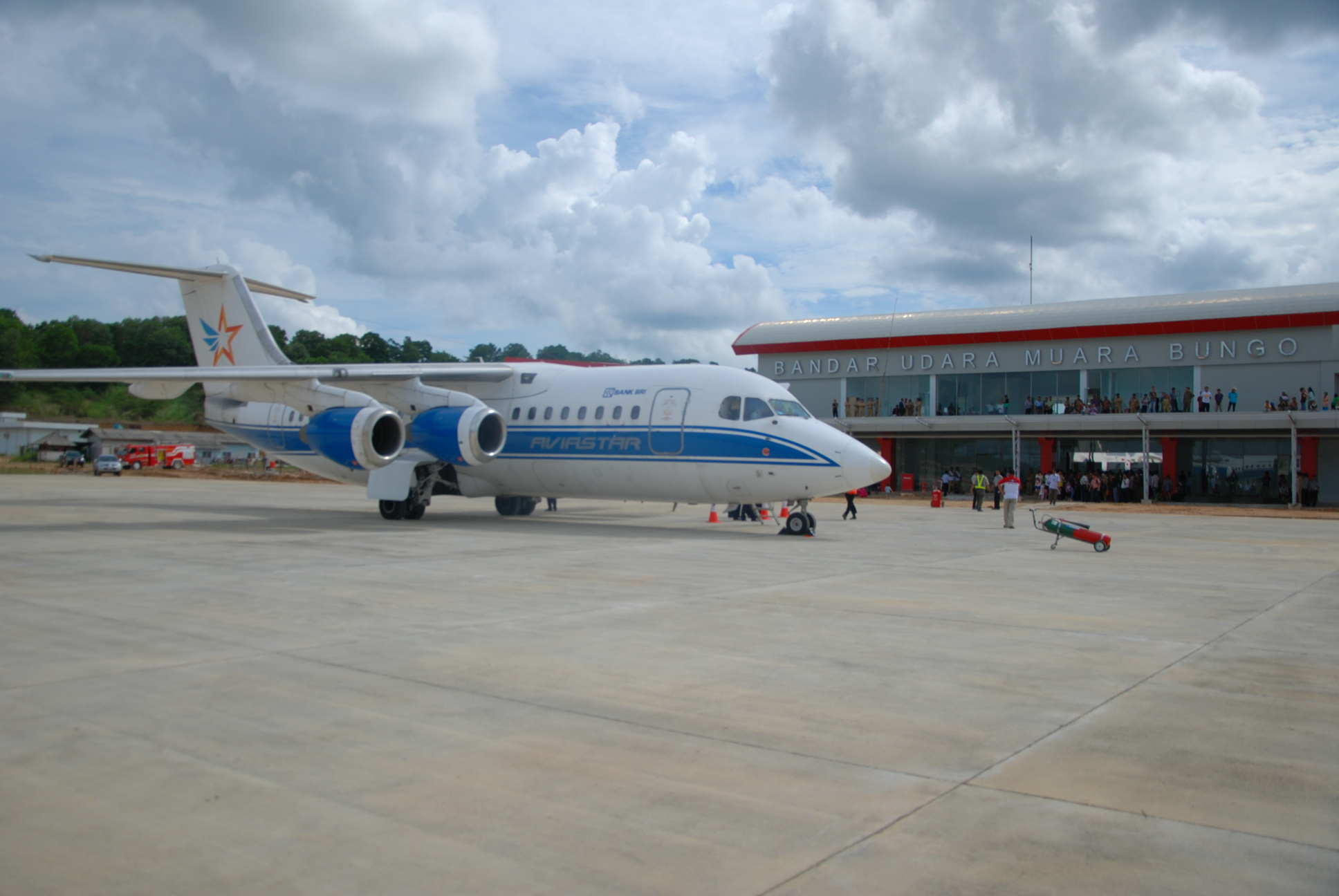
- IATA: BUU; ICAO: WIJB

Summary
- Airport type: Civil
- Operator: Government Bungo Regency
- Serves: Muara Bungo
- Location: Bungo Regency, Jambi, Indonesia
- Coordinates: 01°32′33″S 102°10′58″E
- Website: mrb.informasibandara.org

Map
- Location in Sumatra Location in Indonesia

Runways
Direction	Length		Surface
Direction	m	ft	Surface
13/31	2,100	6,890	Asphalt

Muara Bungo Airport (IATA: BUU, ICAO: WIJB) is an airport in Muara Bungo, Jambi, Indonesia. The airport started operating on November 25, 2012.

Until October 2014 only Aviastar used the airport three times a week due to the runway being only 1,350 meters long. Runway extension is still ongoing; it was predicted to be 1,500 meters at the end of 2014 and expected to reach its final 2,000 meters at the end of 2015.

Around 2016, runway extension for Muara Bungo Airport was finished. On July 3, 2016, Sriwijaya Air inaugurated four weekly flight from Jakarta to Muara Bungo using Boeing 737-500 aircraft. Sriwijaya Air later transferred this route to NAM Air and increased the frequency to daily flights.

== Airlines and destinations ==
Airlines	Destinations
Batik Air	Jakarta–Soekarno-Hatta (begins 15 June 2026)
NAM Air	Jakarta–Soekarno-Hatta
