= 2024 Jambi gubernatorial election =

- 27 November 2024
- Turnout: 72.98% (▲5.07pp)
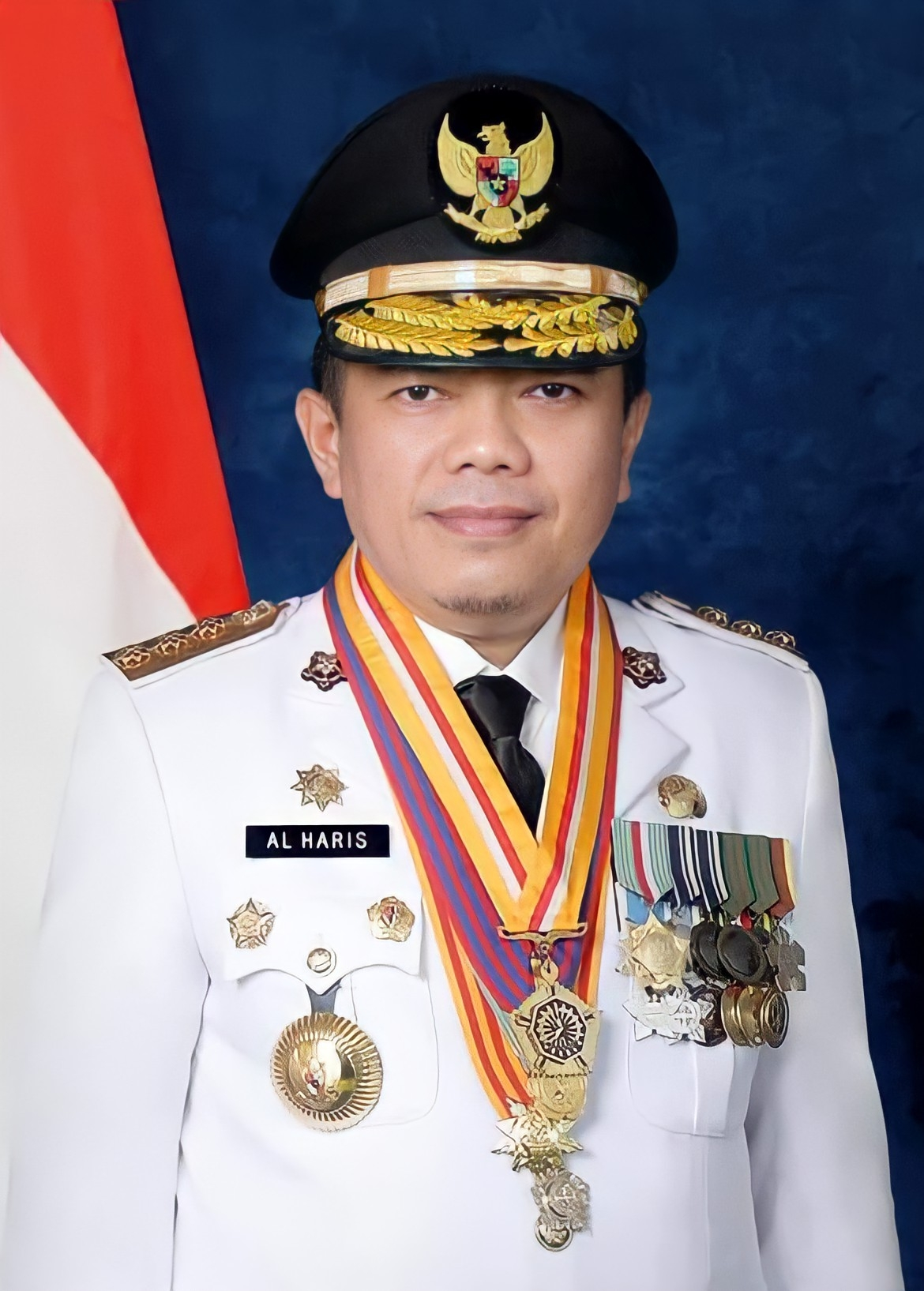

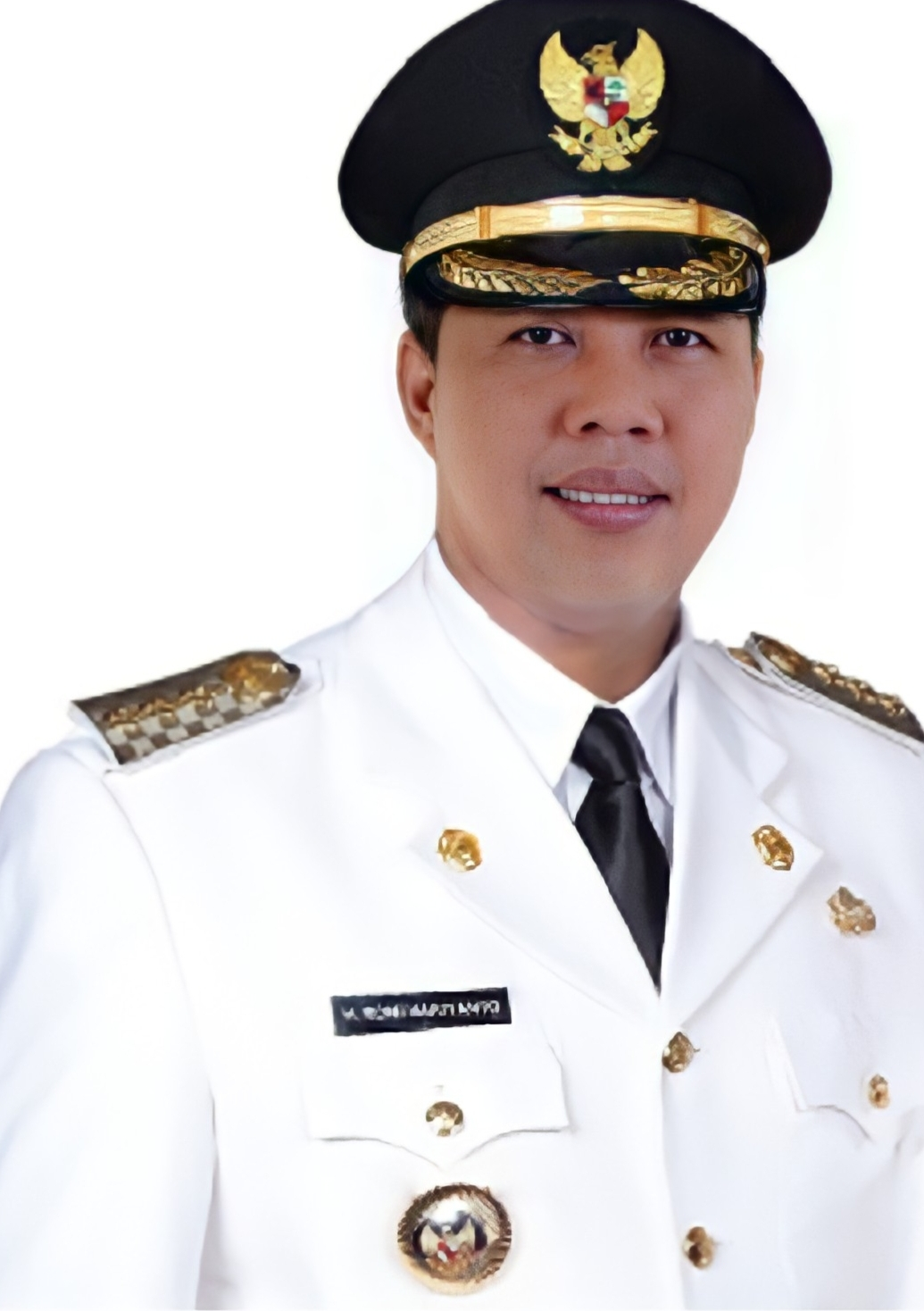
Candidate	Al Haris	Romi Hariyanto
Party	PAN	PAN (Note: Despite Romi being a member of PAN, the party instead backed Al Haris. Romi was nominated by NasDem, PSI, PKN and Gelora.)
Alliance	KIM Plus	–
Running mate	Abdullah Sani	Sudirman
Popular vote	1,092,823	698,265
Percentage	61.01%	38.99%
- Results map by district
Governor before election
Al Haris
PAN
Elected Governor
Al Haris
PAN

The 2024 Jambi gubernatorial election was held on 27 November 2024 as part of nationwide local elections to elect the governor of Jambi for a five-year term. The previous election was held in 2020. Governor Al Haris of the National Mandate Party (PAN) won re-election in a landslide with 61% of the vote. His sole opponent Romi Hariyanto, the East Tanjung Jabung regent and fellow PAN member who was nominated by the NasDem Party, received 38%.

== Electoral system ==
The election, like other local elections in 2024, follow the first-past-the-post system where the candidate with the most votes wins the election, even if they do not win a majority. It is possible for a candidate to run uncontested, in which case the candidate is still required to win a majority of votes "against" an "empty box" option. Should the candidate fail to do so, the election will be repeated on a later date.

== Candidates ==
According to electoral regulations, in order to qualify for the election, candidates were required to secure support from a political party or a coalition of parties controlling 11 seats (20 percent of all seats) in the Jambi Regional House of Representatives (DPRD). As no parties won 11 or more seats in the 2024 legislative election, coalitions between parties must be formed in order to nominate a candidate. Candidates may alternatively demonstrate support to run as an independent in form of photocopies of identity cards, which in Jambi's case corresponds to 227,470 copies. No independent candidates registered with the General Elections Commission (KPU) prior to the set deadline.

=== Declared ===
These are candidates who have been allegedly delegated by political parties endorsing for gubernatorial election:

1
Candidate from PAN and Golkar
Romi Hariyanto	Sudirman
for Governor	for Vice Governor
Regent of East Tanjung Jabung (2021-)	Commander of Training, Education, Doctrine, and Seniora Indonesian National Army (2020-2021)
Parties
5 / 55 (9%) NasDem (5 seats)

2
Candidate from PAN and PKB
Al Haris	Abdullah Sani
for Governor	for Vice Governor
Governor of Jambi	Vice Governor of Jambi
Parties
50 / 55 (91%) PAN (10 seats); Golkar (7 seats); PKB (6 seats); Gerindra (6 seats); PDI-P (6 seats); PKS (5 seats); Demokrat (5 seats); PPP (5 seats)

=== Potential ===
The following are individuals who have either been publicly mentioned as a potential candidate by a political party in the DPRD, publicly declared their candidacy with press coverage, or considered as a potential candidate by media outlets:

- Al Haris (PAN), incumbent governor.

- Abdullah Sani (PKB), incumbent vice governor (as running mate).

- Romi Hariyanto (PAN), regent of East Tanjung Jabung.

== Political map ==
Following the 2024 Indonesian legislative election, nine political parties are represented in the Jambi DPRD:

Political parties	Seat count
National Mandate Party (PAN)	10 / 55
Party of Functional Groups (Golkar)	7 / 55
Indonesian Democratic Party of Struggle (PDI-P)	6 / 55
Great Indonesia Movement Party (Gerindra)	6 / 55
National Awakening Party (PKB)	6 / 55
NasDem Party	5 / 55
Prosperous Justice Party (PKS)	5 / 55
Democratic Party (Demokrat)	5 / 55
United Development Party (PPP)	5 / 55

== Results ==
Candidate	Running mate	Party	Votes	%
Al Haris	Abdullah Sani	National Mandate Party	1,092,823	61.01
Romi Hariyanto	Sudirman	National Mandate Party	698,265	38.99
Total			1,791,088	100.00
Valid votes			1,791,088	91.05
Invalid votes			175,982	8.95
Total votes			1,967,070	100.00
Registered voters/turnout			2,695,348	72.98
Source: KPU Jambi
