= PS Muaro Jambi =

Indonesian football club

- Full name: Persatuan Sepakbola Muaro Jambi
- Nicknames: Sumatra Elephant; Bujang Mudo Warriors
- Founded: 1999; 27 years ago
- Ground: Tri Lomba Juang KONI Stadium; Jambi
- Capacity: 6,000
- Owner: Jambi Government
- Chairman: Rakhmad Juniadi
- Manager: Rahmad
- Coach: Hengky Ardiles
- League: Liga 3
- 2021: 2nd, (Jambi zone)
Home colours	Away colours

Persatuan Sepakbola Muaro Jambi (simply known as PS Muaro Jambi) is an Indonesian football club based in Muaro Jambi Regency, Jambi. They currently compete in the Liga 4. The club plays its home matches at the Tri Lomba Juang KONI Stadium.

== Honours ==
- Liga 3 Jambi
  - Runner-up: 2021
- Jambi Governor Cup
  - Runner-up: 2022
