= Adi Darma =

Indonesian politician (1960–2020)

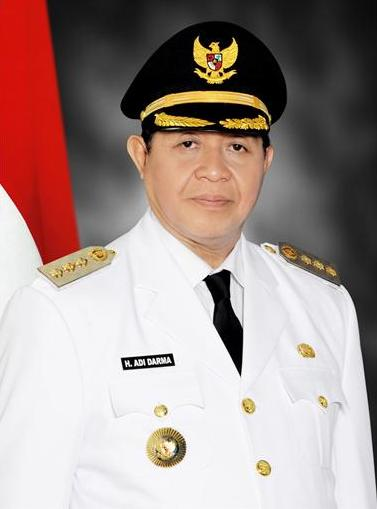

Mayor of Bontang
- In office 2011–2016
- Preceded by: A. Sofyan Hasdam
- Succeeded by: Neni Moerniaeni

Personal details
- Born: April 29, 1960 Indonesia Tenggarong
- Died: October 1, 2020 (aged 60) Indonesia Bontang
- Spouse(s): Hj. Najirah, S.E.
- Education: Mulawarman University; Dr. Soetomo University

Adi Darma (29 April 1960 – 1 October 2020) was an Indonesian politician and civil servant, member of the Golkar Party.

Darma was born on 29 April 1960 in Tenggarong, Kutai Kartanegara Regency. He graduated from the local state high school in 1981, and moved to Samarinda to study at Mulawarman University. He graduated in 1988, and began to work as a civil servant at the municipal government of Bontang.

He served as mayor of Bontang from 2011 to 2016, but lost the 2015 elections to Neni Moerniaeni, who became the first female mayor of Bontang in March 2016.

In 2020 Darma ran for another term as mayor of Bontang, but on 23 September, during the COVID-19 pandemic in Indonesia, he tested positive for COVID-19. He was admitted to the Tama Husada Hospital in Bontang, where he died on 1 October, aged 60.
