= Syarif Fasha =

Indonesian politician (born 1968)

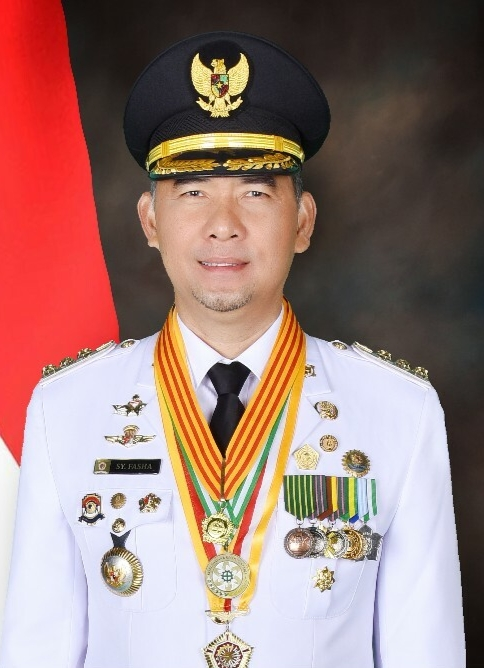
- Official portrait

Member of Parliament for Jambi
- Incumbent
- Assumed office 1 October 2024
- Preceded by: Hasbi Anshory

Mayor of Jambi
- In office 4 November 2013 – 4 November 2023
- Preceded by: Bambang Priyanto
- Succeeded by: Sri Purwaningsih (act.)

Personal details
- Born: 12 May 1968 (age 58) Palembang, South Sumatra, Indonesia
- Party: NasDem Party

Syarif Fasha (born 12 May 1968) is an Indonesian politician of the NasDem Party and businessman who served as the mayor of the city of Jambi for two terms between 2013 and 2023. He will serve in the House of Representatives representing Jambi province for the 2024–2029 term.

== Early life ==
Syarif Fasha was born on 12 May 1968 in Plaju, today part of Palembang city. He studied in Palembang, graduating from high school in 1987 before receiving a diploma at a polytechnic in Palembang in 1990.

== Career ==
After graduating from the polytechnic, Fasha began to work in the construction industry. He initially worked as an engineering supervisor before later starting his own business, eventually expanding into construction, mining, and equipment leasing.

In 2013, he ran for the mayoralship of the city of Jambi, and won the election with 88,454 votes (35.36%). He was reelected for a second term in the 2018 mayoral election with 84,068 votes (44.77%). Fasha did not accept the mayoral salary during his tenure. In 2019, he was awarded the Bintang Jasa Pratama (Star of Service) by president Joko Widodo.

Fasha initially declared that he will run as governor of Jambi province in the 2020 election, but shelved his run after failing to secure enough support from political parties. On 9 May 2023, he submitted his resignation as mayor in order to run as a Nasdem candidate for the House of Representatives in the 2024 legislative election. He won a seat after securing 72,885 votes, replacing Hasbi Anshory as the sole Nasdem representative from Jambi.

== Family ==
He is married to Yuliana Fasha, and the couple has two living children. During the COVID-19 pandemic in Indonesia, Syarif along with Yuliana and their children were infected, and their third child died from the illness in September 2020.
