= Merangin F.C. =

Indonesian football club

Merangin FC
- Full name: Merangin Football Club
- Nickname: Laskar Harimau Kumbang (Panther Warriors)
- Founded: 1970; 56 years ago
- Ground: Bumi Masurai Stadium; Merangin, Jambi
- Capacity: 7,000
- Owner: Marangin Regency Government
- Manager: Karno Dwiyanto
- Head coach: Karno Dwiyanto
- League: Liga 4
- 2024–25: 3rd, in Group B (Jambi zone)
Home colours	Away colours

Merangin Football Club, commonly known as simply Merangin FC, is an Indonesia association football club based in Merangin Regency, Jambi. The football club currently plays in Liga 4 which is the last tier in Indonesian football. In 2016, Merangin FC became the champion of 2016 ISC Liga Nusantara Jambi zone, as well as representing Jambi province in the national round of Liga Nusantara.

== Stadium ==
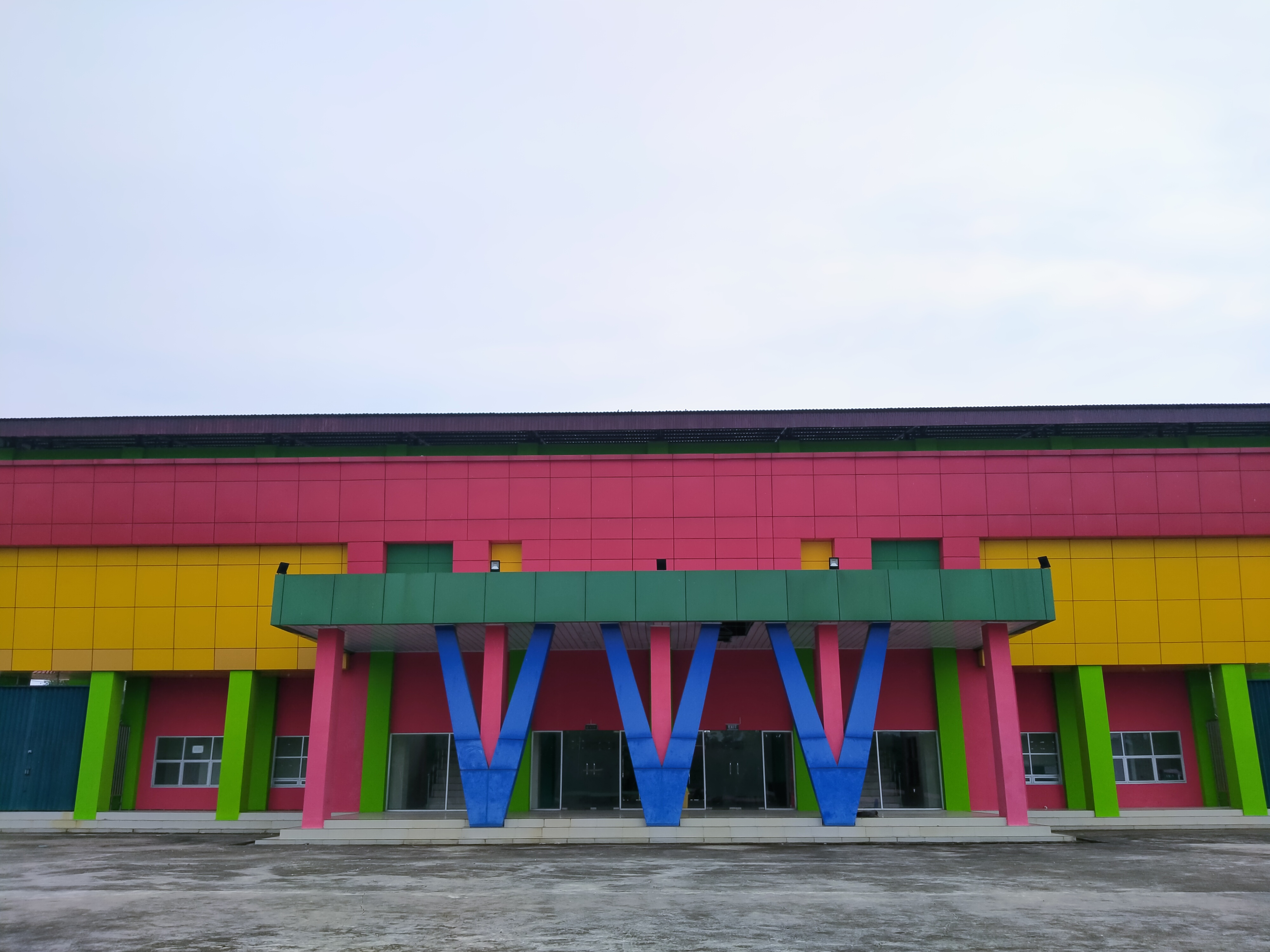
Bumi Masurai Stadium

Merangin FC play their home matches at Bumi Masurai Stadium

== Honours ==
- Liga Nusantara Jambi
  - Champions (1): 2016
- Jambi's Governor Cup
  - Champions (3): 2012, 2019, 2020
  - Runners-up (4): 2009, 2011, 2013, 2015
