= Persisko 1960 =

Indonesian football club

- Full name: Persatuan Sepakbola Indonesia Seluruh Bangko 1960
- Nickname: Laskar Paduka
- Founded: 1960; 66 years ago
- Ground: Bumi Masurai Stadium, Merangin Regency, Jambi
- Capacity: 7,000
- Owner: PSSI Merangin Regency
- Chairman: Herman Efendi
- Coach: Adi Fernandes
- League: Liga 4
- 2024–25: 4th, in Group B (Jambi zone)
Home colours	Away colours

Persatuan Sepakbola Indonesia Seluruh Bangko 1960, commonly known as Persisko 1960, is an Indonesian football club based in Merangin Regency, Jambi. They currently compete in the Liga 4.

== Stadium ==
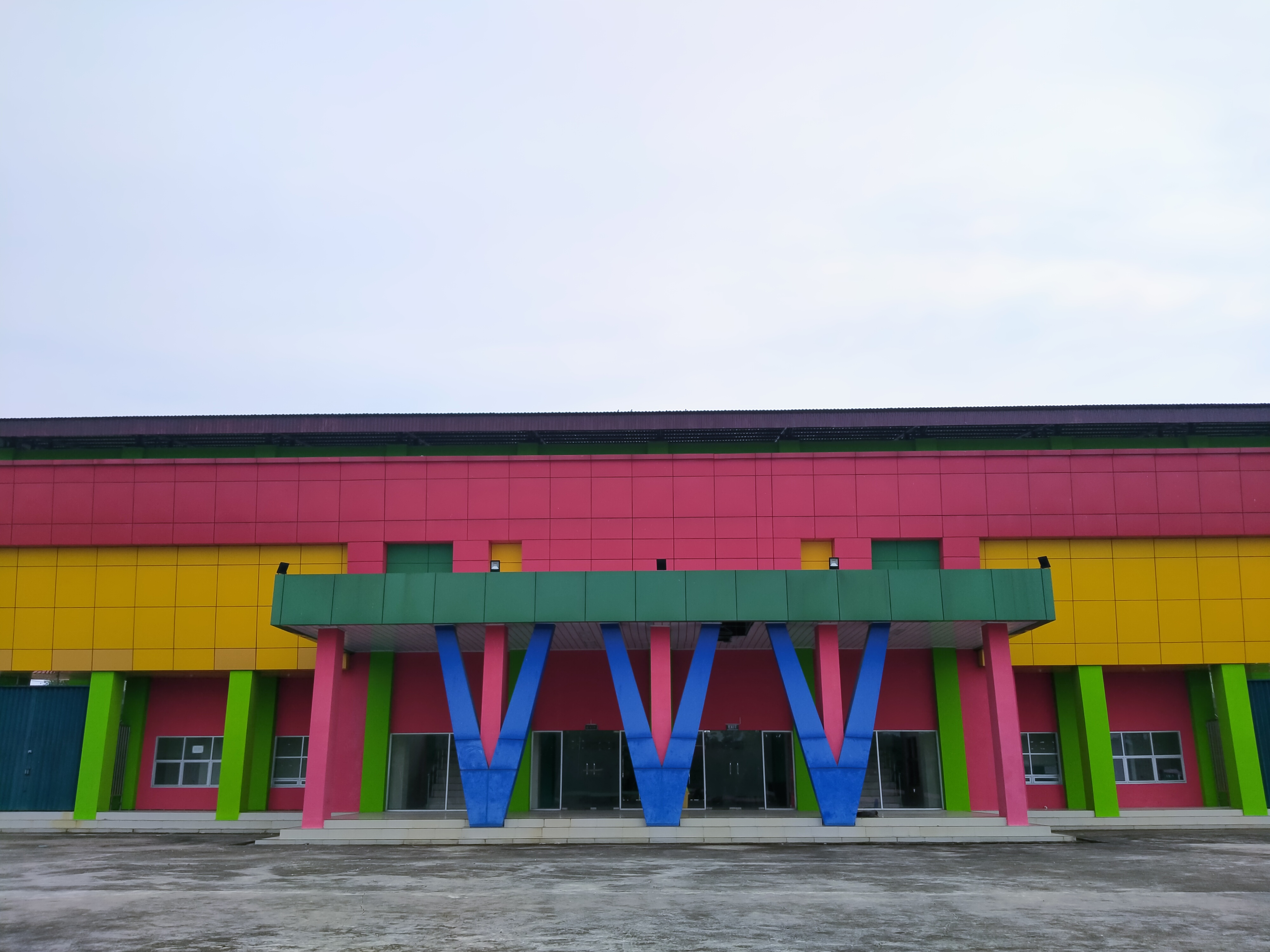
Bumi Masurai Stadium

Persisko 1960 play their home matches at the Bumi Masurai Stadium.
