= Persitaj West Tanjung Jabung =

Indonesian football club

Persitaj Tanjabbar
- Full name: Persatuan Sepakbola Indonesia Tanjung Jabung Barat
- Nickname: Laskar Lancang Kuning
- Ground: Persitaj Stadium; Kuala Tungkal, West Tanjung Jabung Regency
- Capacity: 5,000
- Owner: Askab PSSI Tanjung Jabung Barat
- Chairman: Husaini
- Coach: Sazali
- League: Liga 4
- 2024–25: Semi-finals, (Jambi zone)
Home colours	Away colours

Persatuan Sepakbola Indonesia Tanjung Jabung Barat, commonly known as Persitaj Tanjabbar, or Persitaj, is an Indonesian football club based in Kuala Tungkal, West Tanjung Jabung Regency, Jambi. They are competing in Liga 4 and their homeground is Persitaj Stadium.
