= Air Hitam, Jambi =

District in Jambi, Indonesia

Air Hitam
- District
- Interactive map of Air Hitam
- Coordinates: 1°59′50″S 102°41′49″E
- Country: Indonesia
- Province: Jambi
- Regency: Sarolangun

Area
  - Total: 63,676 km^{2} (24,585 sq mi)

Population (2023)
  - Total: 26,527
  - Density: 0.41659/km^{2} (1.0790/sq mi)
- Time zone: UTC+7 (WIB)
- Postal Code: 37490

Air Hitam is an administrative district (kecamatan) in Sarolangun Regency, Jambi, Indonesia.
