= PS Kerinci =

Indonesian football club in Jambi

- Full name: Persatuan Sepakbola Kerinci
- Nicknames: Laskar Uhang Kito (Our People Warriors); Kelinci Sumatera (The Sumatran Rabbit)
- Ground: Kerinci Mini Stadium; Kerinci, Jambi
- Capacity: 5,000
- Owner: Askab PSSI Kerinci
- Chairman: Yudi Herman
- Manager: Vidra Novianto
- Coach: Asril Ramli
- League: Liga 3
- 2021: Quarter-finals, (Jambi zone)
Home colours	Away colours	Third colours

Persatuan Sepakbola Kerinci (simply known as PS Kerinci) is an Indonesian football club based in Kerinci Regency, Jambi. They currently compete in the Liga 3.

== Honour ==
- Runner-up Gubernur Cup 2020

== Supporter ==
Supporter of PS Kerinci is Kerinci Fans Club.

== Mascot ==
Mascot of PS Kerinci is Andalas Rabbit (Sumatran striped rabbit), because Mount Kerinci is habitat of Andalas Rabbit. The philosophy of Rabbit is: agility, alert, caution, self-protection.
