= Nipah Panjang =

District in Jambi, Indonesia

- Interactive map of Nipah Panjang
- Country: Indonesia
- Province: Jambi
- Regency: East Tanjung Jabung Regency

Nipah Panjang is a coastal district in East Tanjung Jabung Regency, Jambi Province, Indonesia. It includes the estuary of the Batang Hari River.

== Localities ==
- Pemusiran
