= Jambi United F.C. =

Indonesian football club in Jambi

Jambi United Football Club
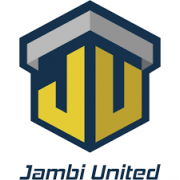
- Full name: Jambi United Football Club
- Nickname: Laskar Rajo Betuah (Rajo Betuah Warriors)
- Short name: JUFC
- Founded: 2018; 8 years ago
- Ground: Tri Lomba Juang KONI Stadium; Jambi
- Capacity: 6,000
- Owner: Arie Dwi Debrata
- CEO: Ipal Gusti Ependi
- Coach: Oktavianus
- League: Liga 4
- 2023: 3rd, Group B
Home colours	Away colours

Jambi United Football Club (simply known as JUFC or Jambi United) is an Indonesian football club based in Jambi, Jambi. They currently compete in the Liga 4 and their homeground is Tri Lomba Juang KONI Stadium.

== History ==
Jambi United was established by Arie Dwi Debrata in 2018. Arie Dwi Debrata as one of the owners of Jambi United said that the establishment of the club aims to be a forum for young players from Jambi to be able to develop talent and increase opportunities to appear in the top caste of national football. Even though it is a new club, Jambi United's name has started to steal attention, especially in a number of social media, not about achievements, but the courage of the club owner who uses a logo similar to the Serie A club, Juventus, as the club's pride logo, he was inspired by Juventus in building the club, it was even acknowledged that the founders of the club were all La Vecchia Signora fans.

== Players ==
=== Current squad ===
As of 31 August 2021

Note: Flags indicate national team as defined under FIFA eligibility rules; some limited exceptions apply. Players may hold more than one non-FIFA nationality.

No.	Pos.	Nation	Player
1	GK	IDN	Muhamad Ridwan
4	DF	IDN	Yudha Kurnia
5	MF	IDN	Hasian Sapoetra
6	MF	IDN	Anang kurniawan
7	FW	IDN	Yusuf Dwiansyah
8	FW	IDN	Aldi Krismon
9	FW	IDN	Adam Fiqra
10	FW	IDN	Ahmad Ridho
11	FW	IDN	Adira Erwanda
12	DF	IDN	Alief Vicky
14	DF	IDN	Rahmansyah Amabel
15	DF	IDN	Rifki Silitonga
16	MF	IDN	Muhammad Hambali

No.	Pos.	Nation	Player
17	DF	IDN	Rian Fadriansyah
19	MF	IDN	Muhammad Gerry
21	DF	IDN	Dandi Mardiana
24	GK	IDN	Malvino Rizky
28	DF	IDN	Arief Julianto
29	FW	IDN	Dedi Haryudi
30	MF	IDN	Jalesh Putra
31	GK	IDN	Fajril Rifaldo
33	DF	IDN	Muhammad Rivaldi
74	DF	IDN	Rishad Firman
88	MF	IDN	Bima Sakti
98	DF	IDN	Hendra Saputra

== Honours ==
- Liga 3 Jambi
  - Champion: 2021
