= Air Hitam, Lampung =

District in Lampung, Indonesia

Air Hitam
- District
- Interactive map of Air Hitam
- Coordinates: 5°5′1.76971″S 104°25′0.81318″E
- Country: Indonesia
- Province: Lampung
- Regency: West Lampung

Area
  - Total: 108.12 km^{2} (41.75 sq mi)

Population (2020)
  - Total: 11,630
  - Density: 107.6/km^{2} (278.6/sq mi)
- Time zone: UTC+7 (WIB)
- Postal Code: 34866

Air Hitam is an administrative district (kecamatan) in West Lampung Regency, Lampung, Indonesia.
