= Persikota Sungai Penuh =

Indonesian football club

- Full name: Persatuan Sepak Bola Indonesia Kota Sungai Penuh
- Nicknames: Harimau Kerinci (Kerinci Tigers); Laskar Puncak Khayangan (Puncak Khayangan Warriors)
- Founded: 2010; 16 years ago
- Ground: KONI Sungai Penuh Stadium; Sungai Penuh, Jambi
- Capacity: 5,000
- Owner: Askot PSSI Sungai Penuh
- Manager: Ade Utama
- Head coach: Rahmat
- League: Liga 4
- 2024–25: 4th, in Group A (Jambi zone)
Home colours	Away colours

Persatuan Sepak Bola Indonesia Kota Sungai Penuh, commonly known as simply Persikota Sungai Penuh, is an Indonesia association football club based in Sungai Penuh, Jambi. As of October 2021, the football club plays in Liga 4 which is the last tier in Indonesian football.
