= Al Haris =

Indonesian politician

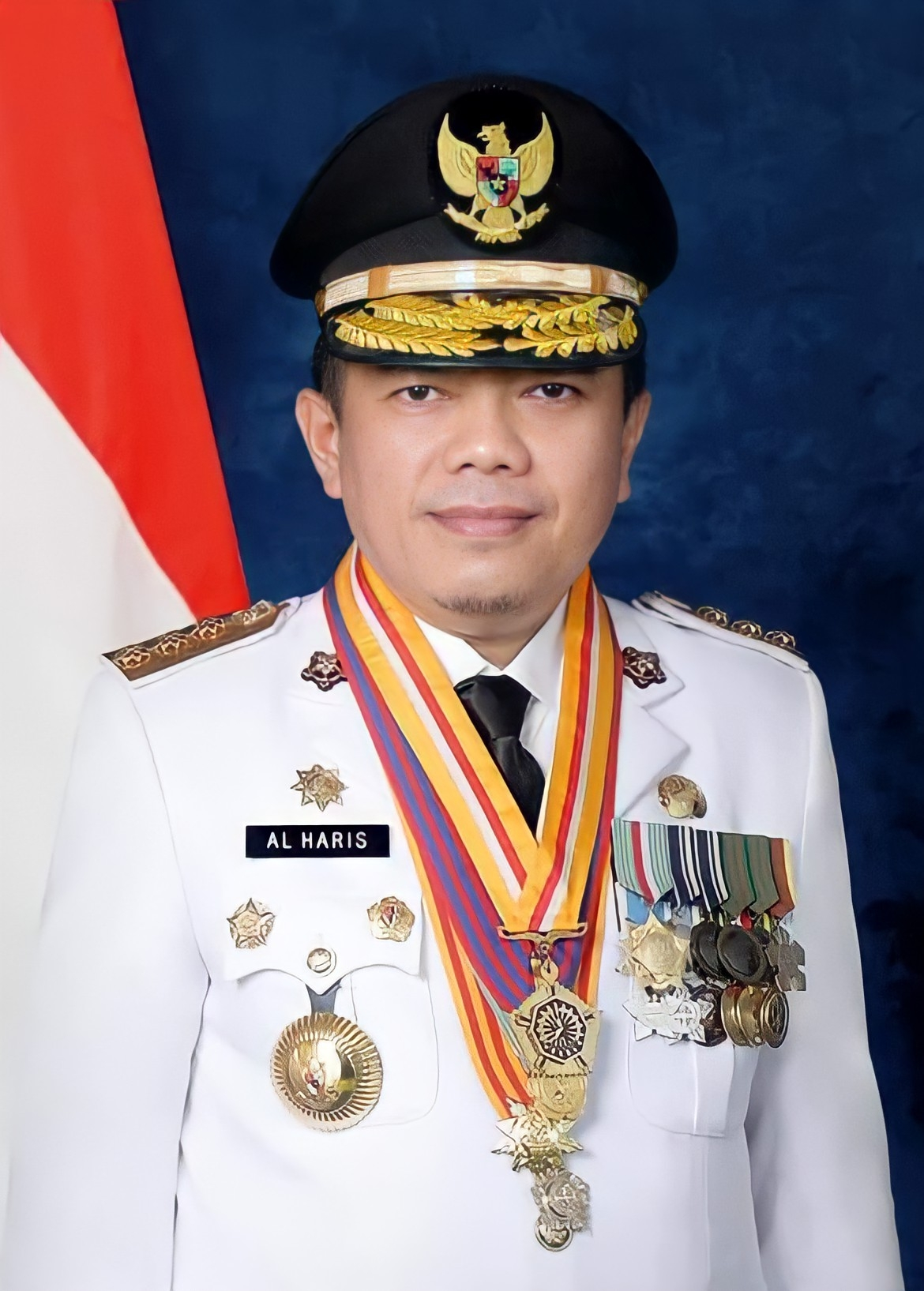

Governor of Jambi
- Incumbent
- Assumed office 7 July 2021
- Deputy: Abdullah Sani
- Preceded by: Fachrori Umar

Regent of Merangin
- In office 6 August 2013 – 7 July 2021
- Preceded by: Nalim
- Succeeded by: Mashuri

Personal details
- Born: November 23, 1973 (age 52) Merangin, Jambi, Indonesia
- Party: PAN (2020–present)
- Other political affiliations: Golkar (before 2020); KIM Plus (2024–present)

Al Haris (born 23 November 1973) is an Indonesian politician and bureaucrat who has served as the governor of Jambi since 2021. Before becoming governor, he was elected twice as regent of Merangin Regency, serving between 2013 and 2021. He was a civil servant in Jambi for over 20 years before entering politics.

== Early life ==
Al Haris was born in Sekancing village of Merangin Regency in Jambi on 23 November 1973. His father was a farmer. After completing middle school in his home village, he enrolled at a high school in the regency capital of Bangko. He worked odd jobs during school, including selling newspapers and being a shopkeeper.

== Career ==
After completing high school, Haris initially continued to work at various jobs including at a jellyfish processing factory and selling martabak. He was accepted as an employee of Radio Republik Indonesia at Jambi City in 1992. In 1993, he enrolled at the local management academy, graduating in 1998. He was promoted into the provincial government in 1999, and spent some time studying in Bandung. By 2004, he was appointed chief of an administrative village in Jambi City, and by 2011 he had become general bureau chief at the provincial government.

In 2013, with Khafied Moein as his running mate, Haris ran as a regent candidate for Merangin Regency with the support of PDI-P, Golkar, PKS, Gerindra, and a number of minor parties. The pair won 71,059 votes (36.59%) in the four-candidate race, and was elected. Following a dispute at the Constitutional Court of Indonesia, Haris was sworn in as regent on 6 August 2013. He was reelected for a second term following the 2018 regency election, where he secured 84,068 votes (44.77%) in a three-way contest with Mashuri as running mate. During his tenures as regent, he secured substantial central government funding for infrastructure projects in the regency.

He was initially a member of Golkar, but moved to the National Mandate Party in 2020. He ran as a gubernatorial candidate for Jambi province in 2020, and after a repeat vote due to irregularities, won 600,733 votes (38.3%), defeating two other tickets. He was sworn in as governor on 7 July 2021. He was reelected for a second term in the 2024 gubernatorial election.

== Honours ==
- Bintang Legiun Veteran Indonesia
- Lencana Melati
- Lencana Satyawira Utama
- Lencana Darma Bakti
- Lencana Pancawarsa I
- Lencana Pancawarsa II
- Satyalancana Pembangunan
- Satyalancana Wira Karya
- Satyalancana Karya Satya
