= Indah Putri Indriani =

Indonesian politician

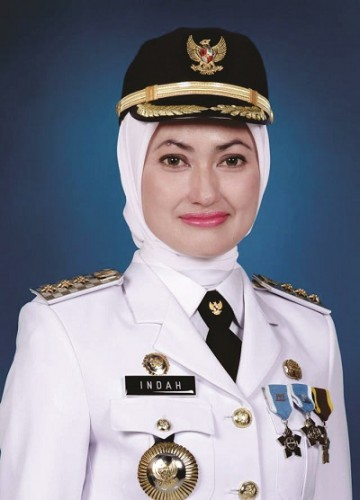

Regent of North Luwu
- In office 17 February 2016 – 20 February 2025
- President: Joko Widodo
- Preceded by: Arifin Junaidi
- Succeeded by: Andi Abdullah Rahim

Personal details
- Born: 7 February 1977 (age 49) Jayapura, Irian Jaya, Indonesia
- Citizenship: Indonesian
- Party: Great Indonesia Movement Party
- Children: 2

Indah Putri Indriani is an Indonesian academic, politician and the regent of North Luwu Regency from 2016 to 2025. She was also the deputy regent of North Luwu from 2010 to 2015.

== Early life ==
Indah Putri Indriani was born on 7 February 1977 in Jayapura. She spent her childhood in Bone-Bone, in North Luwu Regency, where she completed elementary school before she moved to Palopo where she enrolled at a pesantren. She then studied international relations at Hasanuddin University in Makassar, graduating in 1998, and obtained a master's in political science from the University of Indonesia in 2002.

== Career ==
Prior to entering politics, Indriani was active in academia. She lectured at the University of Indonesia for a time, as well as at Bung Karno University and the university of Muhammadiyah in Jakarta. She was also an expert staff in the House of Representatives.

In 2010, Indriani was elected as the running mate of Arifin Junaidi in North Luwu's regency election. During her tenure as deputy regent, Vice Governor Agus Arifin Nu'mang presented Indriani with the Fajar Institute of Pro Otonomi Award for excellence in public participation following her innovations using the USAID-supported Kinerja program.

She contested the 2015 regency election as a regent candidate and defeated Junaidi, winning 90,826 votes (53.6%). When she was sworn in as regent on 17 February 2016, she became the first woman to serve as a regent in South Sulawesi. Her work with the Kinerja program continued into her tenure as regent due to her devotion to the issue of education equality as well as her efforts to make regency budgeting data publicly available to all citizens. Her interest in educational policy began when she attempted to transfer a teacher between regional schools, leading the woman to threaten her at gunpoint; Indriani claims the confrontation made her realize that people affected by decisions must be involved in making them. She won reelection in 2020.

== Family ==
She is married to Muhammad Fauzi, a member of the House of Representatives from the Golkar party and chairman of the party's North Luwu branch. Fauzi ran to succeed Indriani in North Luwu's 2024 election, but was defeated by Andi Abdullah Rahim. The couple has two daughters.
