= Persikoja Jambi =

Persikoja
- Full name: Persatuan Sepakbola Indonesia Kota Jambi
- Nickname: Angso Duo (The Two Geese)
- Founded: 2010; 16 years ago
- Ground: Persijam Stadium; Jambi City, Jambi
- Capacity: 5,000
- Owner: Askot PSSI Jambi
- Chairman: Ade Apriadi
- Coach: Alexander Saununu
- League: Liga 3
- 2023: Runner-up, (Jambi zone)
Home colours	Away colours

Persatuan Sepakbola Indonesia Kota Jambi, commonly known as Persikoja, is an Indonesian football club based in Jambi City, Jambi. They currently compete in the Liga 3 Jambi Zone.
