= Muara Bungo =

Coordinates: 1.484°S 102.117°E

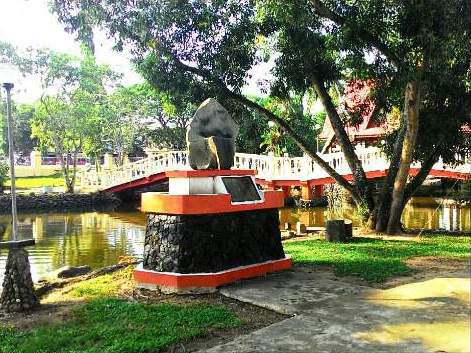
A park in Muara Bungo

Muara Bungo is a town in the Indonesian province of Jambi, Sumatra. It is the administrative capital of Bungo Regency, a regency (kabupaten) in Sumatra. It has a land area of 9.21 km^{2}, and had a population of 21,243 as of the 2020 census; the official estimate as at mid 2024 was 21,703, comprising the five kelurahan which make up the official town (Bungo Barat, Bungo Timur, Batang Bungo, Jaya Setia and Tanjung Gedang).

Other kelurahan in the adjacent Bungo Dani District (Sungai Pinang and Sungai Kerjan) and Rimbo Tengah District (Cadika and Pasih Putih) form part of the built-up area of the town, while the three kelurahan of Bathin III District (Bungo Taman Agung, Manggis and Sungai Binjai) adjoin it on the north side of the Batang Hari River and the Benit River. Altogether this comprised 75,249 inhabitants in an area of 84.84 km^{2}.

== Area and Population ==
Name of district (kecamatan)	Name of urban village (kelurahan)	Area in km^{2}	Pop'n census 2010	Pop'n estimate mid 2023
Pasar Muara Bungo	Bungo Barat (West Bungo)	0.66	4,415	3,744
Pasar Muara Bungo	Batang Bungo	0.65	5,531	4,657
Pasar Muara Bungo	Bungo Timur (East Bungo)	0.63	3,758	3,330
Pasar Muara Bungo	Jaya Setia	6.45	5,815	6,733
Pasar Muara Bungo	Tanjung Gedang	0.86	2,747	2,862
Total town		9.21	22,266	21,326
Bungo Dani	Sungai Kerjan	14.06	7,069	7,526
Bungo Dani	Sungai Pinang	2.11	9,134	9,845
Rimbo Tengah	Cadika	7.17	6,374	7,842
Rimbo Tengah	Pasir Putih	4.03	9,820	11,819
Bathin III	Bungo Taman Agung	3.30	2,212	2,582
Bathin III	Manggis	19.09		8,703
Bathin III	Sungai Binjai	5.67		5,606

== Geography ==
=== Waterways ===
The town lies of the south bank of the Batang Hari River. The Benit River, a tributary of the Batang Hari, runs through Muara Bungo before merging with the Batang Hari, and proven gold deposits in the river within Muara Bungo were estimated at 1,383 kilograms (3,049 lb) in 2005.

== Climate ==
Muara Bungo has a tropical rainforest climate (Af) with heavy rainfall year-round.

Climate data for Muara Bungo
Month	Jan	Feb	Mar	Apr	May	Jun	Jul	Aug	Sep	Oct	Nov	Dec	Year
Mean daily maximum °C (°F)	30.2 (86.4)	30.8 (87.4)	31.2 (88.2)	31.6 (88.9)	31.8 (89.2)	31.5 (88.7)	31.3 (88.3)	31.3 (88.3)	31.2 (88.2)	31.1 (88.0)	31.0 (87.8)	30.4 (86.7)	31.1 (88.0)
Daily mean °C (°F)	26.3 (79.3)	26.6 (79.9)	26.9 (80.4)	27.3 (81.1)	27.3 (81.1)	26.9 (80.4)	26.7 (80.1)	26.7 (80.1)	26.8 (80.2)	26.8 (80.2)	26.8 (80.2)	26.5 (79.7)	26.8 (80.2)
Mean daily minimum °C (°F)	22.4 (72.3)	22.4 (72.3)	22.6 (72.7)	23.0 (73.4)	22.8 (73.0)	22.4 (72.3)	22.1 (71.8)	22.1 (71.8)	22.4 (72.3)	22.5 (72.5)	22.6 (72.7)	22.6 (72.7)	22.5 (72.5)
Average rainfall mm (inches)	359 (14.1)	291 (11.5)	321 (12.6)	360 (14.2)	199 (7.8)	127 (5.0)	148 (5.8)	147 (5.8)	189 (7.4)	231 (9.1)	276 (10.9)	299 (11.8)	2,947 (116)
Source: Climate-Data.org

== Infrastructure ==
=== Transportation ===
The Muara Bungo Airport is located in Muara Bungo, and began operations in November 2012. A roadway connects Muara Bungo with Jambi City and Palembang. In 1977, the Sawahtambang-Muara Bungo highway was under construction.

=== Emergency services ===
Muara Bungo has a fire department that is equipped with fire trucks. The fire department responds to building fires and fires on agricultural and vacant lands. In May 2015, it was reported that fires in Muara Bungo during 2015 had caused Rp $3 billion in losses and damages, which is approximately US$223,957. The damage estimate was mostly attributed to building fires. Muara Bungo also has a police department.

== Business and commerce ==
A branch of Bank Rakyat Indonesia is located in Muara Bungo.

== Land use ==
Natural rubber is produced in Muara Bungo, and rubber farming is a primary source of income and livelihood for the majority of the city's residents. An agroforestry innovation involved the planting of rubber trees and cinnamon alongside one-another to diversify plantings to avoid monoculture. Muara Bungo has some large oil palm plantations, and palm oil is produced there. Circa 1995 to 1996, illegal timber harvesting was observed in Muara Bungo.

== Schools ==
The University of Muara Bungo is located in the city.

== Crime ==
In June 2015, it was reported that street crime rates were increasing in Muara Bungo. Crimes have included mugging (theft by violence), auto theft and robberies. It was reported by Tribun Jambi that a majority of the crimes were committed by outsiders who do not reside in Muara Bungo.
