= Abdullah Sani =

Indonesian politician

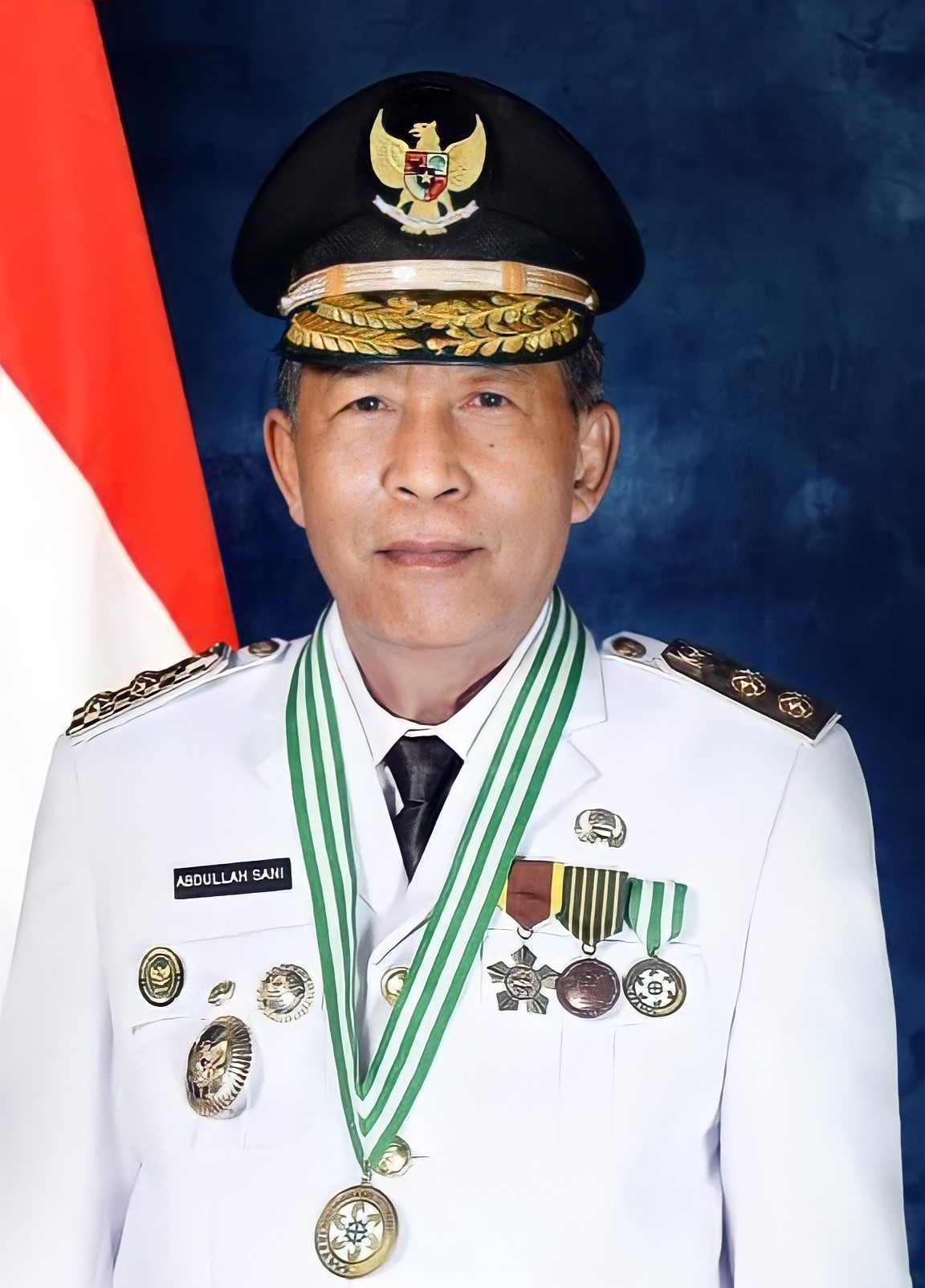

Personal details
- Born: Abdullah Sani; 8 September 1956 (age 69) Bram Itam Kanan, Jambi Residency, Central Sumatra
- Party: PKB (since 2021)
- Other political affiliations: PDI-P (until 2020)
- Occupation: Politician

Abdullah Sani (born 8 September 1956) is an Indonesian politician who was elected to serve as Vice Governor of Jambi for the 2025-2030 period, together with Al Haris as Governor. Sani also served as Deputy Governor of Jambi for the 2021–2024 period, and before that, as Vice Mayor of Jambi for the 2013–2018 period.
