= East Tanjung Jabung Regency =

Regency in Jambi, Indonesia

Coordinates: 1°06′S 104°00′E

East Tanjung Jabung Kabupaten Tanjung Jabung Timur
- Regency
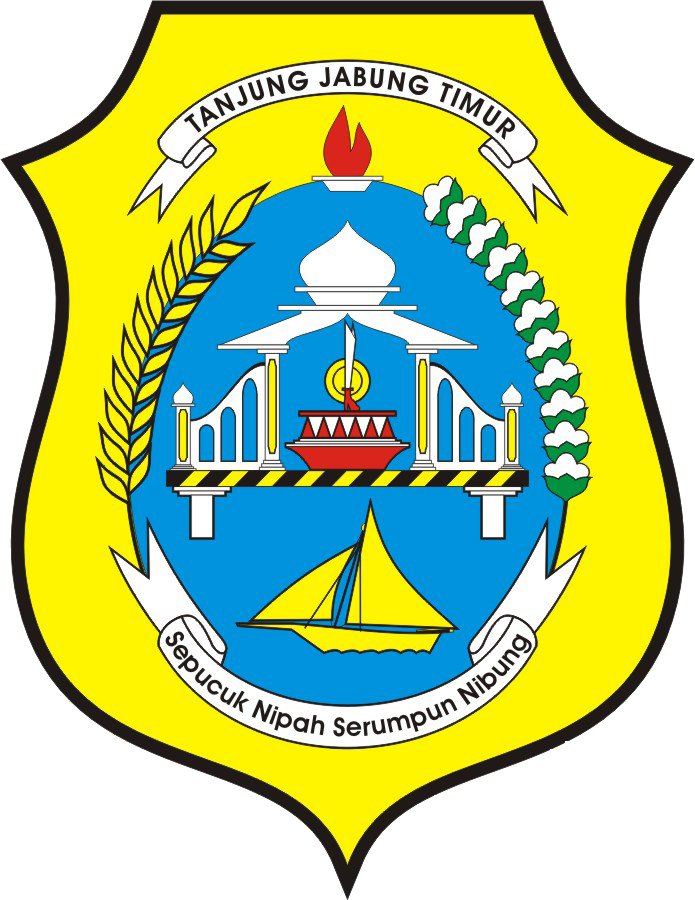
- Coat of arms
- Motto: Sepucuk Nipah Serumpun Nibung (By the same Nipah and the same Nibung)
- Country: Indonesia
- Province: Jambi
- Regency seat: Muara Sabak

Government
  - Regent: Dillah Hikmah Sari
  - Vice Regent: Muslimin Tanja

Area
  - Total: 5,087.07 km^{2} (1,964.13 sq mi)

Population (mid 2025 estimate)
  - Total: 247,537
  - Density: 48.6600/km^{2} (126.029/sq mi)
- Time zone: UTC+7 (WIB)
- Website: tanjabtimkab.go.id

East Tanjung Jabung Regency is a regency of Jambi Province, Indonesia. It is located on the island of Sumatra. The regency was created on 4 October 1999 by the division of the then Tanjung Jabung Regency into eastern and western halves. It now has an area of 5,087.07 km^{2} and had a population of 205,272 at the 2010 census and 229,813 at the 2020 census; the official estimate as of mid 2025 was 247,537 (comprising 126,162 males and 121,375 females). The regency's administrative capital lies at the town of Muara Sabak, a riverine port near the mouth of the Berbak River.

== Administrative districts ==
The regency is divided into eleven districts (kecamatan), tabulated below with their areas and their populations at the 2010 census and the 2020 census. together with the official estimates as of mid 2025. The table also includes the locations of the district administrative centres, the number of administrative villages in each district (totaling 73 rural desa and 20 urban kelurahan), and its post code.

Kode Wilayah	Name of District (kecamatan)	Area in km^{2}	Pop'n 2010 census	Pop'n 2020 census	Pop'n mid 2025 estimate	Admin centre	No. of villages	Post code
15.07.03	Mendahara	538.79	25,581	26,675	27,187	Mendahara Ilir	9	36765
15.07.09	Mendahara Ulu	554.23	14,440	16,676	18,622	Simpang Tuan	7	36766
15.07.10	Geragai	556.30	20,919	26,202	28,813	Pandan Jaya	9	36764
15.07.06	Dendang	381.52	14,895	16,485	17,775	Rantau Indah	7	36763
15.07.07	Muara Sabak Barat (West Muara Sabak)	277.47	15,233	21,409	25,346	Nibung Putih	7	36761
15.07.01	Muara Sabak Timur (East Muara Sabak)	387.94	30,906	32,606	34,407	Muara Sabak Ilir	12	36762
15.07.08	Kuala Jambi	114.95	14,003	14,485	15,050	Kampung Laut	6	36760
15.07.04	Rantau Raseu	177.52	22,078	24,780	26,924	Bandar Jaya	11	36772
15.07.11	Berbak	1,169.17	9,805	10,591	11,052	Simpang	6	36751
15.07.02	Nipah Panjang ^{(a)}	308.32	25,326	26,503	27,913	Nipah Panjang II	10	36771
15.07.05	Sadu	620.85	12,086	13,401	14,448	Sungai Lokan	9	36773
	Totals	5,087.07	205,272	229,813	247,537	Muara Sabak	93	

Note: (a) includes the estuary of the Batang Hari River and 7 offshore islands in the mouth of that river.

The 20 kelurahan comprise all 7 in Muara Sabak Barat District (Kampung Singkep, Nibung Putih, Parit Culum I, Parit Culum II, Rano, Talang Babat and Telukdawan), 2 in Muara Sabak Timur District (Muara Sabak Ilir and Muara Sabak Ulu), 2 in Kuala Jambi District (Kampung Laut and Tanjung Solok), 2 in Nipah Panjang District (Nipah Panjang I and Nipah Panjang II), and 1 in each of the other 7 districts.
