= Sarolangun Regency =

Regency in Jambi, Indonesia

Coordinates: 2.3000°S 102.6500°E

Sarolangun Regency Kabupaten Sarolangun
- Regency
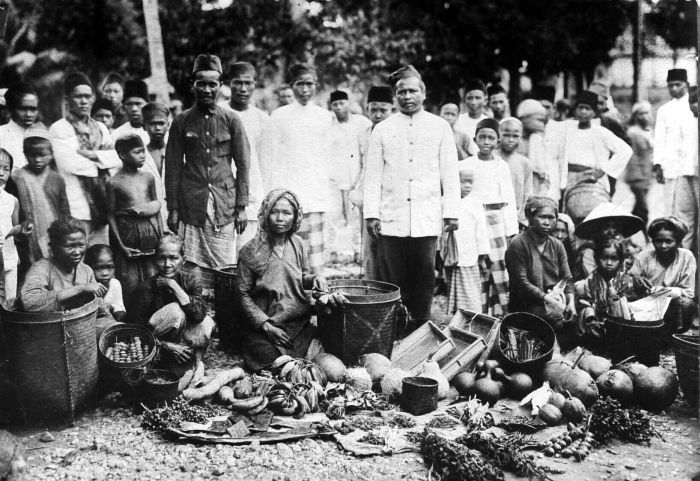
- Fruit market in Sarolangun

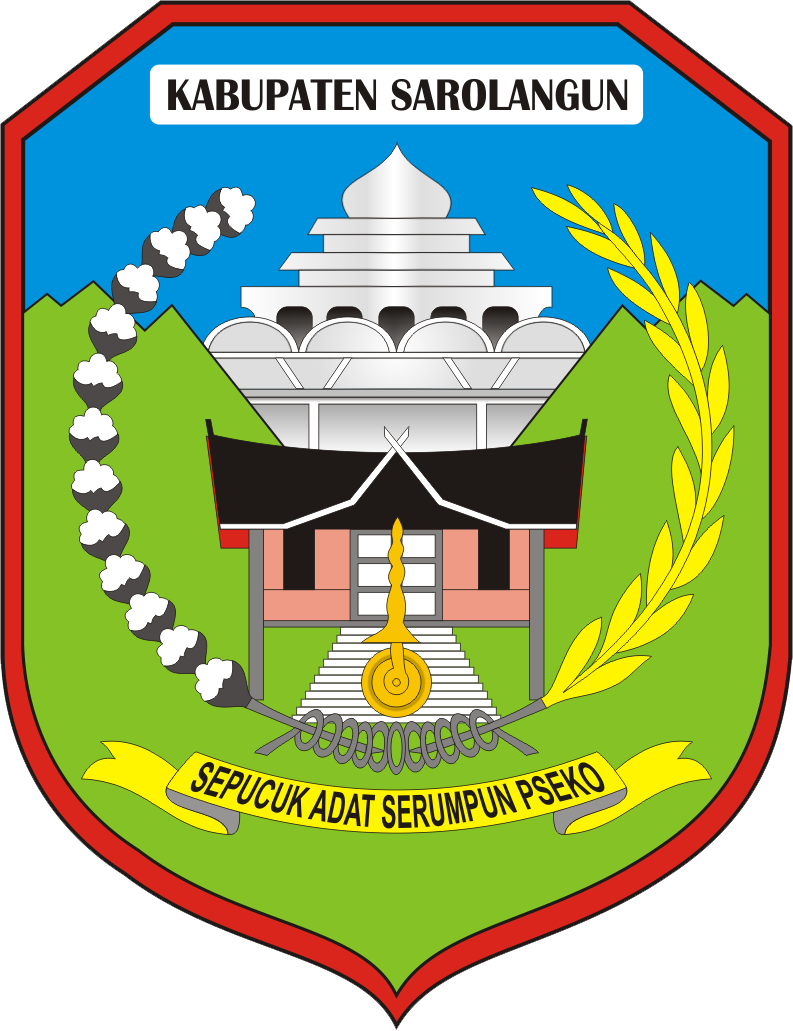
- Coat of arms
- Motto: Sepucuk Adat Serumpun Pseko (One custom, one heirloom)
- Country: Indonesia
- Province: Jambi
- Regency seat: Sarolangun

Government
  - Regent: Hurmin
  - Vice Regent: Gerry Trisatwika

Area
  - Total: 5,935.89 km^{2} (2,291.86 sq mi)

Population (mid 2025 estimate)
  - Total: 310,679
  - Density: 52.3391/km^{2} (135.558/sq mi)
- Time zone: UTC+7 (WIB)
- Website: sarolangunkab.go.id

Sarolangun Regency is a regency of Jambi Province, Indonesia. It is located on the island of Sumatra. It was created on 4 October 1999 by the division of the former Sarolangun Bangko Regency into a new Merangin Regency and this Sarolangun Regency. The regency has an area of 5,935.89 km^{2} and had a population of 246,245 at the 2010 census and 290,047 at the 2020 census; the official estimate as at mid 2025 was 310,679 (comprising 158,026 males and 152,653 females). The administrative centre is at the town of Sarolangun.

== Administrative districts ==
At the 2020 Census, Sarolangun Regency comprised ten districts (kecamatan), but in 2022 a new Mandiangin Timur (East Mandiangin) District was created from the eastern part of Mandiangin District. The eleven districts are tabulated below with their areas and their populations at the 2010 census and 2020 census, together with the official estimates as at mid 2025. The table also includes the locations of the district administrative centres, the number of administrative villages in each district (a total of 149 rural desa and 16 urban kelurahan), and its post code.

Kode Wilayah	Name of District (kecamatan)	Area in km^{2}	Pop'n 2010 census	Pop'n 2020 census	Pop'n mid 2025 estimate	Admin centre	No. of villages	Post code
15.03.01	Batang Asai	991.61	16,036	18,705	19,929	Pekan Gedang	23	37485
15.03.02	Limun	724.86	15,343	18,118	19,419	Pulau Pandan	16	37382
15.03.10	Cermin Nan Gedang	405.87	10,858	13,474	14,792	Lubuk Resam	10	37381
15.03.05	Pelawan	353.88	28,138	34,224	37,210	Pelawan	14	37482
15.03.09	Singkut	190.74	36,184	40,198	41,830	Sungai Benteng	13 ^{(a)}	37483
15.03.03	(Kota) Sarolangun (town district)	284.33	46,098	56,900	62,307	Sarolangun	23 ^{(b)}	37481
15.03.08	Bathin VIII	327.94	18,031	21,155	22,603	Limbur Tembesi	15 ^{(a)}	37480
15.03.04	Pauh	776.04	20,566	24,132	25,785	Pauh	14 ^{(a)}	37491
15.03.07	Air Hitam	636,76	23,757	26,011	26,877	Jernih	9	37490
15.03.06	Mandiangin	762.32	31,234	37,130	25,737	Mandiangin	18	37492
15.03.11	Mandiangin Timur (East Mandiangin)	479.54	^{(c)}	^{(c)}	14,190	Butang Baru	10	37492
	Totals	5,935.89	246,245	290,047	310,679	Sarolangun	165	

Notes: (a) includes one kelurahan (the admin centre). (b) comprises thirteen kelurahan (Aur Gading I, Aur Gading II, Simpang Raya Luar, Simpang Raya Dalam, Dusun Sarolangun, Gunung Kembang, Tanjung Rambai, Pasar Atas Sarolangun, Pasar Bawah Sarolangun, Sarolangun Kembang, Sri Pelayang Ilir, Sukasari I and Sukasari II) and ten desa.
(c) the 2010 and 2020 figures for the new Mandiangin Timur District are included in the totals for Mandiangin District, from which it was cut out in 2022.
