= West Tanjung Jabung Regency =

Regency in Jambi, Indonesia

Coordinates: 1°03′00″S 102°55′59″E

West Tanjung Jabung Kabupaten Tanjung Jabung Barat
- Regency
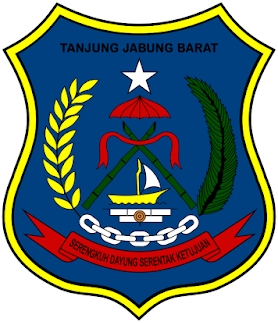
- Coat of arms
- Motto: Serengkuh Dayung Serentak Ketujuan (Rowing together for the aim)
- Country: Indonesia
- Province: Jambi
- Regency seat: Kuala Tungkal

Government
  - Regent: Anwar Sadat
  - Vice Regent: Katamso Syafei Ahmad

Area
  - Total: 5,544.57 km^{2} (2,140.77 sq mi)

Population (mid 2025 estimate)
  - Total: 344,033
  - Density: 62.0486/km^{2} (160.705/sq mi)
- Time zone: UTC+7 (WIB)
- Website: tanjabbarkab.go.id

West Tanjung Jabung Regency (Kabupaten Tanjung Jabung Barat) is a regency of Jambi Province, Indonesia. It is located on the island of Sumatra. The regency was created on 4 October 1999 by the division of the then Tanjung Jabung Regency into eastern and western halves. The western regency now has an area of 5,544.57 km^{2} and had a population of 278,741 as at the 2010 census and 317,498 at the 2020 census; the official estimate as at mid 2025 was 344,033 (comprising 177,164 males and 166,869 females). The regency seat is the town of Kuala Tungkal, a port at the mouth of the Tungkal River.

== Administrative districts ==
The regency is divided into thirteen districts (kecamatan), tabulated below with their areas and their populations at the 2010 census and the 2020 census, together with the official estimates as at mid 2025. The table also includes the locations of the district administrative centres, and the number of villages in each district (totaling 114 rural desa and 20 urban kelurahan - the latter comprising 8 in Tungkal Ilir District, and one in each of the other 12 districts), and its post code.

Kode Wilayah	Name of District (kecamatan)	Area in km^{2}	Pop'n 2010 census	Pop'n 2020 census	Pop'n mid 2025 estimate	Admin centre	No. of villages	Post code
15.06.01	Tungkal Ulu	345.69	12,586	14,520	15,669	Pelabuhan Dagang	10	36552
15.06.05	Merlung	311.65	15,302	16,196	17,152	Merlung	10	36554
15.06.07	Batang Asam	1,042.37	23,728	32,423	38,024	Dusun Kebun	11	36550
15.06.06	Tebing Tinggi	342.89	34,164	36,228	37,508	Tebing Tinggi	10	36551
15.06.08	Renau Mendaluh	473.72	11,828	15,166	18,010	Lubuk Kambing	10	36559
15.06.09	Muara Papalik	336.38	10,307	10,831	11,050	Rantau Badak	10	36558
15.06.03	Pengabuan	440.13	23,404	25,514	26,895	Teluk Nilau	13	36553
15.06.13	Senyerang	426.63	22,393	24,249	26,116	Senyerang	10	36513
15.06.02	Tungkal Ilir	100.31	67,817	72,795	76,530	Kuala Tungkal	10 ^{(a)}	36557
15.06.11	Bram Itam	312.66	14,730	18,345	19,944	Bram Itam Kiri	10	36514
15.06.10	Seberang Kota	121.29	8,203	8,824	9,298	Tungkal V	8	36511
15.06.04	Betara	570.21	23,904	29,180	33,423	Mekar Jaya	12	36555
15.06.12	Kuala Betara	185.89	10.375	13,227	14,414	Betara Kiri	10	36556
	Totals	5,544.57	278,741	317,498	344,033	Kuala Tungkal	134	

Note: (a) comprises 8 kelurahan (Kampung Nelayan, Patunas, Sriwijaya, Sungai Nibung, Tungkal II, Tungkal III, Tungkal IV Kota and Tungkal Harapan) and 2 desa.
