= Bungo Regency =

Regency in Jambi, Indonesia

Coordinates: 1°30′8″S 101°57′36″E

Bungo Regency Kabupaten Bungo
- Regency
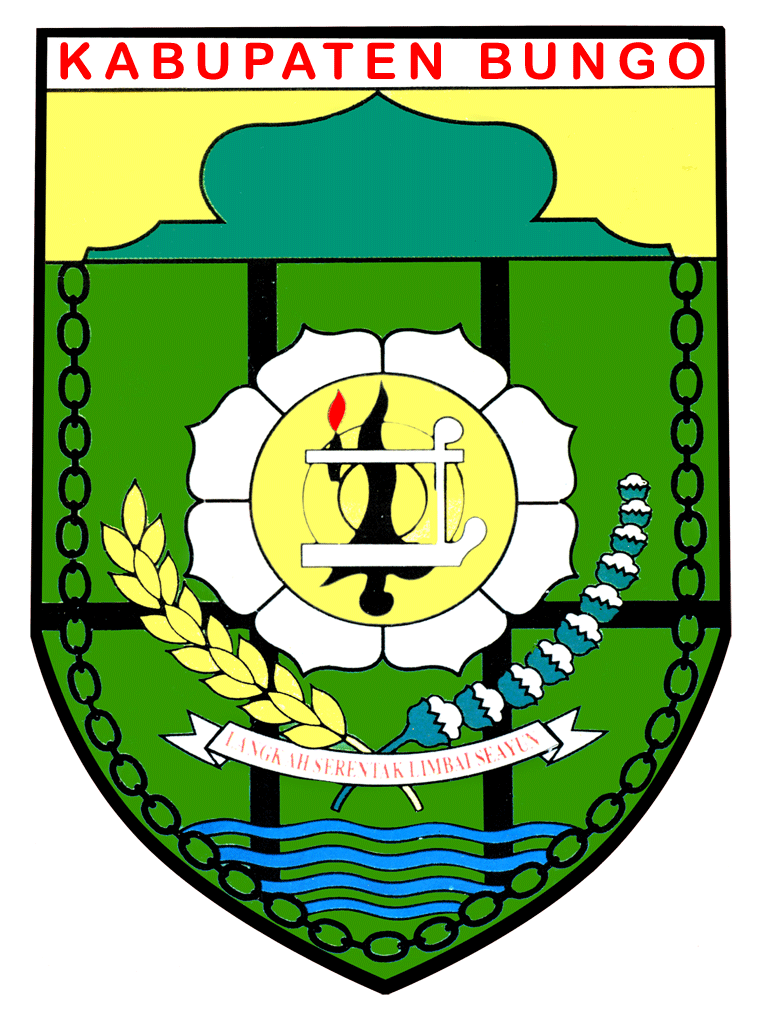
- Coat of arms
- Motto: Langkah Serentak Limbah Seayun (Stepping together, swaying together)
- Country: Indonesia
- Province: Jambi
- Regency seat: Muara Bungo

Government
  - Regent: Dedy Putra
  - Vice Regent: Tri Wahyu Hidayat

Area
  - Total: 4,659.00 km^{2} (1,798.85 sq mi)

Population (mid 2025 estimate)
  - Total: 386,114
  - Density: 82.8749/km^{2} (214.645/sq mi)
- Time zone: UTC+7
- Website: bungokab.go.id

Bungo Regency is a regency (kabupaten) of Jambi Province in Sumatra, Indonesia. It was created on 4 October 1999 by the division of the former Bungo Tebo Regency into a new Tebo Regency in the east and this Bungo Regency in the west. The Bungo Regency covers an area of 4,659 km^{2}. As of the 2010 census, the regency had a population of 303,135 and 362,363 at the 2020 census; the official estimate as of mid 2025 was 386,114 (comprising 196,287 males and 189,827 females). The administrative capital is the town of Muara Bungo.

== Administrative districts ==
Bungo Regency is subdivided into seventeen districts (kecamatan), listed below with their areas and their populations at the 2010 census and the 2020 census, together with the official estimates as of mid 2025. The table also includes the locations of the district administrative centres, the number of villages in each district (a total of 141 rural desa and 12 urban kelurahan), and its post code.

Kode Wilayah	Name of District (kecamatan)	Area in km^{2}	Pop'n census 2010	Pop'n census 2020	Pop'n estimate mid 2025	Admin centre	No. of villages	Post code
15.08.06	Pelepat	1,069.07	27,718	35,260	38,363	Rantau Keloyang	15	37262
15.08.09	Pelepat Ilir	410.29	44,479	51,212	53,094	Kuamang Jaya	17	37252
15.08.10	Bathin II Babeko	176.29	10,533	14,268	16,003	Simpang Babeko	6	37210
15.08.13	Rimbo Tengah	96.90	23,760	32,764	37,066	Cadika	4 ^{(a)}	37215
15.08.12	Bungo Dani	35.97	23,208	27,436	28,810	Talang Pantai	5 ^{(b)}	37212
15.08.03	Pasar Muara Bungo	9.21	22,266	21,243	21,814	Bungo Timur	5 ^{(c)}	37214
15.08.11	Bathin III	80.46	18,714	26,200	29,858	Manggis	8 ^{(d)}	37211
15.08.02	Rantau Pandan	239.61	9,361	10,631	10,949	Rantau Pandan	6	37261
15.08.08	Muko-Muko Bathin VII	186.73	13,386	15,412	15,978	Tanjung Agung	9	37216
15.08.14	Bathin III Ulu	373.83	7,833	9,609	10,272	Muara Buat	9	37260
15.08.05	Tanah Sepenggal	106.92	20,580	24,376	25,620	Pasar Lubuk Landai	10	37263
15.08.17	Tanah Sepenggal Lintas	77.51	21,201	23,659	24,160	Ambacang Gedang	12	37264
15.08.01	Tanah Tumbuh	236.55	13,268	15,140	15,628	Tanah Tumbuh	11	37255
15.08.07	Limbur Lubuk Mengkuang	932.41	14,036	16,713	17,611	Tuo Limbur	14	37213
15.08.15	Bathin II Pelayang	179.84	8,420	9,042	9,322	Pelayang	5	37254
15.08.04	Jujuhan	254.12	14,656	19,112	21,045	Rantau Ikil	10	37256
15.08.16	Jujuhan Ilir	193.04	9,716	10,286	10,521	Pulau Batu	7	37257
	Total Regency	4,659.00	303,135	362,363	386,114	Muara Bungo	153	

Notes: (a) including 2 kelurahan - Cadika and Pasir Putih. (b) including 2 kelurahan - Sungai Kerjan and Sungai Pinang.
(c) all 5 are kelurahan - Batang Bungo, Bungo Barat, Bungo Timur, Jaya Setia and Tanjung Gedang.
(d) including 3 kelurahan - Bungo Taman Agung, Manggis and Sungai Binjai.

== Muara Bungo Airport ==
Muara Bungo Airport with a 1,350 metre runway has flight routes to Jakarta, Jambi, and Bengkulu.
