= Merangin Regency =

Regency in Jambi, Indonesia

Coordinates: 2°12′10″S 102°03′14″E

Merangin Regency Kabupaten Merangin
- Regency
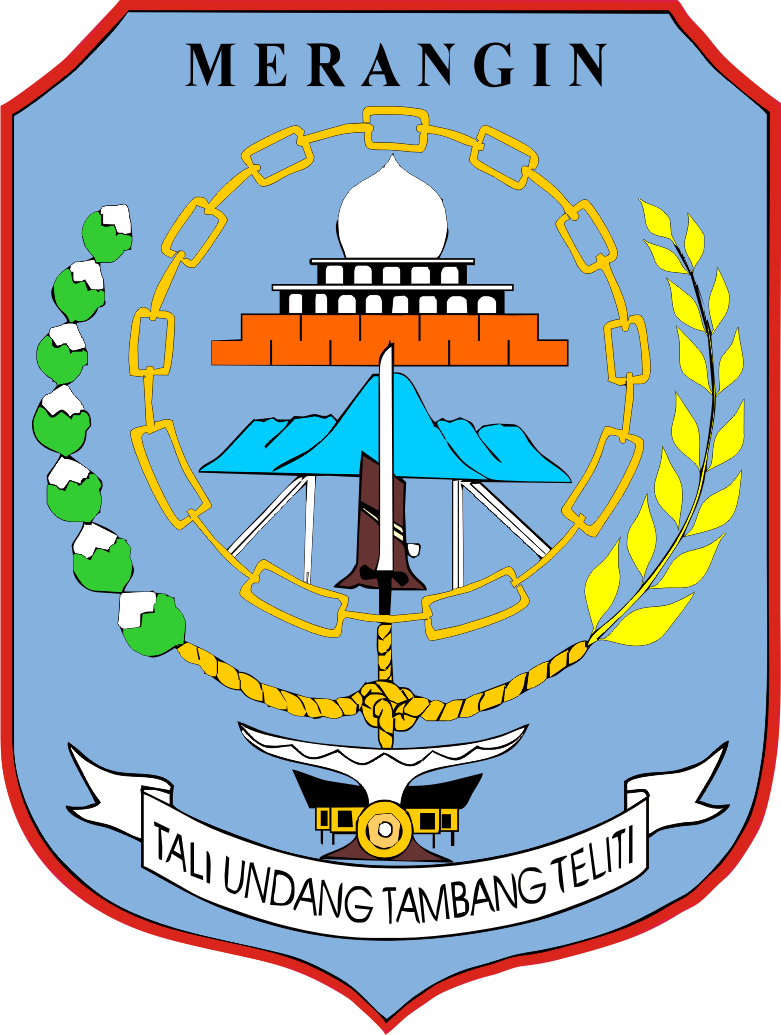
- Coat of arms
- Motto(s): Tali Undang Tambang Teliti (Strap of Penghulu tribe and rope of Batin tribe; another meaning: tie in the rules, explore carefully)
- Country: Indonesia
- Province: Jambi
- Regency seat: Bangko

Government
  - Regent: Muhammad Syukur
  - Vice Regent: Abdul Khafidh

Area
  - Total: 7,544.24 km^{2} (2,912.85 sq mi)

Population (mid 2025 estimate)
  - Total: 378,357
  - Density: 50.1518/km^{2} (129.892/sq mi)
- Time zone: UTC+7 (WIB)
- Website: meranginkab.go.id

Merangin Regency is a regency (kabupaten) of Jambi Province on the island of Sumatra, Indonesia. It was created on 4 October 1999 by the division of the former Sarolangun Bangko Regency into a new Sarolangun Regency in the east and this Merangin Regency in the west. The regency covers an area of 7,544.24 km^{2}, and had a population of 333,206 at the 2010 census and 354,052 at the 2020 census; the official estimate as of mid 2025 was 378,357 (comprising 189,365 males and 184,044 females in 2024). The administrative capital is the town of Bangko.

== Borders ==
Geographically, Merangin Regency lies between 101032’39” – 102038’35” east longitude, and 1039’23” – 2046’9” south longitude. Merangin Regency borders on Bungo Regency on the north side, Tebo Regency to the northeast, Sarolangun Regency on the east side, Lebong Regency (in Bengkulu Province) on the south side and Kerinci Regency on the west side.

== Administrative districts ==
Merangin Regency is divided into twenty-four districts (kecamatan), tabulated below with their areas and their populations at the 2010 census and the 2020 census, together with the official estimates as of mid 2025. For ease of reference, these are grouped into three geographical sectors, which have no administrative significance. The table also includes the locations of the district administrative centres, the number of administrative villages in each district (totaling 205 rural desa and 10 urban kelurahan), and its post code.

Kode Wilayah	Name of District (kecamatan)	Area in km^{2}	Pop'n 2010 Census	Pop'n 2020 Census	Pop'n mid 2025 Estimate	Admin centre	No. of villages	Post code
15.02.01	Jangkat	951.54	8,932	9,712	9,912	Muara Madras	11	37372
15.02.18	Sungai Tenang (Jangkat Timur)	649.48	9,005	9,409	9,856	Rantau Suli	14	37374
15.02.03	Muara Siau	631.36	9,327	10,063	10,706	Pasar Muara Siau	17	37370
15.02.09	Lembah Masurai	672.90	19,522	13,875	14,661	Pasar Masurai	15	37373
15.02.24	Tiang Pumpung	290.42	4,586	4,684	4,853	Sekancing	6	37371
15.02.06	Pamenang	329.92	30,362	33,476	35,990	Pamenang	14 ^{(a)}	37352
15.02.13	Pamenang Barat (West Pamenang)	188.38	15,737	17,294	18,563	Simpang; Limbur Merangin	8	37318
15.02.19	Renah Pamenang	93.65	13,439	14,416	15,294	Meranti	4	37351
Sub-totals	Southern sector	3,807.65	110,910	112,929	119,835		89	
15.02.20	Pamenang Selatan (South Pamenang)	152.18	9,612	10,430	11,127	Tambang Emas	4	37319
15.02.02	Bangko	166.17	45,557	48,857	51,824	Pasar Atas Bangko	8 ^{(b)}	37311: 37314
15.02.10	Bangko Barat (West Bangko)	192.08	10,607	10,985	11,457	Pulau Rengas Ulu	6	37315
15.02.11	Nalo Tantan	101.65	11,674	16,988	20,491	Lubuk Gaung	7	37317
15.02.12	Batang Masumai	194.42	9,563	10,702	11,589	Sungai Ulak	10	37316
15.02.04	Sungai Manau	279.79	9,577	10,216	10,809	Sungai Manau	10	37363
15.02.16	Renah Pembarap	93.65	11,623	12,987	14,053	Simpang Parit	12	37362
15.02.17	Pangkalan Jambu	403.52	6,142	6,409	6,709	Sungai Jering	8	37361
Sub-totals	Eastern sector	1,583.66	114,35	127,574	138,059		65	
15.02.05	Tabir	350.50	27,602	28,594	29,828	Pasar Rantau Panjang	11 ^{(c)}	37350
15.02.07	Tabir Ulu	208.75	8,411	8,144	8,377	Muara Jernih	6	37356
15.02.08	Tabir Selatan (South Tabir)	191.73	26,397	29,313	31,623	Rawa Jaya	8	37354
15.02.14	Tabir Ilir	183.29	9,623	8,861	9,110	Rantau Limau Manis	7	37358
15.02.15	Tabir Timur (East Tabit)	93.74	7,381	7,908	8,385	Sungai Bulian	4	37355
15.02.22	Tabir Lintas	113.26	7,375	8,112	8,711	Mensango	5	37357
15.02.21	Margo Tabir	120.94	12,941	13,604	14,292	Tanjung Rejo	6	37359
15.02.23	Tabir Barat (West Tabir)	733.28	8,211	9,305	10,137	Muara Kibul	14	37353
Sub-totals	Northern sector	1,995.49	107,941	113,841	120,463		61	
	Totals for Regency	7,544.24	333,206	354,052	378,357	Bangko	215	

Notes: (a) including one kelurahan - the town of Pamenang, with 7,376 inhabitants in mid 2022.
(b) comprising 4 kelurahan (with populations in mid 2022) - Dusun Bangko (12,968), Pasar Bangko (2,338), Pasar Atas Bangko (5,884) and Pematang Kandis (16,624) - plus 4 desa.
(c) comprising 5 kelurahan (with populations in mid 2022) - Dusun Baru (7,320), Mampun (4,122), Kampung Baruh (3,901), Pasar Baru Rantau (2,572) and Pasar Rantau Panjang (4,511) - plus 6 desa.

However, the last-mentioned eight districts, comprising the northern 26.45% of Merangin Regency, are planned to be separated out to form a new Regency - Kabupaten Tabir Raya; these eight districts cover 1,995.49 km^{2} and had an estimated combined population of 113,841 at the 2020 census, rising to an estimated 120,463 in mid 2025. However, the implementation of this scheme is delayed due to the moratorium (since 2013) by the Indonesian Government on the creation of new regencies and cities.

== Merangin Geopark ==
Merangin Geopark has been proposed to UNESCO to be a World's Heritage Merangin Geopark and a UNESCO team has visited Merangin Geopark. The Geopark has a Araucarioxylon fossil tree complete with the root of 300 million years, the oldest in Asia. Today the ancient Merangin River is usually used for white water sports.
