= Al-Falah Great Mosque, Jambi =

Mosque in Jambi (city), Jambi, Indonesia

Coordinates: 1°35′39″S 103°36′30″E

Great Mosque Al-Falah
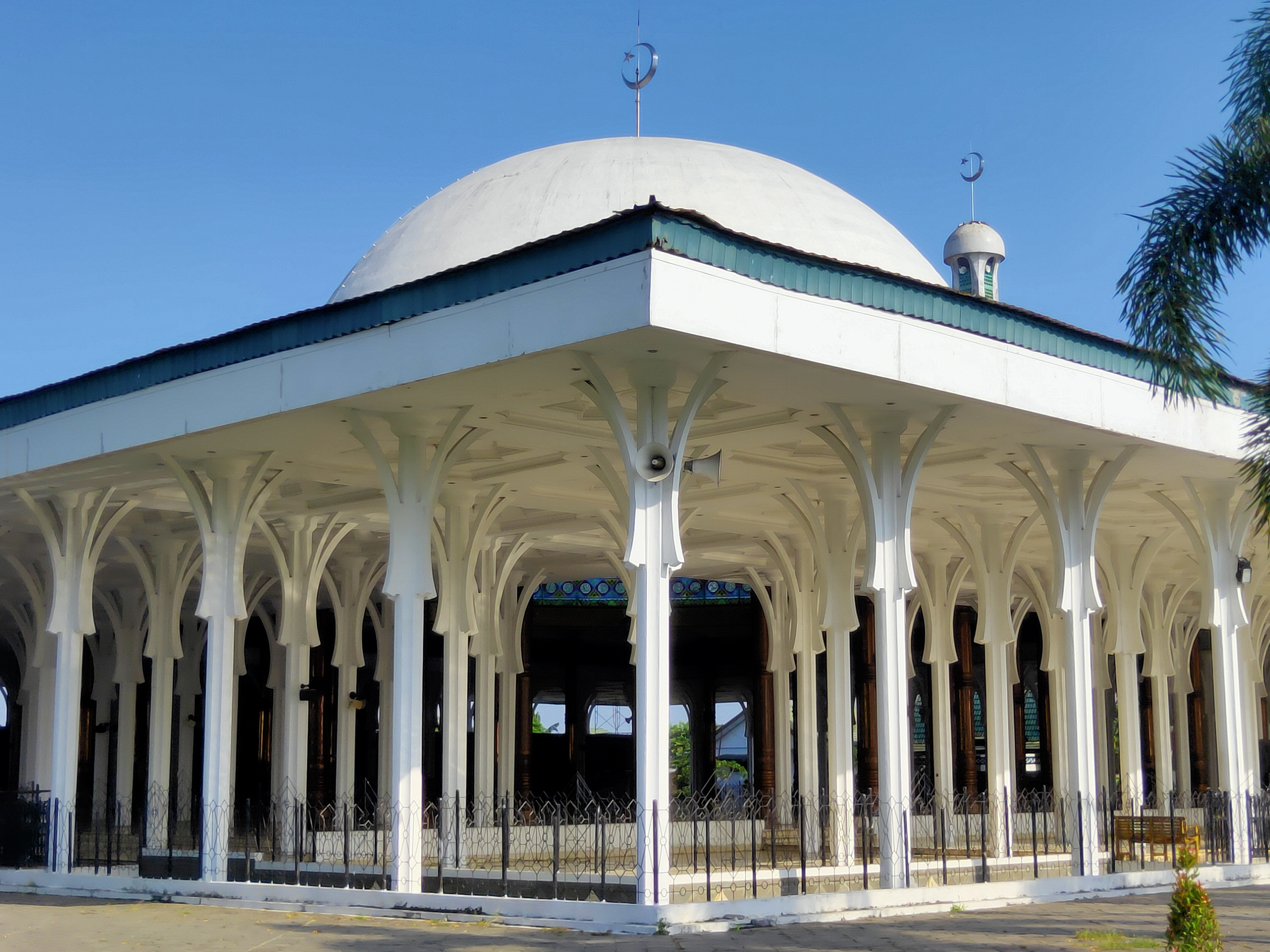

Religion
- Affiliation: Islam

Location
- Location: Jambi (city), Indonesia
- Interactive map of Great Mosque Al-Falah

Architecture
- Type: Mosque
- Groundbreaking: 1971
- Completed: 1980

Al-Falah Great Mosque is the largest mosque in Jambi (city), Indonesia. This mosque is also known as the "Mosque of 1000 pillars," though it has only 232 pillars. Construction of the mosque began in 1971 and ended in 1980.

== History ==
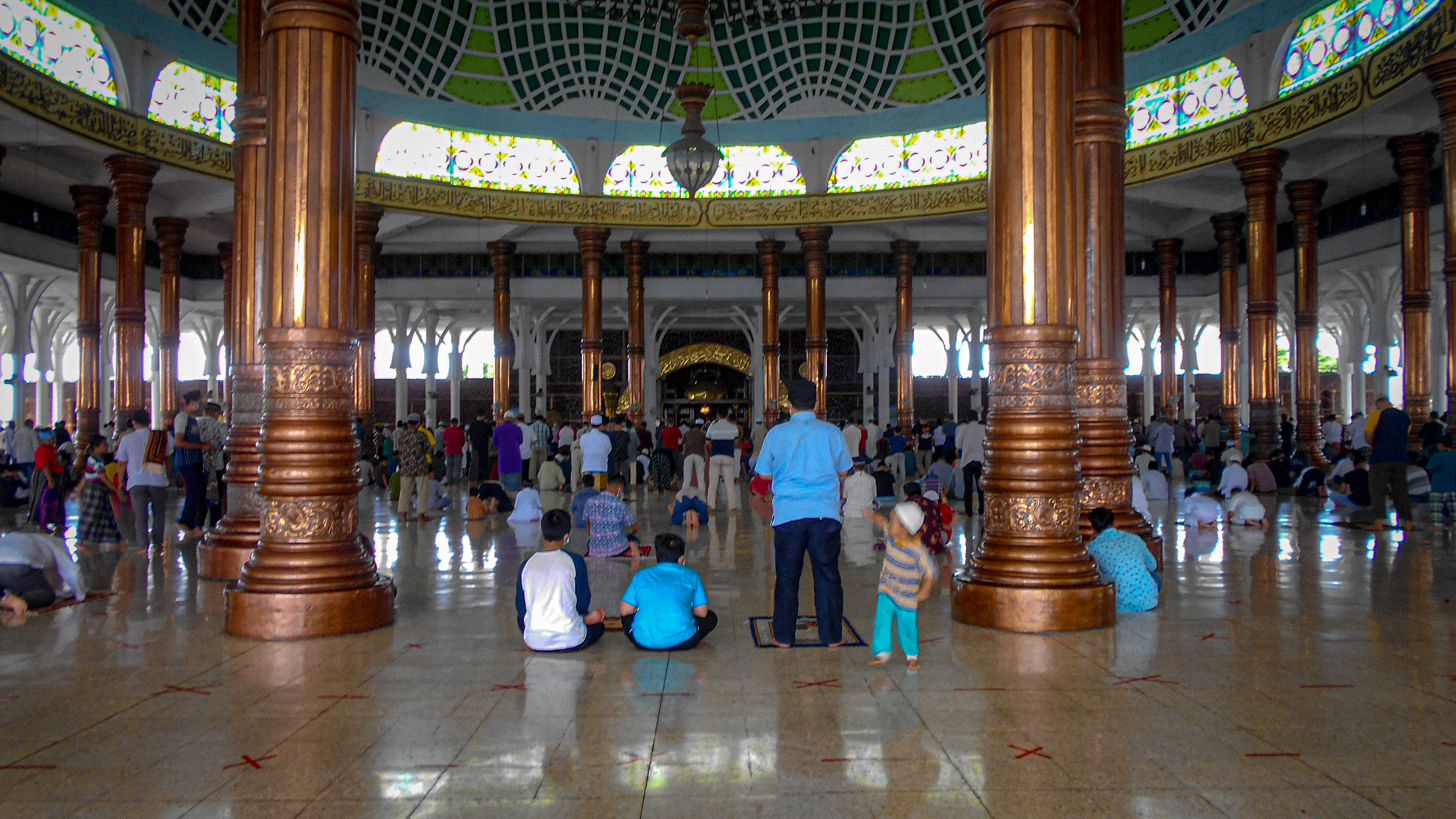
Friday prayers at the mosque

Al-Falah Mosque stands on ground once occupied by the palace of the Jambi Sultanate. In the 1850s, during skirmishes between Sultan Thaha Syaifudin and Dutch troops, the palace complex was burned to the ground. In 1885, the area where the palace stood was the site of a Dutch fort. In 1906, this land was then used for Dutch military barracks. After independence and into the 1970s, the area continued to be used for barracks for the Indonesian National Armed Forces in Jambi.

The idea of constructing Al-Falah Mosque began in the 1960s through conversations between Jambi government officials and prominent figures in the local Muslim community, who eventually agreed to relocate the barracks and build the mosque in its place. Construction of the mosque did not begin until 1971. The Al-Falah Great Mosque of Jambi was inaugurated for use by President Suharto on 29 September 1980.

== Architecture ==
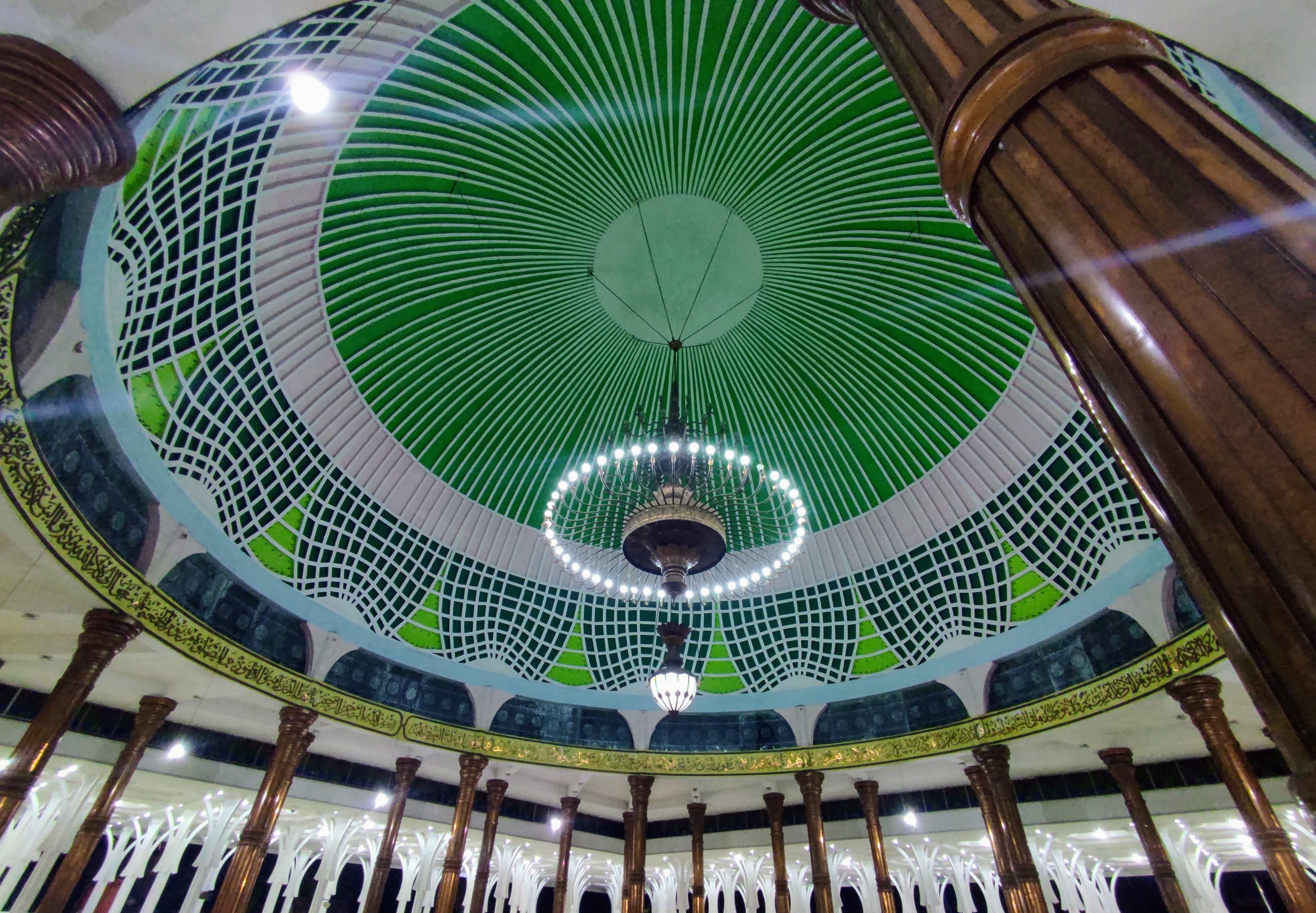
The interior of the mosque's dome

Al-Falah Mosque's grounds cover more than 26,890 square meters, or more than 2.7 hectares. The mosque itself covers 6,400 square meters, measuring 80 meters long by 80 meters wide. It can accommodate 10,000 worshipers. While there have been some renovations, the overall structure of the mosque has not changed since its construction.

The mosque is built in the style of an open pendopo, with many pillars supporting a single, large dome. It is constructed from reinforced concrete. There are two types of pillars present in the mosque: white pillars around the outer edges of the mosque and pillars wrapped in copper that support the central dome.

The mosque was designed as an open building without doors or windows. The interior of the dome is decorated with symmetrical, ornamental lines that resemble latitude and longitude lines on a globe. A ring around the base of the dome is decorated with calligraphy from the Quran written in gold. A large chandelier hangs below the dome.

== See also ==
- List of mosques in Indonesia
