= Ma'had Ubay bin Kaab =

Sunni Islamic boarding school

Ubay bin Kaab Islamic Boarding School
- Pondok Pesantren Ubay bin Kaab
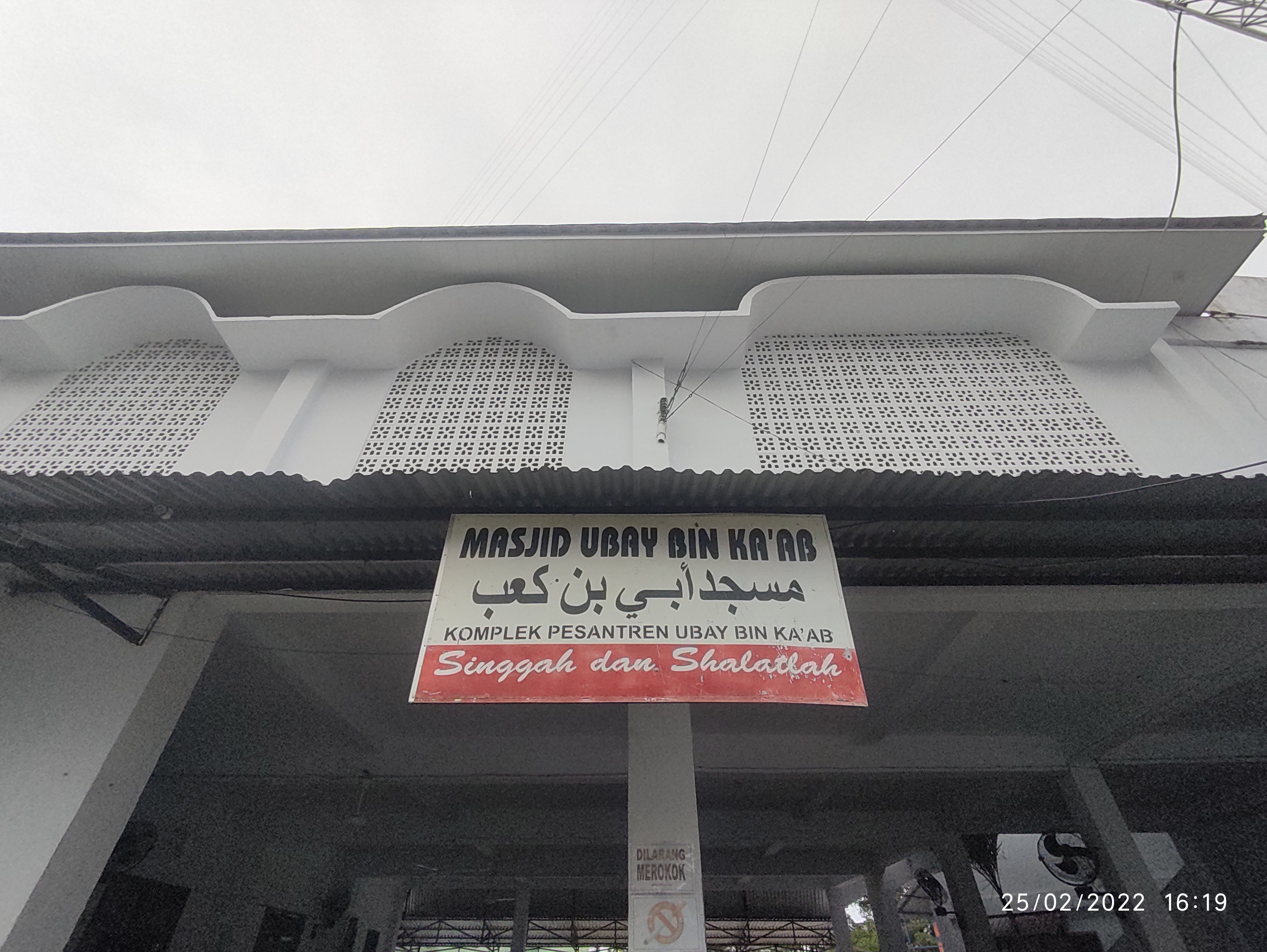
- Ubay bin Kaab Jambi mosque plaque

Religion
- Affiliation: Islamism
- District: Jambi City
- Province: Jambi
- Region: Telanaipura
- Ownership: Abu Salma

Location
- Location: Street Golf II, Pematang Sulur, Telanaipura
- Country: Indonesia
- Interactive map of Ubay bin Kaab Islamic Boarding School
- Coordinates: 1.607254°S 103.567680°E

Architecture
- Completed: 2009

Website
- https://ppdbubay.com

Ma'had Ubay bin Kaab is a Sunni Islamic boarding school located in Jambi City, Jambi Province, Indonesia. More precisely located on Jl. Golf II, Pematang Sulur, Telanaipura, Jambi City. This Islamic boarding school was founded by Ustaz Abu Salma, Lc. in 2009 under the auspices of the Imam Bukhari Al-Atsari Foundation which is one of the institutions that spreads Salafi preaching in Jambi province.

Ubay Bin Ka'ab Islamic Boarding School stands on 3702 m^{2} of land located in the center of Jambi city so it is easily accessible by public and private vehicles. The practice and implementation of religious moderation at Mahad Ubay Bin Ka'ab in daily life implements religious tolerance and applies a generous nature towards fellow religious people. Respecting differences in both religious and other aspects of life, and creating a brilliant generation with broad insight and creating a harmonious nation.

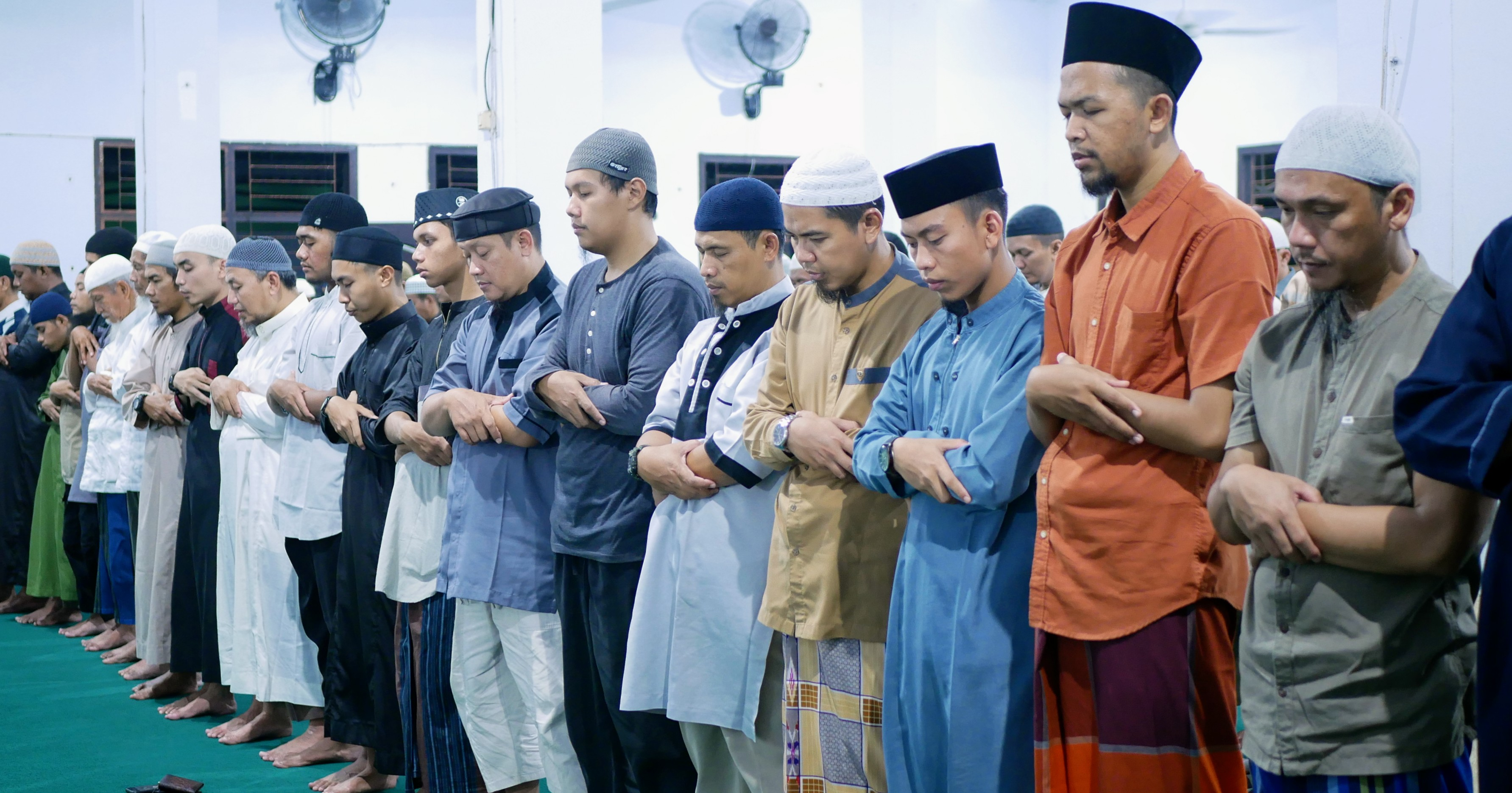
Tarawih Prayer Activities in the Month of Ramadan in 1444 H at the Ubay bin Kaab Mosque in Jambi

The cost of construction, dormitory, food, and education costs at this Islamic boarding school are free, only an administration fee of Rp. 100,000/month or Rp. 600,000/semester is charged for those taking the bachelor's degree program. The facilities of this Islamic boarding school consist of: study rooms, dormitories, places of worship mosque, canteen and sports field.

This Islamic boarding school was built by Ustaz Abu Salma, Lc. who was a direct student of Buya Djefri Efendi Wahab, in the same class as Ustaz Maududi Abdullah in the 4th generation of the Al-Furqon Islamic boarding school in Pekanbaru, he also studied at the Islamic University of Medina in 1997 and graduated in 2002. The media that often broadcast study activities at this Islamic boarding school are Izzah TV and Radio Salam Jambi 105.1 FM.

The curriculum applied at the Ubay bin Kaab Islamic boarding school is the Salafiah Islamic boarding school curriculum, the graduates of which are expected to be able to become community figures who have memorized the Qur'an and are competent in the field of religious knowledge. Ubay bin Ka'ab Islamic Boarding School graduated many students. Even some of them are currently continuing their education at the Islamic University of Medina, LIPIA, STDI Imam Syafi'i Jember, as well as Islamic education in other places.

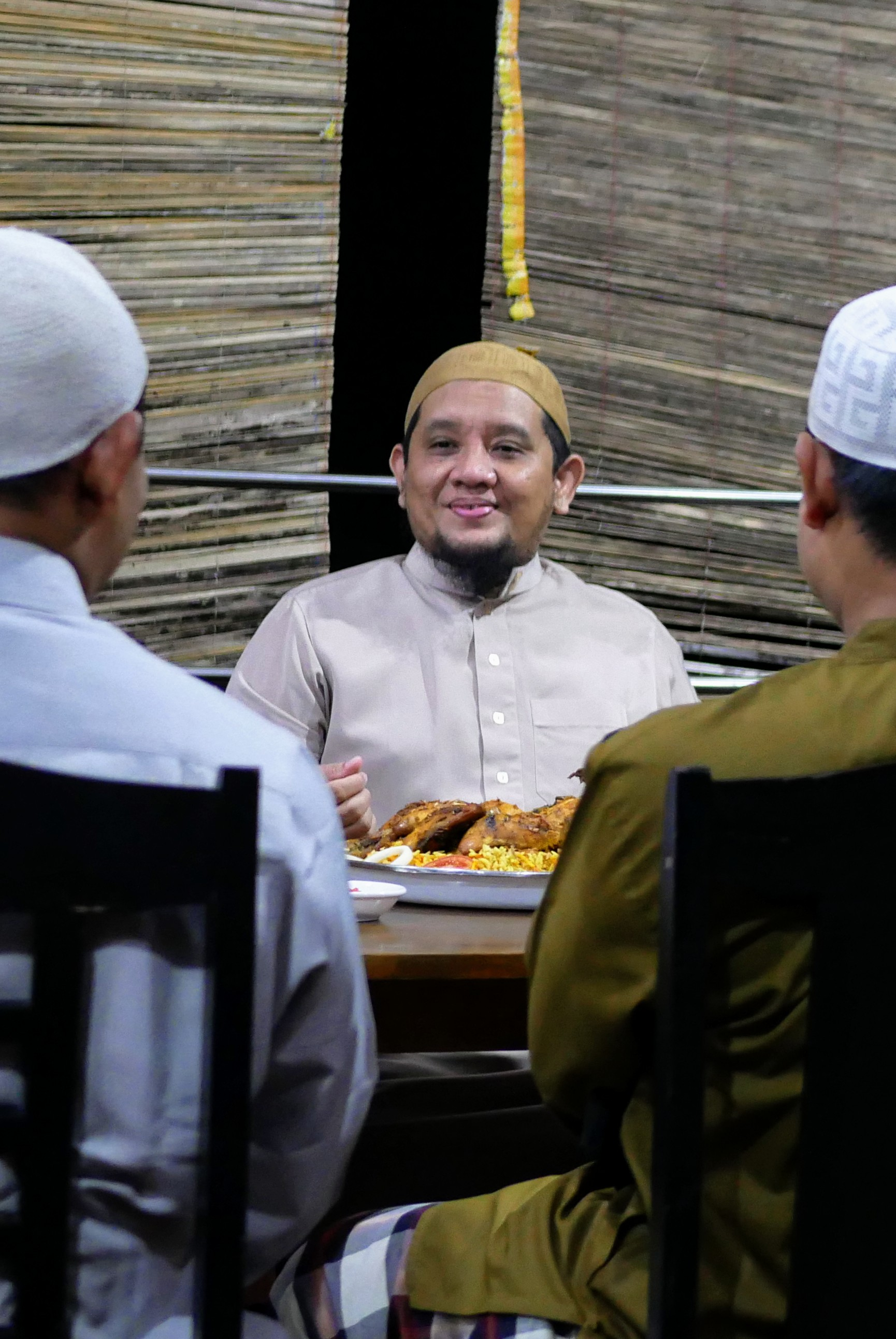
Ustaz Abu Salma, Lc. founder of the Ubay bin Kaab Islamic Boarding School

== Education programs ==
- Boys and girls (boarding mandatory)
- 4 year education period (obtain a formal bachelor's degree)
- Memorizing the Qur'an
- Memorizing the Hadiths
- Memorizing the lessons of knowledge
- Active Arabic speaker
- Studying religious knowledge such as: Tawhid, Fiqh, Tafsir, etc.

== History Journey ==
Initially, the Imam Bukhari Al-Atsari Foundation was established first with Notarial Deed Jon Astra number 09 on November 26, 2008, and ratification by the Minister of Law and Human Rights of the Republic of Indonesia. In the same year, the founder of the foundation tried to open registration for new students, but no students registered at all.

In 2009, registration for new students was finally opened again and there were 6 students registered, and in August, teaching and learning activities began at this Islamic boarding school with the existing conditions.

In 2011, regular studies were held every Sunday, Monday, Wednesday, Thursday and Friday, organized by the Imam Bukhari Al-Atsari Foundation.

In 2017, Ubay bin Kaab Islamic Boarding School changed its routine study schedule to Monday-Friday and Sunday.

On 25–27 August 2017 at Gelora Sarolangun Emas, the Sa'ad Bin Abi Waqqash (SBAW) archery club from Ubay bin Ka'ab Jambi succeeded in sweeping all the numbers for the adult category in the Inter-Club Archery Competition championship throughout Jambi Province. By successfully winning the overall championship title, the SBAW archery club is entitled to the Sarolangun Regent's rotating trophy. The club has been around since November 1, 2016. This non-athlete archery club has 70 members from various circles, ranging from sunnah study circles, students, to the general public. The following is a list of winners in the adult category in the 2017 Jambi Province Inter-Club Archery Competition:

Point-I Category 20 m
Champion	Name	Club
1	Abdul Qadir	SBAW
2	Mr. Ridwan	SBAW
3	Redi Sugiri	SBAW

Point-II Category 20 m
Champion	Name	Club
1	Abdul Qadir	SBAW
2	Mr. Ridwan	SBAW
3	Abu Syauqi	SBAW

Complaint Category (Favorite)
Champion	Name	Club
1	Abdul Qadir	SBAW
2	Mr. Ridwan	SBAW
3	Doni V.H	SBAW

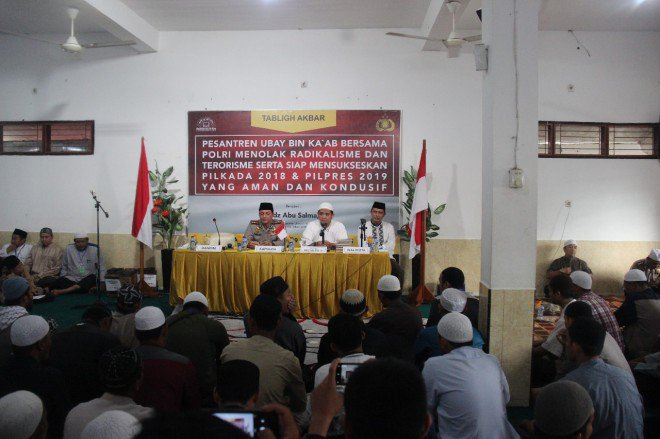
Ubay bin Kaab Islamic Boarding School Collaborates with the Police to Hold a Grand Tablig and Anti-Radicalism & Terrorism Decoration

In May 2018, the leadership and management of the Ubay Bin Kaab Islamic Boarding School held a grand tabligh in the context of a declaration to reject radicalism and terrorism.

During the COVID-19 pandemic, people were more enthusiastic about participating in offline Salafiyah preaching activities than online.

On February 5, 2023, the Jambi Police's Binmas Directorate provided socialization on preventing radicalism at this Islamic boarding school.

In 2021, Jambi Immigration Implemented the Eazy Passport Service at the Ubay Bin Kaab Islamic Boarding School which was attended by the Head of Intelligence and Immigration Enforcement of the Jambi Kemenkumham Regional Office, Mr. Sutejo and accompanied directly by the Head of Lantaskim Mr. M. Hidayat, and the activity was carried out while still paying attention to health protocols.

On December 3, 2023, routine studies will only be on Sunday mornings with the study of the book, and Thursday evenings with the study of the interpretation of the Al-Qur'an.

In November 2025, this Islamic boarding school will start opening a bachelor's degree program for adults, with a tuition administration fee of Rp. 100,000/month.

== Mosque ==
Ubay bin Kaab Mosque is a mosque located on Jl. Golf II Pematang Sulur, Telanaipura, Jambi City. This mosque was founded at the same time as the Ubay bin Kaab Islamic Boarding School.

== Gallery ==
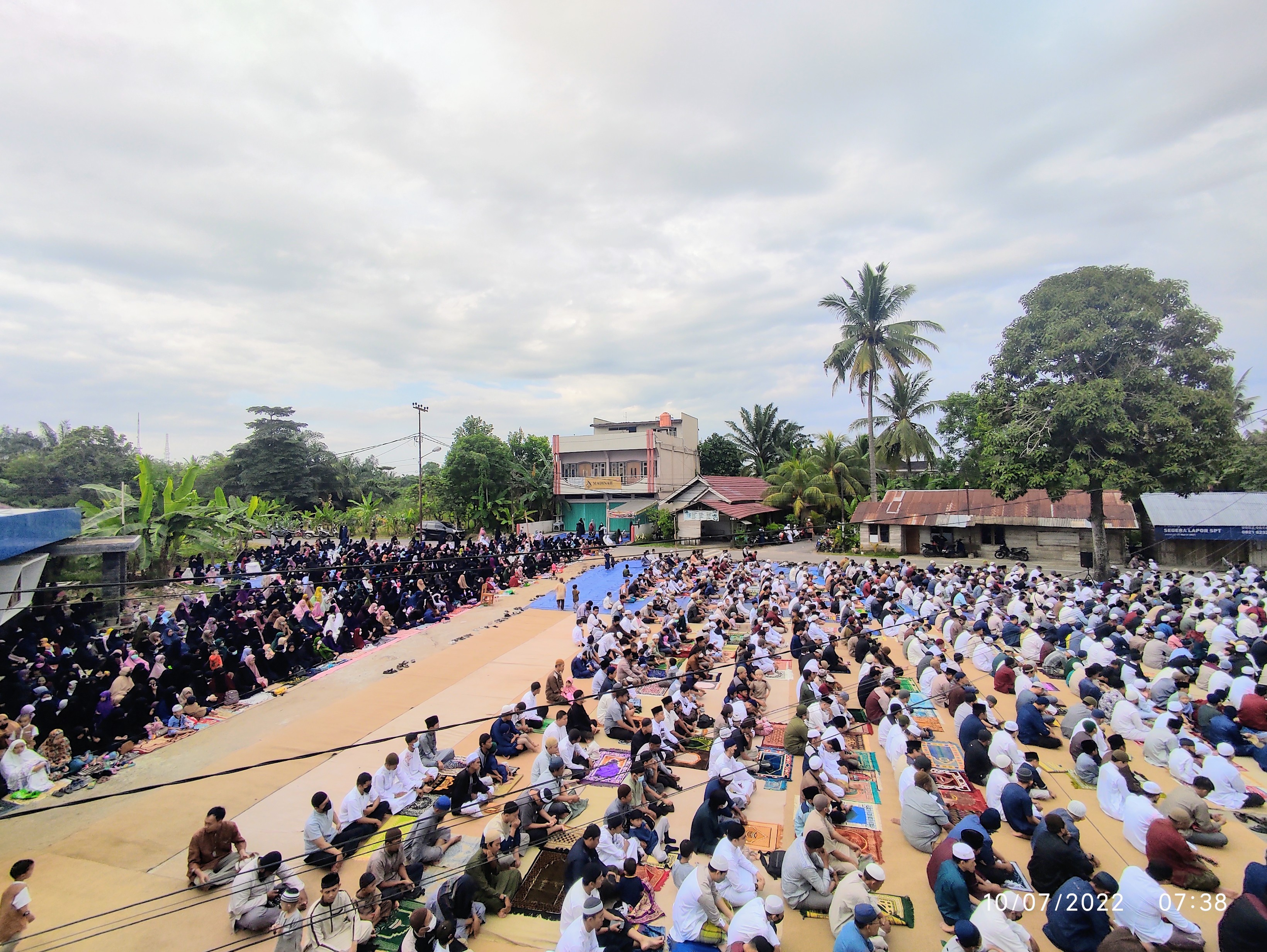
The atmosphere of Eid al-Adha in front of the Ubay bin Kaab Mosque in Jambi

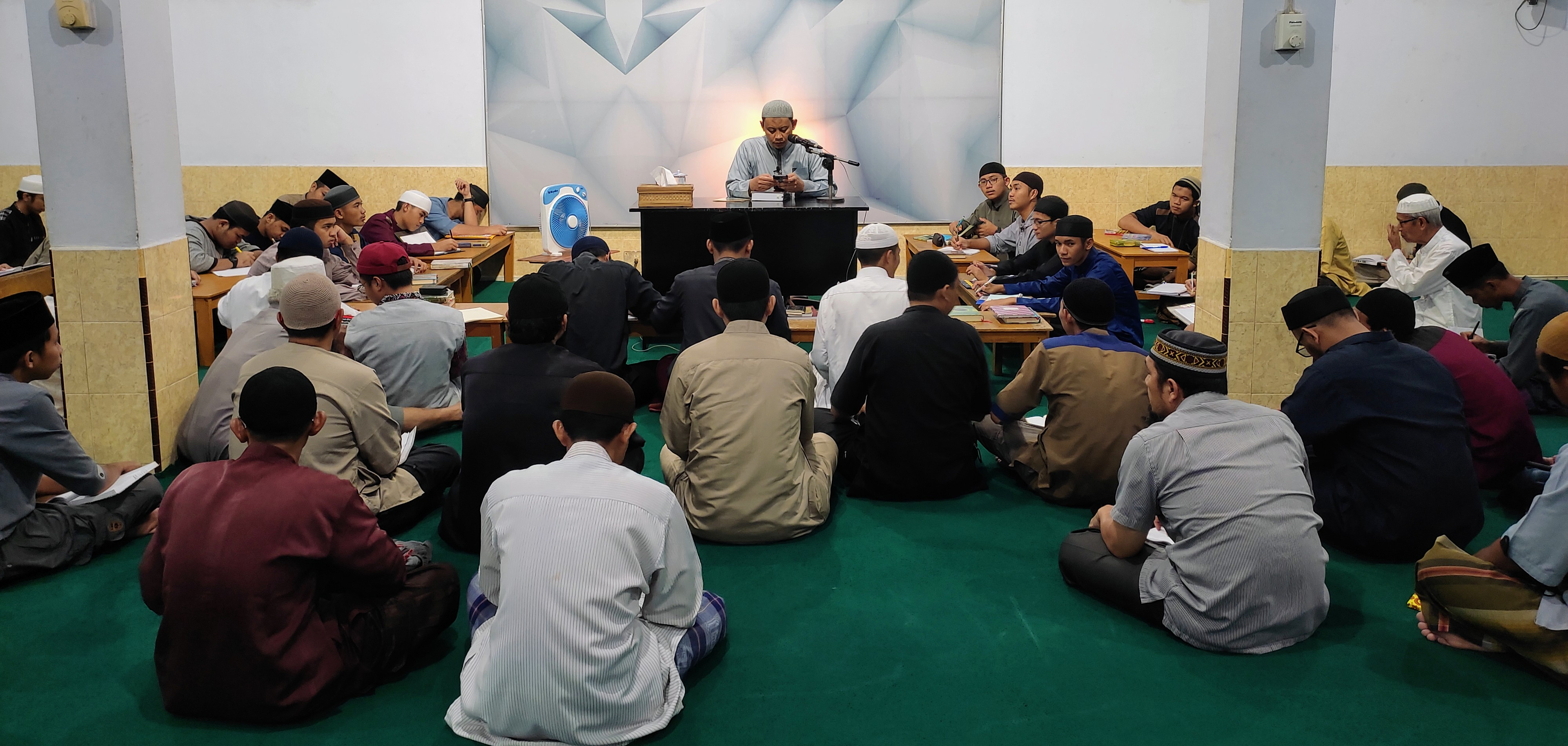
Routine Study Atmosphere at Ubay bin Kaab Mosque, Jambi

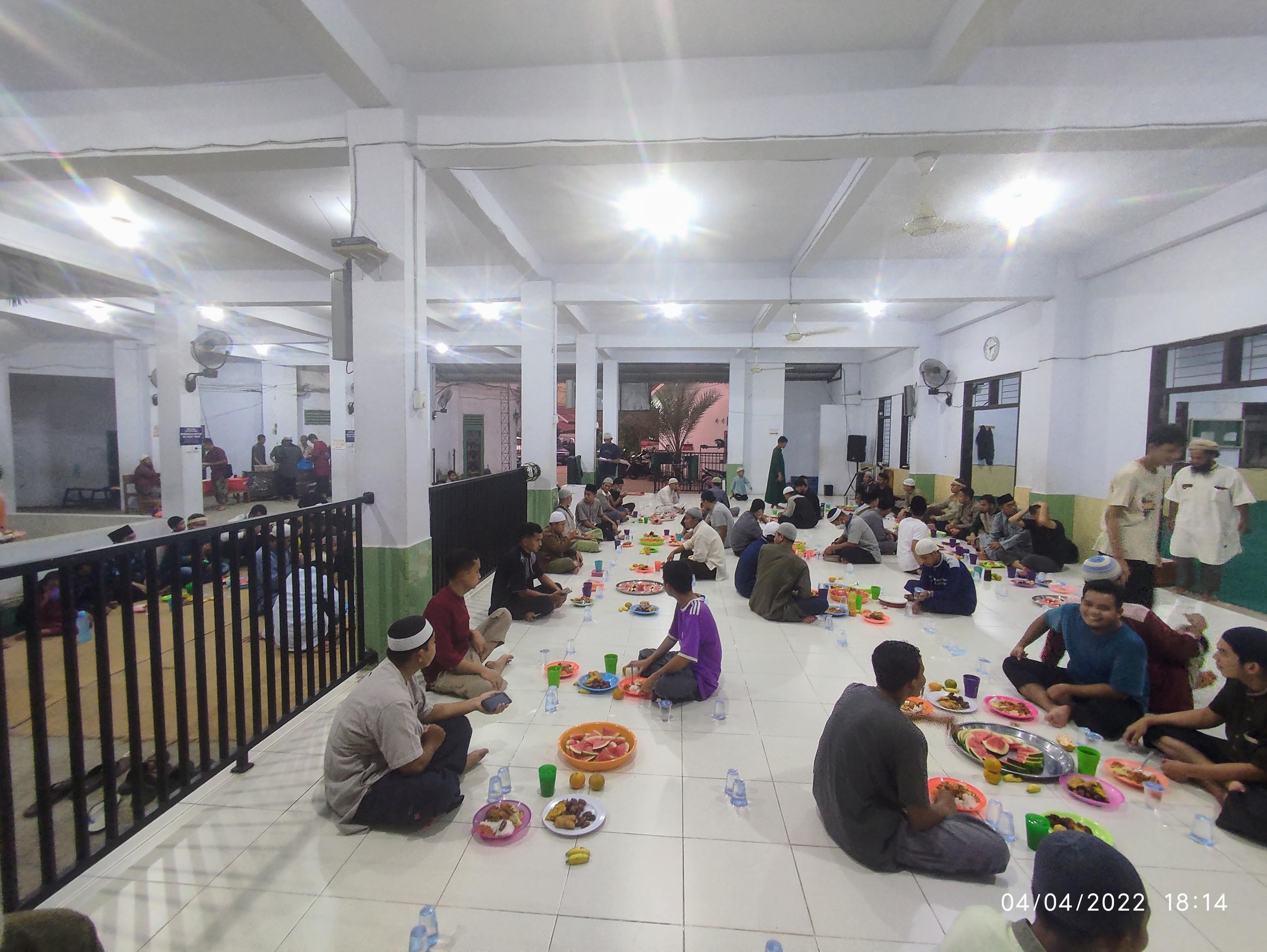
The atmosphere of breaking the fast at the Ubay bin Kaab Mosque in Jambi

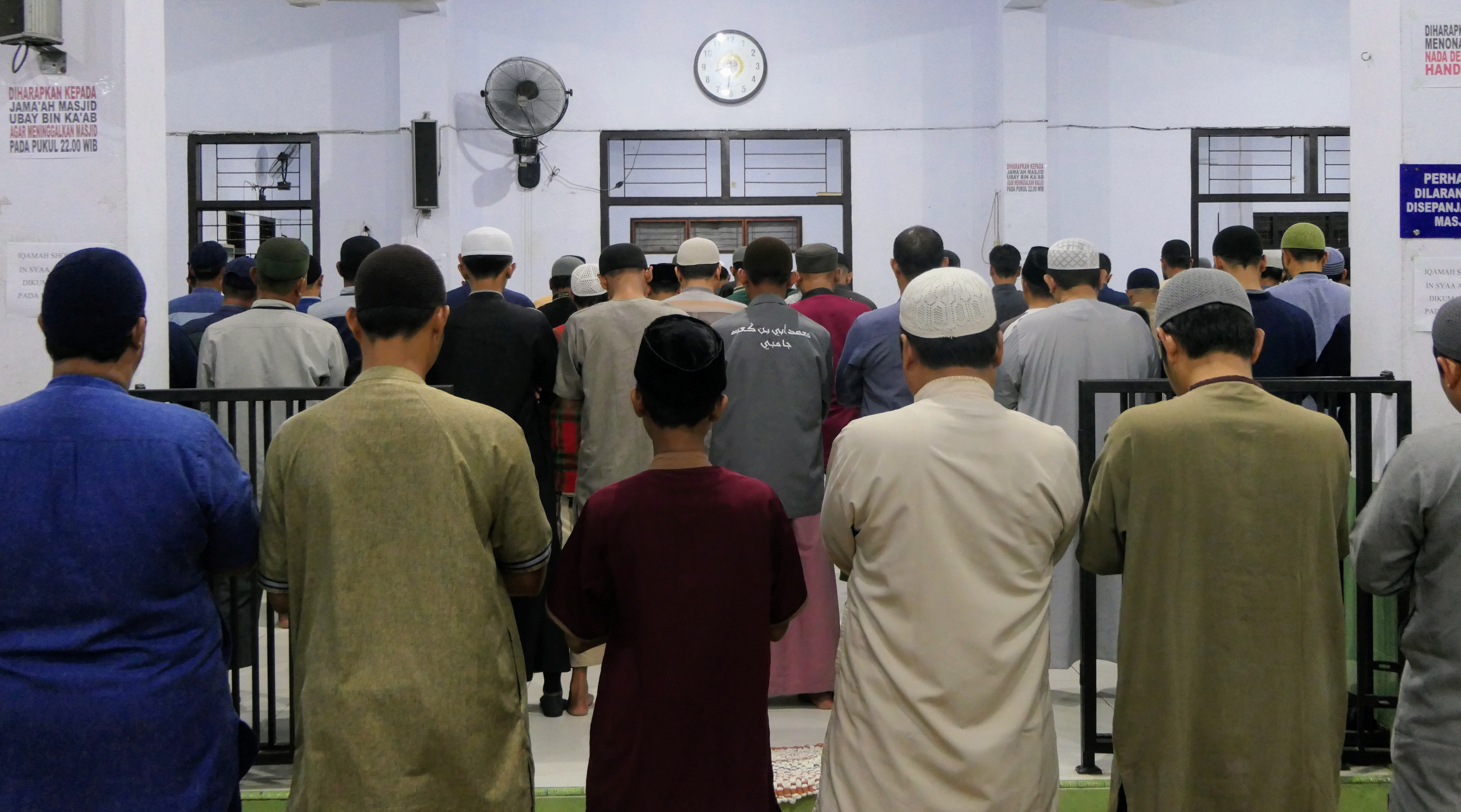
Tarawih Prayer in Congregation at Ubay bin Kaab Mosque

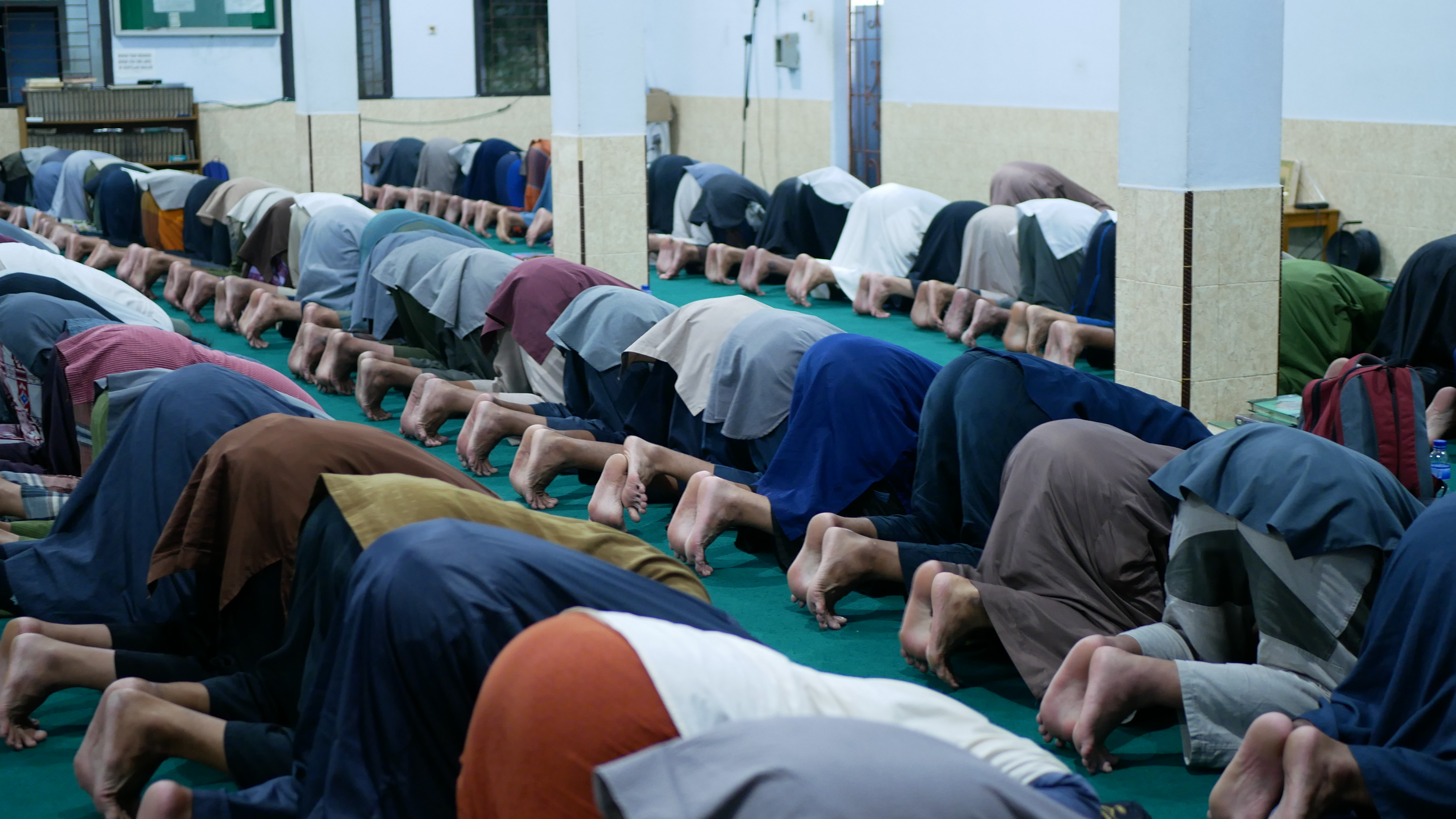
Tarawih prayer

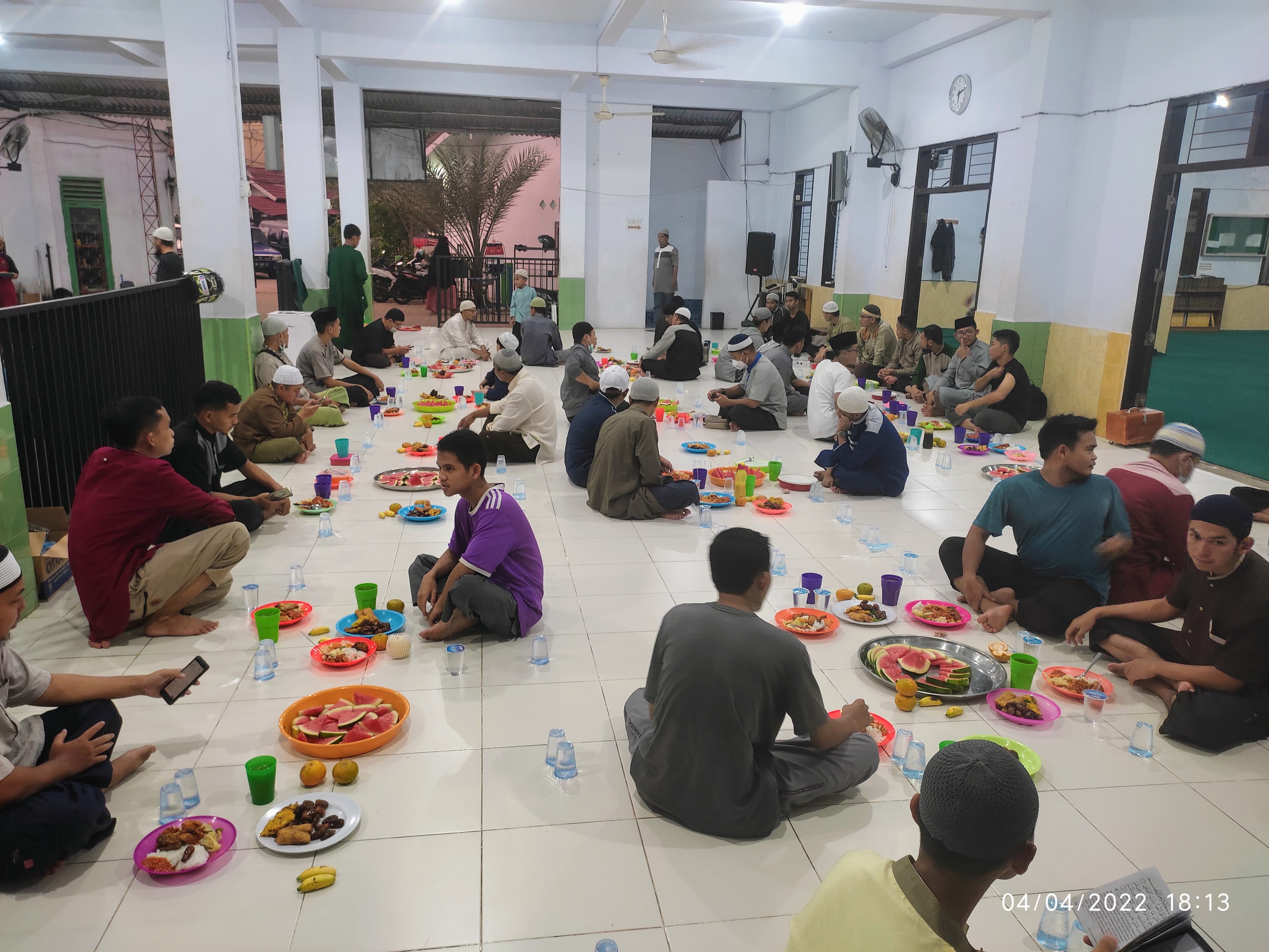
The atmosphere of breaking the fast at the Ubay bin Kaab Mosque in Jambi

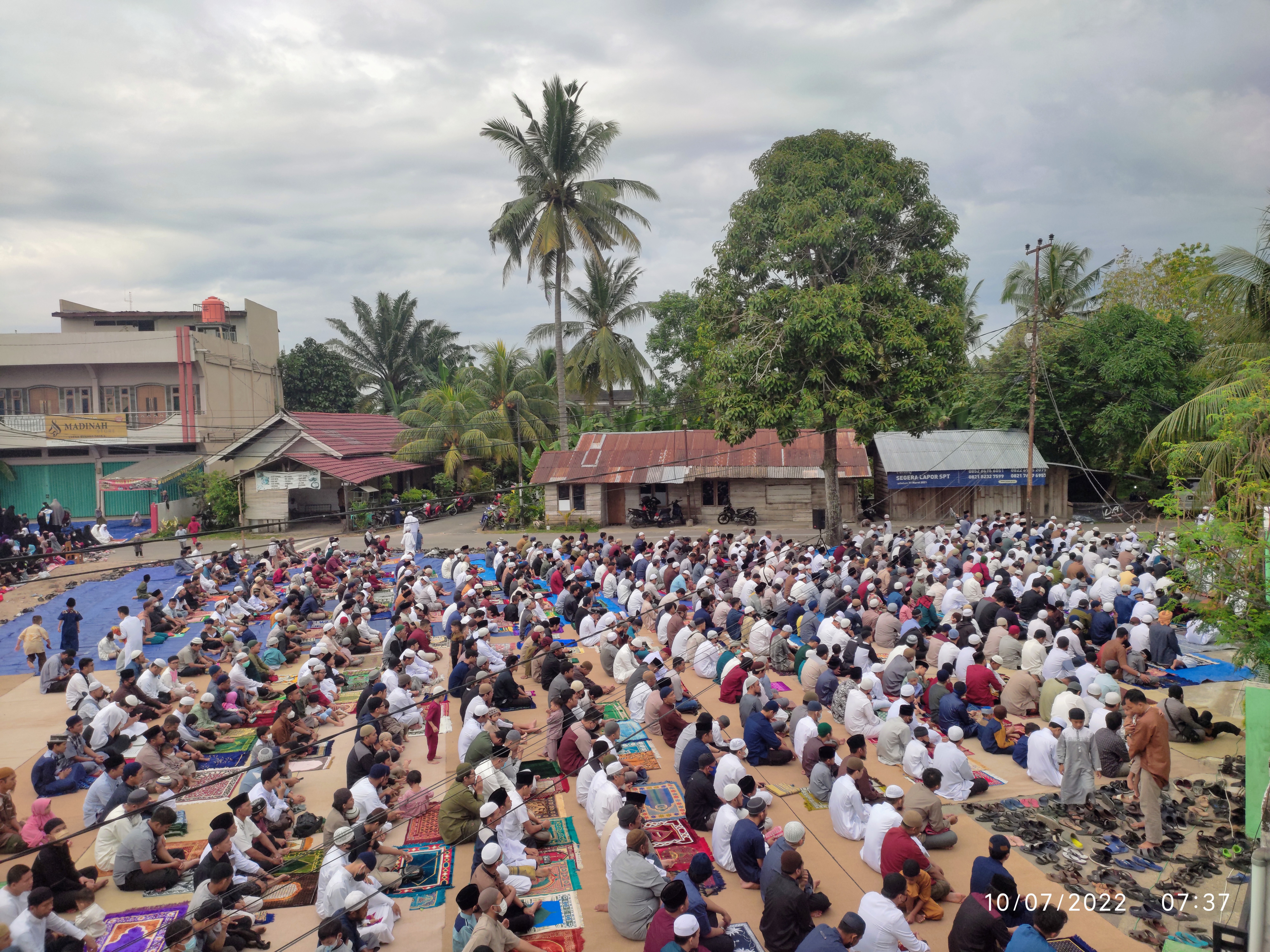
The atmosphere of Eid al-Adha in front of the Ubay bin Kaab Mosque in Jambi

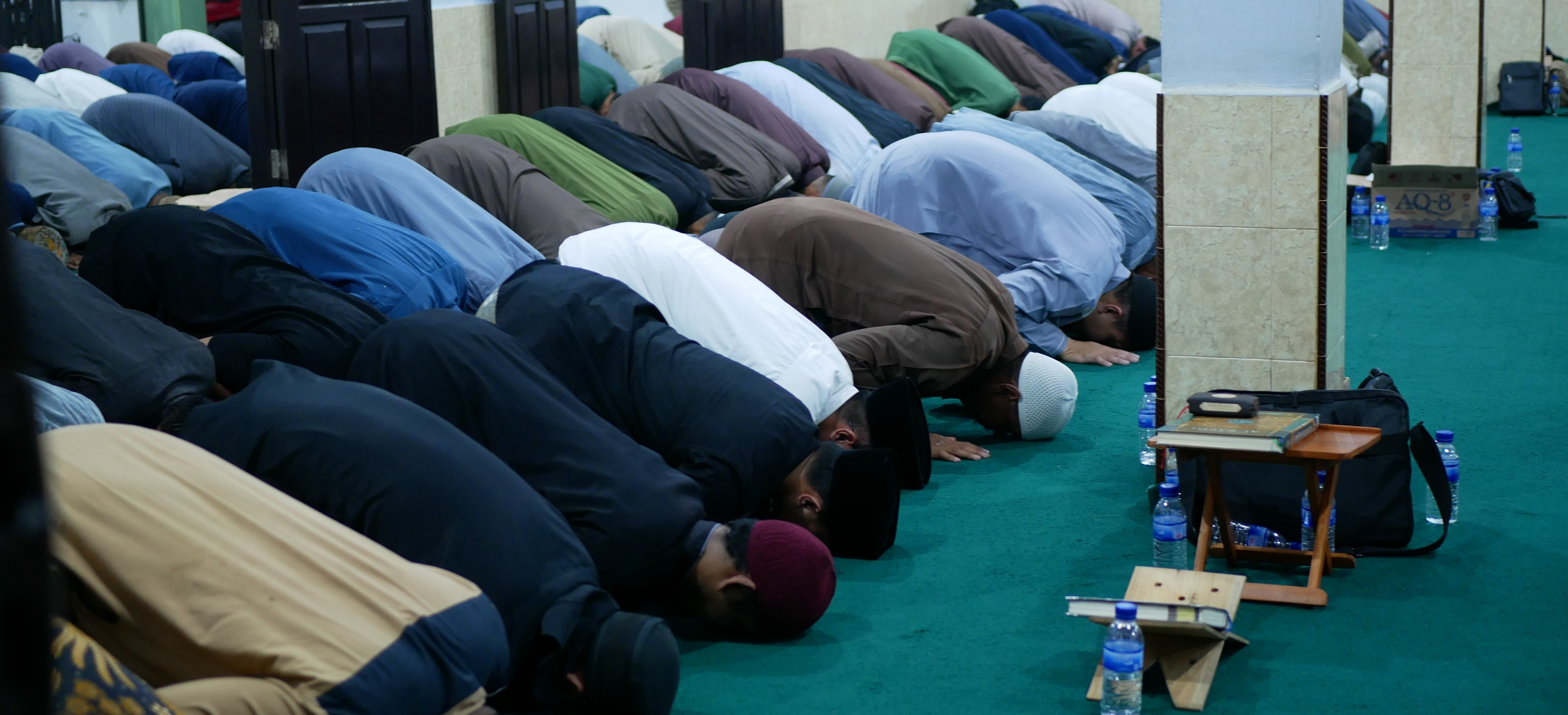
The atmosphere of Tarawih prayers in congregation at the Ubay bin Kaab Mosque

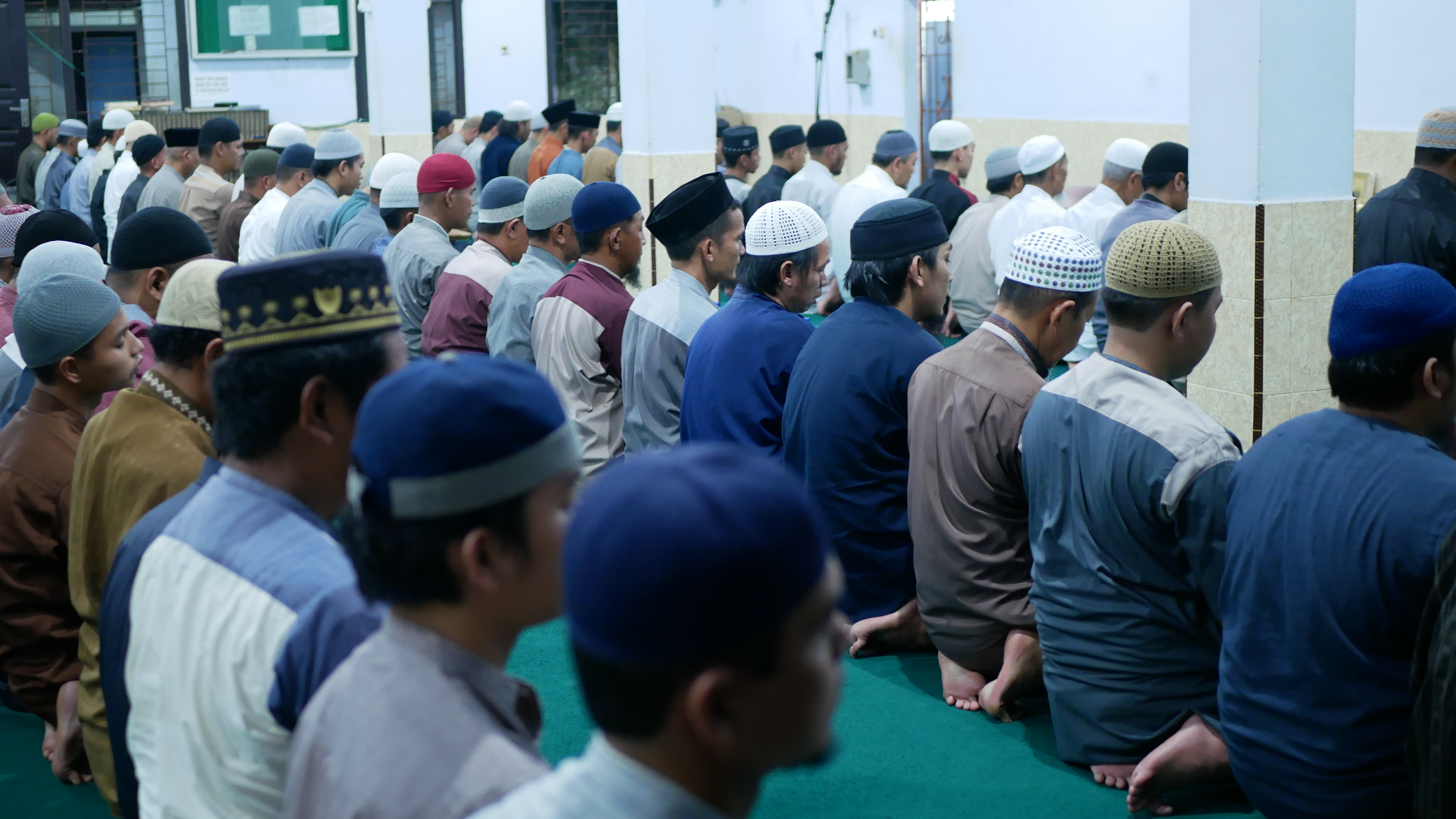
The atmosphere of Tarawih prayers in congregation at the Ubay bin Kaab Mosque

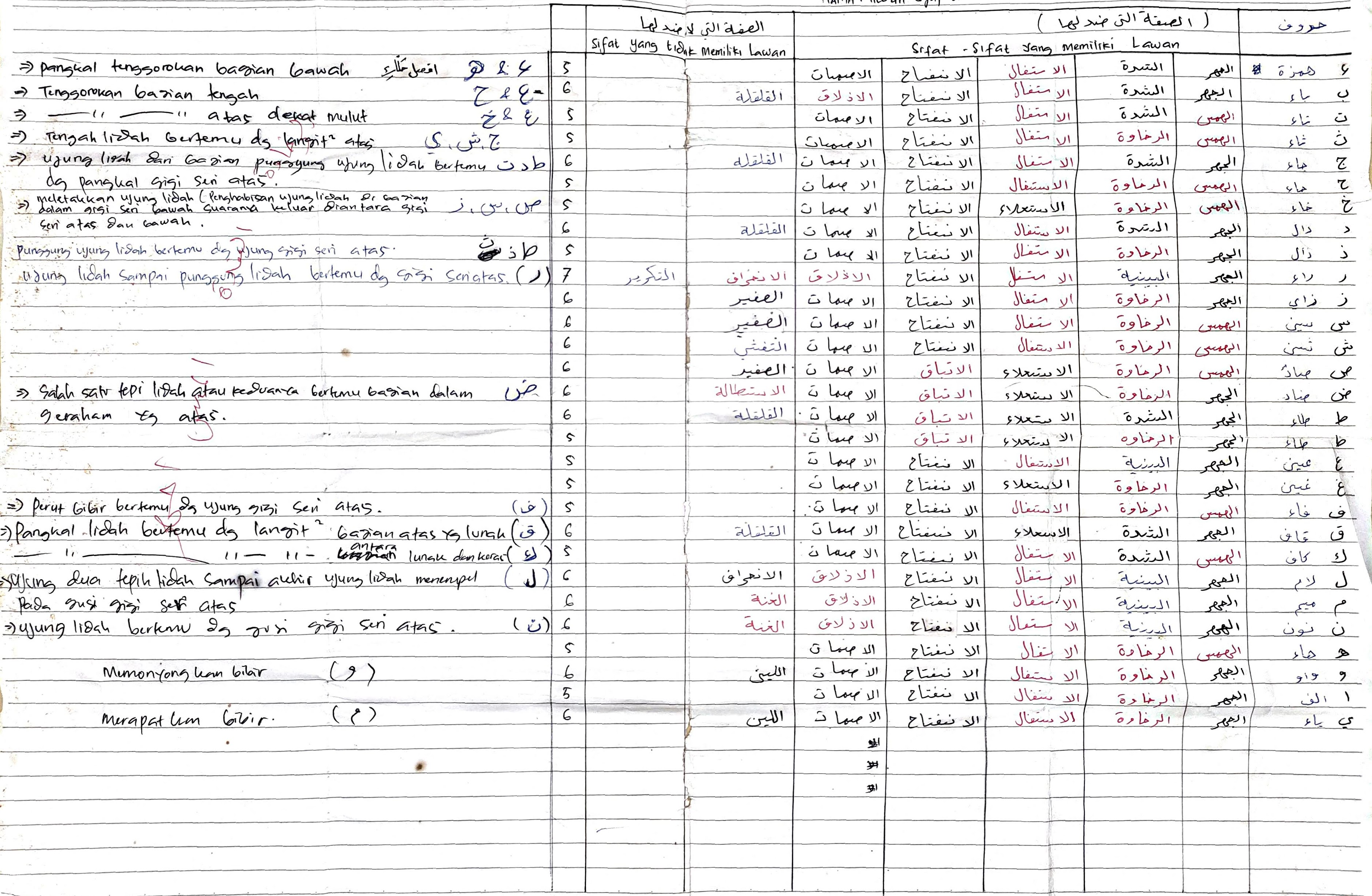
The Nature of Letters by Santri Ubay bin Kaab Jambi

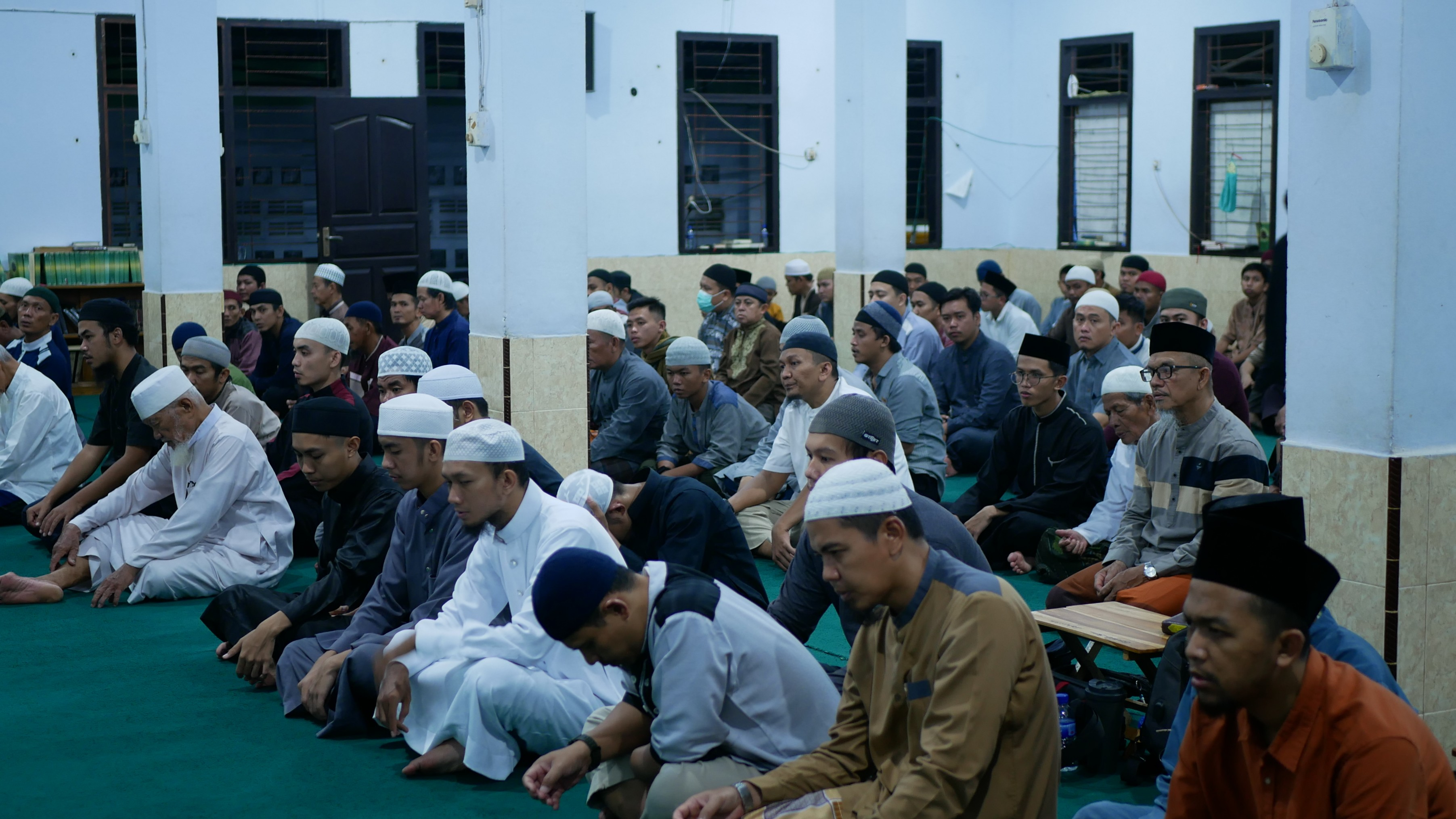
After Isya prayer waiting for tarawih prayer

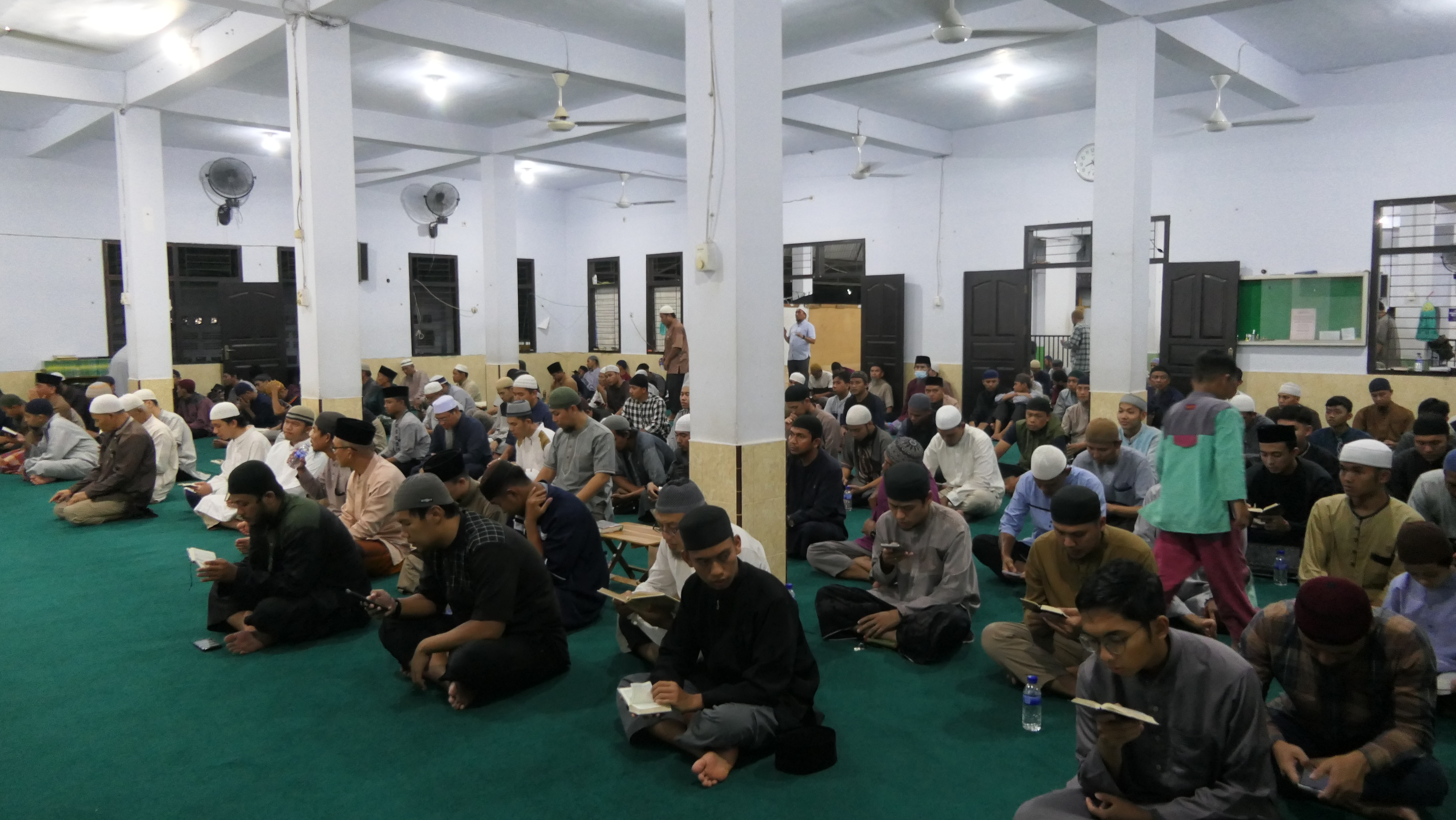
Reading the Quran while waiting for Isha prayer

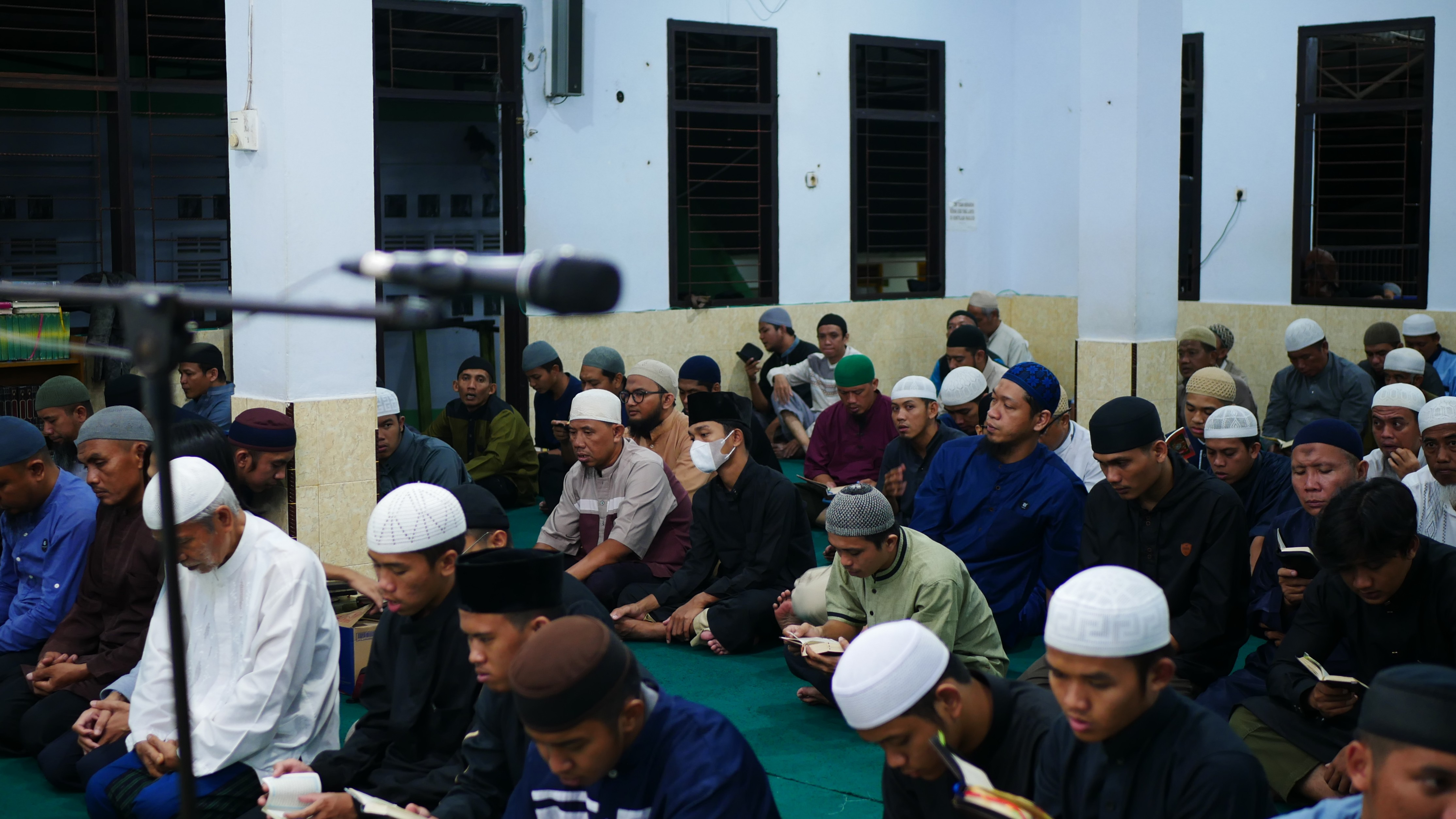
Congregation Waiting for Prayer Imam

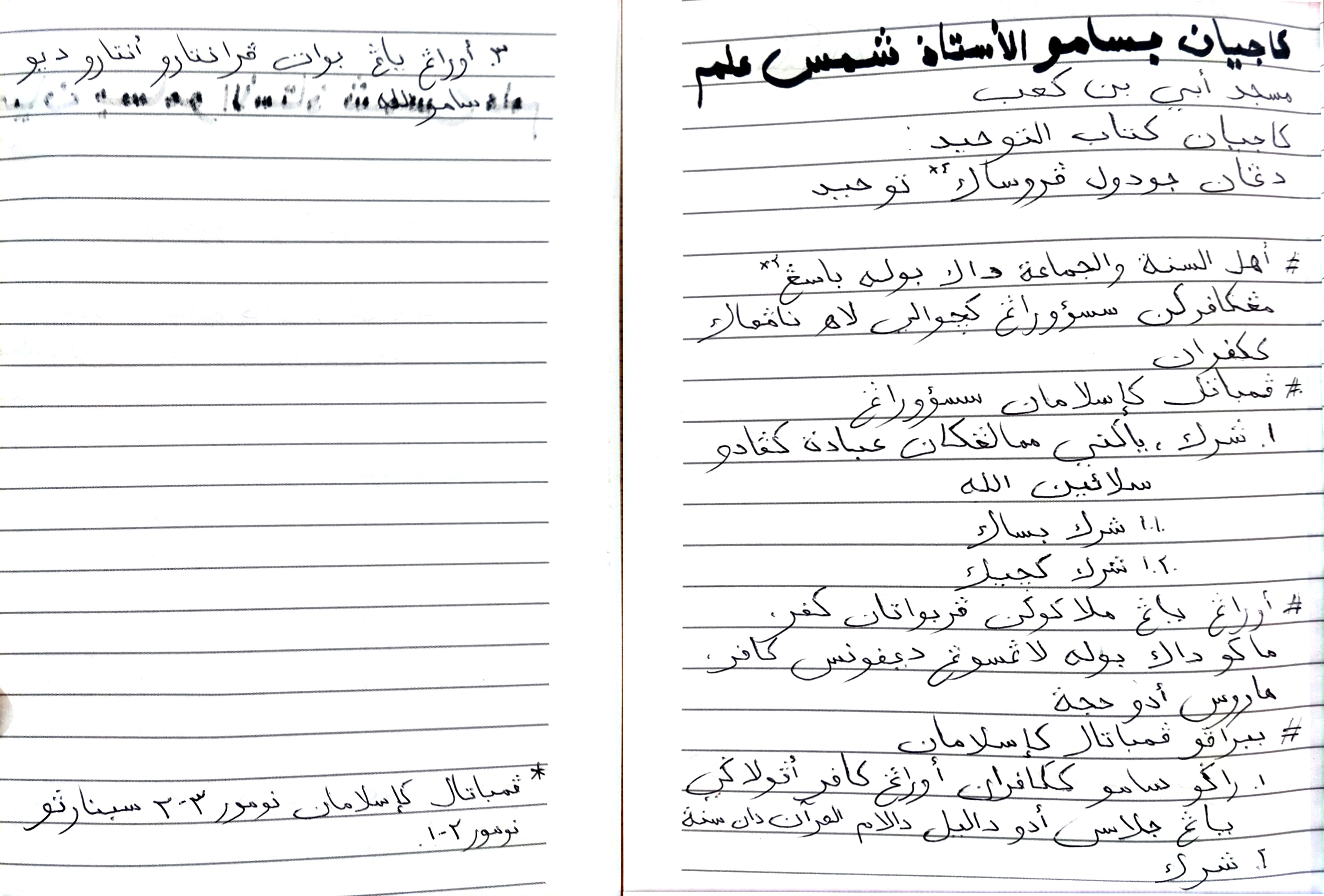
Tawhid Study Notes

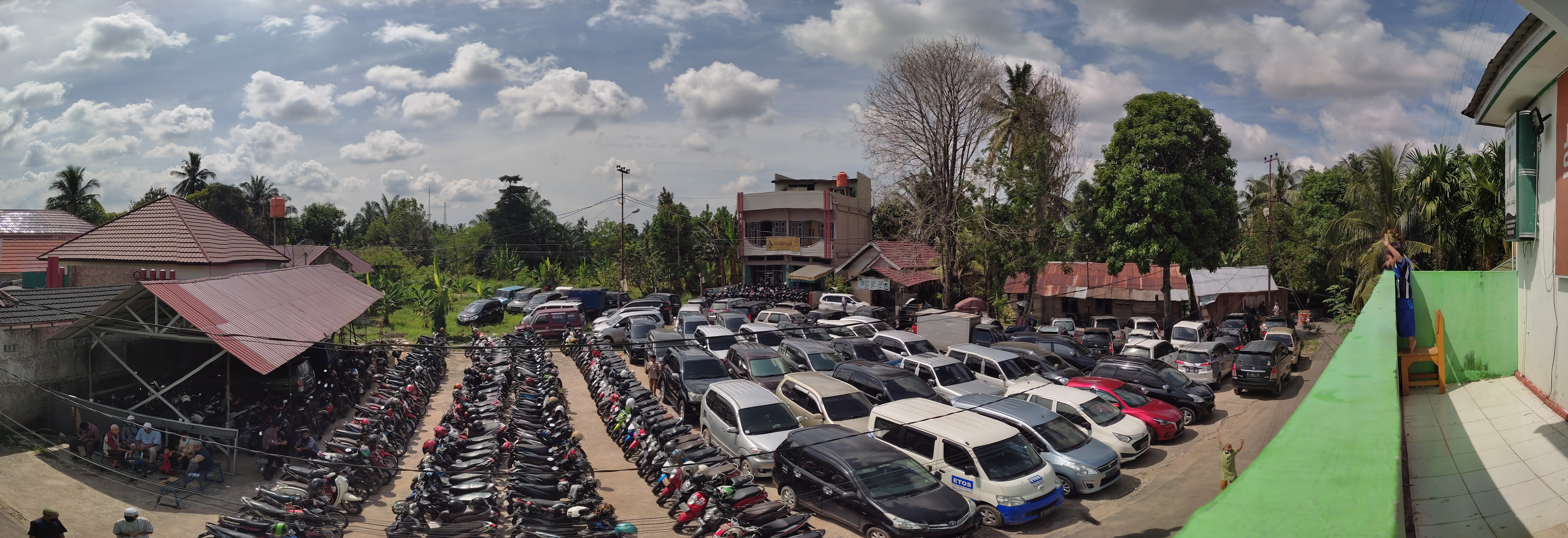
Panorama of the parking atmosphere in front of the Ubay bin Kaab Mosque

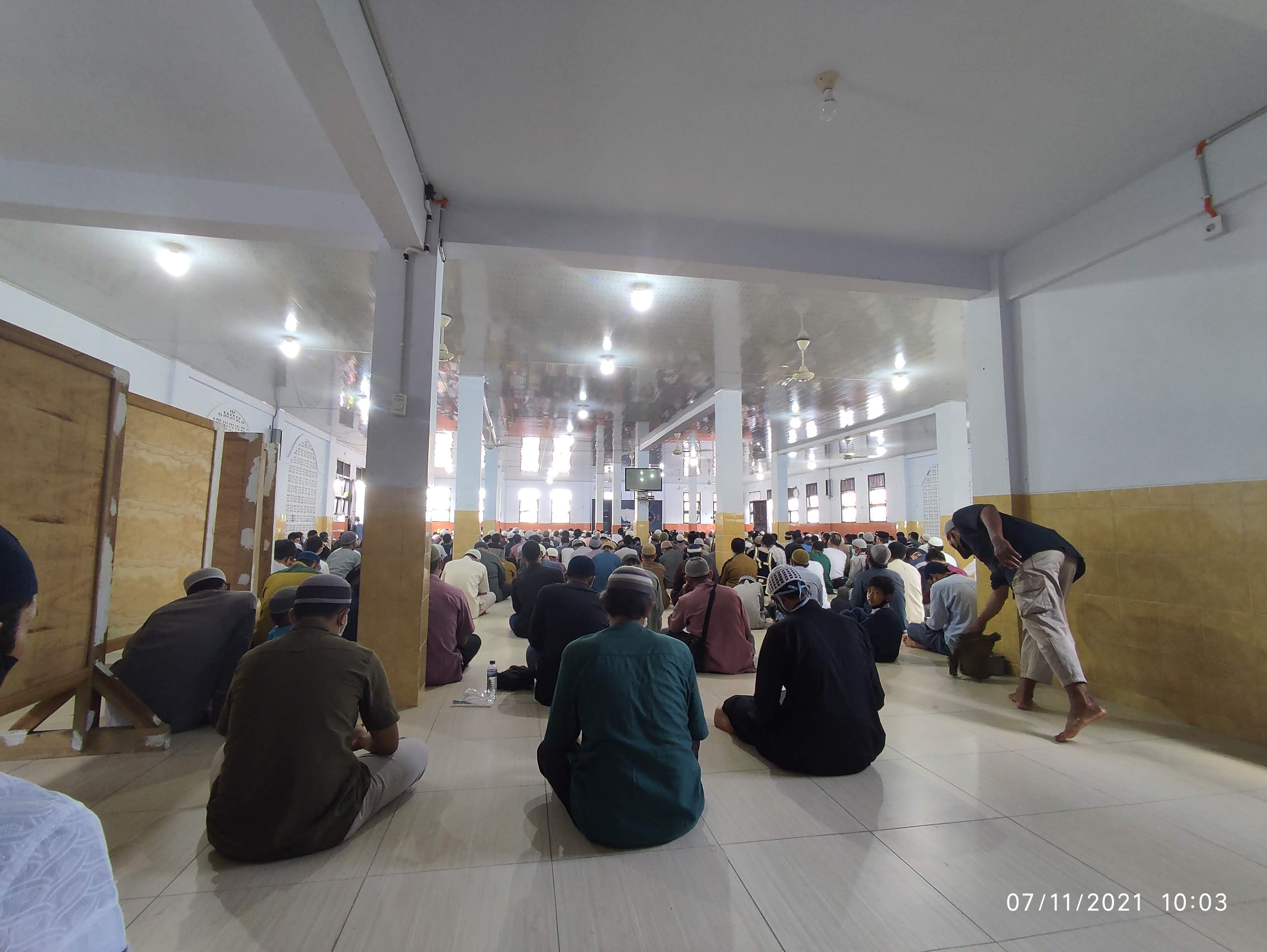
Sunday Study Atmosphere at the Ubay bin Kaab Mosque

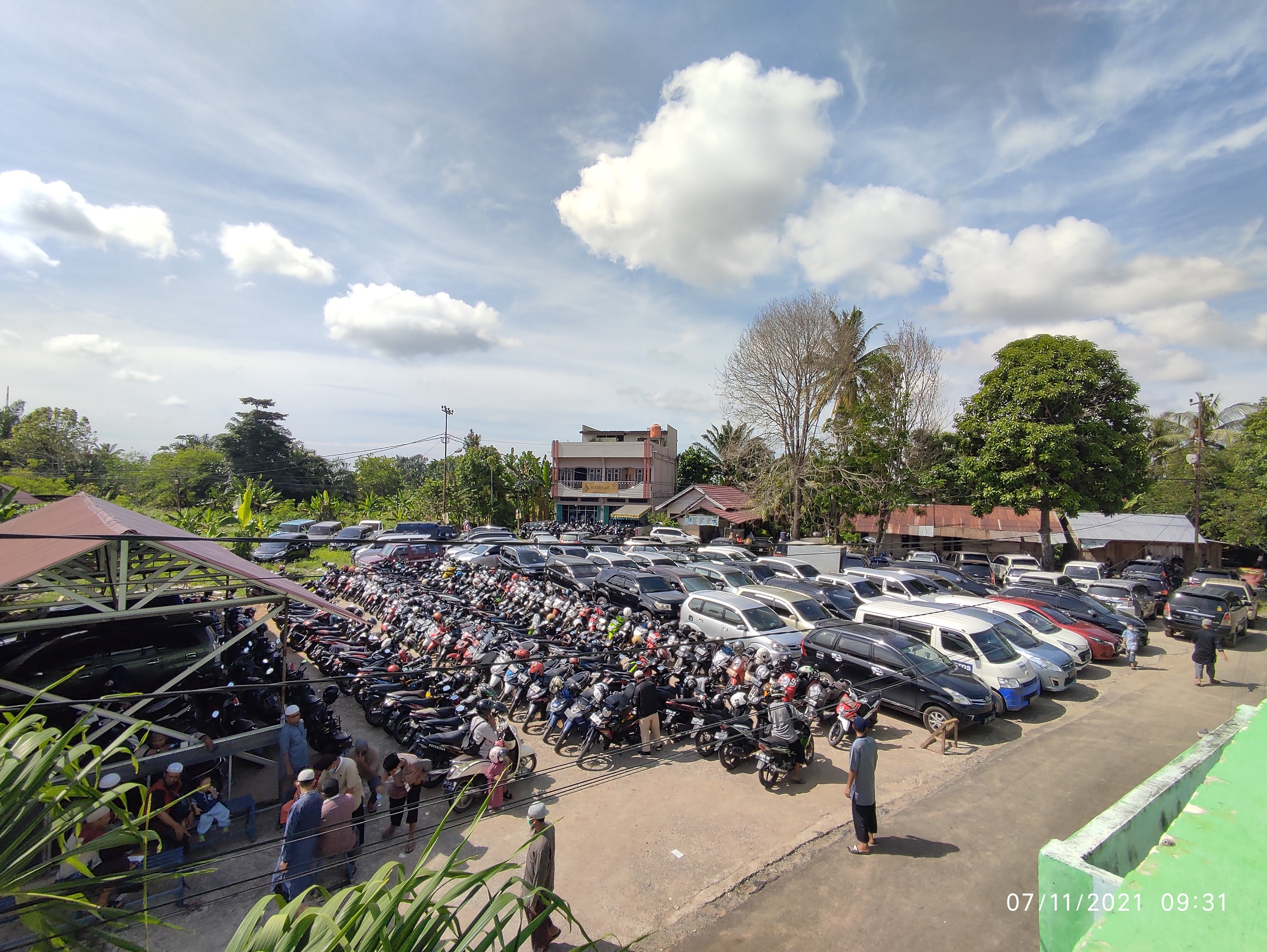
Parking Atmosphere in Front of Ubay bin Kaab Mosque

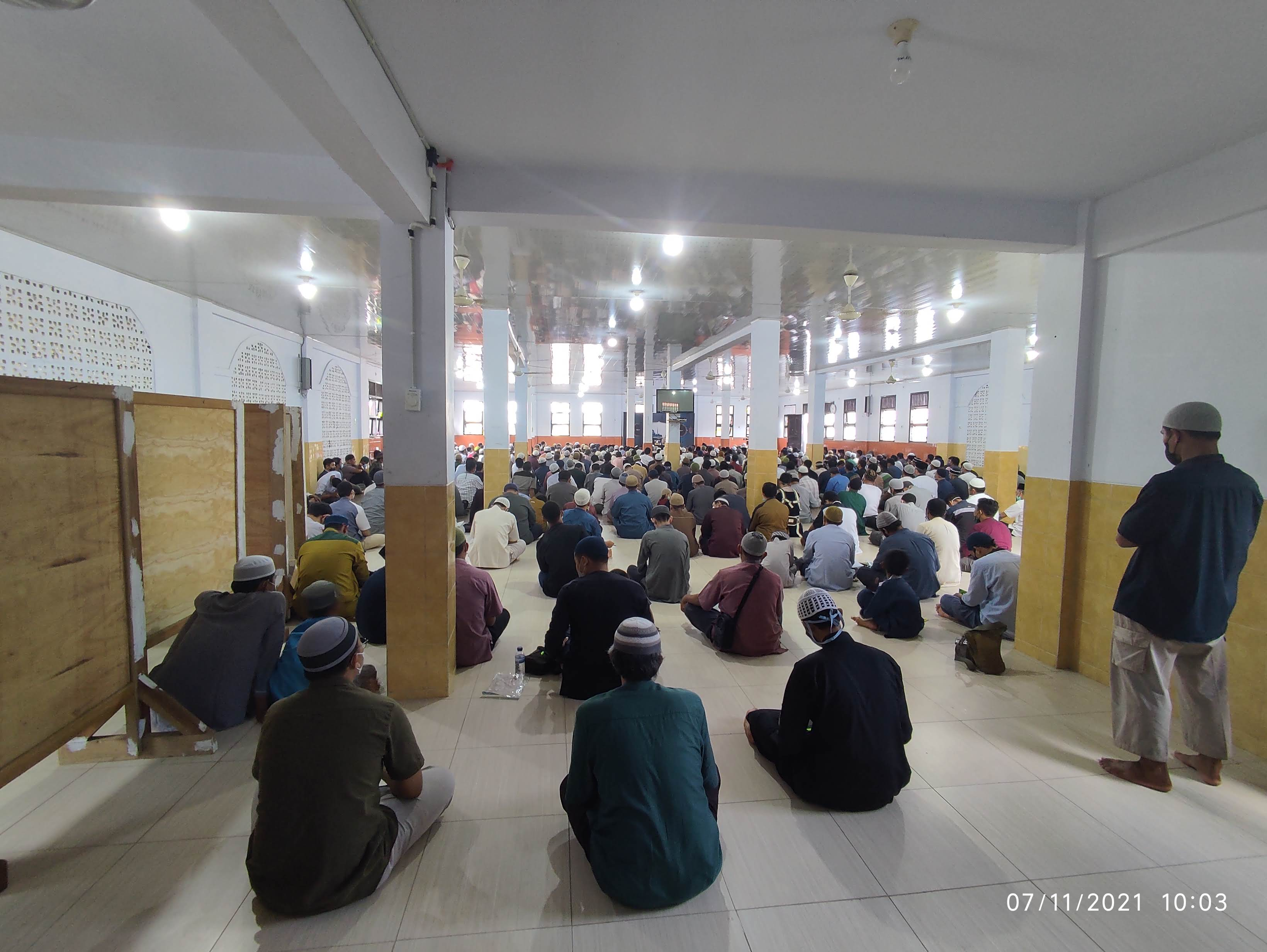
Routine Study Atmosphere at Ubay bin Kaab Mosque

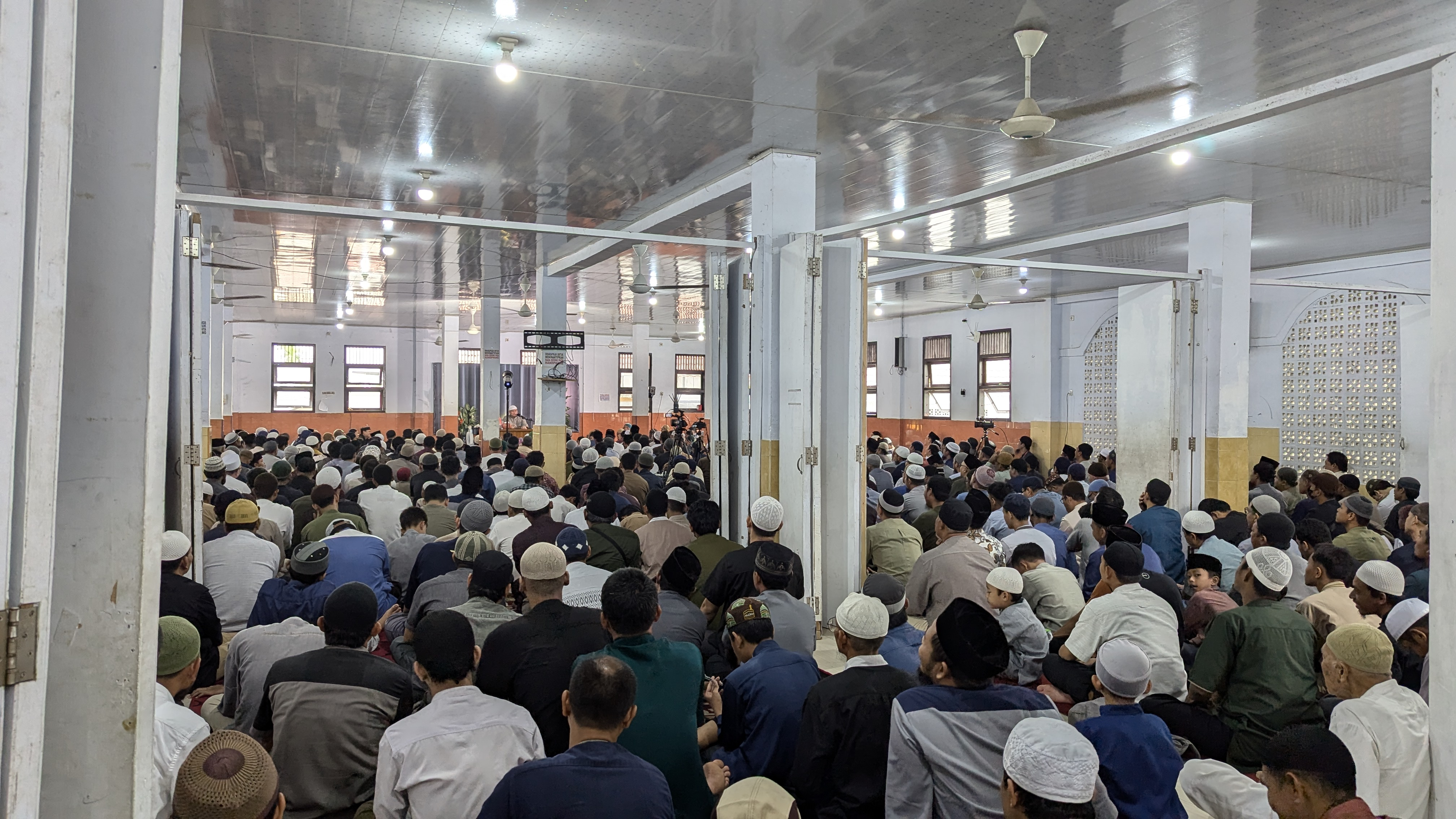
Ustaz Firanda Andirja's Grand Tablighi

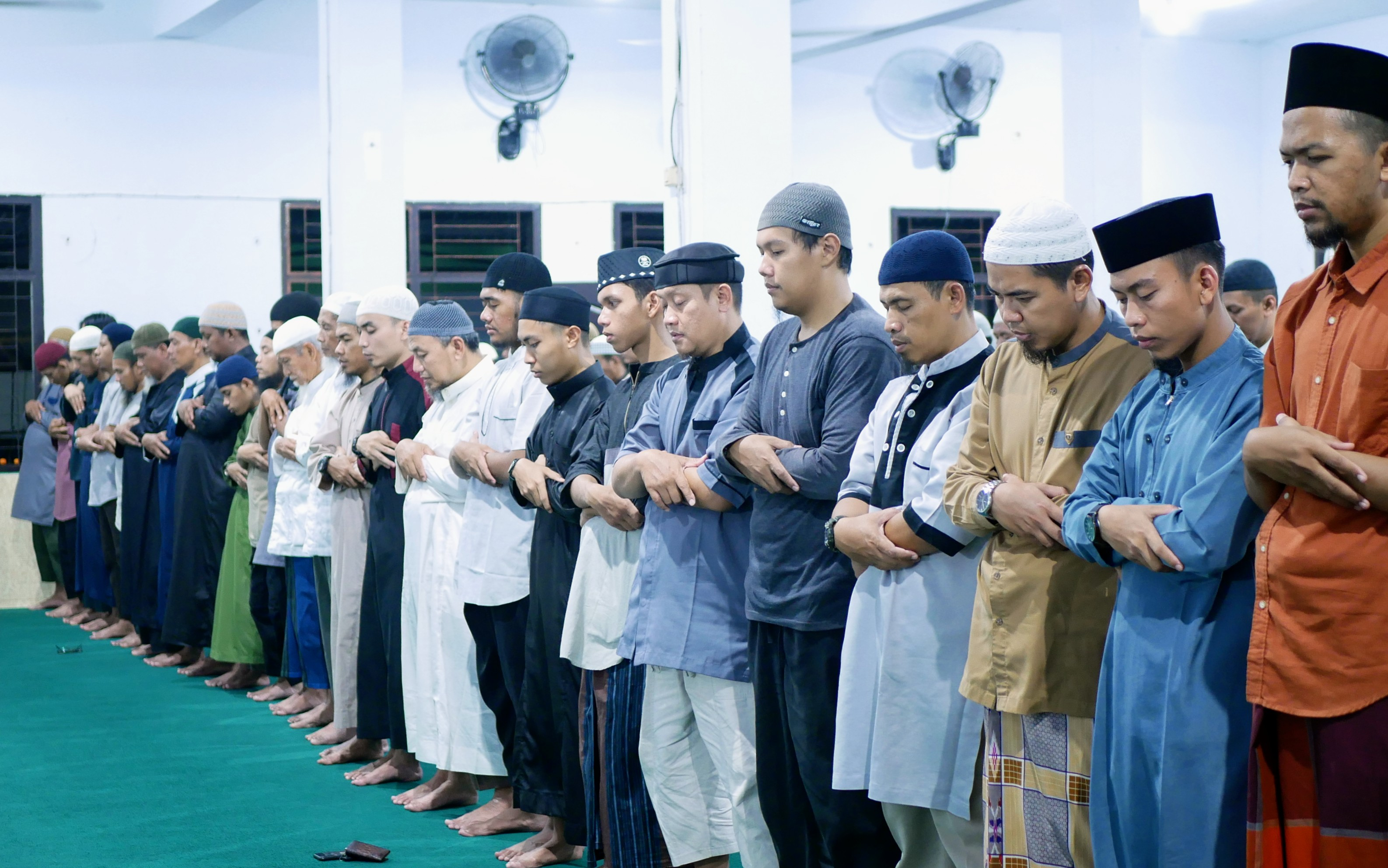
Congregation performs tarawih prayers

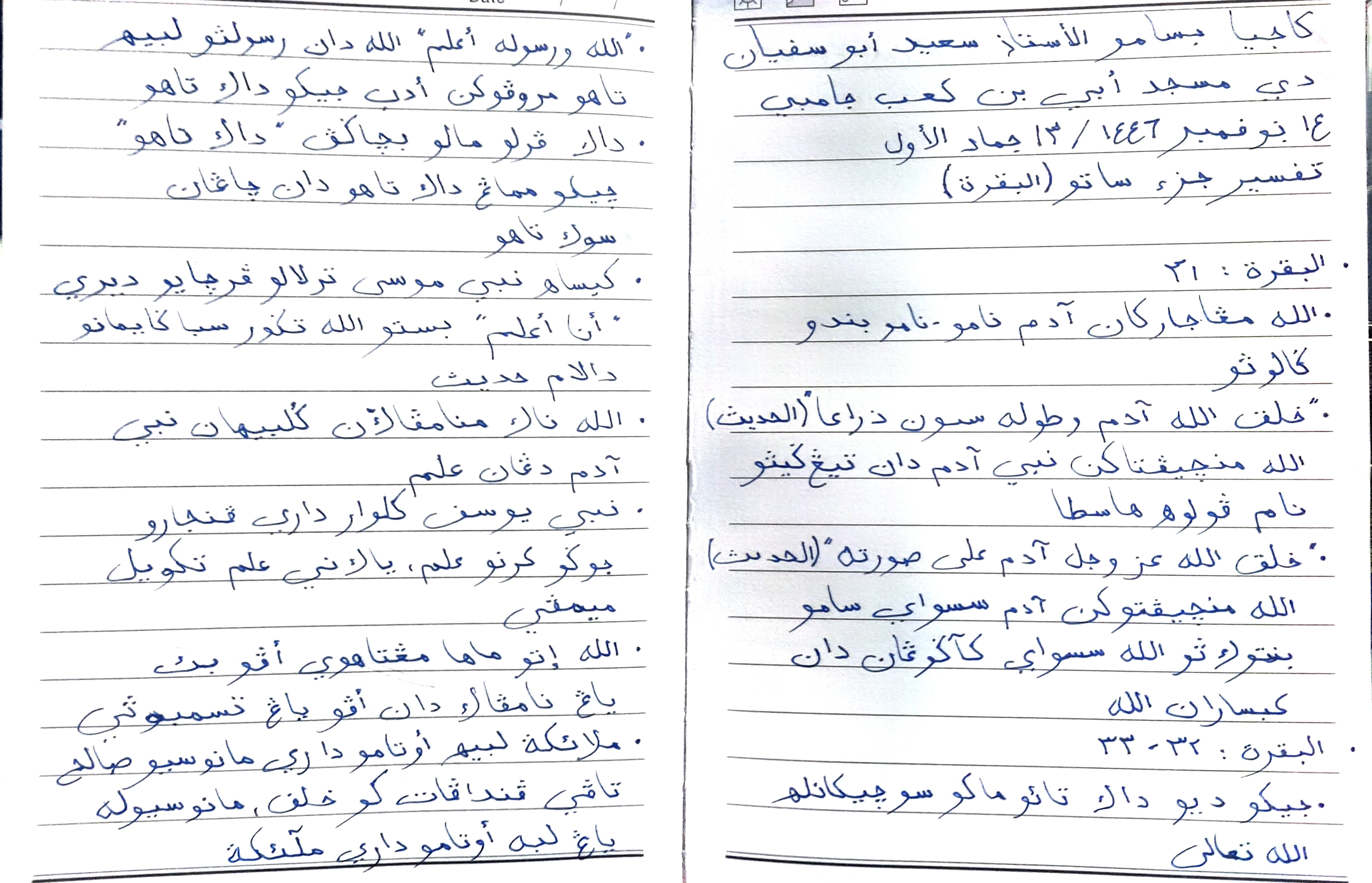
Jambi Language Interpretation Study Notes

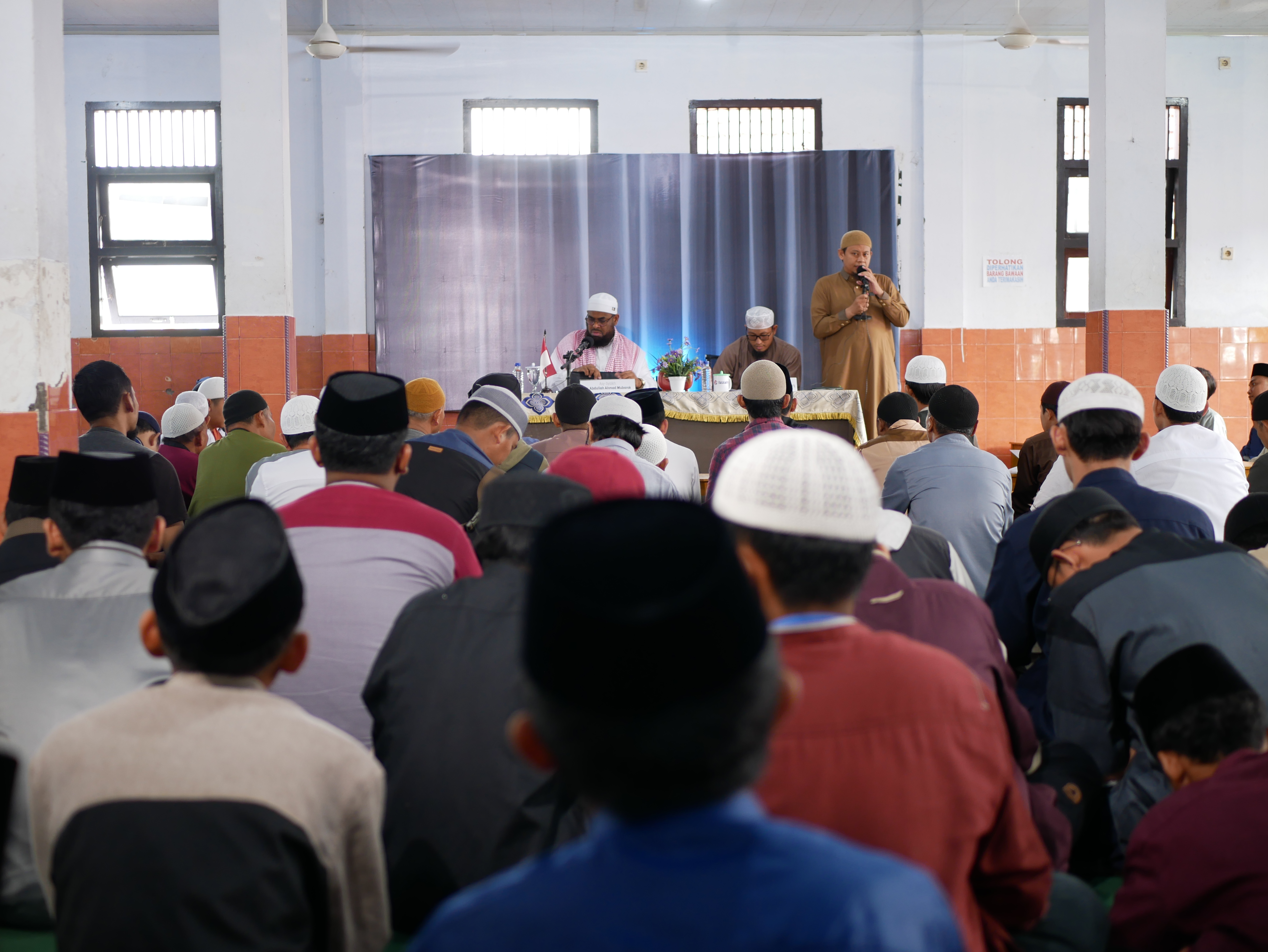
Safari of Da'wah of Sheikh Dr. Abdullah Ahmad Mubarok Badawi
