= Jambi (city) =

Capital and largest city of Jambi, Indonesia

- City
- City of Jambi; Kota Jambi

Other transcription(s)
  - Jawi: بندارايا جمبي
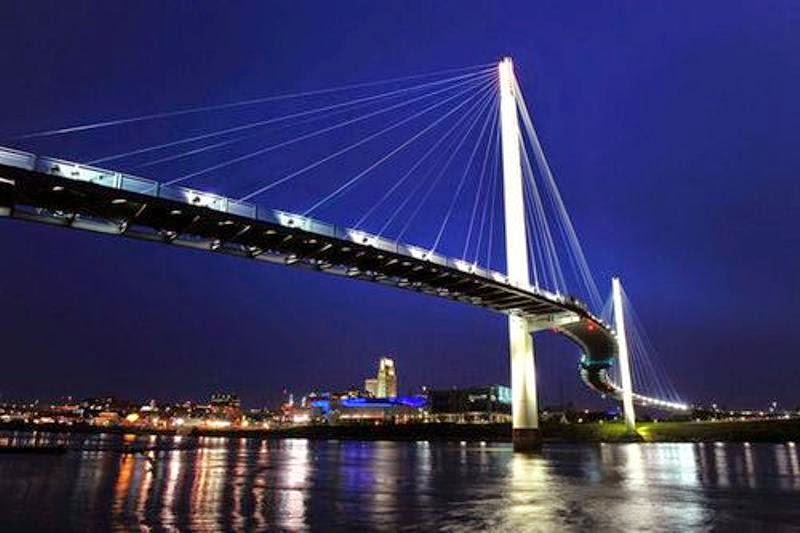
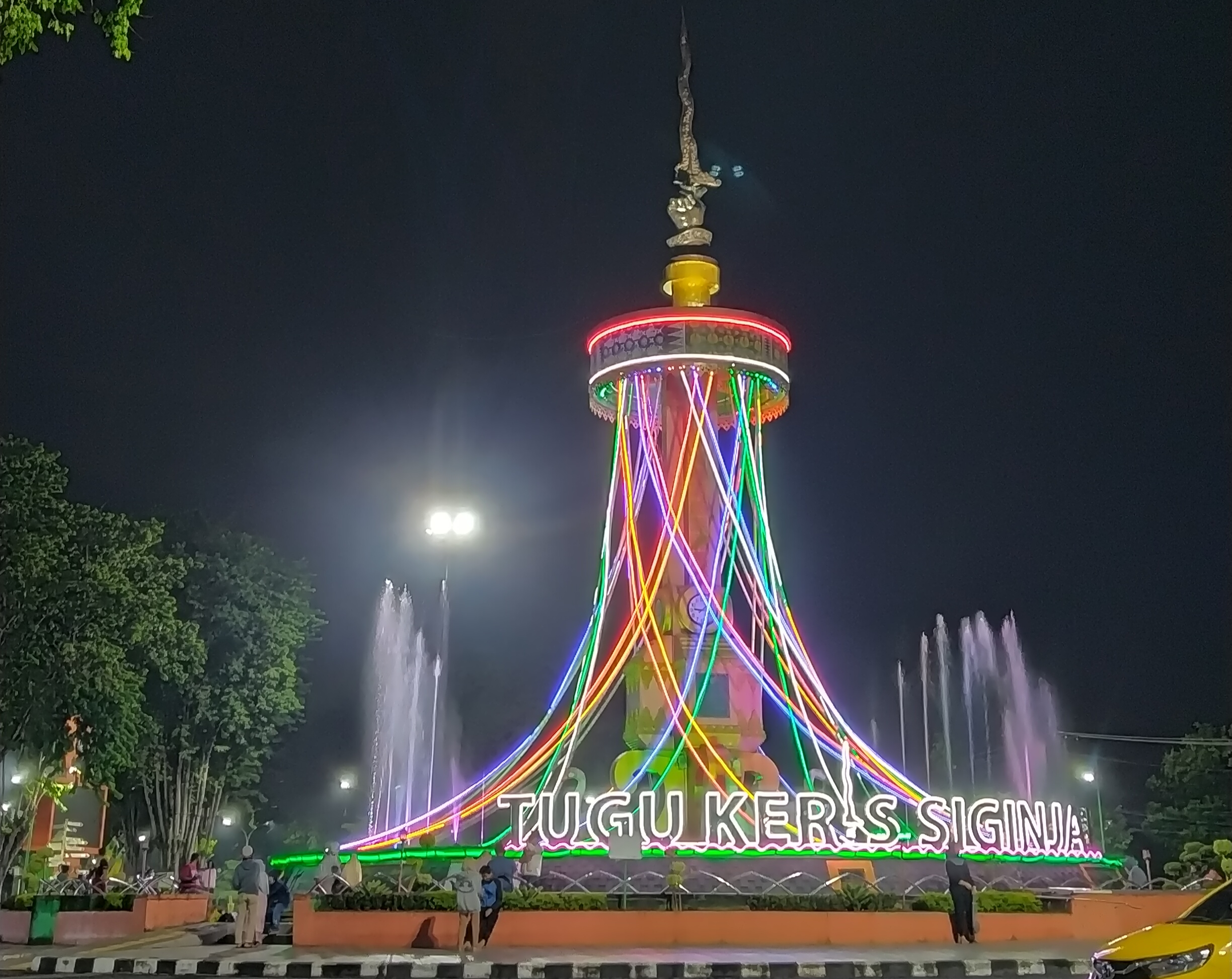
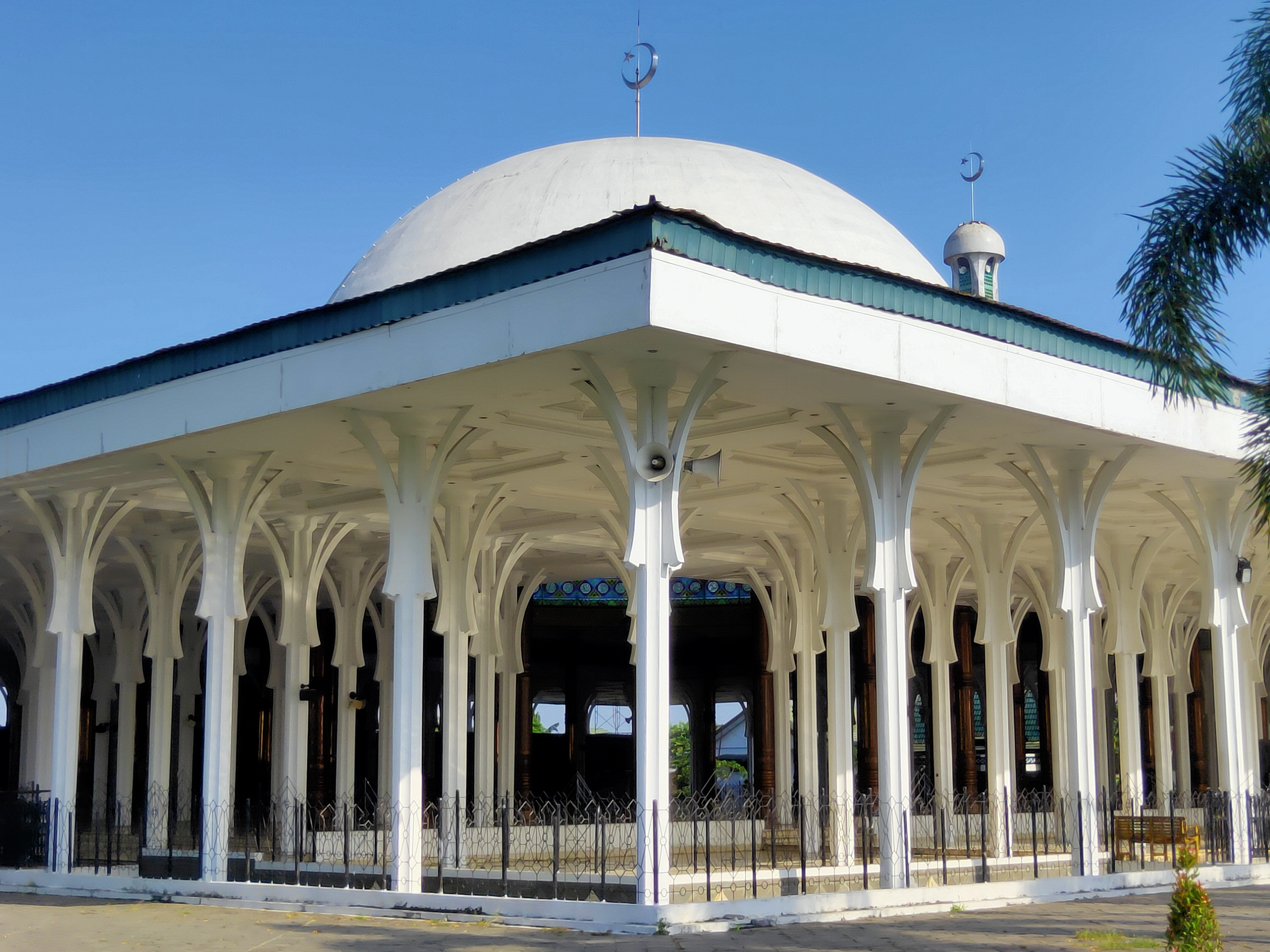
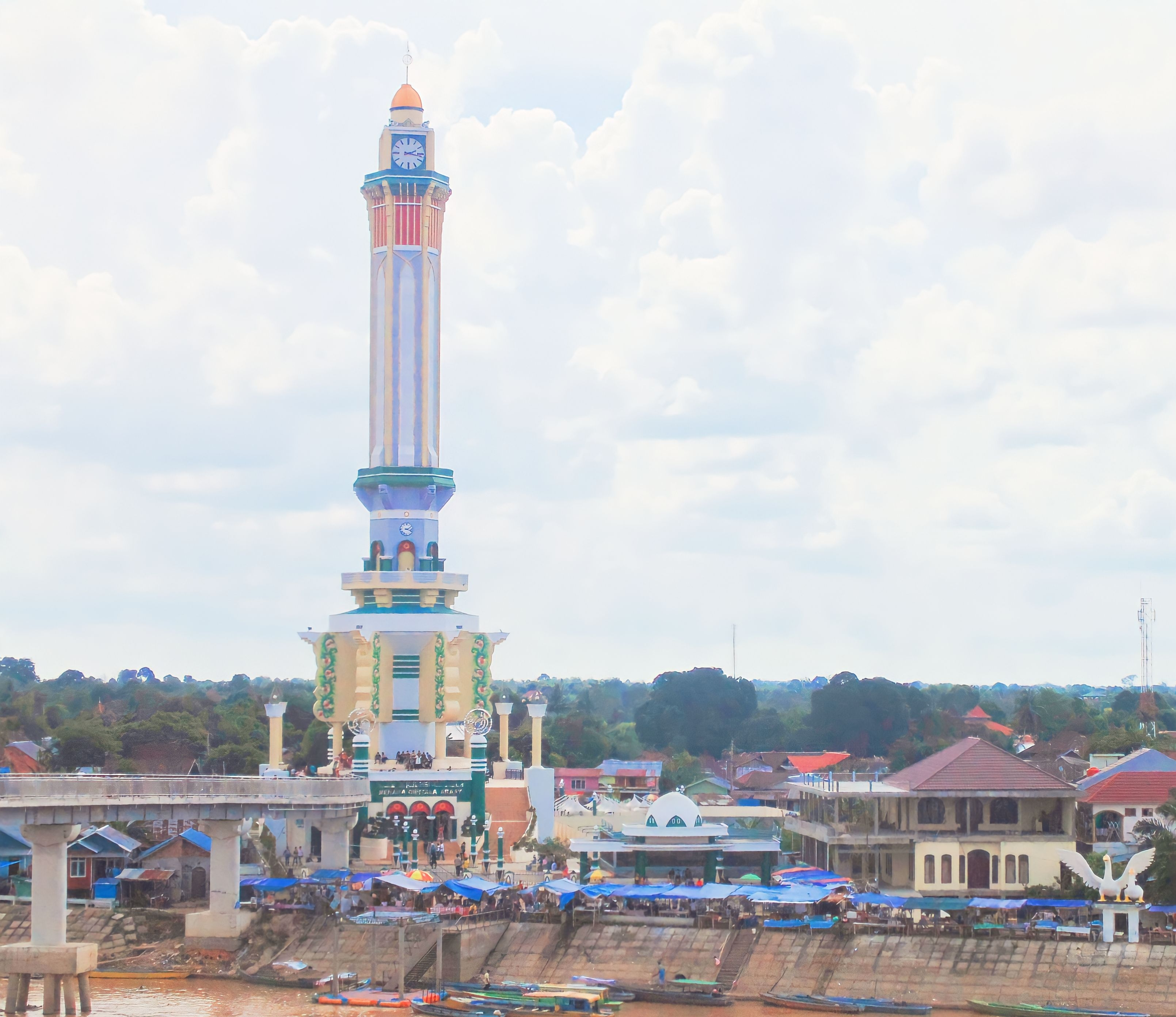
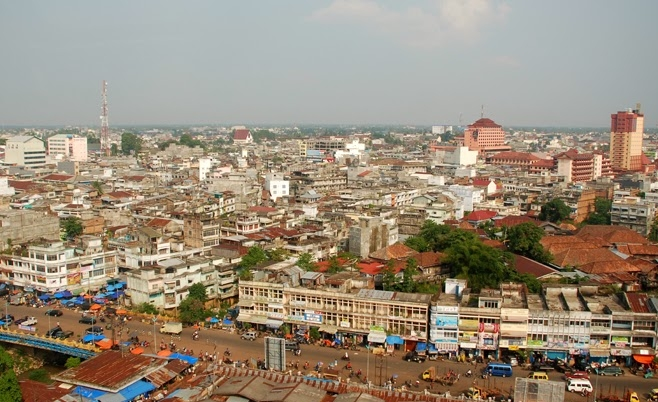
- Gentala Arasy Bridge; Siginjai Keris Monument; Al-Falah Grand Mosque; Gentala Arasy Tower; Skyline of Jambi City

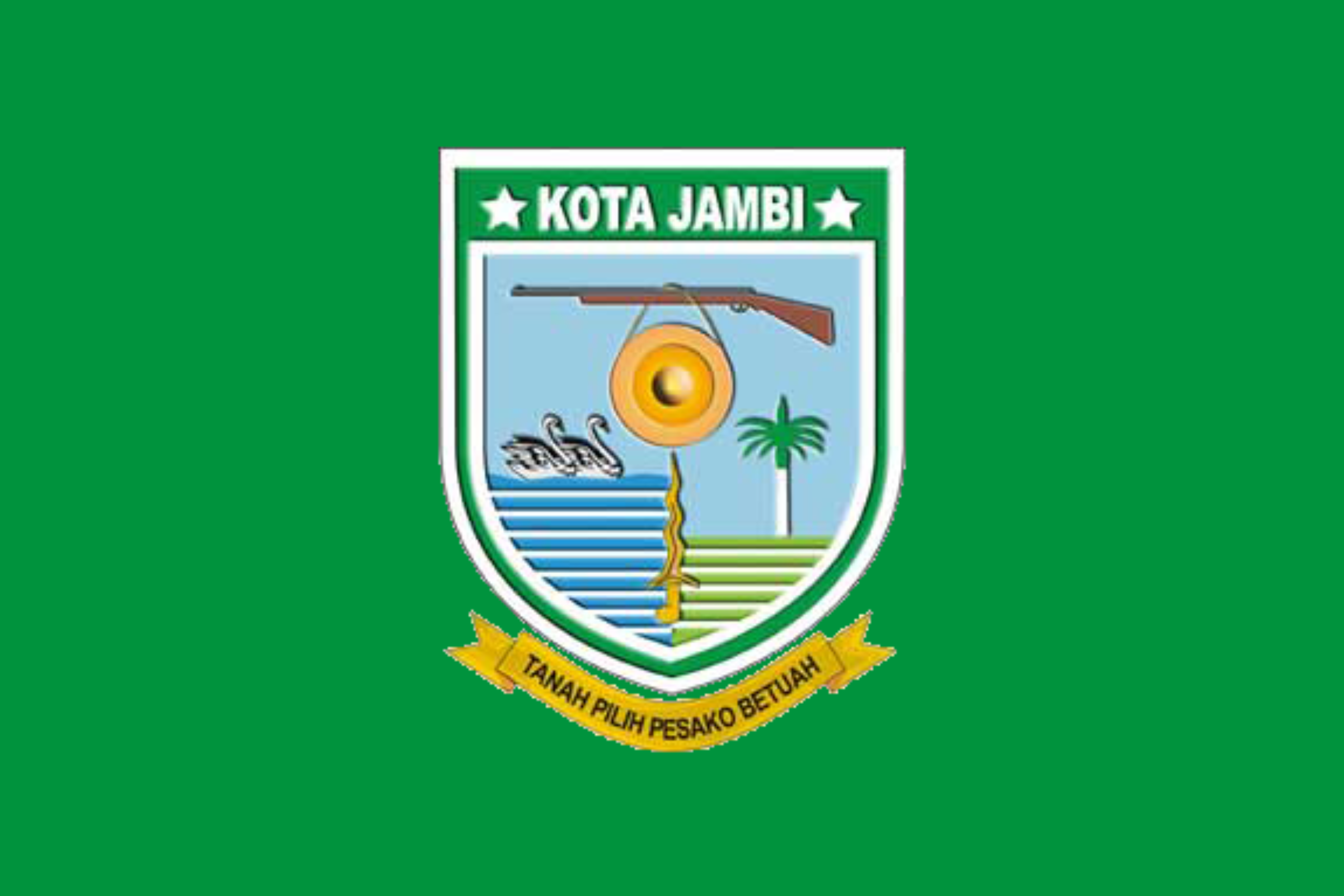
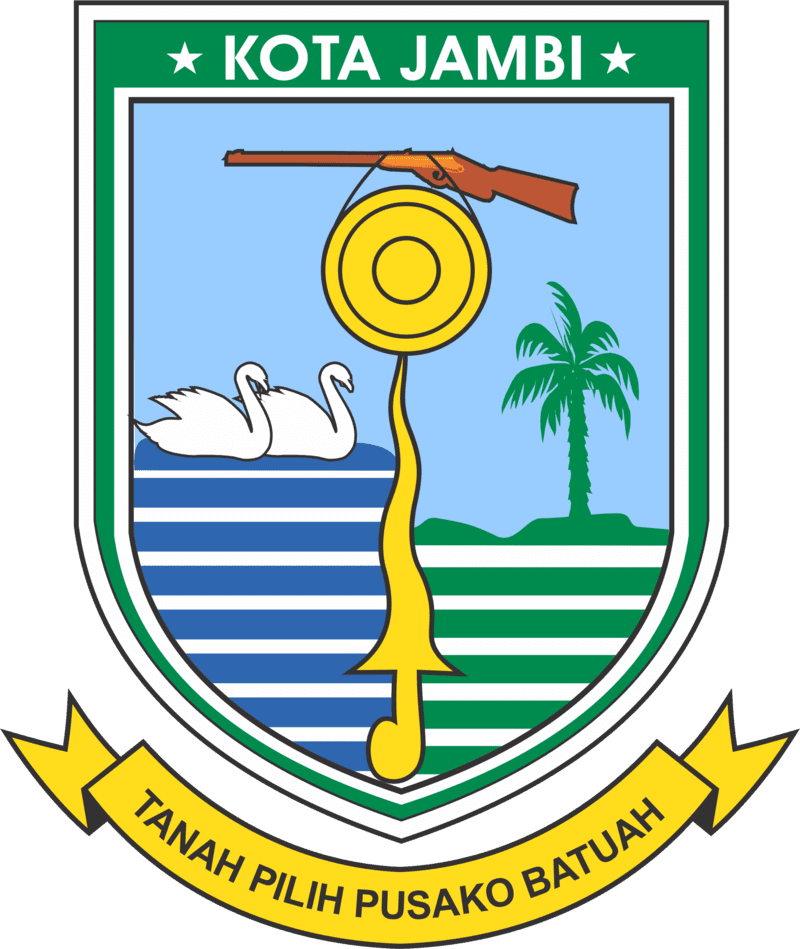
- Flag Coat of arms
- Motto(s): Tanah Pilih Pesako Betuah (Jambi Malay) "Chosen Land with Auspicious Heritage"
- Location within Jambi Province

- Location in Sumatra Location in Indonesia
- Coordinates: 1°35′24″S 103°36′36″E
- Country: Indonesia
- Province: Jambi
- Founded: 17 May 1401
- City Status: 1956

Government
  - Type: Mayor-council
  - Body: Jambi City Government
  - Mayor: Maulana (PAN)
  - Vice Mayor: Diza Hazra Aljosha
  - Legislature: Jambi City Regional House of Representatives (DPRD)

Area
  - Total: 169.89 km^{2} (65.59 sq mi)
- Elevation: 16 m (52 ft)

Population (mid 2025 estimate)
  - Total: 642,264
  - Density: 3,780.5/km^{2} (9,791.4/sq mi)
- Time zone: UTC+7 (Indonesia Western Time)
- Area code: (+62) 741
- Website: jambikota.go.id

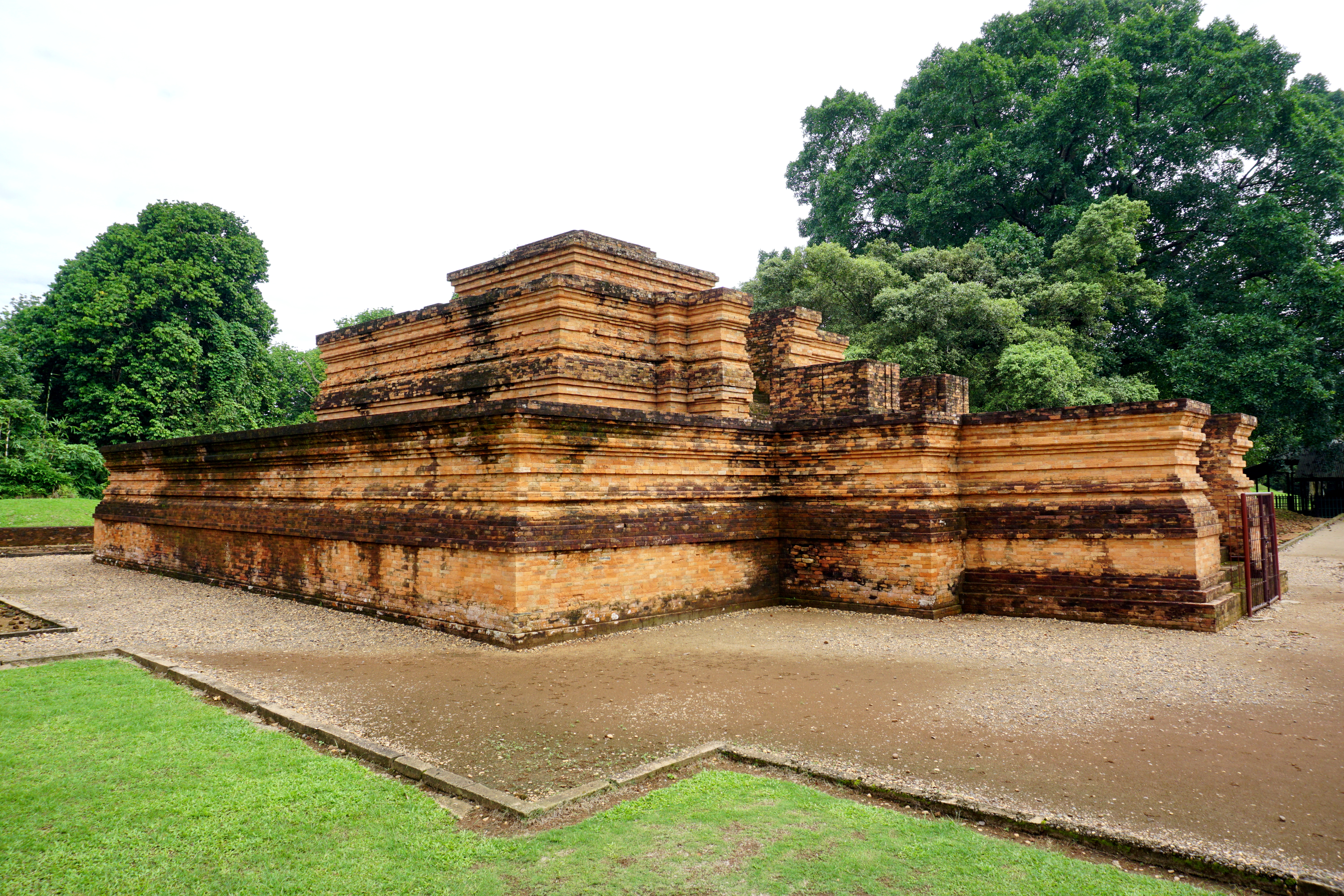
Muaro Jambi Temple Compounds

Jambi is the capital and largest city of the Indonesian province of Jambi. Located on the island of Sumatra, the city is a busy port on the Batang Hari River and an oil- and rubber-producing centre. The city is located 26 km (16 mi) from the ruins of Muaro Jambi Temple Compounds, an important city in the ancient Srivijaya kingdom.

Nearby towns and villages include Mendalo (5.1 nmi (9.4 km; 5.9 mi)), Kinati (4.1 nmi (7.6 km; 4.7 mi)), Padang (4.5 nmi (8.3 km; 5.2 mi)), Tanjung Johor (3.2 nmi (5.9 km; 3.7 mi)), Paal Merah (2.8 nmi (5.2 km; 3.2 mi)), and Muara Kumpe (3.6 nmi (6.7 km; 4.1 mi)). Jambi City itself is an enclave within Muaro Jambi Regency.

Jambi is served by the Sultan Thaha Airport.

== History ==
The history of the city of Jambi is inextricably linked with ancient Malay kingdoms and the maritime trade that flourished in this region for centuries. The city emerged as one of the key centres on the island of Sumatra, playing a vital role in the economic and cultural life of Southeast Asia.

The first settlements in the territory of modern Jambi appeared due to the existence of the ancient Melayu Kingdom, which is mentioned in Chinese chronicles as early as the 7th century. The Chinese Buddhist monk and traveller Yijing visited the state of Melayu during his journey to India in 671, which historians believe was located in this very region. Later, this territory became a crucial part of the powerful maritime empire of Srivijaya, which dominated the region from the 7th to the 13th centuries. Jambi, alongside Palembang, was one of the key hubs of this empire.

In the Srivijaya era, Jambi became a significant centre of Buddhism. Evidence of this is the Muaro Jambi temple complex, one of the largest in Southeast Asia, built between the 11th and 13th centuries. This complex served not only as a religious site but also as an educational centre. The city's economy depended entirely on river and maritime trade, making it a prosperous and cosmopolitan hub where different cultures and peoples met. The state of Tanah Pilih, the predecessor of modern Jambi, was founded on 28 May 1401, and became the Sultanate of Jambi in 1615, a wealthy centre for the trade of pepper and gold.

The Sultanate of Jambi entered into trade relations with the Dutch East India Company (VOC) in the mid 17th century, marking the beginning of European influence in the region. The Dutch intervened in 1858 in the internal affairs of the Sultanate, installing their own appointee and gaining control over the region's economy. After prolonged resistance, Dutch colonial troops finally conquer the Sultanate in 1904, killing the last Sultan, Thaha Syaifuddin, in battle.

Following the Japanese occupation of 1942 to 1945 during World War II, Jambi became part of the proclaimed independent Republic of Indonesia on 17 August 1945. Jambi City was denoted as the administrative capital of the Jambi Autonomic Area by the Governor of Sumatra on 17 May 1946. In 1956, Jambi city was given its city status, and eventually became the capital of Jambi Province on 6 January 1957.

== Geography ==
The total land area of Jambi city is 169.887 km^{2} (66 sq mi). Jambi city is located in the southwestern portion of the Sumatran Basin, a low-lying area in Eastern Sumatra with an altitude of 0 to 60m above sea level. A segment of the Batang Hari River, the longest river in Sumatra at 1,700 km (1,056 mi), flows through Jambi City.

== Demographics ==
Ethnicities of Jambi (city)
Ethnic group	Percentage
Jambi Malays	27.84%
Javanese	22.05%
Minangkabau	12.64%
Malays	11.47%
Chinese	6.82%
Batak	6.62%
Sundanese	4.47%
Bugis	2.03%
Others	6.06%

Jambi city is the most populated city in Jambi Province, with 606,200 inhabitants (17% of the province's population) living in this city in 2020; the official estimate as of mid 2025 was 642,264 (comprising 322,847 males and 319,417 females). The city is a very diverse and multi-ethnic, consisting of Jambi Malays (27.84%), Javanese (22.05%), Minangkabau (12.64%), Malays (11.47%), Chinese (6.82%), Batak (6.62%), Sundanese (4.47%), and Bugis (2.03%).

== Administrative districts ==
At the time of the 2010 Census, the city of Jambi was subdivided into eight administrative districts (kecamatan), but during the following decade, three additional districts were added by the splitting of existing districts - Alam Barajo, Danau Sipin and Paal Merah. The districts are listed below with their areas and their populations at the 2010 Census and 2020 Census, together with the official estimates as of mid 2025.< The table also includes the locations of the district administrative centres, the number of administrative villages in each district (all classed as urban kelurahan), and their postcodes.

Kode Wilayah	Name of District (kecamatan)	Area in km^{2}	Pop'n 2010 Census	Pop'n 2020 Census	Pop'n mid 2025 Estimate	Admin centre	No. of subdistricts	Post codes
15.71.07	Kota Baru	27.26	139,359	80,062	87,153	Paal Lima	5	36126 - 36128
15.71.09	Alam Baraja	36.06	^{(a)}	108,196	118,297	Bagan Pete	5	36125 - 36129
15.71.02	Jambi Selatan (South Jambi)	7.60	124,280	56,929	60,148	Pakuan Baru	5	36131 - 36139
15.71.11	Paal Merah	24.26	^{(a)}	105,906	115,062	Talang Bakung	5	36139 - 36148
15.71.08	Jelutung	7.62	60,544	59,442	60,944	Jelutung	7	36133 - 36137
15.71.04	Pasar Jambi	1.67	12,800	11,193	11,470	Pasar	4	36111 - 36134
15.71.01	Telanaipura	20.33	92,366	49,212	50,530	Telanai Pura	6	36122 - 36129
15.71.10	Danau Sipin	7.28	^{(a)}	43,375	44,515	Murni	5	36121 - 36129
15.71.06	Danau Teluk	13.44	11,824	12,822	13,152	Olak Kemang	5	36261 - 36265
15.71.05	Pelayangan	10.69	12,861	12,939	13,266	Ulu Gedong	6	36251 - 36256
15.71.03	Jambi Timur (East Jambi)	13.68	77,823	66,124	67,727	Tanjung Pinang	9	36141 - 36149
	Totals	169.89	531,857	606,200	642,264	Kota Baru	62	

Note: (a) the 2010 populations of these new districts are included with the figure for the district from which they were cut.

=== Climate ===
Jambi has a tropical rainforest climate (Af) according to the Köppen climate classification, with a minimum temperature of 22 to 23 °C (72 to 73 °F) and a maximum temperature of 30 to 32 °C (86 to 90 °F). The level of humidity ranges from 82 to 28%. The annual rainfall of Jambi City is 2,296.1 mm (90.4 in), with the rainy season lasting from October to March with 20 rainy days a month. The dry season lasts from April to September with an average of 16 rainy days a month.

Climate data for Jambi (Sultan Thaha Syaifuddin Airport) (1991–2020 normals)
Month	Jan	Feb	Mar	Apr	May	Jun	Jul	Aug	Sep	Oct	Nov	Dec	Year
Mean daily maximum °C (°F)	30.9 (87.6)	31.4 (88.5)	32.0 (89.6)	32.5 (90.5)	32.5 (90.5)	32.3 (90.1)	32.1 (89.8)	32.3 (90.1)	32.6 (90.7)	32.3 (90.1)	31.9 (89.4)	31.3 (88.3)	32.0 (89.6)
Daily mean °C (°F)	26.7 (80.1)	26.8 (80.2)	27.1 (80.8)	27.2 (81.0)	27.5 (81.5)	27.3 (81.1)	27.1 (80.8)	27.2 (81.0)	27.2 (81.0)	27.1 (80.8)	26.9 (80.4)	26.8 (80.2)	27.1 (80.7)
Mean daily minimum °C (°F)	23.4 (74.1)	23.6 (74.5)	23.4 (74.1)	23.8 (74.8)	23.9 (75.0)	23.6 (74.5)	23.1 (73.6)	23.0 (73.4)	23.1 (73.6)	23.2 (73.8)	23.3 (73.9)	23.6 (74.5)	23.4 (74.1)
Average precipitation mm (inches)	162.4 (6.39)	179.5 (7.07)	228.9 (9.01)	241.9 (9.52)	161.0 (6.34)	98.9 (3.89)	131.7 (5.19)	131.3 (5.17)	123.8 (4.87)	185.1 (7.29)	230.7 (9.08)	236.5 (9.31)	2,111.7 (83.13)
Average precipitation days (≥ 1.0 mm)	12.8	10.7	13.5	14.3	11.3	7.4	8.8	8.0	8.4	12.3	14.1	14.6	136.2
Mean monthly sunshine hours	101.8	103.7	114.9	130.7	149.0	159.1	171.6	164.0	128.4	114.5	107.4	98.9	1,544
Source 1: World Meteorological Organization (sun)
Source 2: Starlings Roost Weather

== Transportation ==
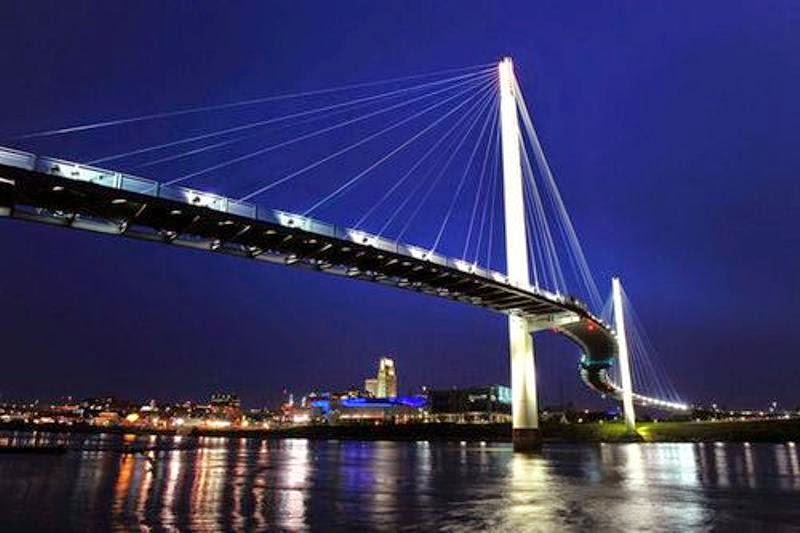
Gentala Arasy pedestrian bridge

The city is served by Sultan Thaha Airport, which has connections to Jakarta, Batam, Palembang, Medan, Bengkulu, Bandar Lampung, and Pekanbaru. Trans-Sumatran Highway crosses the city. Jambi Port is located over the Batang Hari River. Public transportation includes angkot and ojek. Ride-sharing services Grab and Gojek are also available.

== Education ==
Ma'had Ubay bin Kaab is a Sunni Islamic boarding school located in Jambi.

== Media ==
The oldest newspaper in the Jambi region is Jambi Independent, part of Jawa Pos Group. Several other newspapers such as Tribun Jambi, Jambi Ekspres and Metro Jambi are also available.

The privately owned Jek TV and Jambi TV are the local TV stations based in Jambi. The public TVRI Jambi also covers the city.

== Twin towns – sister cities ==
Jambi City is twinned with:

- Kupang, Indonesia
- (Timor-Leste) Ermera, East Timor
- (Timor-Leste) Ainaro, East Timor

== Notable people ==
The city was the birthplace of sex offender Reynhard Sinaga (born 19 February 1983), described by the UK Crown Prosecution Service as "the most prolific rapist in British legal history".
