= Clermont Cemetery =

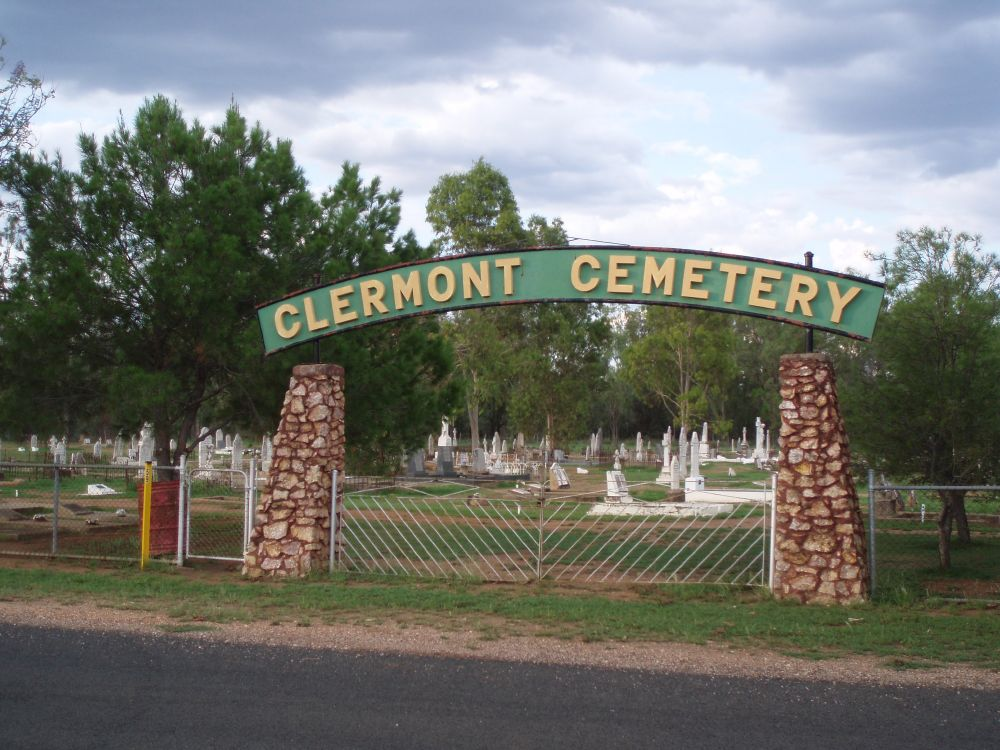
- Clermont Cemetery, 2007

- Location within Queensland Location within Australia
- 22.8103°S 147.6467°E
- Location: Cemetery Road, Clermont, Isaac Region, Queensland, Australia

History
- Built: 1866

Queensland Heritage Register
- Official name: Clermont Cemetery
- Type: state heritage (landscape, built)
- Designated: 6 August 2010
- Reference no.: 602756
- Significant period: 1868–

Clermont Cemetery is a heritage-listed cemetery at Cemetery Road, Clermont, Isaac Region, Queensland, Australia. It was established in 1866. It was added to the Queensland Heritage Register on 6 August 2010.

== History ==
Clermont Cemetery was established in 1866 to service the early Queensland mining town of Clermont in Central Queensland. The place has functioned as Clermont's only public cemetery since the town's inception in the 1860s and it contains graves dating to this period. In December 1916 Clermont experienced the greatest recorded loss of life during a flood in Queensland, and the Clermont Cemetery contains the graves of at least 36 of the flood victims.

=== Establishment of Clermont ===
Clermont, in the Peak Downs area of the former Leichhardt Pastoral District, was one of the earliest inland towns established in central Queensland. Pastoralists took up land in the area in the early 1850s but the town of Clermont owes its existence to the discovery of alluvial gold near Hood's Lagoon c. 1861. With the resultant rush of miners to the site a tent town was established and a licensed hotel, the Diggers' Retreat, was opened in 1862. In late 1863 the area around the lagoon was surveyed as the town of Clermont, and in December that year the town was appointed a place for holding Courts of Petty Sessions. In 1863 the Peak Downs Copper Company opened the first copper mine in Queensland – a rich copper lode about five kilometres south of Clermont – and the township of Copperfield developed around the mine.

The progress of the Clermont-Copperfield district was widely reported in colonial Queensland. Charles Buzacott established the Peak Downs Telegram and Queensland Mining Record at Clermont in 1864 and in 1865 Pugh's Almanac identified Clermont as "one of the most promising townships in the interior", with a bank, hospital, court-house, newspaper office, workshops, stores, three hotels and several boarding houses. In January 1865 the Clermont Electoral District was proclaimed and in November that year the township of Clermont and the adjacent mining district was proclaimed as the Provisional Council District of Clermont – the first under the District Councils Act of 1864. In mid-1866 the residents of Clermont petitioned for municipal status which resulted in the proclamation of the combined municipality of Clermont and Copperfield in January 1867. At the time of the Queensland census of 1868, Clermont, with a population of 821, was the ninth most populous town in the colony, after Brisbane, Rockhampton, Ipswich, Maryborough, Toowoomba, Warwick, Dalby and Bowen, and had a greater population than Drayton (807), Gayndah (746), Roma (506), Gladstone (377), Townsville (346), Mackay (341), Allora (292), Leyburn (279) and Springsure (277).

In the early years Clermont was sustained by gold and copper mining and the surrounding pastoral industry. However, by the time Clermont and Copperfield each gained municipal status in May 1872, payable alluvial gold in the district was declining. The town survived largely due to the completion in 1884 of a branch railway linking Clermont to Emerald and Rockhampton. From the 1890s, coal at Blair Athol replaced gold and copper as the principal mining interest in the district. By the late twentieth century, Clermont had evolved into a medium-sized town serving coal mines and agricultural holdings in the area.

=== Clermont Cemetery ===
In late 1865 the colonial government approved a grant of 10 acres (4.0 ha) for a cemetery at Clermont, although when surveyor Charles Frederick Gregory made his survey early in 1866 he included a cemetery extension, bringing the total area to 15 acres (6.1 ha) 2 roods (22,000 sq ft; 2,000 m^{2}). In the tradition of locating public cemeteries on the outskirts of a town, the Clermont cemetery reserve was located on the banks of Sandy Creek about one kilometre north-east of the township. It was in use by April 1866 when the town buried one of its first residents, Dr WS Smith, who had been practising in the town for nearly four years. The earliest registered burial in the cemetery was that of a two-year-old child, David Kilpatrick, who was interred in 1867. Around 20 per cent of over 3,000 known burials in the cemetery pre-date 1900.

Under the Cemetery Act of 1865, which provided for the regulation of cemeteries throughout Queensland, trustees for the Clermont Cemetery were appointed in August 1868. They represented the Church of England, Roman Catholic, Wesleyan and Presbyterian denominations. Burials for all Christian denominations and non-Christians were received in public cemeteries, which usually were laid out in denominational sections.

Clermont Cemetery is among the earlier surviving public cemeteries in central Queensland, others being located at St Lawrence (earliest burial 1857), South Rockhampton Cemetery (established 1860), Marlborough (earliest burial 1860) and Nebo (earliest burial 1866).

Early cemeteries are important records of the pattern of non-indigenous settlement in Queensland. The Clermont Cemetery is particularly important for its association with early mining in Queensland. New goldfields typically attracted fortune seekers from all over the world and the birthplaces of those buried in the Clermont Cemetery in the nineteenth century reflected the varied origins of the town's inhabitants during the peak period of mining activity in the area. Birthplaces other than Australia and the British Isles included: China (most numerous), Germany, Denmark, Sweden, Greece, France, and single burials each of an Austrian, Swiss, South Sea Islander, Japanese, Canadian and an American. Many of these nationalities, and others, are represented also in later graves.

Despite the renewal of trustees in 1878, by the mid-1880s the cemetery had fallen into disrepair: According to the Brisbane Courier on 26 March 1886:

"The Clermont cemetery is one of those institutions which are left to manage themselves as best they may. God's Acre is all untidy and uncared for; the fences are going to ruin, and the management seems almost entirely to rest upon an irresponsible undertaker and sexton."

In 1887 the cemetery area was expanded and proclaimed as a permanent reserve of 25 acres (10 ha) for cemetery purposes. A late 1886 survey plan shows the cemetery occupying the south-western corner of the reserve, closest to the town and fronting Cemetery Road, and enclosed with a two-rail timber fence. Another two-rail fence separated the southern third of the reserve from the remainder, which was largely unimproved.

By 1901 a substantial lychgate-cum-shelter shed had been constructed at the main entrance off Cemetery Road, in the south-western corner of the cemetery reserve. This was a timber-framed structure, three or four bays in length, open-sided, with a gabled roof.

Historically during the summer months, central and north Queensland has been prone to extreme weather conditions and periods of heavy rain associated with tropical lows and cyclones which have caused major damage and loss of life. In addition to the destruction caused by high winds, torrential rain created by degenerating cyclones has caused rapid flooding of rivers and creeks, inundating large areas of land with fast flowing water.

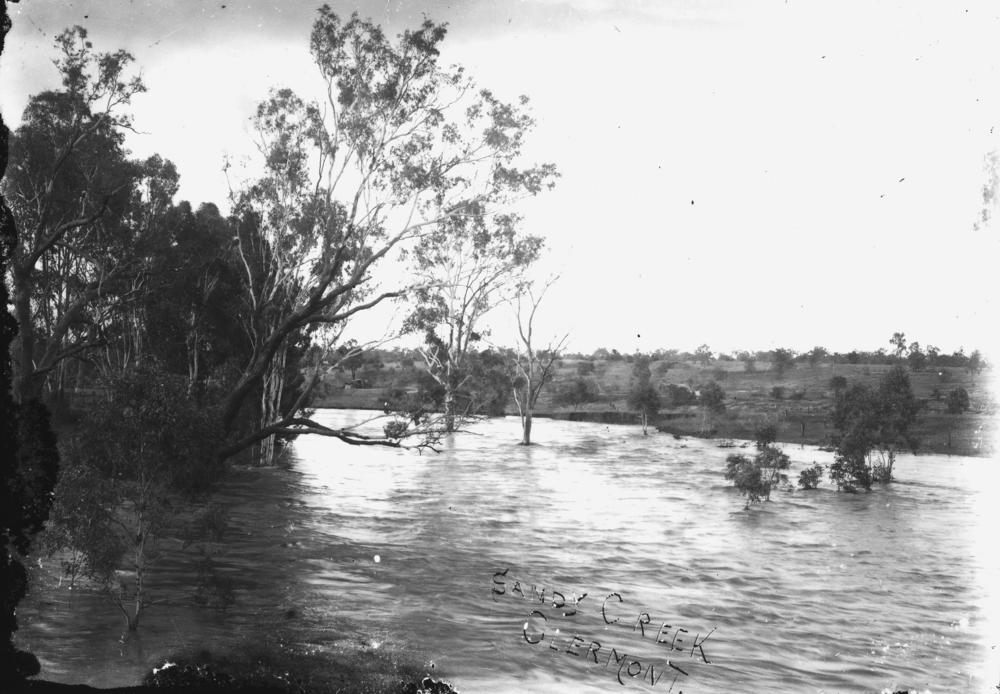
Sandy Creek, Clermont, in flood

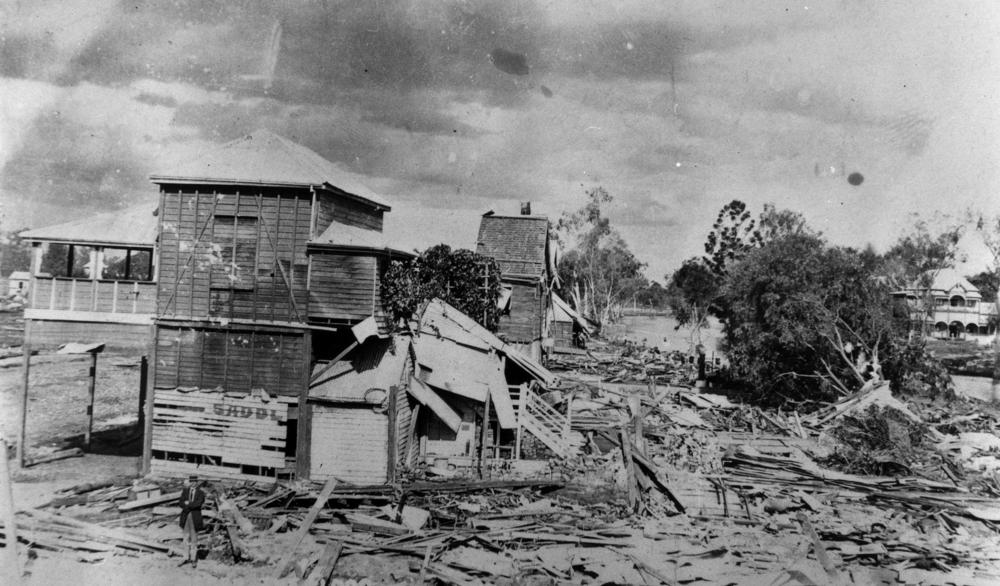
Flood damaged houses at Clermont, 1916

Clermont had long experience of damaging floods – such as that of February 1870, when the town was inundated to a depth of 4 to 5 feet (1.2 to 1.5 m) and four persons were drowned (15 in the wider district) – but nothing on the scale of the flood of late December 1916. During the morning of 27 December 1916 a cyclone crossed the coast between Bowen and Mackay bringing torrential rain and high wind. By 4.00am on 28 December it was located about 35 miles (56 km) north-west of Clermont. Heavy rain fell into the small catchments of Sandy and Wolfang creeks. An accurate determination of rainfall was impossible as rain gauges overflowed but it was estimated that up to 30 inches (760 mm) of rain fell in the area during the period of the storm which lasted around 18 hours.

An eyewitness described the "wall of water" that flowed rapidly down the creeks sweeping away the low-lying areas of the town of Clermont and inundating the town cemetery beside the river. In the wake of the flood the Adelaide Advertiser (9 January 1917) reported:

"The cemetery is merely a mass of holes. The coffins have been washed out and carried downstream, and the headstones have been wrecked, or where they were of wood have been borne long distances."

The sexton's house was washed away and the sexton was drowned.

It is estimated that the river flats were submerged under 12 to 14 feet (3.7 to 4.3 m) of fast-flowing water. People sought refuge on roofs and in ceilings but the debris-laden flood waters destroyed many houses and lifted others from their stumps to be carried downstream. Other people were drowned in the flood waters while attempting to escape to higher ground. Over 60 people died, with the disaster reported throughout the country and in the London Times.

Many flood victims were buried close to where they were found, but at least 36 are buried in the Clermont Cemetery. All except one of these were buried within three days of the disaster. The burials included entire families of up to seven persons, with the age of victims ranging from two to 70 years. Most were interred in a mass grave located to the east of the earlier burials.

A meeting of surviving residents soon after the flood resolved to move the town from the flats to higher ground close by. The government enacted special legislation, the Clermont Flood Relief Act 1917, to enable the town to re-establish at the new site. Some buildings were moved to the new location by traction engine.

Descendants of the flood victims still live in Clermont. In 1991, a memorial to the victims was erected in the cemetery by the Lioness Club of Clermont, on the site of the mass grave. A white cross shows the approximate height of the flood waters. Another memorial is located at the site of the original township. The cemetery is now managed by the Isaac Regional Council and remains the main public burial ground for Clermont.

== Description ==
Clermont Cemetery occupies the southern portion of a roughly triangular, ten hectare block of land located approximately two kilometres north of the town centre of Clermont in central Queensland. Access to the cemetery is via several entrance gates off Cemetery Road, which runs along the southern boundary. Perpendicular to this is the eastern boundary, which lies adjacent to Old Showground Road and privately owned land. The third boundary is formed by Sandy Creek, which crosses from the south-west to the north-east corner of the property. The northern portion of the site, separated from the cemetery by a fence line running east–west, is not in use and remains covered by what appear to be native trees. This portion of the site is not included within the heritage register boundary.

Graves within the cemetery are arranged in a rectangular grid layout divided by dirt or gravel driveways and walkways, with headstones facing toward the east. The earliest graves are located towards the western end of the site, while the most recent burials and a lawn cemetery are found at the eastern end. Identified burials date from 1867 to the present, with a variety of Victorian, Edwardian and twentieth century monument styles featured throughout.

The graves associated with the 1916 flood are located within the older, western half of the cemetery that lies closest to Sandy Creek. In this area, surviving headstones from pre-1916 are made from sandstone, marble and cast iron, many of them substantial headstones of good quality design and craftsmanship.

The mass grave containing the victims of the flood is enclosed by a low fence, made from tubular steel posts with chain slung between them. Two marked grave plots containing flood victims are also enclosed by the fence. One belongs to Richard Hooper. The inscription states he "was drowned in the great flood of Clermont". The grave also contains his wife Elizabeth Jane Hooper who died in 1956 aged 85. It consists of a marble plaque attached to a granite headstone, with a low concrete grave kerb surrounding a concrete slab covered in black and white tiles. Four immortelles sit on top of the slab and a marble plaque with the words "Mother Father" are attached to the kerb at the foot of the grave. The other marked grave, located further to the south, has a concrete headstone with marble plaque, concrete grave kerb and gravel infill. The three names listed on this plaque are: John Thomas Wicks, Peter Olsson and Evelyn Olsson. The inscription states that they "were drowned in the flood of Dec 1916".

A memorial dated 1991 is also located within the fenced enclosure. It comprises a granite block on a concrete base with small bronze plaques, naming individuals and family groups who lost their lives in the 1916 flood, attached to the eastern face. A larger plaque in the centre bears the words: "ERECTED BY LIONESS CLUB ON 13. 4. 1991 IN MEMORY OF KNOWN VICTIMS OF DEC. 1916 FLOOD". Next to the granite memorial on the right hand side is a tall timber post, painted white, with a small timber cross member marking the presumed level of the flood. Words painted on this cross member are: "1916 FLOOD LEVEL, approximately".

Other flood victims' graves are found in the eastern half of the cemetery. A memorial to 34 year old Margaret Davidson (née Healy) was erected by her siblings and consists of a marble angel on top of a marble pedestal. The grave itself is surrounded by iron fencing, painted white. Another monument is a large marble Celtic cross bearing the names of five members of the Carsten family. The inscription states that it was erected "In loving memory of my dearly beloved wife, little son, mother and sisters who lost their lives in the flood at Clermont, 28 Dec. 1916". The names listed are those of Maud Margaret Carsten (aged 30), Simon Henry Carsten (14 months), Kate Carsten (50), and Gretta and Eva Mary Carsten (22 and 26 respectively).

Throughout the rest of the cemetery, a wide variety of monumental forms are found including sarcophagi, obelisks and columns. Headstones range from simple upright slabs to those featuring elaborate ornamentation such as angels, cherubs, bibles, urns, crosses and broken columns. Materials used include marble, sandstone, iron, granite and concrete. Of note are some cast iron monuments with filigree iron lacework borders. Included amongst the early twentieth century monuments is the work of Brisbane monumental masons AL Petrie and J Petrie and Sons, and A & G Ballantine of Melbourne. J Simmonds of Brisbane is identified on an 1894 headstone.

The cemetery contains two Commonwealth war graves, which are of an Australian Imperial Force Sergeant of World War I (Row U, Grave 5), and a Royal Australian Air Force Leading Aircraftman of World War II (Section K, Grave 6).

Monuments from the mid to late 20th century are predominantly of the slab and desk type, made from materials such as concrete, granite and sandstone with some marble features and plaques. Many grave surrounds and concrete slabs are clad in ceramic tiles.

The lawn cemetery consists of wide, rectangular strips of ground surrounded by concrete kerbing, one of which features a row of flowering shrubs or small trees down the centre. Brass plaques marking individual graves are either set into concrete at ground level or attached to a continuous, inclined concrete strip.

The main entrance archway, located towards the centre of the southern boundary fence, features an arched metal sign supported by tubular metal posts on top of stone pylons and reading "CLERMONT CEMETERY".

The western and northern sides of the cemetery are screened by mature trees growing beyond the boundaries. A row of trees including Jacarandas (Jacaranda mimosifolia) planted along Cemetery Road have a partial screening effect yet still allows views into the cemetery. A scattering of other stand-alone trees are also found growing within the cemetery. Fencing along the front boundary is made with metal post and cyclone wire and with three vehicular and four pedestrian gates spaced along its length. This fence is not considered to be of cultural heritage significance. A number of sheds within the cemetery reserve are recent and are not of cultural heritage significance. Views over surrounding countryside and farmland are obtained to the east and south of the cemetery. Through trees along the western boundary are views towards Sandy Creek and the countryside beyond.

== Heritage listing ==
Clermont Cemetery was listed on the Queensland Heritage Register on 6 August 2010 having satisfied the following criteria.

The place is important in demonstrating the evolution or pattern of Queensland's history.

Clermont Cemetery, established in 1866 and still in use, is an early public burial ground in central Queensland. It is associated with the establishment of Clermont as one of Queensland's earliest mining towns; is important in demonstrating the wide ethnic diversity of an early Queensland mining community; and is an important source of unique historical information about a community that has serviced a mining, pastoral and agricultural district since the 1860s.

The place is important for its association with the great flood of December 1916 which swept away the lower areas of Clermont with the loss of over 60 lives – the worst flood in terms of loss of life in Queensland's history – and which brought about the relocation of the town from the flats around the Clermont Lagoon to higher ground nearby. At least 36 of the flood victims were buried in the Clermont Cemetery, most in a mass grave, providing emotive evidence of the human cost of Queensland's harsh climatic conditions. The cemetery itself was flooded and a marker at the mass grave shows the depth of the flood waters.

The place is important because of its aesthetic significance.

Clermont Cemetery is important for the aesthetic values generated by the evocativeness of the monuments and memorials, particularly those associated with the 1916 flood victims; and by the workmanship displayed in many of the early monuments, many of which were crafted in other centres and transported to Clermont.
