= Lubukrusa =

Village in Jambi Province, Indonesia

- Location in Indonesia
- Coordinates: 1°34′S 103°21′E
- Country: Indonesia
- Province: Jambi Province
- Regency: Batang Hari Regency

Lubukrusa is a village in the Batang Hari Regency in the Jambi Province of Sumatra, Indonesia.

Nearby towns and villages include Merlung (26.2 nm), Pematangpayung (28.0 nm), Selat (6.1 nm), Teluk(6.7 nm) and Kuap (1.4 nm) .
