= Irlam's Ant Bed Building =

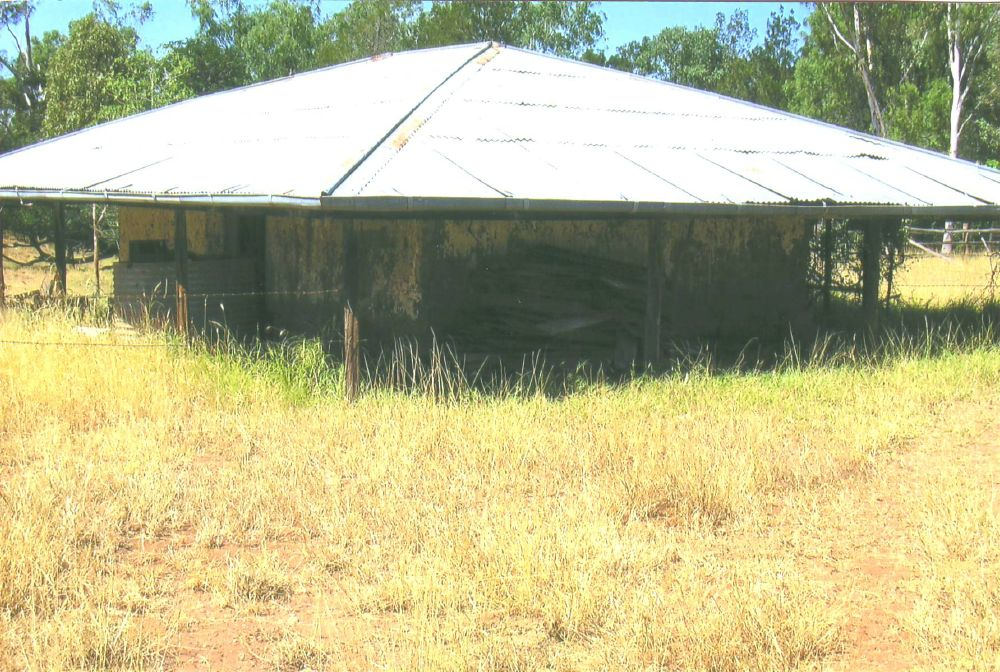
- Irlam's Ant Bed Building

- Location within Queensland Location within Australia
- 22.8175°S 147.4761°E
- Location: Clermont-Alpha Road, Clermont, Isaac Region, Queensland, Australia

History
- Built: 1870s

Queensland Heritage Register
- Official name: Irlam's Ant Bed Building (former), Oakey Farm
- Type: state heritage (built)
- Designated: 14 August 2008
- Reference no.: 602010
- Significant period: 1870s onwards
- Builders: George Irlam

Irlam's Ant Bed Building is a heritage-listed former homestead and hotel at Clermont-Alpha Road, Clermont, Isaac Region, Queensland, Australia. It was built in 1870s by George Irlam. It is also known as Oaky (Oakey) Farm. It was added to the Queensland Heritage Register on 14 August 2008.

== History ==
The ant bed building at Oaky (Oakey) Creek was associated with a farmhouse-cum-wayside inn established by George Irlam c. 1870 on the Clermont-Alpha Road, along the route to Aramac. At the inn, travellers could break their journey and sample the farm's home-grown produce.

The Clermont district was opened to European settlement after Ludwig Leichhardt, who had explored the area in 1844, reported on its potential for pastoralists, agriculturists and miners. In the early 1850s the Archer brothers were the first pastoralists to take up land in the area and they were soon followed by other squatters and by fossickers in search of gold, coal and other minerals.

The discovery of gold near Hood's Lagoon (soon known as Diggings Lagoon) in the early 1860s paved the way for a rush to the district. A nearby settlement was surveyed in 1863 as the town of Clermont. Homesteads and townships west of Clermont were established rapidly and the bush tracks blazed by the carriers, teamsters, farmers, graziers and miners who needed a comprehensive network of roads for transporting wool, gold, copper and other produce to coastal ports, became well travelled routes. The Clermont to Aramac route via Oaky Creek was established in 1863 and following the 1866 opening of a post office at Clermont, weekly mail services to settlers in outlying areas commenced along this track.

The disruption to Aboriginal life was not welcomed by the traditional owners of the area – the Kairis (Khararyas), Wangans and Jagalingus (Jangga). Violent frontier conflict had commenced by 1861 and continued through the 1860s and into the early 1870s.

As the frontier conflict subsided, Cobb & Co Coaches established a network of coach routes from Rockhampton to the western districts in the early 1870s. From 1878 to 1884 the firm ran a regular weekly coach between Copperfield (Clermont) and Aramac.

George Irlam had acquired various interests in the district west of Clermont by the late 1860s. He held a license for the Lord Nelson Hotel at Oaky Creek from 1869 to 1876 and by January 1871 had purchased all the Red Rock Valley cattle.

In 1872 Irlam selected 160 acres (65 ha) (portion 44, now known as Oaky Farm) at Oaky Creek, about 20 kilometres (12 mi) west of Clermont along the Alpha road. An 1873 survey plan of Irlam's selection shows an established house, stockyard, garden and cultivation area on the flat of Oaky Creek. A later survey plan of the area, dated July 1879, identifies an inn in the approximate location of the farm house identified on the 1873 plan. In 1876–1877 there was no license issued for Irlam's Lord Nelson Hotel at Oaky Creek, but he did take out a license for the Oaky Creek Hotel. Given that Oaky Creek is a small district, and that an inn in this area would need to be located on the main Clermont to Aramac route to be viable, it is highly likely that the Oakey Creek Hotel was the inn identified on the 1879 plan. Whether it was earlier known as the Lord Nelson Hotel, established in the late 1860s, has not been confirmed.

When Irlam made application in July 1877 for a deed of grant for his selection, he claimed to have been residing continuously on the property since 22 February 1872 (the time of official selection). The improvements comprised a dwelling house, stock yards, and 16 acres (6.5 ha) under cultivation. Irlam made no mention of conducting an inn or hotel on the property. However, it appears that the dwelling on Irlam's selection fulfilled the dual function of farmhouse and inn, serving as a refreshment stop for travellers along the Clermont to Aramac route. Being comparatively close to Clermont (20 kilometres (12 mi) distant), the demand for overnight accommodation was limited and Cobb & Co coaches did not change horses at Oaky Creek.

As soon as Irlam's conditions of selection for portion 44 had been fulfilled in 1877, he transferred the license to the Oakey Creek Hotel to James Nicholls, who in turn transferred it to J Williams in 1879. There is no license recorded for the period 1881 to 1883, but Charles Cook held the license briefly in 1884.

According to local historian Dan O'Donnell, by 1878 Irlam's hotel was well known to travellers along the Clermont to Aramac route, for the fresh fruit grown in the adjacent orchard, which contained both tropical and temperate fruit trees including lemons, apples, peaches and bananas. A dairy (likely the surviving ant bed building on Oaky Farm) was located near to the road and to the hotel.

Australian architectural historian Dr Miles Lewis has recorded the nineteenth century use of crushed anthill clay, (known locally as ant bed), for adobe, cob, pise de terre, earthen flooring and later the surfacing of tennis courts. Ant bed appears to have been used mainly in rural areas either due to an absence of other materials, or for its adhesive and/or insulating properties. Few ant bed structures are known to survive in Queensland.

In 1884 a branch line was opened from the Central Western railway line to Clermont, but coaches, carriers and travellers continued to use the Clermont to Aramac route because the rail service beyond Clermont continued north to Blair Athol, leaving western districts dependent upon traditional coach services and independent carriers. Despite this sustained use, no license for a hotel at Oaky Creek was issued after 1884.

In 1891 title to portion 44 was transferred to John Gustav Finger, who worked the property as a grazing farm until his death in 1915. In 1918 his sons August Henry and Louis Rudolph gained title to the farm, which still comprised 160 acres (65 ha). The brothers expanded the yards for working cattle, which included construction of a loading ramp and dip. Louis Finger bought his brother's share in the property c. 1919.

Thomas and Albert James purchased the property in 1957 and continued to work it as a grazing farm. They moved another house to the site around this time, and the early dwelling house (a timber slab structure) was used by Tom James as a work shed for his saddle and leather making business. The ant bed building was used for storage. Tom resided at the property until his death in 1996.

== Description ==
Irlam's former farmhouse/inn is located at Oaky Creek along the Clermont-Alpha Road. The place contains an 1870s building constructed of rammed earth (pise de terre) mixed with ant bed. This building is located within a fenced house yard 48 metres (157 ft) long and approximately 24 metres (79 ft) wide, abutting the south-east side of the road.

=== Ant Bed Building ===
The ant bed building is situated in the north-east corner of the house yard, approximately 5.5 metres (18 ft) from the fence line, and has a northerly aspect. It is a single-storeyed, one-roomed structure, approximately 7 by 7.5 metres (23 by 25 ft), with walls approximately 41 centimetres (16 in) thick of rammed earth mixed with ant bed, resting on a base of brick coursing. The building has a shallow-pitched, hipped roof of corrugated iron, which extends beyond the exterior walls as a 2-metre (6 ft 7 in) wide overhang to verandahs on all sides. This is supported on timber posts.

Adjoining the southern verandah is a wire and timber-framed enclosure, with grape vines growing through it, measuring approximately 3 by 6.5 metres (9.8 by 21.3 ft).

It appears that each of the rammed earth walls originally had a base of coursed bricks, laid brick-on-edge. Much of this brick work either has fallen out or has been removed. (Some loose bricks are scattered around the building, likely sourced from the missing wall coursing.) The rammed earth walls have been undermined by the actions of animals and insects, with some erosion possibly being advanced by ground moisture. The western wall has suffered the least degradation. Some cracking of the walls has occurred on all sides due to subsidence and expansion/contraction. All the external walls have been lime-washed at some period. Both the northern (front) and southern walls of the building have a centrally positioned timber doorframe and door of timber boards. There is a small, centrally positioned, timber-framed window opening (unglazed) in the eastern wall, but no opening in the western wall.

Internally, sawn timber boards line the upper walls. The timber roof structure probably dates to the 1930s, when the shingles were replaced by corrugated iron. The floor of the building is earth on shale. There is no indication of a below-ground cellar.

=== The house yard ===
Apart from the ant bed building, the attached timber and wire trellis, and the brick scatter surrounding the ant bed building, the remaining structures within the house yard do not form part of the heritage listing.

== Heritage listing ==
Irlam's Ant Bed Building was listed on the Queensland Heritage Register on 14 August 2008 having satisfied the following criteria.

The place is important in demonstrating the evolution or pattern of Queensland's history.

The ant bed building at George Irlam's former farmhouse/inn, established in the 1870s at Oaky Creek about 20 kilometres (12 mi) west of Clermont, is important in demonstrating the pattern of early non-indigenous settlement in the central highlands of Queensland. During the 1870s the building was associated with the functioning of the place as both a wayside inn and a selection farmhouse. The combination of commercial, residential and agricultural functions was illustrative of the frontier nature of early non-indigenous settlement in rural Queensland. The ant bed building is significant for its contribution to our understanding of the role of wayside inns in supporting early transportation and communication networks in isolated and remote areas of Queensland.

The place demonstrates rare, uncommon or endangered aspects of Queensland's cultural heritage.

The ant bed building is important in demonstrating building techniques and materials no longer common or practiced in Queensland. Constructed of rammed earth (pise de terre) mixed with ant bed, the building is a rare surviving example of the use of ant bed as a building material and of this construction technique. If ant bed was chosen for its insulation value, then the place is even rarer.

The place has potential to yield information that will contribute to an understanding of Queensland's history.

With further analysis of the fabric, the ant bed building has the potential to contribute further to our understanding of early construction techniques and materials in Queensland, especially in remote areas.

The place is important in demonstrating the principal characteristics of a particular class of cultural places.

As the main surviving element of the former farmhouse/inn at Oaky Creek, the ant bed building is important in demonstrating some of the principal characteristics of a small, isolated, 1870s wayside inn-cum-farmhouse. These include the location of the structure close to the Alpha Road; its function as a large, separate store or dairy; and the use of locally available materials in its construction.
