= Stone Farm Building =

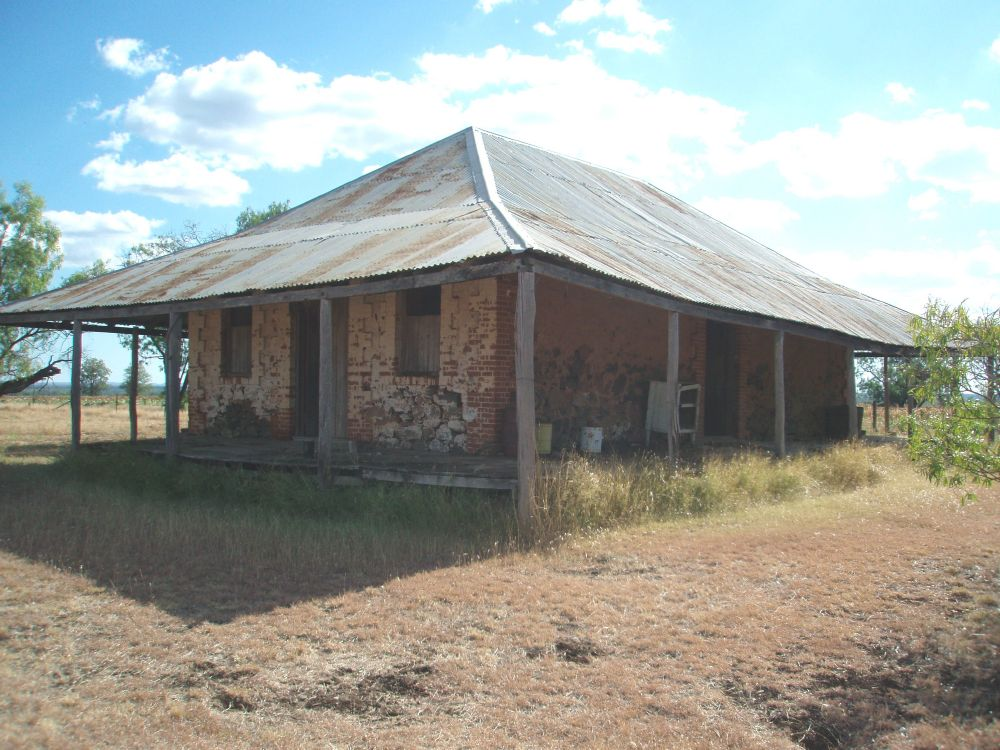
- Stone Farm House, 2007

- Location within Queensland Location within Australia
- 22.7548°S 147.6862°E
- Location: Fleurs, 739 Fleurs Lane, Clermont, Isaac Region, Queensland, Australia

History
- Design period: 1870s–1890s (late 19th century)
- Built: 1880s

Queensland Heritage Register
- Official name: Stone Farm Building, Fleurs
- Type: state heritage (built)
- Designated: 28 August 2008
- Reference no.: 602555
- Significant period: 1880s
- Significant components: dairy/creamery, cellar

Stone Farm Building is a heritage-listed farm building at Fleurs, 739 Fleurs Lane, Clermont, Isaac Region, Queensland, Australia. It was built in 1880s. It is also known as Fleurs. It was added to the Queensland Heritage Register on 28 August 2008.

== History ==
The stone farm building on the property known as Fleurs in the Clermont district of central western Queensland was constructed on land initially selected by William George Hatfield, the son of Thomas and Annie Hatfield. In 1880 members of the Hatfield family selected six adjoining 500 acre portions. The family's homestead was built on portion 202, where the stone farm building still stands. Although the exact date of construction is not known, the existence of a cellar indicates that the building may have been the dairy described in an 1884 inspection of the property.

The Clermont district was opened to non-Indigenous settlement following Ludwig Leichhardt's exploration of the area in 1844 when he noted its potential for pastoralists, agriculturists and miners. The discovery of gold near Hood's Lagoon in the early 1860s paved the way for a rush to the district and a settlement near the lagoon renamed Diggings Lagoon was soon established. This was surveyed by the Queensland Government in December 1863 as the town of Clermont. In January 1877 the Land Commissioner's Office received a petition from the residents of Clermont requesting survey of a town common for "depasturing stock belonging to the town". An area for a town common was resumed from the Crispin Downs and Wena No. 3 runs and was proclaimed as the Clermont Town and Agricultural District Common on 1 March 1878. An 1879 map of the area described the town common as "well grassed open downs".

On 7 January 1880 a section of the Common was proclaimed open for selection, and in February William George Hatfield applied to lease portion 202, consisting of 500 acres of first class pastoral land, under the provisions of the Crown Lands Alienation Act 1876. He was issued a deed of grant in July 1885. By 15 August 1884 improvements on portion 202 included: a dwelling house containing 12 rooms, an underground tank, kitchen and store, the whole valued at £1000; stables, coach house and man's room valued at £150; and a dairy with an underground tank, valued at £300. The construction material for the dairy is not stated in the list of improvements, but local history suggests that this is the surviving stone building.

William George Hatfield was the second oldest son of Thomas Hatfield. Thomas, born in Liverpool near Sydney, worked as a storekeeper and carrier in New South Wales before he decided to move to Queensland, where the discovery of gold at Peak Downs in 1863 had opened opportunities for carriers. Miners needed goods delivered from Rockhampton, and the Peak Downs Cooper Mine needed its smelted ore delivered to the coast. Thomas arrived at Rockhampton in January 1867, and he soon had teams carrying copper from Copperfield to Rockhampton, and later to St Lawrence. The Hatfield family, consisting of Thomas and Annie Hatfield and their seven children, settled in Clermont in late October 1867.

Thomas opened stores at St Lawrence, Copperfield and Clermont to sell the goods he brought in from New South Wales, and in 1868 he also opened the Commercial Hotel in St Lawrence. In 1872 he took up a lease on the Connors River, and he used this selection "Yatton" to breed team horses and run cattle. As Copperfield declined during the 1870s Thomas focused more on Clermont. He became a Justice of the Peace in 1878, served as an Alderman on the Clermont Council, and was a foundation member of the Peak Downs Masonic Lodge in Copperfield in 1879.

In early 1880 Thomas, his four oldest sons (Thomas John, William George, Ernest Alfred, and Henry Herbert) and his brother John selected six adjoining 500 acre portions numbered 200 to 203, plus 207 and 210, on the former Clermont Town and Agricultural Common. These portions were collectively known as Fleurs. The local area had been named Les Fleurs, after its wildflowers, by the first owner of Wolfang Station, Oscar de Satge. Fleurs was used to breed horses, and to conduct sheep farming and dairying.

After Thomas died from typhoid on 13 December 1882, an article in the Peak Downs Telegram noted that he had recently sought to withdraw from business and devote himself to the (horse) stud farm he had recently established at Fleurs. His eldest son Thomas John took over Fleurs, running 4500 sheep and 200 cattle. Thomas John was also a JP, and he served on both the Belyando Divisional Board and the Belyando Shire Council.

In early 1909 Randolph James Wall acquired Fleurs, including portion 202. Wall also ran sheep, and some cattle, on the property. The farm is currently owned by William Fraser, the great grandson of RJ Wall. The stone farm building, which was used as shearer's quarters at one stage, is now used for storage purposes.

== Description ==
Fleurs is a pastoral property situated northeast of Clermont, about 6 kilometres (3.7 mi) along Fleurs Lane from the Gregory Highway. The Stone Farm Building at Fleurs is one of a number of buildings within the complex, including the homestead and several corrugated iron clad sheds (but only the stone building is included in the heritage listing).

The building is a well-constructed, single-storeyed, masonry structure comprising three rooms and an underground cellar. Its hipped, timber-framed roof, incorporating verandahs to all four sides in a broken back form, is clad with short, corrugated iron roof sheets. The verandah roof is supported on bush timber posts and a later verandah floor exists on the south-east and north-east sides. The substantial external walls are of random rubble construction finished externally and internally with ant bed render.

Architectural historian Miles Lewis has recorded the nineteenth century use of crushed anthill clay, or ant bed, for adobe, cob, pise de terre, earthen flooring and later the surfacing of tennis courts. Ant bed appears to have been used mainly in rural areas either due to an absence of other materials, or for its adhesive and/or insulating properties. Comparatively few ant bed structures are known to survive in Queensland. Another building described as being a dairy located in the Clermont area is Irlam's farm building, which is constructed of rammed earth mixed with ant bed.

There is brick quoining to the corners of the stone building at Fleurs and to window and door openings. To accommodate the original verandah floor joists, a brick-on-edge course set between two layers of timber planking, provided a level surface for the joist housing around the perimeter of the building. The existing verandah floor structure abuts the external walls.

All openings have brick arch lintels. There are two windows and a pair of doors with a three-paned fanlight above in the south-east (front) wall and one window in the north-west (rear) wall. A second pair of doors with three-paned fanlight above is in the north-east wall. The window openings in the south-east elevation are lined with wire mesh and each of the windows has a sliding timber panel, and a timber-lined sill and head.

The interior is divided into three rooms with exposed stud timber partition walls lined to door head height. The two smaller interconnecting rooms at the front of the building are separated by a chamferboard-lined wall. A weatherboard-lined wall separates these from the larger room at the rear. There is a timber floor throughout supported on joists housed into log bearers. Access to the cement-rendered cellar is gained through an opening in the floor in a front room via a metal ladder. The cellar is ventilated with openings formed in brickwork in each of the corners, although the exterior openings were not located. Remains of lime wash and painted finishes survive on both internal and external walls.

== Heritage listing ==
Stone Farm Building was listed on the Queensland Heritage Register on 28 August 2008 having satisfied the following criteria.

The place is important in demonstrating the evolution or pattern of Queensland's history.

Constructed between 1880 and 1884 to service the Hatfield family's cluster of selections north of Clermont, collectively known as "Fleurs", the stone farm building on the property remains important in illustrating how early non-indigenous settlers made use of a range of local building materials to construct homesteads in remote districts, poorly serviced by transportation and towns.

The cellar is a good example of the early practice of using cellars for cool food storage, and the building is highly intact, with its original roof form.

The place demonstrates rare, uncommon or endangered aspects of Queensland's cultural heritage.

Constructed of random rubble stone with a rendered layer of ant bed and brick quoining, the stone farm building at Fleurs is a comparatively rare example in Queensland of the use of stone and ant bed to construct a well-made and permanent farm building.
