= Batang Hari =

Batang Hari may refer to:

- Batang Hari Regency, a regency in Jambi Province in Sumatra, Indonesia
- Batang Hari River, the longest river in Sumatra, Indonesia
