= Muaraketalo =

- Location in Indonesia
- Coordinates: 1°58′S 102°59′E
- Country: Indonesia
- Province: Jambi Province
- Regency: Batang Hari Regency

Muaraketalo is a village in the Batang Hari Regency in the Jambi Province of Sumatra, Indonesia.

Nearby towns and villages include Gurun-tua (7.8 nm), Durianluncuk (4.0 nm), Jangga (7.2 nm), Mandiangin (4.1 nm) and Pulaugading (9.2 nm).
