= Singkatigedang =

- Location in Indonesia
- Coordinates: 1°40′S 102°59′E
- Country: Indonesia
- Province: Jambi Province
- Regency: Batang Hari Regency

Singkatigedang is a village in the Batang Hari Regency in the Jambi Province of Sumatra, Indonesia.

Nearby towns and villages include Mersam (8.1 nm), Sungairotan (8.1 nm), Padangkelapa (7.3 nm), Pulaupauh (23.1 nm), Benteng (3.0 nm), and Kermio (7.6 nm).
