= Jebak =

- Location in Indonesia
- Coordinates: 1°49′S 103°6′E
- Country: Indonesia
- Province: Jambi Province
- Regency: Batang Hari Regency
- Headman: Tobasco Pane

Jebak is a village in the Batang Hari Regency in the Jambi Province of Sumatra, Indonesia.

Nearby towns and villages include Matagoal (5.1 nm), Kermio (4.5 nm), Ampelu (4.1 nm), Terusan (8.1 nm), Muarabulian (10.8 nm), Betung (10.4 nm) and Jangga (5.1 nm) .
