= Durianluncuk =

- Location in Indonesia
- Coordinates: 1°54′S 102°59′E
- Country: Indonesia
- Province: Jambi Province
- Regency: Batang Hari Regency

Durianluncuk is a village in the Batang Hari Regency in the Jambi Province of Sumatra, Indonesia.

Nearby towns and villages include Jernih-tua (18.0 nm), Padangkelapa (13.9 nm), Matagoal (4.5 nm), Jangga (6.0 nm), Gurun-tua (10.8 nm), Muaraketalo (4.0 nm).
