= Kuap =

- Location in Indonesia
- Coordinates: 1°35′S 103°20′E
- Country: Indonesia
- Province: Jambi Province
- Regency: Batang Hari Regency

Kuap is a village in the Batang Hari Regency in the Jambi Province of Sumatra, Indonesia.

Nearby towns and villages include Palayangan (8.6 nm), Merlung (26.2 nm), Lubukrusa(1.4 nm), Selat (7.3 nm), Pijoan (10.0 nm), Muarasingoan (5.7 nm), Bejubang (13.0 nm) and Tempino (15.6 nm).
