= Padangkelapa =

- Location in Indonesia
- Coordinates: 1°42′S 102°52′E
- Country: Indonesia
- Province: Jambi Province
- Regency: Batang Hari Regency

Padangkelapa is a village in the Batang Hari Regency in the Jambi Province of Sumatra, Indonesia.

Nearby towns and villages include Tanahgaro (12.0 nm), Peninjauan (7.3 nm), Mersam (3.2 nm), Sungairotan (3.2 nm), Singkatigedang (7.3 nm), Matagoal (12.0 nm), Kermio (11.2 nm), Jernih-tua (20.6 nm) and Durianluncuk (13.9 nm).
