= Pematangpayung =

- Location in Indonesia
- Coordinates: 1°6′S 103°21′E
- Country: Indonesia
- Province: Jambi Province
- Regency: East Tanjung Jabung Regency

Pematangpayung is a village in the East Tanjung Jabung Regency in the Jambi Province of Sumatra, Indonesia.

Nearby towns and villages include Merlung (20.1 nm), Telukbengkah (17.7 nm), Pelabuhandagang (16.1 nm), Teluknilan (17.5 nm), Beramhitam-besar (15.3 nm), Pematanglumut (3.0 nm), Lubukrusa (28.0 nm) and Teluk (25.7 nm) .
