= Betung =

- Location in Indonesia
- Coordinates: 1°52′S 103°16′E
- Country: Indonesia
- Province: Jambi Province
- Regency: Batang Hari Regency
- District: Pemayung

Betung is a town in the Batang Hari Regency in the Jambi Province of Sumatra, Indonesia.

Nearby towns and villages include Jangga (11.2 nm), Jebak (10.4 nm), Muarabulian (9.1 nm), Bejubang (5.0 nm), Berangan (1.0 nm) and Pinangtinggi (5.8 nm) .
