= Muarasingoan =

- Location in Indonesia
- Coordinates: 1°39′S 103°16′E
- Country: Indonesia
- Province: Jambi Province
- Regency: Batang Hari Regency

Muarasingoan is a village in the Batang Hari Regency in the Jambi Province of Sumatra, Indonesia.

Nearby towns and villages include Palayangan (3.2 nm), Kuap (5.7 nm), Muarabulian (4.1 nm) and Bejubang (9.5 nm).
