= Ampelu =

- Location in Indonesia
- Coordinates: 1°45′S 103°5′E
- Country: Indonesia
- Province: Jambi Province
- Regency: Batang Hari Regency

Ampelu is a village in the Batang Hari Regency in the Jambi Province of Sumatra, Indonesia.

Nearby towns and villages include Kermio (3.6 nm), Benteng (5.8 nm), Muaratembesi (3.6 nm), Terusan (5.8 nm), and Jebak (4.1 nm).
