= Kermio =

- Location in Indonesia
- Coordinates: 1°47′S 103°2′E
- Country: Indonesia
- Province: Jambi Province
- Regency: Batang Hari Regency

Kermio is a village in the Batang Hari Regency in the Jambi Province of Sumatra, Indonesia.

Nearby towns and villages include Padangkelapa (11.2 nm), Singkatigedang(7.6 nm), Benteng (7.0 nm), Ampelu (3.6 nm), Jebak (4.5 nm) and Matagoal (3.2 nm).
