= Górniczy Agregat Gaśniczy =

Jet engine unit used in mines

The Górniczy Agregat Gaśniczy (GAG) is a jet engine inertisation unit developed for use in mines, controlling and suppressing coal seam fires and neutralising firedamp situations. The unit was designed in Poland in the 1970s, and its name roughly translates as "Mine Fire Suppression Apparatus". A GAG 3A unit was developed by the Queensland Mines Rescue Service, in association with the Commonwealth Scientific and Industrial Research Organisation (CSIRO). GAG units have been used in Australia since 1998.

== Mechanism ==
The GAG unit emits carbon dioxide, nitrogen and water vapour. The gases lower the oxygen levels, suppressing fires, and forcing methane out of the mine. A unit is capable of pumping a volume of 25 m^{3}/s, creating levels of less than 1% oxygen. When fully assembled, the unit is 12 metres long and weighs 2.5 tonnes. As of 2010, there are only three GAG units in the world – in Australia, the Netherlands and Ukraine. The "GAG" unit from the Netherlands is called Steamexfire.

== Notable usage ==
GAG units have been used in Australia, most notably in 2000 at the Blair Athol Mine, Queensland, where one extinguished a 54-year-old coal fire. In 2003, a team from the Queensland Mine Rescue Service took a unit to West Virginia, where they extinguished a 660-foot (200 m) deep, two-month-old fire at Loveridge Mine after ten days of continuous use. Queensland's unit was also transported to New Zealand in 2010 for use after the Pike River Mine disaster.

== See also ==
- Inert gas generator
