= Tempino =

- Location in Indonesia
- Coordinates: 1°47′S 103°30′E
- Country: Indonesia
- Province: Jambi Province
- Regency: Batang Hari Regency

Tempino is a town in the Batang Hari Regency in the Jambi Province of Sumatra, Indonesia.

Nearby towns and villages include Bejubang (11.0 nm), Kuap (15.6 nm), Pijoan (12.0 nm), Kinati (10.4 nm), Paalmerah (12.7 nm) and Talangpelempang (2.0 nm). .
