= Pinangtinggi =

- Location in Indonesia
- Coordinates: 1°57′S 103°19′E
- Country: Indonesia
- Province: Jambi Province
- Regency: Batang Hari Regency

Pinangtinggi is a village in the Jambi Province of Sumatra, Indonesia.

Nearby towns and villages include Pulaugading (16.1 nm), Berangan (5.0 nm), Betung (5.8 nm), Bejubang (9.0 nm), Talangpelempang (13.6 nm), Talang Gudang (12.2 nm), Melabuai (11.2 nm) and Hulukandang (9.2 nm).
