= Clermont Airport =

Airport in Queensland, Australia

- IATA: CMQ; ICAO: YCMT

Summary
- Airport type: Public
- Operator: Isaac Regional Council
- Serves: Clermont, Queensland, Australia
- Elevation AMSL: 908 ft / 277 m
- Coordinates: 22°46′18.6″S 147°37′07″E

Map
- Location in Queensland

Runways
| Direction | Length | | Surface |
| Direction | m | ft | Surface |
|---|---|---|---|
| 15/33 | 1,311 | 4,301 | Asphalt |
| 01/19 | 1,068 | 3,504 | Gravel |
- Sources: Australian AIP and aerodrome chart

Clermont Airport (IATA: CMQ, ICAO: YCMT) is an airport serving Clermont, Queensland, Australia. It is located 3.5 nautical miles (6.5 km; 4.0 mi) north northeast of the city.

== See also ==
- List of airports in Queensland
