= Bejubang =

- Location in Indonesia
- Coordinates: 1°48′S 103°19′E
- Country: Indonesia
- Province: Jambi Province
- Regency: Batang Hari Regency
- Elevation: 223 ft (68 m)

Population (2005)
  - Total: 7,957

Bejubang, also known as Bajubang, is a town and district (kecamatan) of the Batang Hari Regency in the Jambi Province of Sumatra, Indonesia. Nearby towns and villages include Muara Bulian (6.4 nm), Muarasingoan (9.5 nm), Kuap (13.0 nm), Talangpelempang (11.0 nm), Tempino (11.0 nm), Betung (5.0 nm) and Pinangtinggi (9.0 nm) .
