= Blair Athol coal mine =

Mine in Queensland, Australia

Coordinates: 22°41′49″S 147°32′44″E

Blair Athol Coal Mine
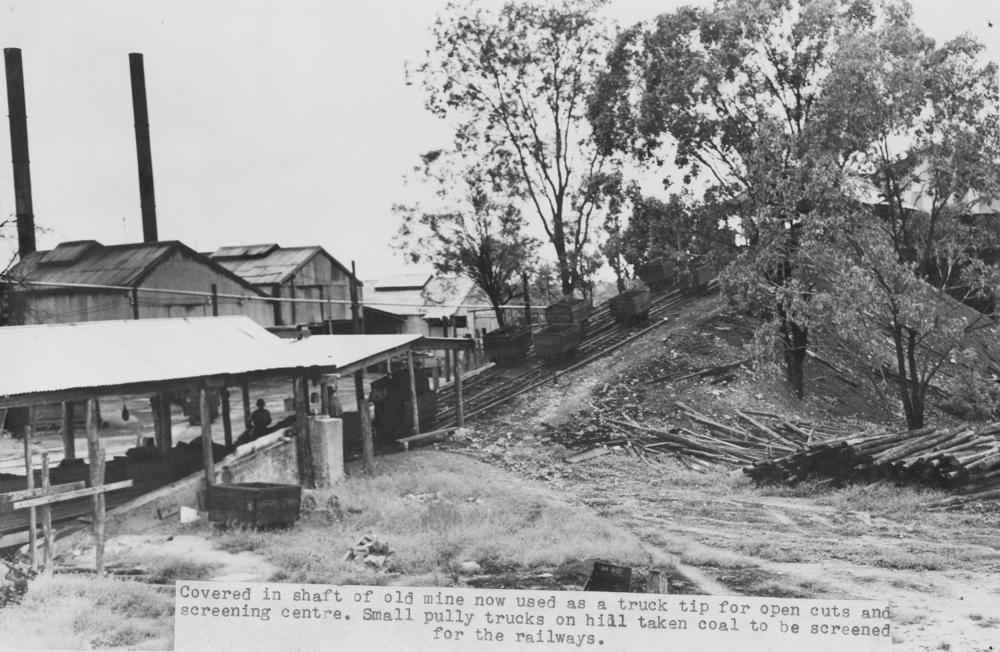
- Mine buildings at Blair Athol, 1950
- Interactive map of Blair Athol Coal Mine
- Location: Queensland, Australia
- Products: Thermal coal
- Company: TerraCom
- Acquired: 2017

The Blair Athol Coal Mine is a coal mine located in the Bowen Basin of Central Queensland, Australia. It is located over the former site of the township of Blair Athol. The mine has coal reserves amounting to 195 million tonnes of thermal coal, one of the largest coal reserves in Asia and the world. The mine has an annual production capacity of 12.9 million tonnes of coal.

Coal was first discovered at this location in 1864 and has been mined from this area since this time by different companies.

There are four seams, three notable for their thickness. Numbered from top to bottom, the seams are: No.1 seam — 7.5 m thick (and completely mined out), No.2 seam — only 1.2 m thick (and not mined), No.3 seam — average 29 m thick and up to 32 m in places (the focus of more recent operations), and No. 4 seam — 3 to 5 m thick (yet to be mined).

Underground mining changed to small-scale open cut mining in the 1920–1930s, the first open cut coal mine in Queensland. Larger scale open cut mining began in 1936, leading to the complete closure of all underground operations.

Coal seam fires that originate from spontaneous combustion in the old underground mine workings are a notable feature of this coal mine, typically flaring up when open cut mining intersects or nears those old underground workings. One fire burned underground for 54 years. Various techniques have been applied to manage and extinguish the fires, including using a GAG jet engine inertisation unit in 2000 and, on at least one occasion, in January 2004, open cut mining of the burning coal seam.

In 1968, the Blair Athol coal field was taken over by two large multinationals, CRA and Clutha Development. Exploration showed that the township was over the main coal seam, resulting in the relocation of residences to the nearby town of Clermont in the mid-1970s.

In 1984, the Rio Tinto company opened its main mine at this location, as a large scale open cut mine. Peak production was reached in 2009 with 11.3 million tonnes of coal exported. Rio Tinto Coal Australia closed the mine in August 2012 because it was nearly exhausted. Blair Athol was bought by New Emerald Coal, a subsidiary of Linc Energy in 2013.

The Blair Athol Mine was acquired by TerraCom in 2017 and mining of coal resumed the following year. A 2021 reserve update extended the life of the mine until 2035.
