= Jangga =

- Location in Indonesia
- Coordinates: 1°54′S 103°5′E
- Country: Indonesia
- Province: Jambi Province
- Regency: Batang Hari Regency

Jangga is a village in the Batang Hari Regency in the Jambi Province of Sumatra, Indonesia.

Nearby towns and villages include Muaraketalo (7.2 nm), Durianluncuk (6.0 nm), Matagoal (5.7 nm), Jebak(5.1 nm), Berangan (11.0 nm), Betung (11.2 nm) and Pulaugading (11.0 nm).
