= Talangpelempang =

- Location in Indonesia
- Coordinates: 1°49′S 103°30′E
- Country: Indonesia
- Province: Jambi Province
- Regency: Batang Hari Regency

Talangpelempang is a town in the Jambi Province of Sumatra, Indonesia. It is located 17 miles (27 km) from the town of Jambi.

Nearby towns and villages include Pinangtinggi (13.6 nm), Bejubang (11.0 nm), Tempino (2.0 nm), Paalmerah (14.2 nm), Talang Gudang (6.1 nm) and Muarabahar (14.4 nm).
