= Muarabulian =

- Location in Indonesia
- Coordinates: 1°43′S 103°5′E
- Country: Indonesia
- Province: Jambi Province
- Regency: Batang Hari Regency

Muarabulian is the capital of Batang Hari Regency in the Jambi Province of Sumatra, Indonesia.

Nearby towns and villages include Jebak (10.8 nm), Terusan (5.1 nm), Palayangan (3.6 nm), Muarasingoan (4.1 nm), Betung(9.1 nm) and Bejubang(6.4 nm).

== Climate ==
Muarabulian has a tropical rainforest climate (Af) with moderate rainfall in June and July and heavy rainfall in the remaining months.

Climate data for Muarabulian
| Month | Jan | Feb | Mar | Apr | May | Jun | Jul | Aug | Sep | Oct | Nov | Dec | Year |
|---|---|---|---|---|---|---|---|---|---|---|---|---|---|
| Mean daily maximum °C (°F) | 30.3 (86.5) | 30.8 (87.4) | 31.3 (88.3) | 31.8 (89.2) | 31.8 (89.2) | 31.5 (88.7) | 31.5 (88.7) | 31.6 (88.9) | 31.8 (89.2) | 31.7 (89.1) | 31.4 (88.5) | 30.6 (87.1) | 31.3 (88.4) |
| Daily mean °C (°F) | 26.4 (79.5) | 26.6 (79.9) | 26.9 (80.4) | 27.4 (81.3) | 27.3 (81.1) | 27.0 (80.6) | 26.7 (80.1) | 26.9 (80.4) | 27.1 (80.8) | 27.1 (80.8) | 27.0 (80.6) | 26.6 (79.9) | 26.9 (80.5) |
| Mean daily minimum °C (°F) | 22.5 (72.5) | 22.5 (72.5) | 22.6 (72.7) | 23.0 (73.4) | 22.9 (73.2) | 22.6 (72.7) | 22.0 (71.6) | 22.2 (72.0) | 22.4 (72.3) | 22.5 (72.5) | 22.6 (72.7) | 22.7 (72.9) | 22.5 (72.6) |
| Average rainfall mm (inches) | 267 (10.5) | 221 (8.7) | 270 (10.6) | 267 (10.5) | 182 (7.2) | 119 (4.7) | 114 (4.5) | 135 (5.3) | 175 (6.9) | 233 (9.2) | 279 (11.0) | 272 (10.7) | 2,534 (99.8) |
Source: Climate-Data.org
