= Paalmerah =

- Location in Indonesia
- Coordinates: 1°38′S 103°39′E
- Country: Indonesia
- Province: Jambi Province
- Regency: Batang Hari Regency

Paalmerah is a town in the Jambi Province of Sumatra, Indonesia. It is located 2.8 miles from the town of Jambi.

Nearby towns and villages include Kinati (6.1 nm), Muarakumpe (4.1 nm), Sungaiterap (6.1 nm), Talangpelempang (14.2 nm), Tempino (12.7 nm), Muarabahar (23.0 nm).

The town has an airport, Paalmerah Airport which serves the city of Jambi that has 73 flights departing per week for short haul destinations. Paalmerah has 42 medium-sized aircraft departing each week.
