= Kinati =

- Location in Indonesia
- Coordinates: 1°37′S 103°33′E
- Country: Indonesia
- Province: Jambi Province
- Regency: Kodya Jambi

Kenali Besar is a village in the Jambi Province of Sumatra, Indonesia. It is located 4.1 miles outside the city of Jambi.

Nearby towns and villages include Pijoan (3.6 nm), Mendalo (2.2 nm), Paalmerah (6.1 nm) and Tempino (10.4 nm)
