= Town of Clermont =

Former local government area in Queensland, Australia

Coordinates: 22.832°S 147.645°E

The Town of Clermont is a former local government area for Clermont, Queensland, Australia.

== History ==
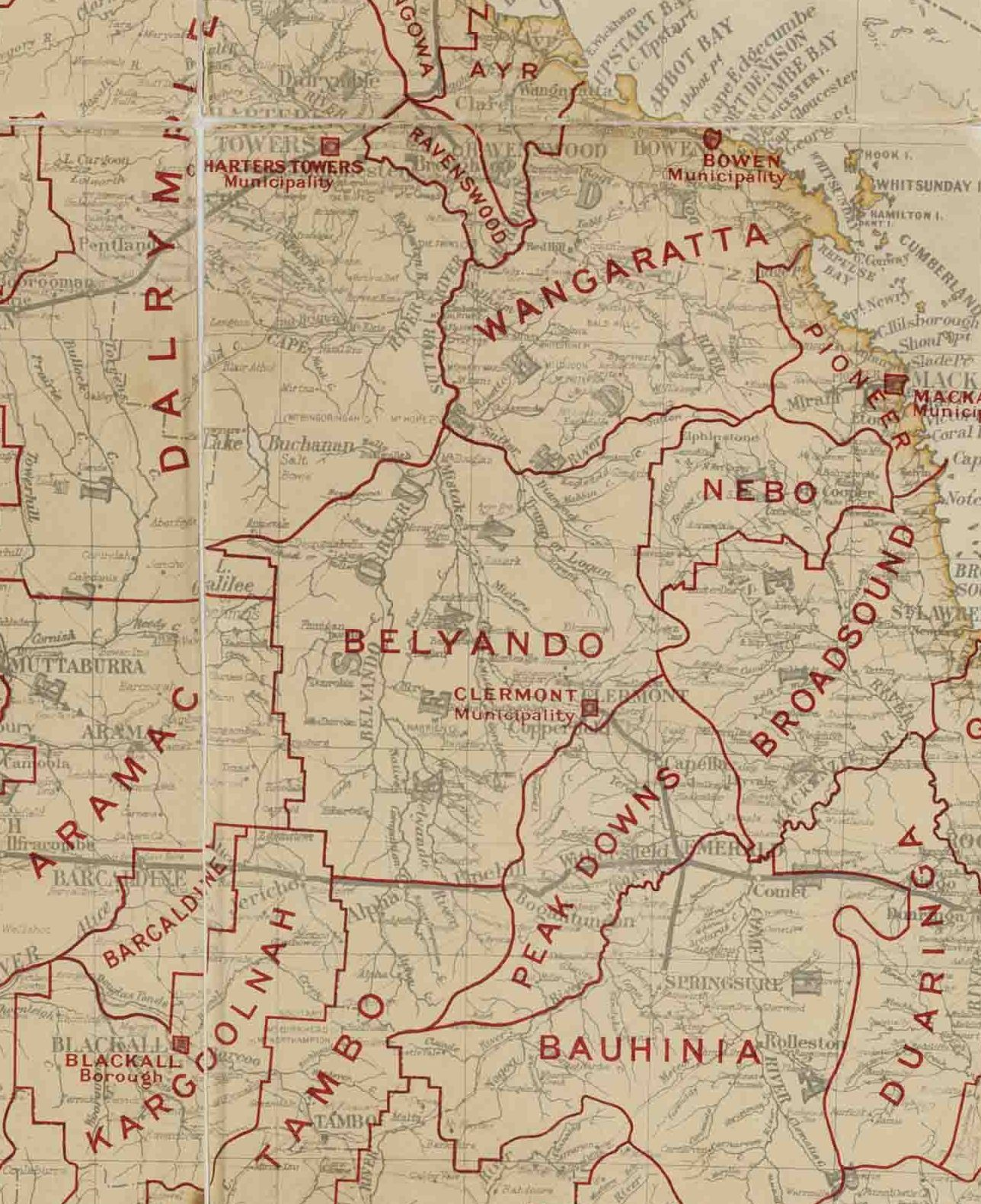
Borough of Clermont and its adjacent local government areas, March 1902

The Borough of Clermont was established in January 1867.

On 31 March 1903, under the Local Authorities Act (1902), the Borough of Clermont became the Town of Clermont.

In 1930, the Town of Clermont was absorbed into the Shire of Belyando (which had previously surrounded the town).

== Mayors ==
- 1867: John Winter
- 1883: B. Mullen
- 1891: H. H. Thompson
- 1892: W. G. Griffin
- 1921: Dr John Higgins
- 1927: E. Bowler
