= Clermont, Queensland =

Clermont
- Town
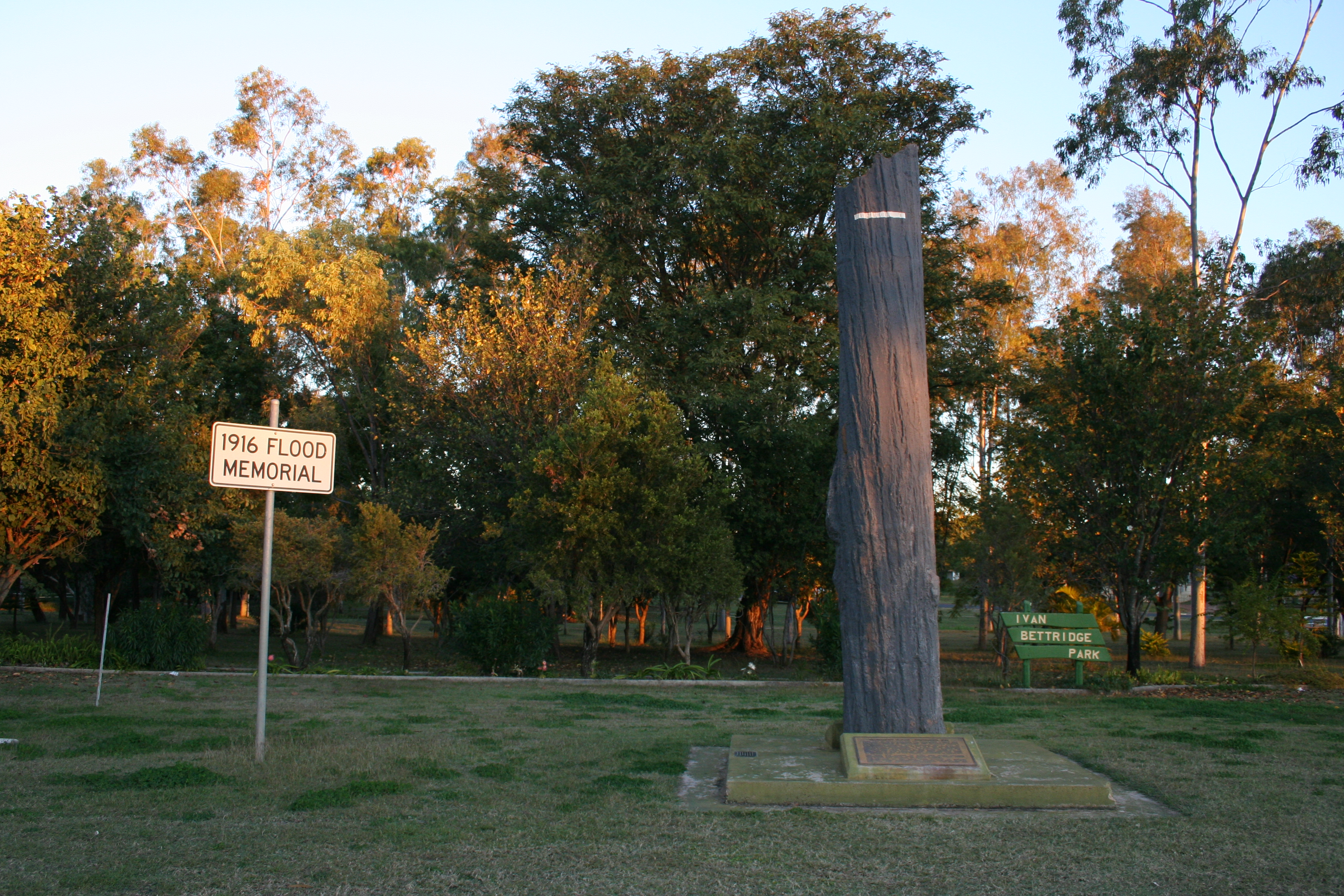
- Memorial marking the 1916 flood

- Interactive map of Clermont
- Coordinates: 22.8230°S 147.6383°E
- Country: Australia
- State: Queensland
- LGA: Isaac
- Location: 109 km (68 mi) NNW of Emerald; 289 km (180 mi) SW of Mackay; 380 km (240 mi) WNW of Rockhampton; 940 km (580 mi) NW of Brisbane
- Established: 1864

Government
  - State electorate: Burdekin
  - Federal division: Capricornia

Area
  - Total: 5,158.9 km^{2} (1,991.9 sq mi)
- Elevation: 267.0 m (876.0 ft)

Population
  - Total: 2,952 (2021 census)
  - Density: 0.57222/km^{2} (1.48203/sq mi)
- Time zone: UTC+10:00 (AEST)
- Postcode: 4721
- Mean max temp: 29.6 °C (85.3 °F)
- Mean min temp: 15.0 °C (59.0 °F)
- Annual rainfall: 663.7 mm (26.13 in)
Localities around Clermont
Laglan	Frankfield	Kilcummin
Alpha	Clermont	Wolfang; Cheeseborough
Quetta	Peak Vale	Theresa Creek

Clermont is a rural town and locality in the Isaac Region, Queensland, Australia. Clermont is a major hub for the large coal mines in the region, and is also a service town for agricultural properties in the area. In the 2021 census, the locality of Clermont had a population of 2,952 people.

== Geography ==
Clermont is 274 kilometres (170 mi) south-west of Mackay, at the junction of the Gregory and Peak Downs highways.

The historic towns of North Copperfield (22.8577°S 147.6046°E) and South Copperfield (22.8704°S 147.6027°E), often referred to collectively as Copperfield are along Christoe Street approximately 4 kilometres (2.5 mi) south-west of the Clermont town centre.

The Gregory Highway runs through the eastern end, and the Peak Downs Highway enters from the east. The Clermont Connection Road links the Gregory Highway to the CBD, and the Clermont-Alpha Road starts in the CBD and exits to the south-west.

=== Climate ===
Climate data for Clermont Airport (1991–2020)
Month	Jan	Feb	Mar	Apr	May	Jun	Jul	Aug	Sep	Oct	Nov	Dec	Year
Record high °C (°F)	45.0 (113.0)	42.5 (108.5)	41.0 (105.8)	36.6 (97.9)	35.0 (95.0)	31.8 (89.2)	31.5 (88.7)	36.0 (96.8)	39.0 (102.2)	41.9 (107.4)	44.0 (111.2)	44.3 (111.7)	45.0 (113.0)
Mean daily maximum °C (°F)	34.5 (94.1)	33.5 (92.3)	32.6 (90.7)	29.9 (85.8)	26.4 (79.5)	23.7 (74.7)	23.7 (74.7)	25.9 (78.6)	29.7 (85.5)	32.3 (90.1)	33.9 (93.0)	34.8 (94.6)	30.1 (86.2)
Daily mean °C (°F)	28.2 (82.8)	27.6 (81.7)	26.2 (79.2)	23.0 (73.4)	19.0 (66.2)	16.1 (61.0)	15.4 (59.7)	17.1 (62.8)	21.1 (70.0)	24.4 (75.9)	26.5 (79.7)	27.9 (82.2)	22.7 (72.9)
Mean daily minimum °C (°F)	21.9 (71.4)	21.6 (70.9)	19.9 (67.8)	16.0 (60.8)	11.6 (52.9)	8.5 (47.3)	7.0 (44.6)	8.3 (46.9)	12.6 (54.7)	16.5 (61.7)	19.2 (66.6)	21.1 (70.0)	15.4 (59.7)
Record low °C (°F)	15.5 (59.9)	12.9 (55.2)	12.0 (53.6)	3.4 (38.1)	0.0 (32.0)	−2.1 (28.2)	−4.5 (23.9)	−2.7 (27.1)	−1.0 (30.2)	2.6 (36.7)	10.8 (51.4)	12.8 (55.0)	−4.5 (23.9)
Average precipitation mm (inches)	96.9 (3.81)	109.8 (4.32)	64.7 (2.55)	27.5 (1.08)	18.2 (0.72)	23.2 (0.91)	17.2 (0.68)	21.1 (0.83)	16.9 (0.67)	33.9 (1.33)	56.4 (2.22)	81.5 (3.21)	567.3 (22.33)
Average precipitation days (≥ 1 mm)	7.2	7.3	4.1	2.6	2.2	2.5	1.4	1.8	1.8	3.3	4.9	6.1	45.1
Average dew point °C (°F)	18.5 (65.3)	18.9 (66.0)	17.2 (63.0)	13.7 (56.7)	10.4 (50.7)	8.2 (46.8)	6.4 (43.5)	6.3 (43.3)	8.7 (47.7)	11.6 (52.9)	14.2 (57.6)	16.6 (61.9)	12.6 (54.7)
Source: National Oceanic and Atmospheric Administration

== History ==
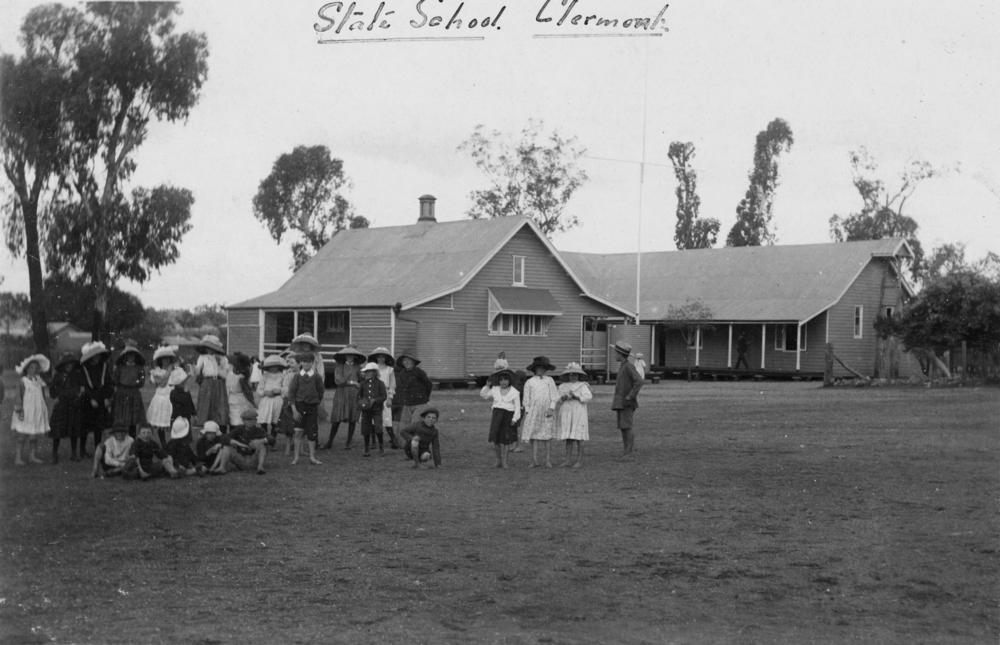
Clermont State School, circa 1905

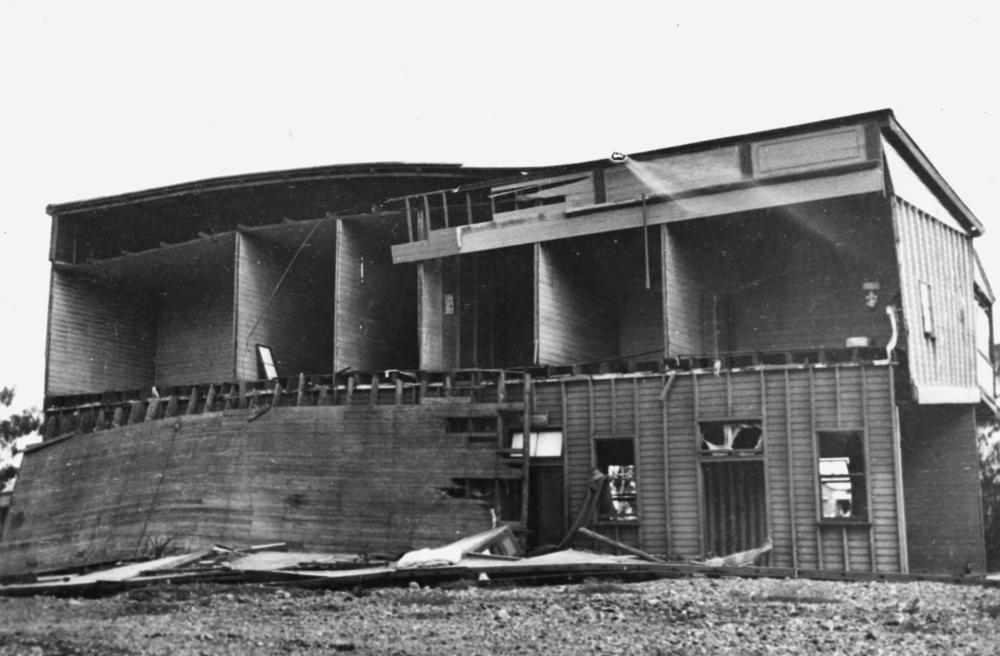
Flood damaged, two-storey house, 1916

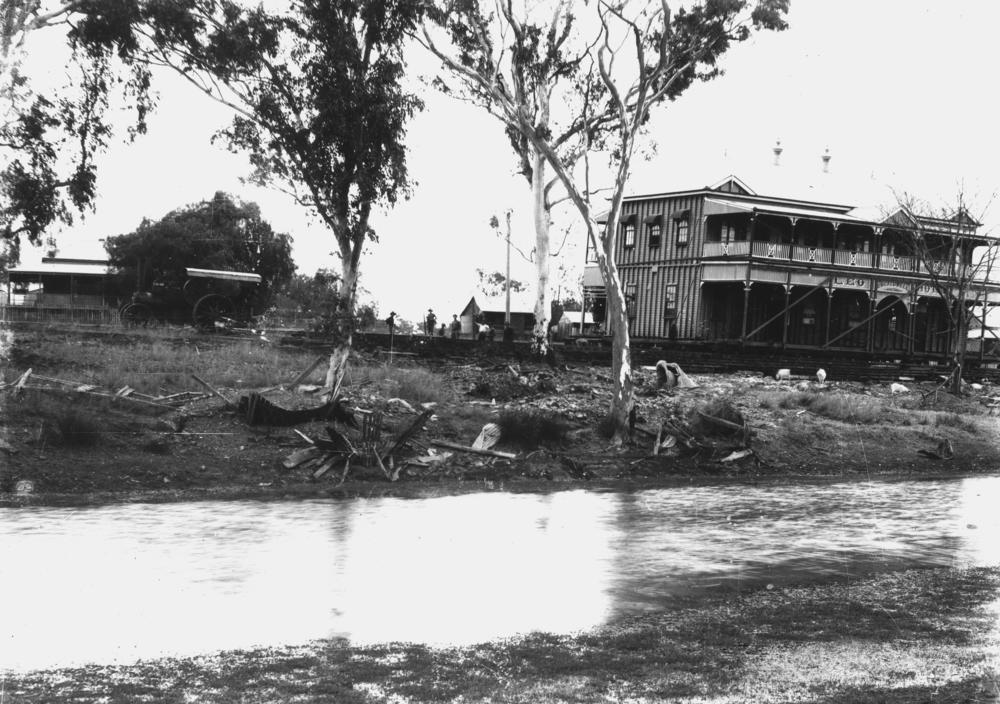
Leo Hotel moving along Lime Street after the flood, 1917

Gangalu (Gangulu, Kangulu, Kanolu, Kaangooloo, Khangulu) is an Australian Aboriginal language spoken on Gangula country. The Gangula language region includes the towns of Clermont and Springsure, extending south towards the Dawson River.

Ludwig Leichhardt was the first European to pass through the Clermont area in 1845, but it was the discovery of gold in 1861 that was responsible for the establishment of the town, close to what was Babbinburra clan land.

The town reserve was proclaimed on 25 March 1864, although a gold field was declared in the area in 1862. Clermont is named after Clermont-Ferrand in France; Clermont-Ferrand was the ancestral home of Oscar de Satge, one of the first European graziers who owned the Wolfang Downs pastoral run.

Theresa Creek Post Office opened by 1863, was replaced by Coppermines Post Office at the end of 1863 and Clermont Post Office in 1864.

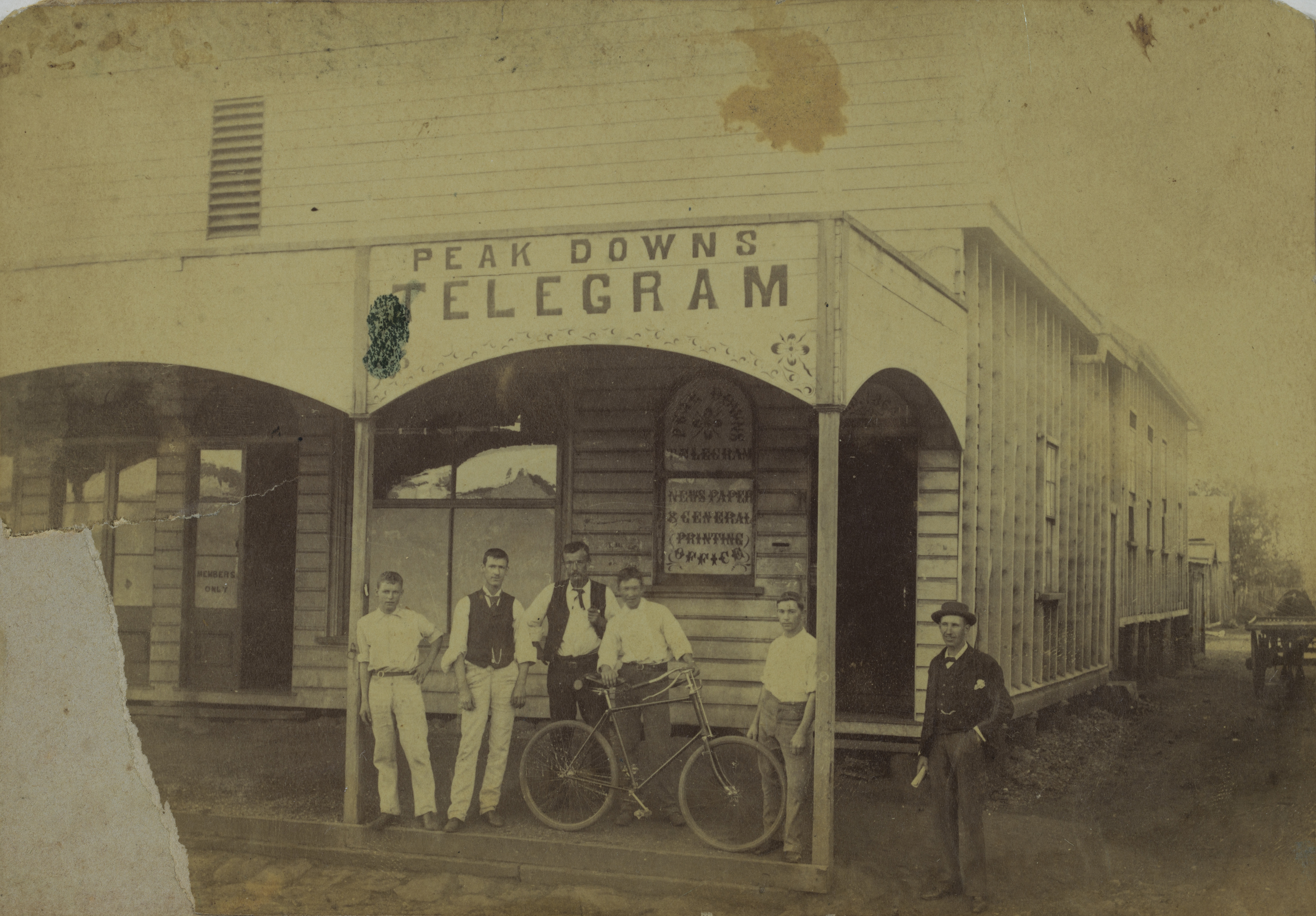
Peak Downs Telegram Office

In the 1860s and 1870s the area around Clermont was known as "the Peak Downs". The first newspaper, the Peak Downs Telegram and Mining Record, was established in August 1864, and the first issue was dated Tuesday, 4 October.

The first church in Clermont was a Catholic church opened on Sunday 4 November 1866 and dedicated to St Mary, Blessed Virgin of Sorrows.

Clermont State School opened on 27 August 1867.

A Congregational church opened in North Copperfield in November 1868.

The Presbyterian Church in Clermont opened in 1878. It was formally re-opened on Sunday 10 June 1883.

Copper was discovered soon after. In the 1880s up to 4000 Chinese people were resident in Clermont, mining for gold and copper. This led to racial riots and the Chinese were removed from the region in 1888.

The decorated soldier Billy Sing was born in Clermont in 1886 of a Chinese father and English mother.

The railway was extended north from Emerald to Clermont in February 1884. However, no passenger trains are available to or from Clermont.

A Wesleyan Methodist Church opened in Clermont on the corner of Box Street and Capella Street on Sunday 19 September 1886. This is the site of the current Clermont Uniting Church, but the current church building was built circa 1970.

The town was originally established on low-lying ground next to a lagoon or billabong; flooding was always a problem, with four substantial floods occurring between 1864 and 1896.

St Joseph's School opened in January 1900.

The greatest flood, in 1916, killed 65 people out of a town population of 1,500 and remains one of Australia's worst natural disasters in terms of life lost. Following the 1916 flood, many of the wooden buildings of the town were moved using steam traction engines to a new townsite on higher ground. A local amateur photographer, Gordon Pullar took numerous photographs of the moving buildings, published in the 1980s as "A Shifting Town".

In the mid-1920s, The Capricornian newspaper refers to a Mr P. Matones (Matonez) as being one of the first owners of the Paris café in Clermont. John (Jack) and Marouli (Monty) Faros took over the Café in the 1930s. It operated until 1992.

In 1935, Clermont was important line linking with Charters Towers for public telephone communications.

The Clermont public library was opened in 1962.

On 27 January 1959, a secondary department was added to Clermont State School, providing secondary education for years 8 to 12. That arrangement ceased with the opening of Clermont State High School on 29 January 1990.

Mistake Creek State School opened in the former locality of Mistake Creek on 24 January 1983.

On 17 May 2019, it was decided to discontinue the locality of Mistake Creek and absorb its land into the neighbouring localities of Clermont, Laglan, Frankfield and Peak Vale.

== Demographics ==
In the 2011 census, the town of Clermont had a population of 2,177 people.

In the 2016 census, the locality of Clermont had a population of 3,031 people.

In the 2021 census, the locality of Clermont had a population of 2,952 people.

== Heritage listings ==
Clermont has a number of heritage-listed sites, including:

- Clermont Cemetery, Cemetery Road (22.8103°S 147.6467°E)
- Stone Farm Building, 739 Fleurs Lane (22.7548°S 147.6862°E)
- Irlam's Ant Bed Building, Oaky Creek, 20 kilometres (12 mi) west of Clermont on the Clermont-Alpha Road (22.8175°S 147.4761°E)

== Coal mining ==
Glencore is currently operating the Clermont Mine, located 12 kilometres (7.5 mi) north west of Clermont. When the mine reaches full capacity it will produce up to 12.2 million tonnes of thermal coal for international markets. Clermont Mine delivered its first conveyor of coal in April 2010.

Clermont also hosted another larger coal mine; Blair Athol coal mine, located 20 kilometres (12 mi) north west of Clermont. The mine supplied customers in Asia and Europe with up to 12 million tonnes of thermal coal per annum. The coal deposit was originally discovered on the site in 1864 and was first mined in 1890. Between 1920 and 1945 coal was mined with an underground method, which is still visible today. The most recent open cut operation started in 1984. Blair Athol Mine was closed on 26 November 2012 after it became completely mined out, with its stockpile and train facilities to be used by the Clermont Mine.

== Education ==
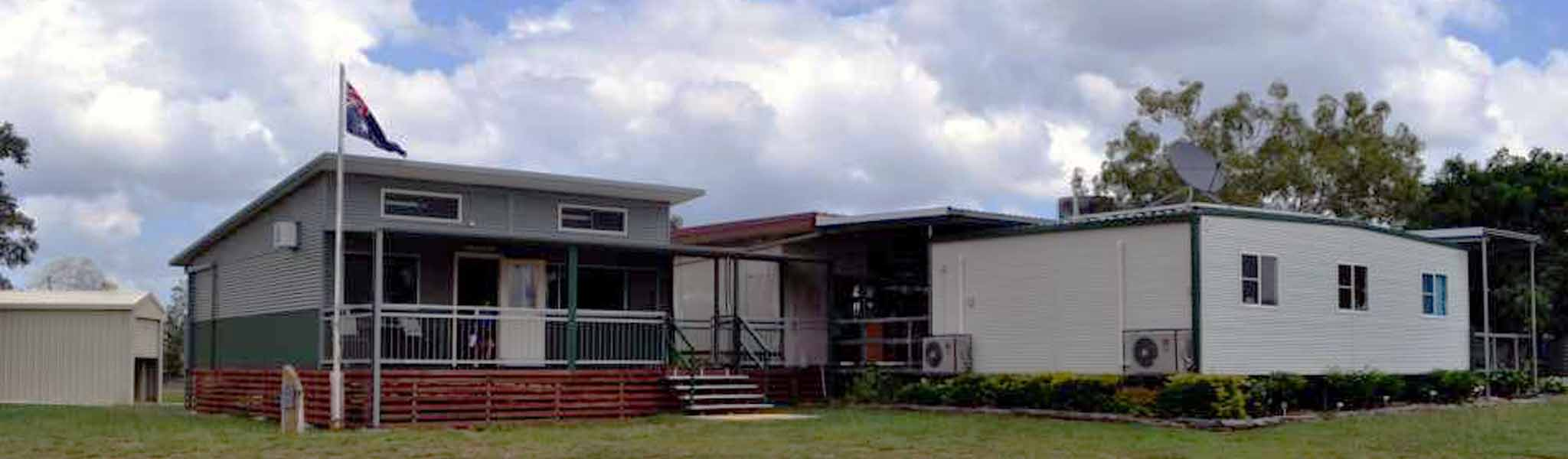
Mistake Creek State School

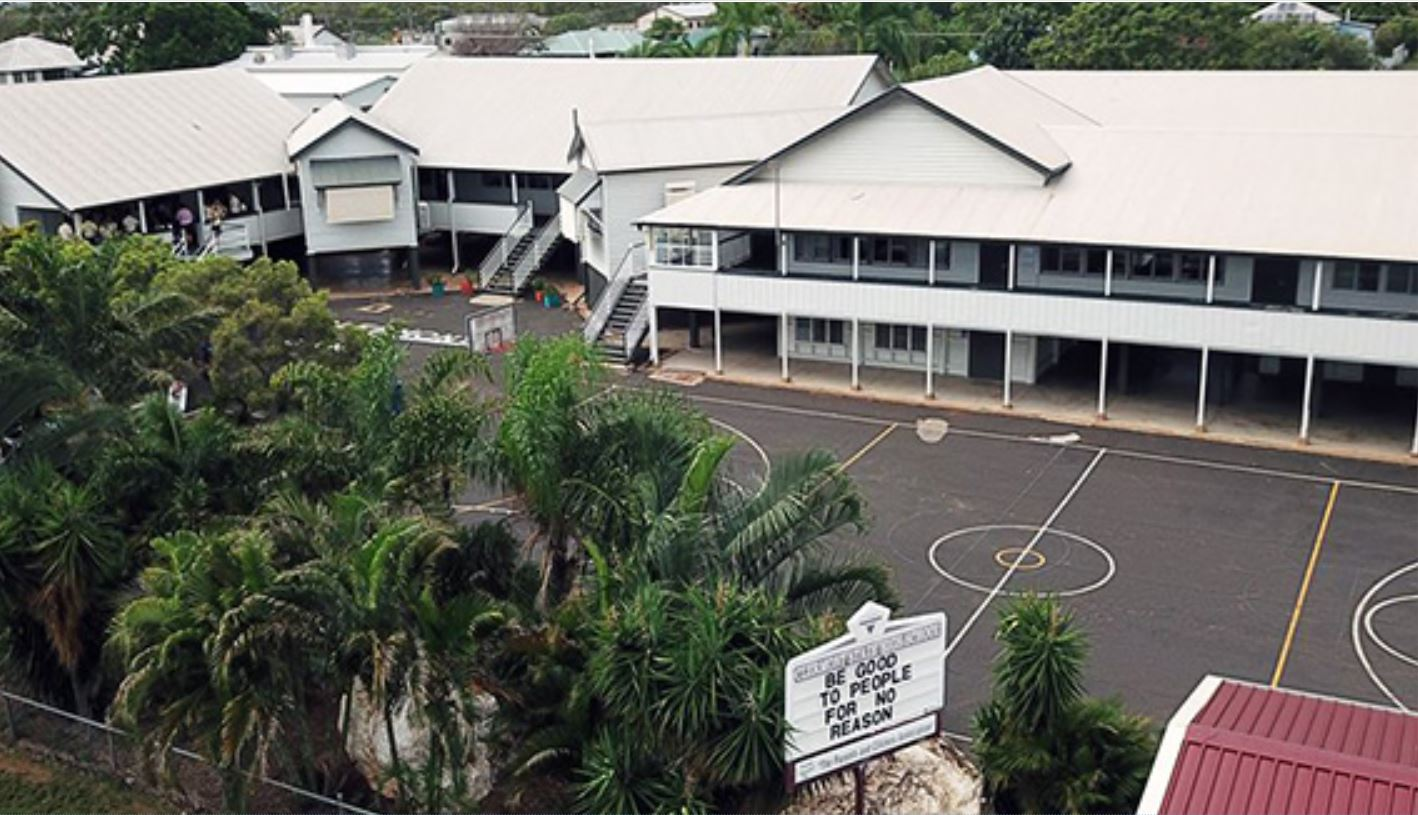
Clermont State High School

Clermont State School is a government primary (Prep–6) school for boys and girls at Hetherington Street (22.8365°S 147.6321°E). In 2017, the school had an enrolment of 237 students with 20 teachers (18 full-time equivalent) and 12 non-teaching staff (9 full-time equivalent).

Mistake Creek State School is a government primary (Prep–6) school for boys and girls at 6652 Alpha Road (22.9889°S 147.0833°E). In 2017, the school had an enrolment of 14 students with 2 teachers and 2 non-teaching staff (1 full-time equivalent). This school is within the former locality of Mistake Creek, which was discontinued and absorbed into neighbouring localities in May 2019; the school is now within the enlarged boundaries of the locality of Clermont.

St Joseph's Catholic Primary School is a Catholic primary (Prep–6) school for boys and girls at 50 Box Street (22.8220°S 147.6391°E). In 2017, the school had an enrolment of 106 students with 10 teachers (9 full-time equivalent) and 6 non-teaching staff (3 full-time equivalent).

Clermont State High School is a government secondary (7–12) school for boys and girls at 1 Kitchener Street (22.8277°S 147.6389°E). In 2017, the school had an enrolment of 182 students with 20 teachers and 15 non-teaching staff (11 full-time equivalent).

== Amenities ==
The Isaac Regional Council operates a public library at the corner of Karmoo and Herschel Street.

The Clermont branch of the Queensland Country Women's Association meets at the QCWA Rooms at 28 Sirus Street.

Clermont Uniting Church is at 40 Box Street (corner of Capella Street, 22.8220°S 147.6409°E).

Clermont aerodrome lies 3.5 nautical miles (6.5 km; 4.0 mi) north northeast of the town.

== Attractions ==
Clermont Historical Centre has displays relating the history of settlement, farming and mining in Clermont, Copperfield, and Blair Athol.
