= Teluk =

- Location in Indonesia
- Coordinates: 1°31′S 103°27′E
- Country: Indonesia
- Province: Jambi Province
- Regency: Batang Hari Regency

Teluk is a village in the Batang Hari Regency in the Jambi Province of Sumatra, Indonesia.

In March 2024 the fishing village in Indonesia was flooded with tons of debris due to strong tides caused by heavy rains.
