= Blair Athol, Queensland =

Blair Athol
- Town
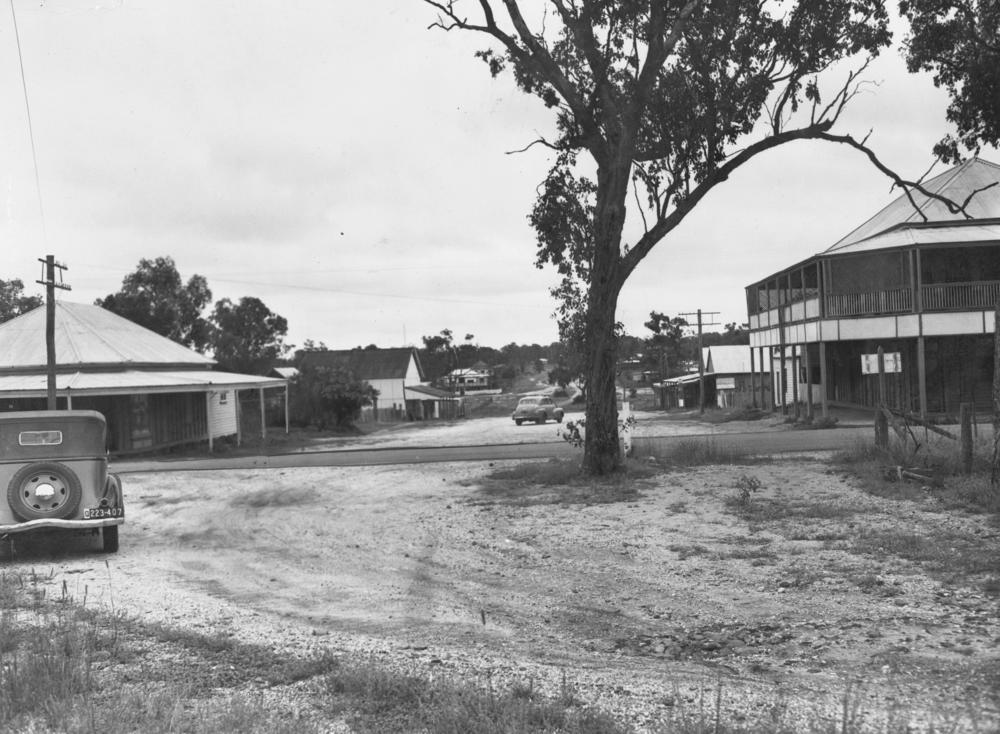
- Risien Street, Blair Athol, 1950

- Coordinates: 22.6969°S 147.5456°E
- Country: Australia
- State: Queensland
- LGA: Isaac Region
- Location: 22.1 km (13.7 mi) NNW of Clermont (town); 281 km (175 mi) SW of Mackay; 395 km (245 mi) WNW of Rockhampton; 957 km (595 mi) NNW of Brisbane
- Established: 1863
- Postcode: 4721

Blair Athol is a former town within Clermont in the Isaac Region, Queensland, Australia. It was obliterated by the development of the Blair Athol coal mine.

== History ==
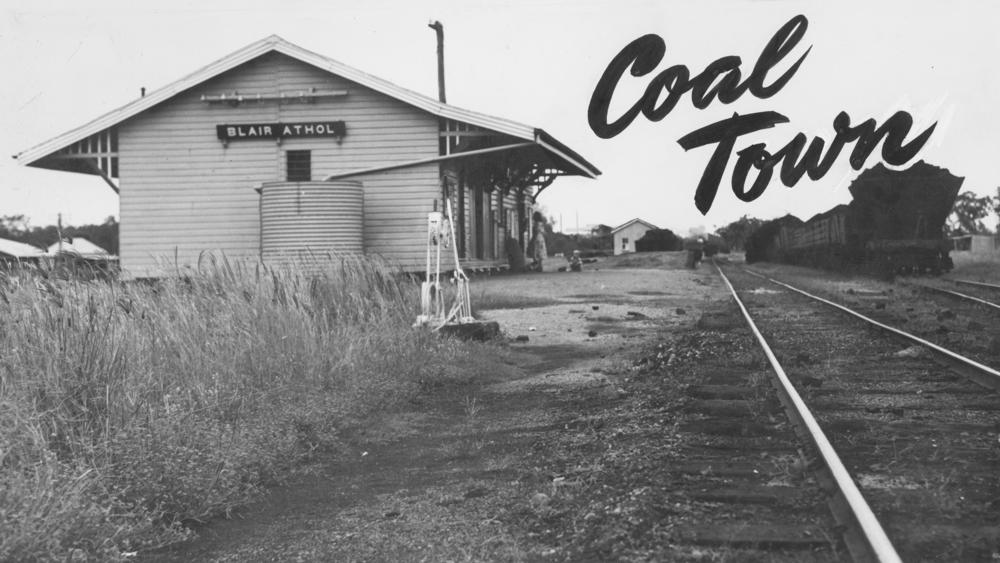
Blair Athol railway station, 1950

Early settler James MacLaren took up a pastoral run in the area in 1863 and named it Blair Athol after the village Blair Atholl, the location of Blair Castle of the Duke of Atholl in Scotland. While sinking a well in 1864, he discovered coal on the property.

By 1873, early shafts were dug, revealing extensive seams of coal. At that time, around 100 people were living in the town and there was a hotel, although no township had been officially surveyed. The town was surveyed in 1878.

Town map, Blair Athol, 1953

Blair Athol Provisional School opened on 6 November 1893. In 1894, 5 acres (2.0 ha) were reserved for a school. In 1903, it had an average attendance of over 30 students. It became a State School in 1909. In 1911, tenders were called to relocate and extend the school building as up to 150 students were expected due to expansion of the mine and the new town survey (around the Blair Athold railway station opened in 1910) meant that the school needed to be moved to a more central location. In 1918, funding was approved to build a new school.

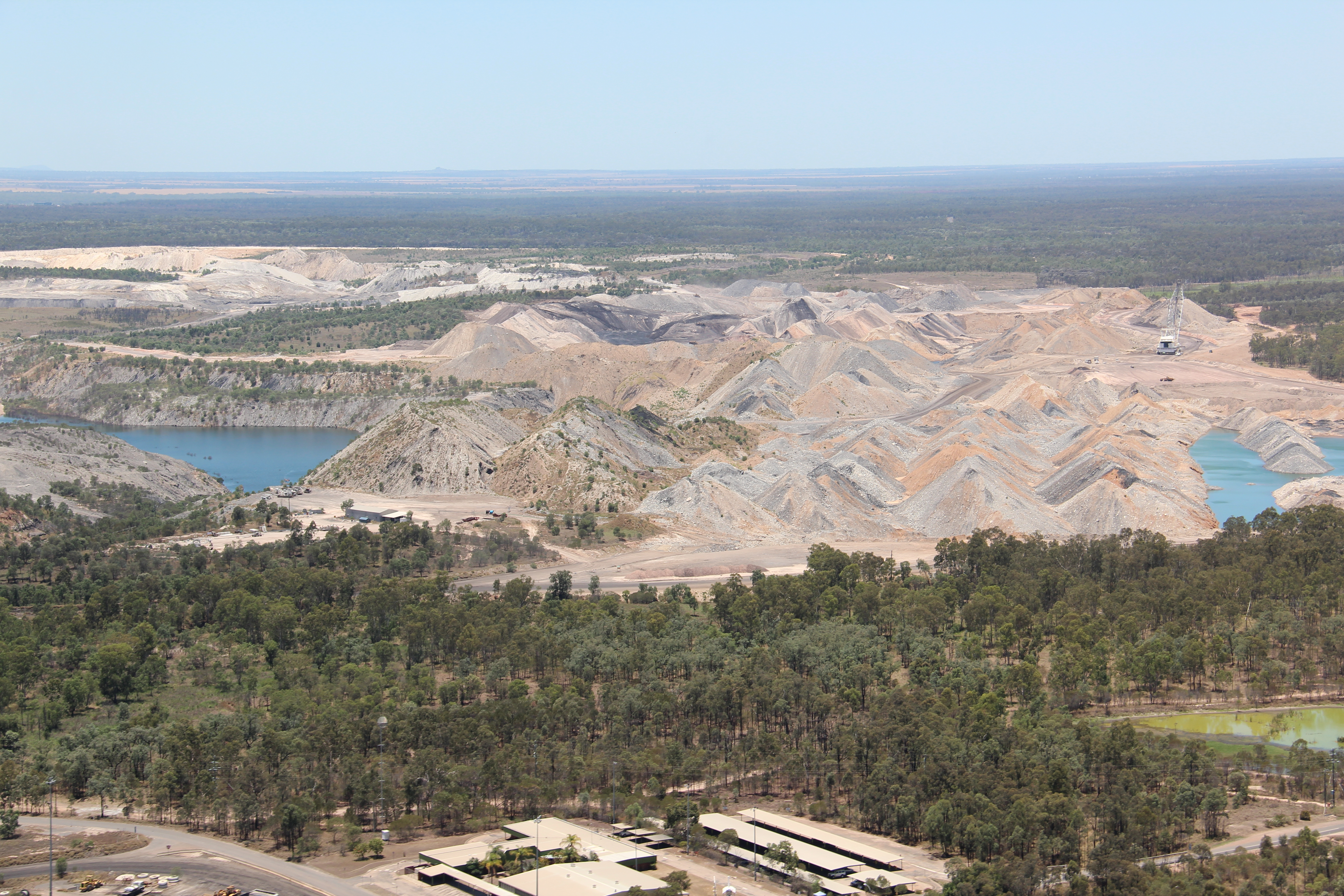
Blair Athol, 2012

On 18 May 1922, the Queensland Governor Matthew Nathan officially opened Australia's first open cut mine at Blair Athol.

Blair Athol Post Office opened on 1 July 1927 (a receiving office had been open from 1910) and closed in 1966.

By the 1970s, it became apparent that there were significant coal seams under the town. In order to construct an open cut mine, the town had to be sacrificed.

The school closed on 31 December 1974.

In 1981, a reunion was held at the community hall to mark the final end of the town, following which all of the town was demolished. Only the cemetery remains.
