= Peak Downs Telegram =

Newspaper in Clermont, Queensland, Australia

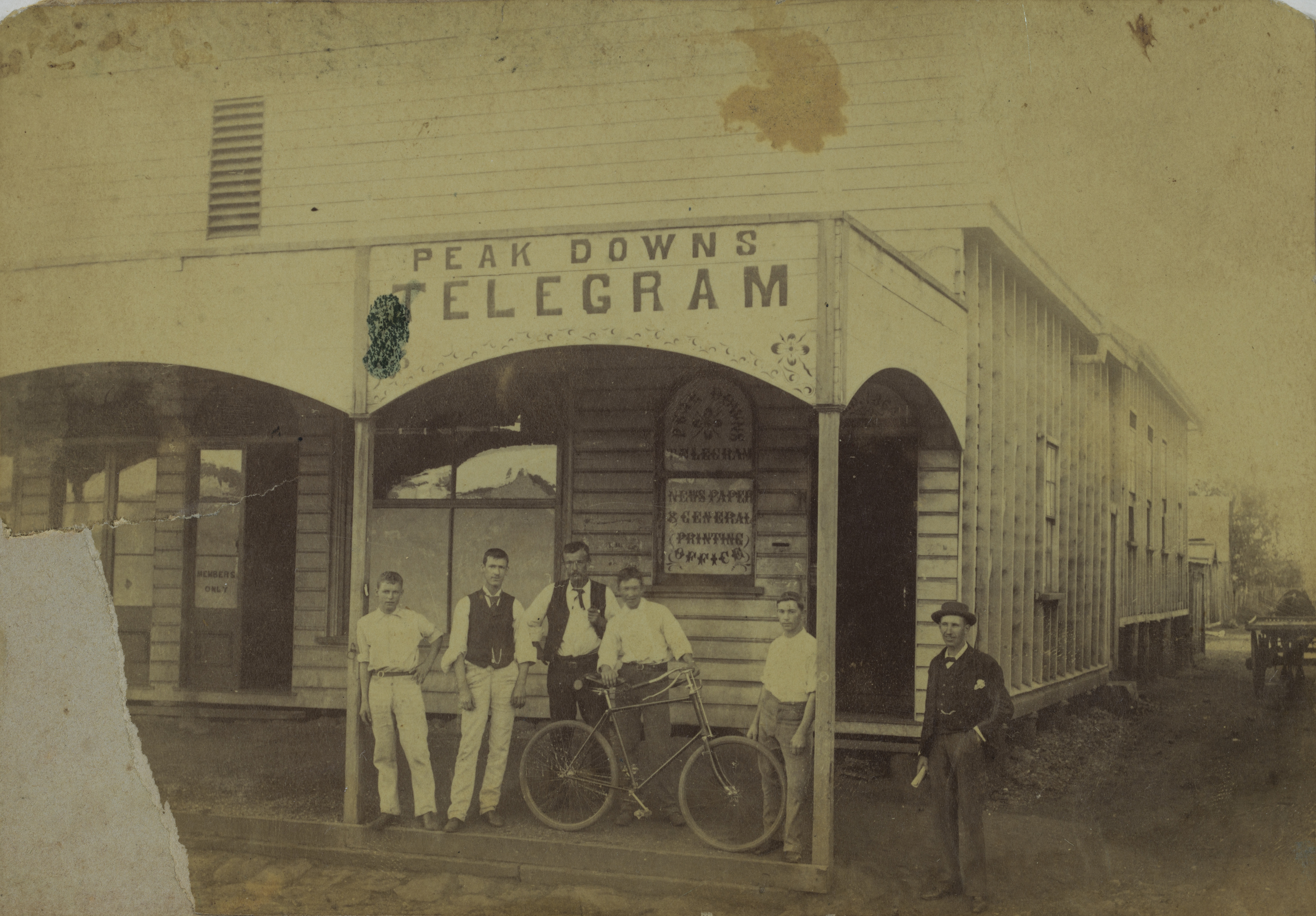
Peak Downs Telegram Office

The Peak Downs Telegram (later the Clermont Telegram) was a newspaper published in Clermont, Queensland, Australia.

== History ==
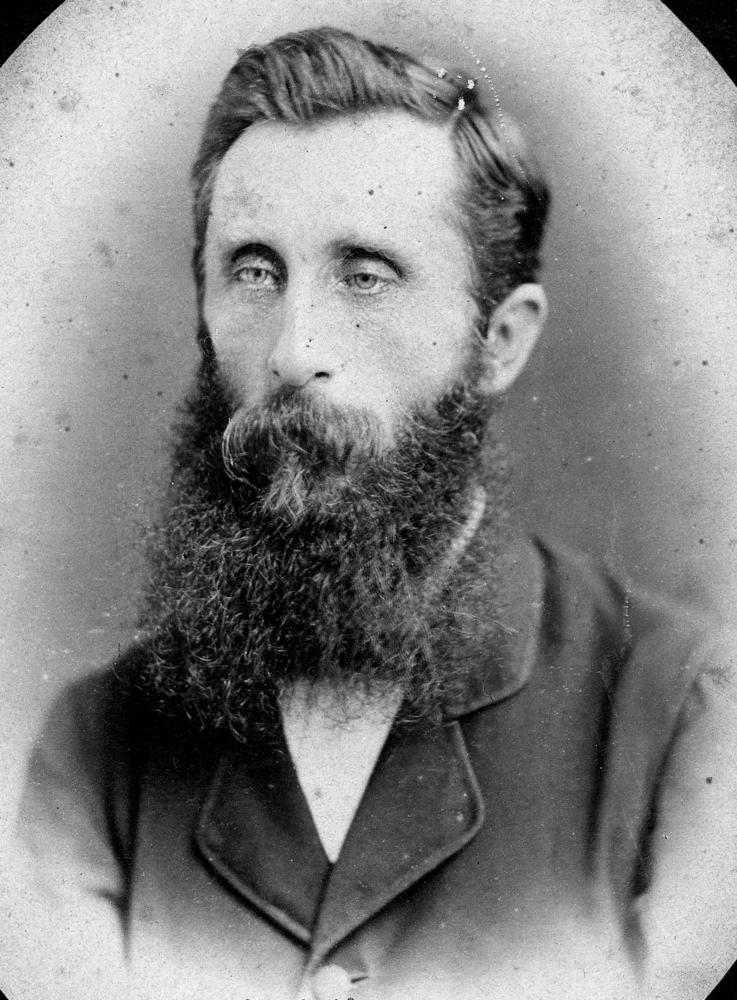
Charles Hardie Buzacott, 1879

The Peak Downs Telegram was started by Charles Hardie Buzacott and E. J. Fried on 2 August 1864. Buzacott, however, disposed of his interests in the journal and moved to Gladstone to start the Gladstone Observer in 1869. The last issue of the Peak Downs Telegram appeared on 18 December 1943.

The Clermont Telegram commenced on 10 March 1950 and continued until 6 May 1981. It was purchased in 1980 by the Gibson family who owned the Central Queensland News published in Emerald.
