= Batanghari Regency =

Regency in Jambi, Indonesia

Batanghari Regency Kabupaten Batanghari
- Regency
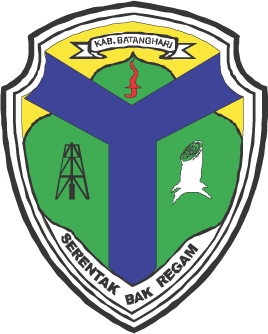
- Coat of arms
- Motto: Serentak Bak Regam (Together as a rhythm)

- Location in Sumatra
- Coordinates: 2°1′S 103°20′E
- Country: Indonesia
- Province: Jambi
- Regency seat: Muara Bulian

Government
  - Regent: Muhammad Fadhil Arief
  - Vice Regent: Bakhtiar

Area
  - Total: 5,804.83 km^{2} (2,241.26 sq mi)

Population (mid 2025 estimate)
  - Total: 320,281
  - Density: 55.1749/km^{2} (142.902/sq mi)
- Time zone: UTC+7 (WIB)
- Website: batangharikab.go.id

Batanghari (Indonesian: Kabupaten Batang Hari, literally "Stick of the Day Regency") is a regency of Jambi Province in Sumatra, Indonesia. It originally covered a wider area, but on 4 October 1999 this was split between a new Muaro Jambi Regency in the east (surrounding the city of Jambi) and a reduced Batang Hari Regency in the west, which now covers an area of 5,804.83 km^{2}. It had a population of 241,334 at the 2010 census and 301,700 at the 2020 census; the official estimate as of mid 2025 was 320,281 (comprising 162,969 males and 157,312 females). The administrative capital is the town of Muara Bulian (meaning "Bulian Estuary" or "Bulian Delta").

== Administrative districts ==
The regency is split administratively into eight districts (kecamatan), listed below with their areas and their populations at the 2010 census and the 2020 census, together with the official estimates as of mid 2025. The table also includes the locations of the district centres, the number of villages in each district (a total of 110 rural desa and 14 urban kelurahan), and their post codes.

| Kode Wilayah | Name of District (kecamatan) | Area in km^{2} | Pop'n census 2010 | Pop'n census 2020 | Pop'n estimate mid 2025 | Admin centre | No. of villages | Post codes |
|---|---|---|---|---|---|---|---|---|
| 15.04.01 | Mersam | 801.90 | 26,396 | 33,246 | 35,405 | Kembang Paseban | 18 ^{(a)} | 36654 |
| 15.04.06 | Maro Sebo Ulu | 906.33 | 29,305 | 39,588 | 43,612 | Simpang Sungai Rengas | 17 ^{(b)} | 36652 |
| 15.04.04 | Batin XXIV | 904.14 | 25,423 | 31,749 | 33,672 | Muara Jangga | 17 ^{(c)} | 36656 |
| 15.04.02 | Muara Tembesi | 419.77 | 27,233 | 33,894 | 35,888 | Kampung Baru | 14 ^{(d)} | 36653 |
| 15.04.03 | Muara Bulian | 417.97 | 55,132 | 68,960 | 73,192 | Muara Bulian | 21 ^{(e)} | 36611 ^{(f)} |
| 15.04.07 | Bajubang | 1,203.51 | 35,249 | 41,957 | 43,477 | Bajubang | 10 ^{(g)} | 36615 |
| 15.04.08 | Maro Sebo Ilir | 129.06 | 12,946 | 15,321 | 15,832 | Terusan | 8 ^{(h)} | 36655 |
| 15.04.05 | Pemayung | 1,022.15 | 29,650 | 36,985 | 39,203 | Jembatan Mas | 19 ^{(i)} | 36657 |
| | Total Regency | 5,804.83 | 241,334 | 301,700 | 320,281 | Muara Bulian | 124 | |

Notes: (a) including the kelurahan of Kembang Paseban. (b) including the kelurahan of Simpang Sungai Rengas.
(c) including the two kelurahan of Durian Luncuk and Muara Jangga. (d) including the kelurahan of Kampung Baru and Pasar Muara Tembesi.
(e) including the five kelurahan of Muara Bulian, Pasar Baru, Rengas Condong, Sridadi and Teratai.
(f) except the desa of Rambahan and kelurahan of Teratai (which share the postcode of 36612), the kelurahan of Muara Bulian (postcode of 36613) and the kelurahan of Sridadi (postcode of 36614).
(g) including the kelurahan of Bajubang. (h) including the kelurahan of Terusan. (i) including the kelurahan of Jembatan Mas.

== Towns and villages ==
- Muara Bulian – regency capital
- Paalmerah
- Talang Pelempang
- Pinangtinggi
- Bejubang
- Tempino
- Talang Gudang
- Muara Bahar
