= Jambi uprising =

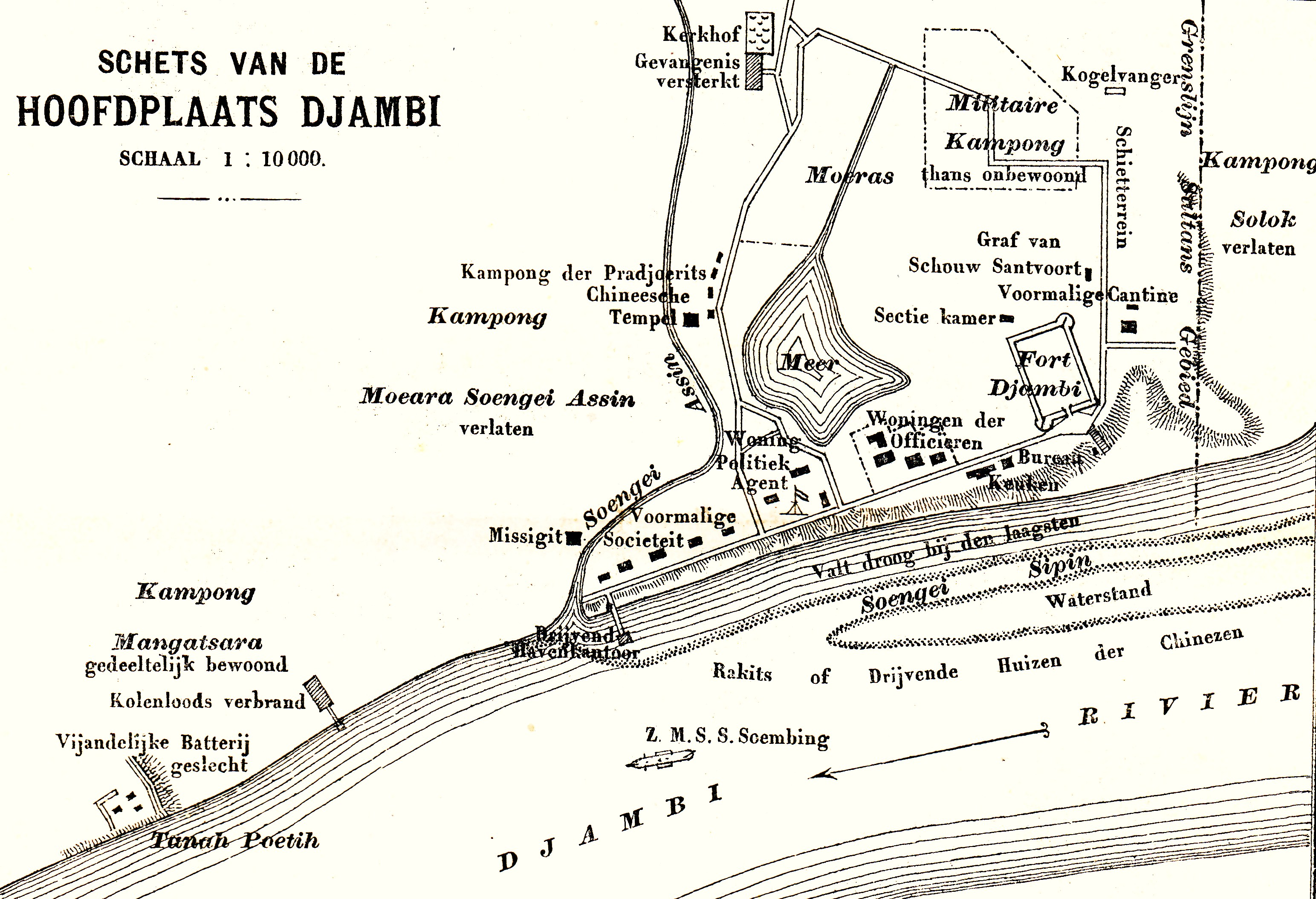
An old Dutch map of Jambi

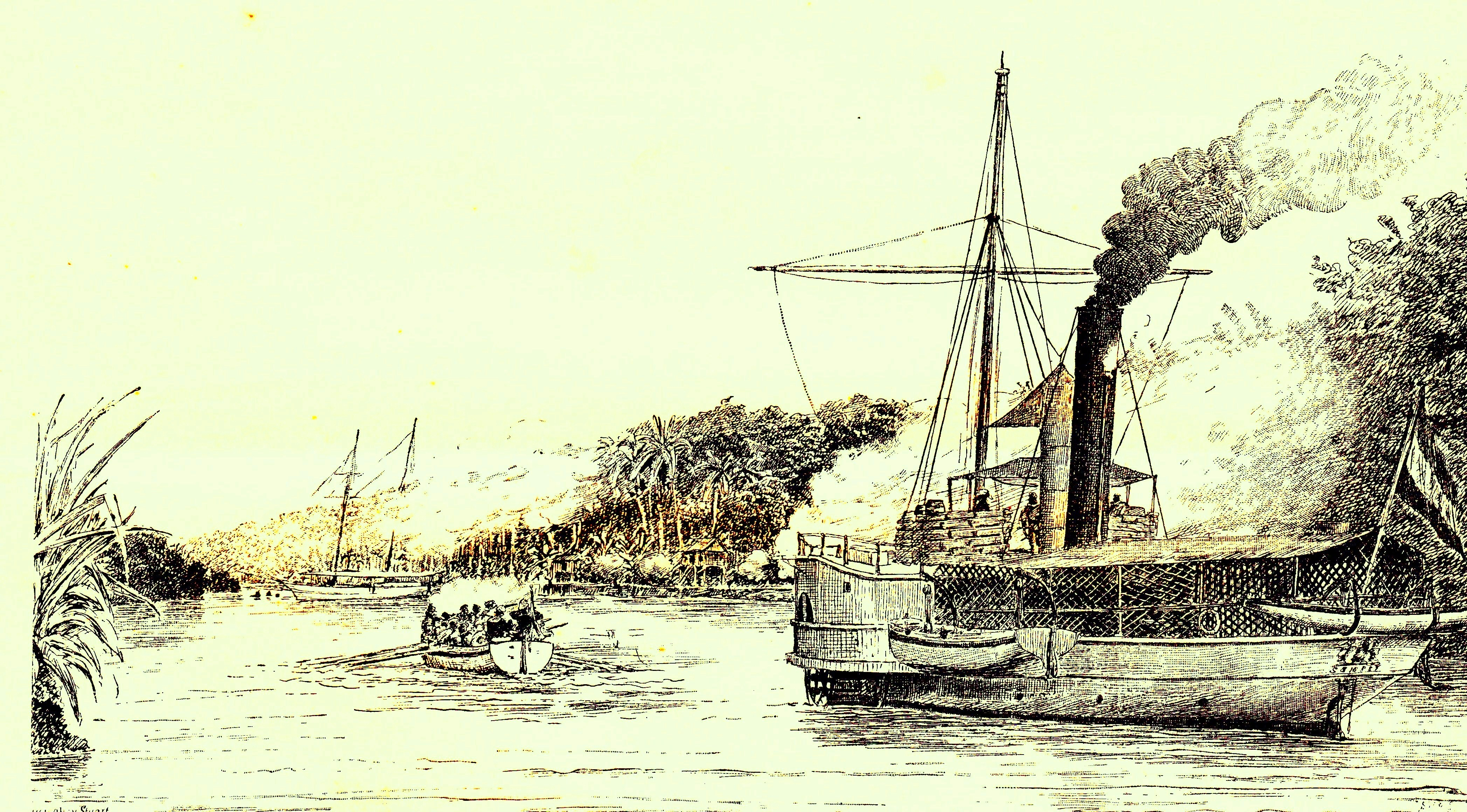
The Sampit and an armed sloop fighting to recapture Cruiser #12. Drawing by Lt. W.J. Cohen Stuart

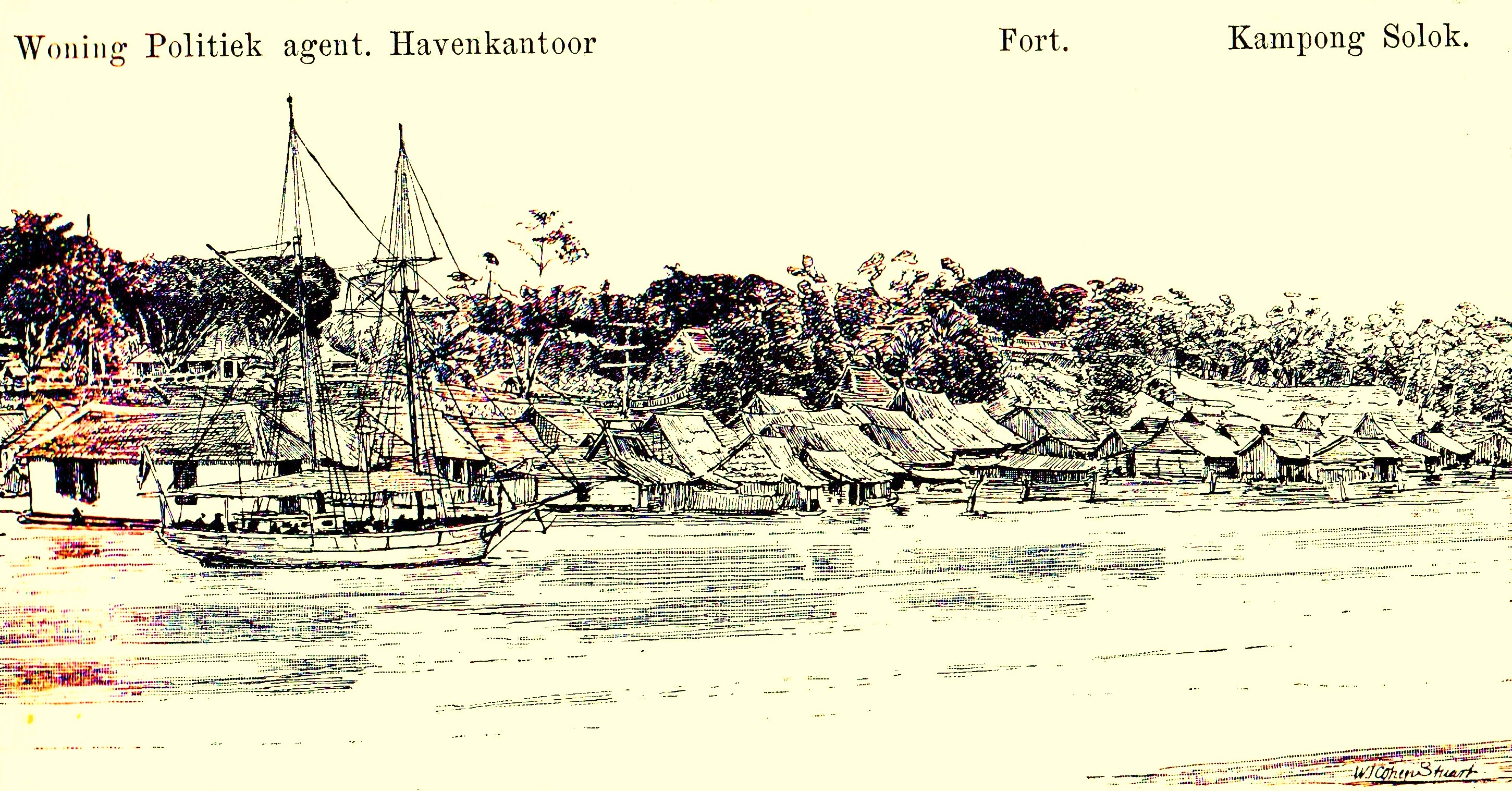
Jambi as seen from the river, drawing by Lt. W.J. Cohen Stuart

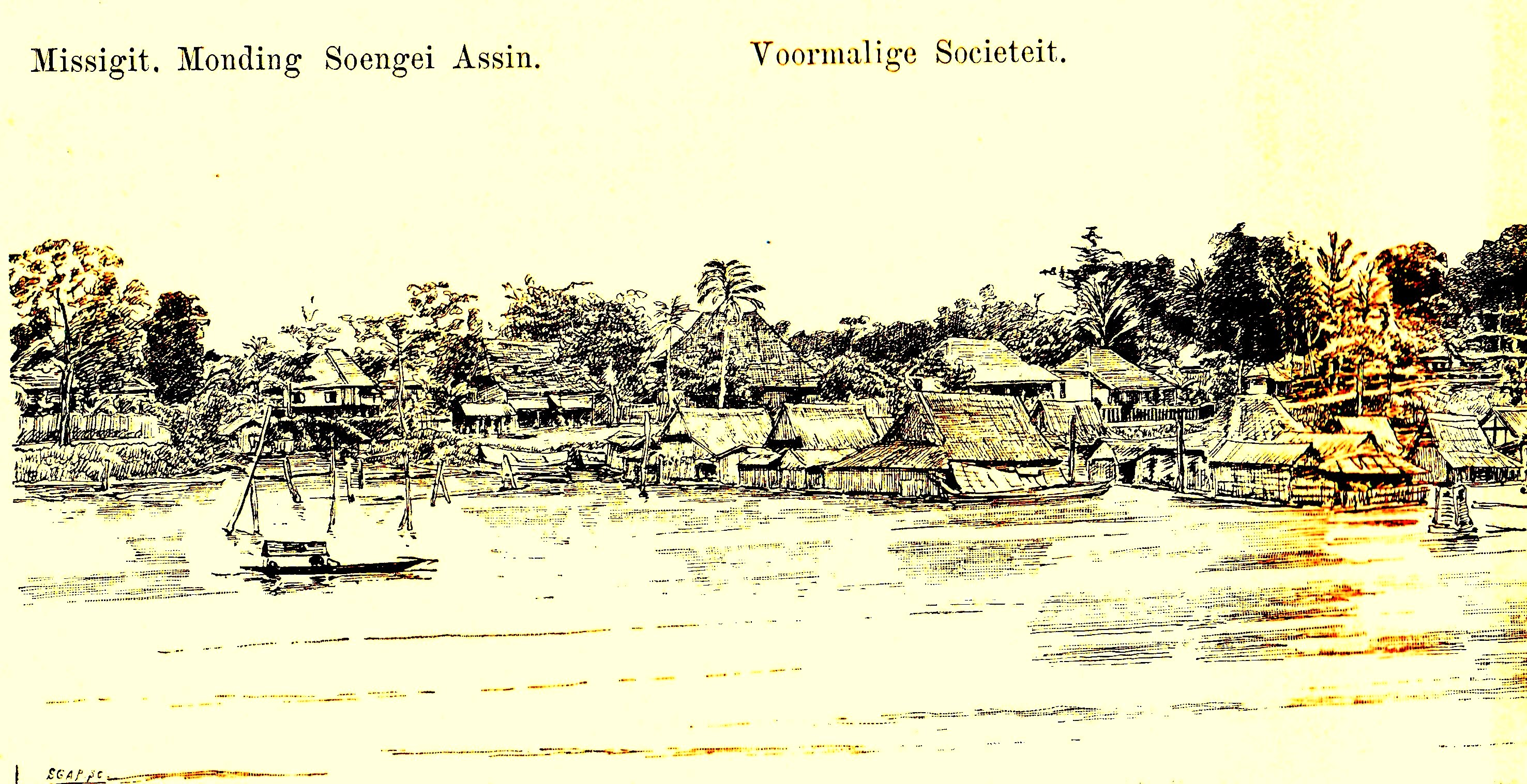
Jambi as seen from the river, drawing by Lt. W.J. Cohen Stuart

The Jambi uprising (1885) was a revolt in the Jambi Sultanate, modern Indonesia, which was put down by the Royal Netherlands Indies Army.

== Background ==
In 1835, the Sultan of Jambi sought protection from the Dutch government, against his vassals, which he could no longer keep under control. In exchange for protection, the Sultan signed a contract recognising the superiority of the Netherlands. The peace brought about by this agreement lasted until 1855, when Sultan Ratoe Thaha Syaifuddin (known as Taha), came into power. He was firmly against accepting Dutch superiority, which resulted in his dismissal in 1858. The rest of the government was forced to partake in an expedition to Jambi. This expedition involved taking the Kraton, with great losses, while Taha himself fled to the interior, where he remained until 1885. The government appointed a new sultan, Ratoe Ahmad Natsaroe 'd-din, an uncle of Taha. As an intermediary between the government and the sultan, a political agent was added, who resided in the Dutch settlement in Jambi. Despite no longer being sultan, Taha maintained a high level of authority over the Jambinese in the highlands. The Dutch settlements in Jambi merely controlled a part of the capital, and the villages of Moewara Kompeh and Moewara Saba.

In November 1880, 20 loaded guns were stolen from the controller's residence in Jambi; the theft was attributed to Taha's party. In 1881, Sultan Ahmad died and was succeeded by the then-state administrator Pangeran Ratoe, as sultan Mahidin, named Mahomed; he was the son-in-law of the expelled Taha. Taha Pangeran Soerio's brother, Ahmed, was appointed state administrator with the title Tjitra Mangrat. The new sultan failed to keep Taha under control, seeing him maintain his authority in the interior and defy the proposals of the Dutch government, during this period.

== Prelude ==
On 10 April 1885, Sultan Mahalin died, marking the start of a series of disturbances. On the evening of 23 May, while state officials were starting to become integrated accepted into society, and a political party was being formed at a state society, two armed men entered and opened fire. The Officer of Health, Dr. Heycop ten Ham was killed, while the Second Lieutenant Buenink and the dispatcher Jackson, were seriously injured. Buenink later died of his injuries. Both perpetrators were sent by Panglima Poetih, a man already suspected of the murder of Assistant Resident, Van Amstel te Benkoelen. Panglima Petih allegedly named those he wanted killed first, then ordered the murderers to continue firing. They managed to escape before security forces could capture them.

As soon as the news of the murder reached Palembang, the paddle steamer MS Soembing, commanded by Lieutenant Commander A. van Hengel departed Palembang with the Resident, the military commander and a group of soldiers and other doctors on board. Upon arrival of the Resident, the murderers were found and arrested, and Panglima Poetih was captured. After the extradition, the Resident and military commander returned to Palembang, while the MS Soembing remained stationed in front of Jambi. On the morning of 27 August, the political agent in Jambi, W.A. Palm, brought news that in the night of 21 and 22 August, about 300 armed Jambinese had been spotted. The MS Soembing immediately returned to Palembang to collect more soldiers and strengthen the defences in Jambi. On the morning of 28 August, at approximately 4 a.m., approximately 60 armed Jambinese attacked. The military commander in Jambi, Captain P.D.W. Wilken had taken precautionary measures, to prepare for the attack. The attack party was led by Raden Anom, who was married to Taha's niece. He was told by Taha that they were to fight against the occupation of Jambi because the firearms, cannons and other weapons could not be used anywhere else anyway. They continuously shot at Dutch troops throughout the month of September.

== Intensification of the uprising ==
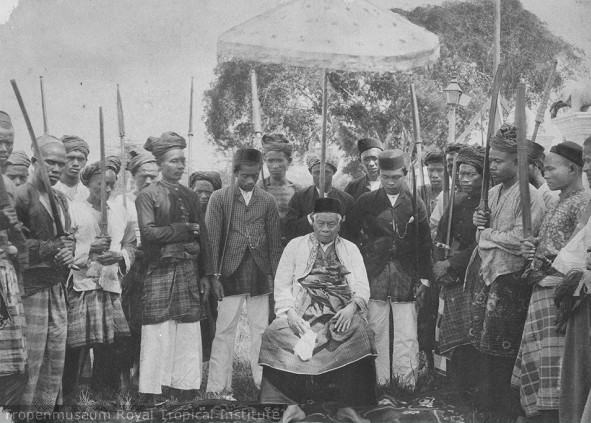
Group Portrait of Sultan Thaha Syaifuddin Jambi and his followers.

In the night of 1 and 2 October, Jambinese set fire to the Dutch coal reserves. The political society was also heavily under fire. The army countered these attacks with well-maintained gunfire, while the MS Soembing threw grenades in Soengi Assem. The party led by Raden Anom fired a number of cannon shots. Of the coal reserves, 230,000 kg were lost. On 4 October, the same party came under fire from the Solok village, allowing the MS Soembing to fire 20 grenades from just 16 and 12m distance. On 26 October, news arrived that a cruiser stationed there had been taken by four hijackers in Saba. Lieutenant 1st class A.P. Tadema, commander of the MS Soembing, immediately sent the government ship, Sampit, captained by L.J.C. Cocheret de la Moriniere, and an armed sloop, under the command of Lieutenant 2nd class C. Beels. They were tasked with recapturing the lost ship as quickly as possible. The steam boat Pontaniak, led by Lieutenant 1st class P.M.W.T. Krayenhoff van de Leur, left Palembang with the same mission. The ships entered the Dendang river, and were quickly fired upon by the captured cruiser, but managed to counter the fire with their cannons. This led to the recapturing of the cruiser. On the way back, the ships again came under fire and a sailor, De Jong, was killed. The enemy continued to harass Dutch ships, culminating in an attack on 14 November when the steamship Ophir, of the Dutch East India Company, took heavy fire in a village about an hour away from Jambi. On the nights of 21 and 22 November, the MS Soembing also took heavy fire. The attacks ceased only when the MS Pontaniak arrived to assist the Soembing.

The following morning, the bases from which the attacks were being launched were discovered and destroyed, ending the revolution.
