= Datuk Puduko Berhalo =

King of Jambi Kingdom

Ahkmad Barus II
- Datuk Paduko Berhalo
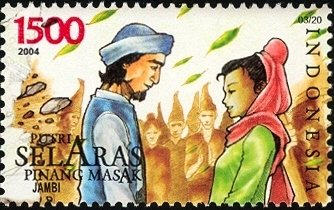
- Datuk Paduko Berhalo and Putri Selaras Pinang Masak, on a 2004 postage stamp

1st Raja of Jambi
- Reign: 1460–1480
- Successor: Sayyid Ibrahim
- Co-ruler: Putri Selaras Pinang Masak
- Born: Ottoman Empire (present day Turkey)
- Died: Berhala Island, Jambi (present day Riau Islands)
- Spouse: Putri Selaras Pinang Masak
- Issue: Orang Kayo Pingai; Orang Kayo Kedataran; Orang Kayo Hitam; Orang Kayo Gemuk
- Religion: Islam

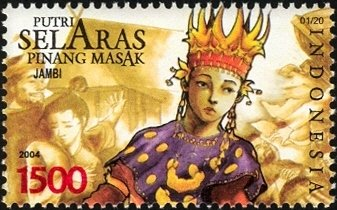
Putri Selaras Pinang Masak on a 2004 postage stamp

Tuanku Ahmad Salim or Ahkmad Barus II, commonly known by his Malay title Datuk Paduko Berhalo, was the founder and first king of the Kingdom of Jambi, he originated from the Ottoman Empire. He ruled from 1460 to 1480, with his wife, Putri Selaras Pinang Masak. In the Malay community of Jambi, he has become part of the communal memory and mythology.

== Reign (1460-1480) ==
Different sources stated that his name is either Tuanku Ahmad Salim (a Gujarati) or Ahkmad Barus II (a Turkish sultan's son, thought that he was spreading Islam through his travels, but he ended himself stuck on the island). He took the title Datuk Paduko Berhalo and established a new administration. In Jambi, he eventually wed Putri Salaro Pinang Masak (a royalty from Pagaruyung), who lives in Ujung Jabung. In 1460 AD, Datuk Paduko reigned as Berhalo.

Up to that point, they both led the Malay Peninsula to its current state. The people of Jambi refer to the two as Orang Kayo Pingai (Sayyid Ibrahim), Orang Kayo Kadataran, Orang Kayo Hitam, and Orang Kayo Gemuk. Even though Paduka Berhalo married a queen from the Sumatra mainland, it is reported that he still makes frequent trips to the island.

After Adityawarman died in 1375 AD, the Pagaruyung Kingdom started to vanish from history. The Kingdom of Jambi was founded up until that point. In the dispute with the Srivijaya kingdom, neither the Kingdom of Jambi nor the Malay Kingdom of Jambi is connected to the government of Datuk Paduko Berhalo, Orang Kayo Hitam or Sultan Thaha. Buddhists also attribute the fall of the Jambi Malay Kingdom, also known as the Jambi Kingdom, to the existence of temples in Muara Jambi. Orang Kayo Hitam, who led the Kingdom of Jambi under Datuk Paduko Berhalo, are Muslim, nevertheless. It was rumored that Hantu Island became Berhalo Island during his rule.

On the island in the archipelago where he ultimately died. Orang Kayo Pingai took over as head of the Jambi Sultanate after his death. The burial of Puteri Tun Pinang Masak lay in the Kumpeh region.

== Tomb ==
One of Berhala Island's eight cultural heritage sites is the Tomb of Datuk Paduko Berhala. The mausoleum, Tomb of Datuk Paduka Berhala, is situated apart from the residential complex on a hill that is around 10 metres (33 ft) high. The mausoleum is situated in the southern region, close to the residential area. It is officially the property of the Regency Government on the Riau Islands. The Tomb of Datuk Paduka Berhala is one of the graves located there.

Regnal titles
Preceded by Position established	Raja of Jambi; 1460–1480	Succeeded by Sayyid Ibrahim
