= Jambi Sultanate =

Sultanate located in Sumatra from 1615 to 1904

Sultanate of Jambi كسلطانن جمبي Kesultanan Jambi
- 1460/1615–1904
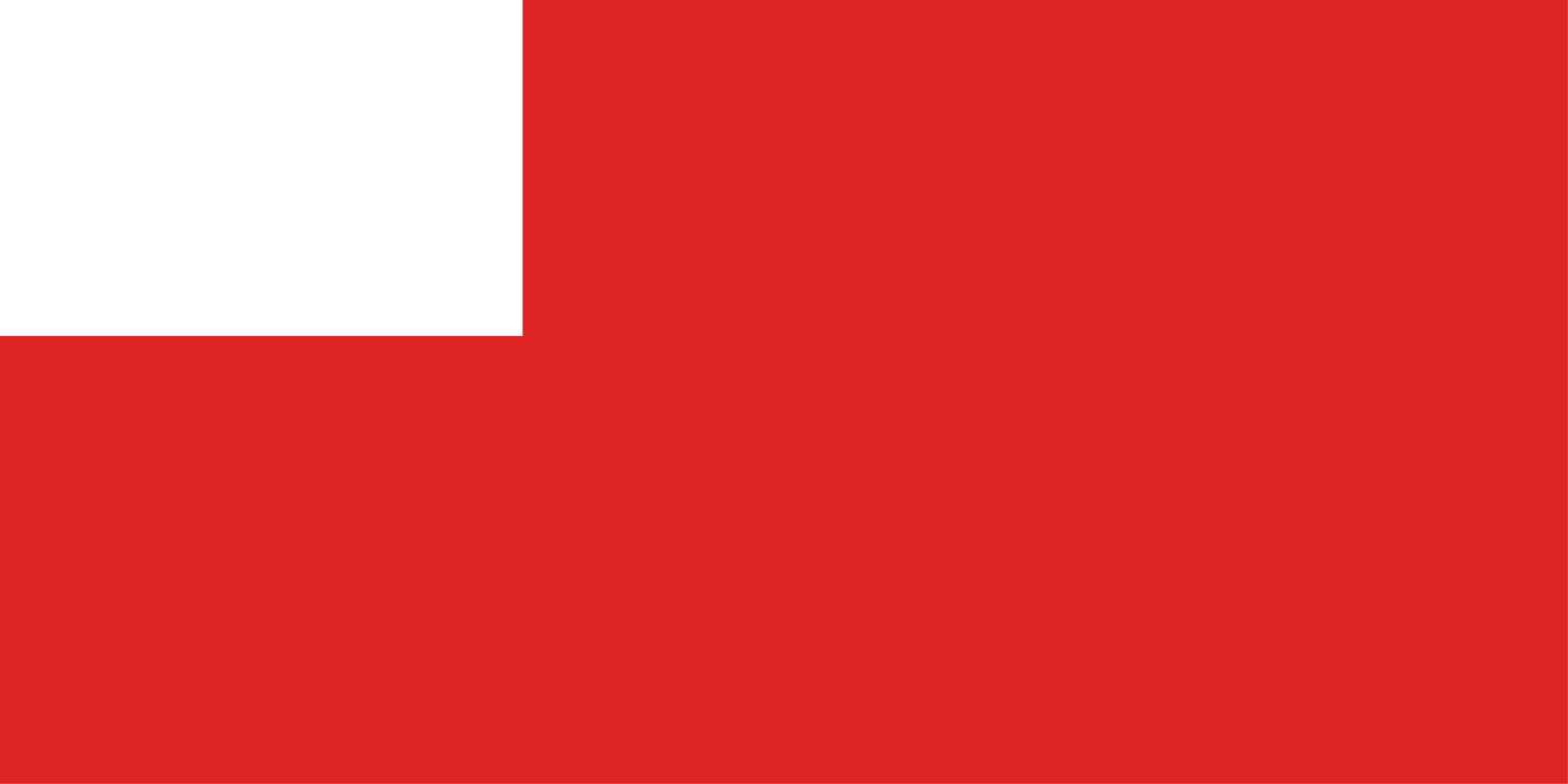
- Left: Flag of the Sultan and war flag of Jambi; Right: Flag of the Commercial Nobility of Jambi
- Status: Kingdom (1460–1615); Sultanate (1615–1904)
- Capital: Tanah Pilih
- Common languages: Malay; Javanese (court language); Jambi Malay
- Ethnic groups: Jambi Malays; Batin; Kubu; Orang Laut; Minangkabau; Javanese; Chinese; Arabs
- Religion: Sunni Islam
- Demonym: Jambian/Jambinese
- Government: Monarchy
- Sultans
  - 1460–1480: Datuk Puduko Berhalo and Putri Selaras Pinang Masak (first)
  - 1900–1904: Sultan Thaha Syaifuddin (last)
- History
  - Established: 1460/1615
  - Disestablished: 1904

Population
  - 1852 estimate: 60,000
- Currency: Tin coins
Preceded by	Succeeded by
Majapahit	Dutch East Indies
- Today part of: Indonesia

The Jambi Sultanate (Jawi: كسلطانن جمبي, romanized: Kesultanan Jambi), alternatively known as Djambi, was a sultanate that was centered in the modern-day province of Jambi in Indonesia.

Initially part of the Majapahit Empire, Jambi broke away in the early 16th century and established the sultanate in 1615. The state's founder is believed to be Datuk Puduko Berhalo. The sultanate grew rich on pepper, gold and timber exports in the early 17th century, but would face decline in the early 18th century due to the aftermath of the Johor-Jambi war that occurred in the mid to late 17th century. The Dutch became more involved with the internal politics of the sultanate in the 19th century and would eventually conquer the sultanate and kill its last ruling sultan in 1904.

== History ==
=== Background ===
In the 7th century, there was an early reference to a Malay Kingdom based in Jambi, which was eventually absorbed into the Srivijaya empire as an independent trading community or a subject-region. An account associated the early history of the sultanate with the Islamization of Sumatra, citing that these two events roughly coincided in the fifteenth century.

In 852–853 and 871, Tang dynasty China received diplomatic missions from Jambi. While Song and Yuan dynasty Chinese porcelain were found in Muara Jambi, near Jambi city (Chan-pei or Zhanbei). In 1095, 1094, 1090, 1088, and 1084 China received diplomatic delegations from Jambi, and the Jambi (Zhanbei) ruler and his daughter sent cloth, camphor and two Chinese language letters to Guangzhou in 1082.

Local Muslim women who dealt in the cloth trade willingly married Han Chinese men in Palembang and Jambi and also local Muslim women in Banten married Han Chinese men. The Han Chinese men converted to Islam to please their Muslim wives. The same Muslim women refused to deal or even meet with Dutch men especially in Palembang since the Dutch were infamous for sexually abusing indigenous Muslim women. Han Chinese merchants were a major rival of the Dutch in colonial Indonesia. Han Chinese interpreters advised the local Muslim king of Jambi to go to war against the Dutch, while the Dutch attacked Chinese ships and Thai ships to stop them from trading with the Muslims in Jambi and make them trade with the Dutch in Batavia. The Chinese continued to violate the Dutch ban on trade with Jambi.

The Dutch East India Company was also angered by Thailand trading with the Jambi Sultanate and the Jambi Sultanate sending pepper and flowers as tribute to Thailand. leading to tensions between Thailand the Dutch in 1663–1664 and 1680–1685. The Dutch wanted Chinese banned from Thai junks and were angry when a Thai ambassador in Iran took out a loan from the Dutch in Surat but didn't pay it back after his ship got repaired. The 1682 Dutch invasion of Banten (Bantam) in Indonesia also raised alarms in Thailand, so the Thai King Narai courted the French to counter the Dutch. Dutch East India Company attacked Zheng Zhilong's junks which were trading pepper with Jambi, but while the Dutch transferred 32 Chinese prisoners into the Dutch ship, the remaining Chinese managed to slaughter the 13 Dutch sailors on board the Chinese junk and retake the vessel. Zheng Zhilong demanded the Dutch then release the 32 Chinese in 1636. Dutch East India Company blockaded Thai trade in 1664 and in 1661–1662 seized a Thai junk owned by a Persian official in Thailand. The Dutch tried to impede Thai and Chinese competition with the Dutch in the pepper trade at Jambi. The Jambi Sultan temporarily jailed English merchants during violence between the Dutch and English. The Thai and Jambi Sultanate angrily complained against the Dutch over Dutch attacks and attempts to impede Jambi's trade with Chinese and Thai. Chinese junks regularly traded with Jambi, Patani, Siam and Cambodia.

The title of Shahbandar was held by Han Chinese in Jambi and Japara as Chinese came to those cities and Bantam to trade in pepper. If the 15th century there were Chinese in Surabaya and in the late half of the 14th century there were Chinese in Grise and in the 14th century there were Chinese in Tumasik. Jambi was visited every year by Chinese for pepper that came from the Sumatra Minangkabau highlands. Palembang also exported pepper.

Commerce in Jambi was dominated by Chinese merchants and local Jambi people also benefited from renting out to rubber plantations.

=== Era of prosperity ===
Jambi was part of Majapahit from the mid-14th century until it broke away in the early 16th century. The sultanate's access to natural resources as well as its strategic location, particularly its proximity to the Strait of Malacca, allowed it to flourish and be involved in international trade. In the 17th century, Jambi was extremely prosperous. By 1616, it was known as the second-largest Sumatran port after Aceh, and this prosperity continued until the 1670s.

Pepper drove the growth of Jambi's prestige, and pepper cultivation grew rapidly. By the 1630s, the Batang Hari as far down as Muara Ketalo was being used for pepper cultivation, starting to be grown in Tembesi as well. Aside from pepper, Jambi also exported gold and forest products such as beeswax, resin, and timber.

At around 1615, Jambi became a sultanate. In the same year, the English and Dutch established trading posts in Jambi. However, the wealth of Jambi made it a target for other powers. Jambi suffered difficulties feeding its people. As pepper growth took over much of the arable land, rice production was extremely limited. In essence, Jambi was dependent on Java for adequate supplies of rice. Efforts by Jambian rulers to encourage rice production failed due to pepper's high returns. As a result, during times of low yield or trade embargoes in Java, Jambi would suffer. In 1631, because of a Javanese trade embargo with Palembang, the sultan of Jambi had to ban the production of arak.

In 1641, the ruler of Palembang made submission to Mataram after a fleet of 300 ships showed up at Palembang. Due to Mataram's massive military might, Jambi's economic dependence on Java for rice, and Jambi's high regard for Javanese culture, in 1642 Pangeran Ratu would accept Mataram's overlordship. Until the 1660s, Jambi would remain a vassal of Mataram.

By 1682, Jambi was disputed as a vassal state between the Dutch East India Company (VOC) and the Kingdom of Siam.

The Jambi Sultanate was involved in the Brunei Civil War by selling gunpowder to Muhyiddin (the future sultan of Brunei), who would later defeat Abdul Hakkul Mubin in Pulau Cermin. In the aftermath of the conflict, Jambi would become a destination for Bruneian troops.

=== Jambi-Johor War ===
Jambi took advantage of the Acehnese invasion of Johor to seize Tungkal, a disputed district on the border with Johor. Despite a 1629 Johorese attempt to seek its return, Tungkal remained under Jambian sovereignty until a pro-Johorese rebellion forced them out in 1655. Eventually, it was decided that Jambi and Johor should settle their disagreements through marriage. In 1659, the Raja Muda of Johor, Raja Ibrahim, who himself was the son of a Jambi princess and a previous sultan, was married to the daughter of the Jambi sultan. Their marriage would be a happy one. During his year-long stay in Jambi, he encouraged the Sultan to break from Mataram's overlordship, which would allow Johor and Jambi to come to a long-term peace arrangement. Eventually, Jambi did break away from Mataram's overlordship in 1663/64.

The Sultan of Johor, Abdul Jalil, became distrustful of Raja Ibrahim and the Jambi elite. He sent a fleet which extradited Raja Ibrahim from Jambi in September 1660. He feared Raja Ibrahim as a potential threat to his position, who could possibly be supported by the combined forces of Jambi and Mataram, and sought Dutch assistance if such a conflict ever arose. This suspicion was likely fueled by the Laksamana Tun Abdul Jamil of Johor, a close confidant of the Sultan, who stood to directly benefit from the conflict.

In May 1665, a Jambian embassy demanded that Raja Ibrahim be allowed to return to his bride, or obtain a divorce. Soon afterwards, in 1666, conflict broke out between Jambi and Palembang. Raja Ibrahim came to Jambi's assistance and gathered his forces to attack Palembang. Raja Ibrahim and Jambi's fleets, however, got into a disagreement near Lingga. A battle broke out between the two sides, which ignited the conflict. The Dutch tried to mediate between the two sides; however they were unable to come to an agreement.

The war would be marked by Jambian and Johorese attempts to control the seas, "marked by an occasional show of force by either side against the other's capital". Although Johorese and Jambian forces would sometimes engage in pitched battles, the main aspects of the war were the constant daily attacks on shipping by pirates on both dies. As Johor and Jambi were both trading entrepots, and became prominent due to their ability to keep neighboring waters safe, these piratical activities were far more detrimental than any show of force made by the other side. In essence, the goal was to cut the other off from port revenues and eliminate their position as trade hubs by attacking any shipping in the nearby waters (including neutral parties), and decreasing their prestige.

In May 1667, a Johorese fleet destroyed the fishing huts and orchards at the mouth of the Jambi River, and later destroyed huts and a Dutch warehouse in Jambi. In August 1669, they again made a show of force at the mouth of the Jambi river, threatening future assaults. The Dutch fruitlessly tried to broker agreements between the two sides, as the conflict decreased revenue they were gaining from trade. In August 1670, Jambian forces raided Indragiri and Tungkal, taking 917 slaves in the process. The Johorese responded to this attack by burning kampongs and inflicting a defeat on Jambi downriver in January 1671.

Groups of Orang Laut, led by Sekam, deserted Johor and assisted the Jambians in attacking Johorese shipping. Abdul Jalil, threatened by Sekam, demanded his extradition to Johor. As the Dutch were allies of both Johor and Jambi, they desperately wanted to seek a peace arrangement. During the next round of peace negotiations, Abdul Jalil demanded that Jambi send envoys to Johor to explain themselves, in effect seeking Jambi's submission. Jambi was rightfully insulted, and attacks on both sides continued.

On April 4, 1673, while the Pangeran Ratu was away in Palembang preparing for a marriage between a Palembang princess and his son, Pangeran Dipati Anom, Anom led a surprise attack on Johor's capital. The city was burned and depopulated, with its population and many of Johor's elites fleeing to the jungle. The Bendahara of Johor was captured and taken back to Jambi as a war prize, along with other Johorese and some foreign merchants. Jambi also took advantage of the destruction to attack Rokan, Bengkalis, and Indragiri (although Indragiri managed to hold its own).

==== Involvement of the Bugis ====
Johor quickly recovered, with the Laksamana of Johor acting as a main rallying point for resistance. In late 1673, the Laksamana's forces inflicted a resounding defeat on Jambi. By 1674, Jambi was soon forced on the defensive, dealing with repeated Johorese assaults and with few allies able to assist them. As a result, Jambi soon turned to Makassarese refugees to aid them in the conflict.

With the defeat of the Gowa Sultanate by the Dutch in 1669, many royal Makassarese refugees fled across the archipelago and into Jambi and Palembang. This inflow of refugees would only be increased, as Arung Palakka's rule would become oppressive and very intrusive in the politics of the local kingdoms. The Jambi royal family had links with Southern Sulawesi, as the ruler of Jambi, Anom Ingalaga, had a Makassarese wife, Karaeng Fatimah. His mother was also from Makassar.

Sultan Ingalaga honored the Makassarese and gave their leader, a sister of Karaeng Fatimah, Daeng Mangika, the title of Pangeran Sutadilaga. The Makassarese would be equals to the Jambi ruler and would not be governed by Jambian law. However, this arrangement was inherently unstable and was bound to collapse. The continual flow of Makassarese and Buginese to Daeng Mangika from other regions of the archiplelago, such as in Java after the Trunajaya Rebellion, made the ruler of Jambi feel threatened and worsened relations between the two.

In May 1679, the Johorese launched an attack on Jambi with 300 ships. During the Johorese invasion, Daeng Mangika deserted Sultan Ingalaga, claiming that he did not fulfill the arrangement and treated him more like a governor than a ruler. With the assistance of Daeng Mangika and 300 Makassarese soldiers, they were able to break the Jambian blockade of the river, leaving Jambi's capital exposed. The Pangeran Dipati Anom was forced to pay the Laksamana 10,000 rijksaalders, two metal cannons, and compensate Johor by returning the gold and people taken from Jambian raids. Jambi was also forced to send two noble hostages to ensure the continued payment of these reparations. On October 17, 1679, Daeng Mangika fled to Palembang with his followers. In 1680, he would participate in a combined expedition with Palembang against Jambi, but was killed in action, ending Makassarese attempts to form a permanent base in the region.

=== Decline ===
The conflict between Jambi and Johor caused Jambi to lose its position as a major pepper-producing port and go on the decline. In 1688, Sultan Ingalaga would be arrested and deposed by the VOC. This act split Jambi in two: Lower Jambi based in Tanah Pilih, ruled by Kiai Gede and supported by the VOC, and Upper Jambi, ruled by Pangeran Pringgabaya, under the influence of the ruler of Pagaruyung and supported by the highlanders. In 1708, an arrangement was made that Kiai Gede would relinquish his authority and cede his position to Pringgabaya, which reunified Jambi. However, the sultanate had become extremely weakened with the decline of trade. In March 1768, the Dutch settlement in Jambi would be attacked by a hundred men acting on orders from the Sultan. By 1770, they had abandoned Jambi for good.

In the 18th century, driven by the pursuit of gold, Minangkabau migrants began steadily flooding into highland regions of Jambi, which would decrease Jambian control of these areas, as the local communities would seek contacts with other Minangkabau rulers or the King of Pagaruyung, rather than falling under Jambi's orbit. The Jambi Sultanate itself would become a vassal to Pagaruyung by the end of the 18th century. For the next couple of decades, the downstream areas of Jambi would continue to decline as trade stagnated, while the upstream districts remained thriving centers of commerce.

In 1811, a rebellion in the capital occurred against Sultan Mohildin due to his wife's treatment of some noble girls. Mohildin asked his brother for protection, who agreed on the condition that his son, Raden Tabun, would become Pangeran Ratu after the Sultan's death. Mohildin agreed but eventually declined the assistance, as his forces had already crushed the rebellion. In 1817/18, fighting emerged between Sultan Mohildin and his cousin, with few casualties. Mohildin was defeated by the latter, and he would not settle in Jambi for a while, even after his cousin was killed. Around 1820, the sultan controlled the Upper Tembesi, while the Pangeran Ratu controlled the Upper Batang Hari, at least nominally, as he spent much of his time in Palembang.

When Mohildin's son, Fakhruddin, became Sultan (between 1821 and 1829), he named his brother Pangeran Ratu, violating the previous agreement making Raden Tabun the Pangeran Ratu.

=== Partition and Dutch annexation ===
In the late 19th century the sultanate was slowly annexed by the Dutch, with the sultan degraded to a puppet ruler. This culminated in 1833 with the invasion of the Dutch-controlled Palembang by Jambi's Sultan, Mohammad Fakhruddin, which gave the Dutch the pretext to finally gain control of Jambi, forcing the sultan to accede to their authority and provide significant economic concessions. They hoped that this treaty would allow them to gain access to Upper Jambi's economic boom.

In 1855, Sultan Taha ascended to the throne of Jambi. He was a young and energetic sultan. However, by this time the Dutch had become more and more demanding. In 1858, an expedition was launched that deposed Sultan Taha within a day. He fled upstream into the region of Upper Jambi, while his uncle, Ahmad Nazaruddin, became the new ruler of Jambi. This divided Jambi into two competing areas: Upper and Lower, restoring a divide that had not existed since the early 18th century. Sultan Taha attempted, on multiple occasions, to seek the assistance of the Ottoman Empire (in 1857, 1902, and 1903), all of which became futile.

Lower Jambi would be governed by a succession of Dutch-controlled shadow rulers (Jawi: سلطان بايڠ, romanized: sultan bayang). Some of these rulers were: Ahmad Nazaruddin from 1858 to 1881, Mohildin from 1882 to 1885, and Zainuddin from 1886 to 1899. In 1899, Sultan Zainuddin was forced to abdicate, but the Jambian nobility refused to elect a new sultan. The resident of Palembang, as a result, took on the position of "Sultan" until 1903, when the sultanate was annexed into the Palembang Residency. The killing of Sultan Taha in 1904 marked the end of the Jambi Sultanate.

== Society and population ==
As a society, Jambi has a history of being an entrepot and a trading center that is open to outsiders. This is demonstrated in the way Jambi families easily incorporate outsiders, particularly men as well as foreigners (e.g. Chinese and Arab traders) through marriage into the Jambi womenfolk. For instance, a Jambi pengiran (prince) adopted a Dutch official as his son, resulting to kinship obligations between the Dutch and the royal family. The Melayu population was extremely diverse, whose identities were based on suku (lineage groups), usually identified with a certain district headed by local elites.

The Jambian court was heavily influenced by Javanese culture, partly out of desire to ally with Mataram. There is evidence of Jambian coins written in Javanese, which contrasts with the surrounding Malay states (which made coinage in Jawi). Javanese was spoken as a court language well into the 18th century.

Jambi was very sparsely populated. An 1852 estimate put the population at around 60,000. The marshy, low-level Eastern Jambi was almost entirely uninhabited.

Some of Jambi's ethnic groups include Jambi Malays, Batin, Kubu, Minangkabau, Javanese, Chinese, and Arabs.

== Administration and government structure ==
The Jambian monarchy did not practice direct succession. The Sultan of Jambi and the Pangeran Ratu (ڤڠيرن راتو, meaning crown prince) were elected by representatives of Jambi's four noble families: the Kraton, Kedipan, Perban, and the Raja Ampat Puluh (Jawi: راج امڤت ڤوله, lit: forty rajas). The candidates came from the largest family: the Kraton. The matriarch's social status determined the ranking of the candidates.

Like other Malay states, the Jambi sultan spent much of his time in leisure activities such as hunting or fishing, leaving the Pangeran Ratu to administer state affairs. The twelve-person Rapat XII council served the Pangeran Ratu for advisory and administrative functions. Its members came from the Jambian nobility (Jawi: انق راج; romanized: anak raja), including the heads of the four noble families.

The Jambi Sultanate's structure was quite decentralised, similar to concentric power circles than a rigid hierarchy. The Sultan owned all lands and in Jambi, in addition to mineral and forest resources. The rights to the lands could be granted or taken away by the Sultan, and a proportion of the yield had to be delivered to him. Land access was traditionally regulated by Adat.

The domains claimed by the Jambi sultan were known as "Jambi with its nine rivers", composing the Batang Tembesi, Merangin, Asai, Tebir, Tebo, Bungo, Uleh, Jujuhan, and Siau rivers. However, only the Jambian Malays (living along the Batanghari and part of the Tembesi rivers), and the population of Tungkal (composed of Javanese, Johorese, and Minangkabaus) were directly administered by the Sultan.

Regions like Sungai Tenang, Serampas, and (since the mid-18th century) Kerinci, functioned autonomously and the Jambi Sultanate had little influence in these areas. However, there is evidence of Jambi sultans writing edicts of land grants in Serampas. These lands and other regions of highland Jambi were major economic centers for pepper, and later gold.

== Gallery ==
Letter from the Sultan of Jambi containing his credentials

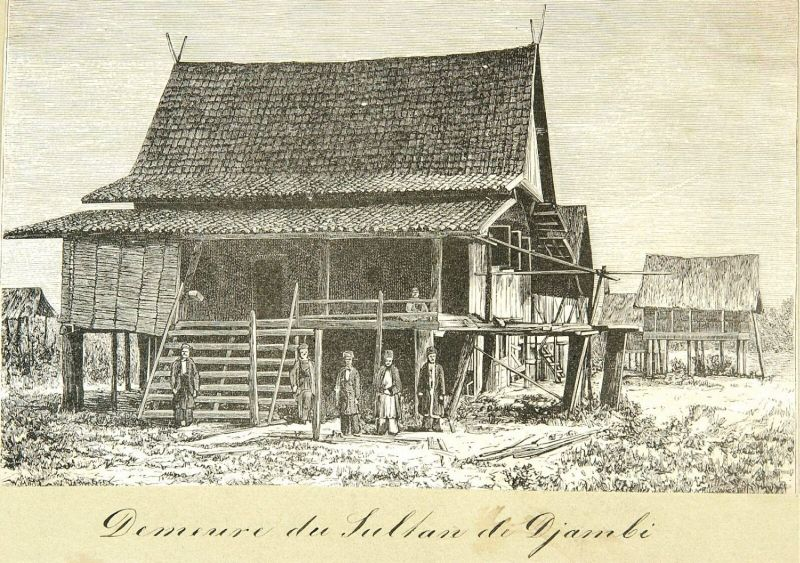
Engraving of the sultan's residence (1893)

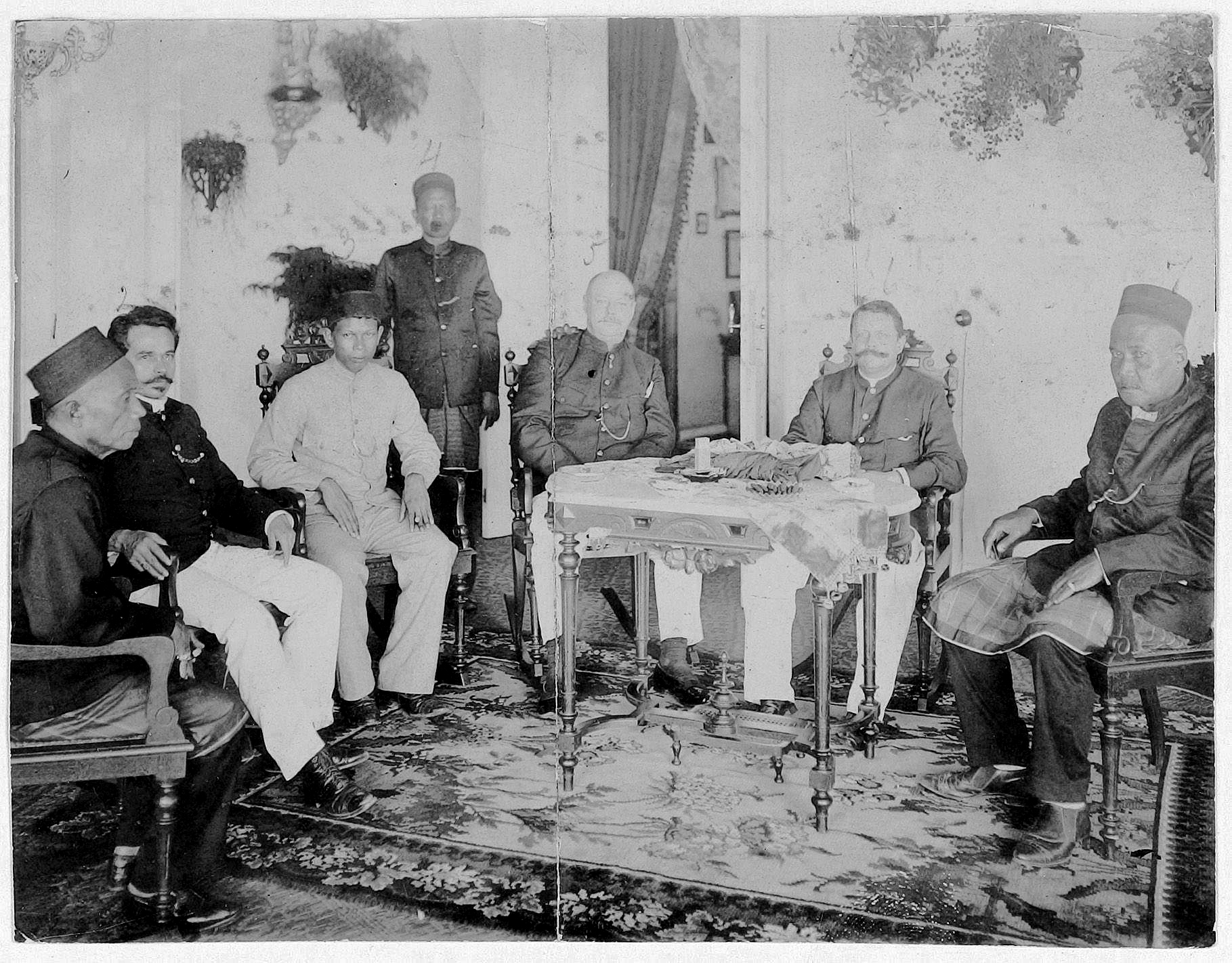
Surrender of the Crown Prince of the Sultanate of "MartaNingrat", Djambi (Jambi), in Sumatra before the Dutch residency official O.L. Helfrich, who takes the insignia in reception (March 26, 1904)

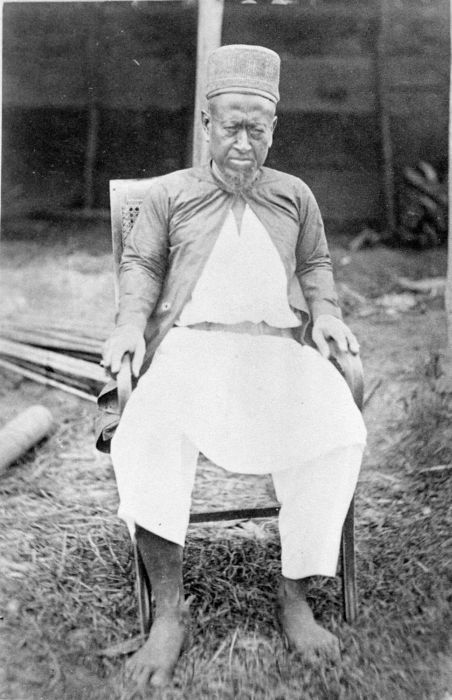
Photograph of the Sultan, Ahmad Nazaruddin (1858–81) taken during a Royal Netherlands Geographical Society expedition from 1877 to 1879, by Daniël David Veth.
