= Jambi Malay =

Language in Indonesia

- bahaso Jambi; baso Jambi
- بهاس جمبي
- Native to: Indonesia (Jambi)
- Region: Sumatra
- Ethnicity: Jambi Malay, Batin, etc.
- Native speakers: (1 million cited 2000 census)
- Language family: Austronesian: Malayo-Polynesian; (disputed); Malayic; Jambi Malay
- Dialects: Tanjung Jabung; Jambi City; Muaro Jambi; Batanghari; Tebo; Bungo; Sarolangun; Marangin
- Writing system: Latin (Indonesian alphabet); Jawi

Language codes
- ISO 639-3: jax
- Glottolog: jamb1236
- Areas where Jambi Malay is a majority Areas where Jambi Malay is a minority

Jambi Malay (bahaso Jambi or baso Jambi, Jawi: بهاس جمبي), is a Malayic language primarily spoken by the Jambi Malay people in Jambi, Indonesia, but also spoken by migrants who have settled in Jambi. Jambi Malay is considered as a dialect of the Malay language that is mainly spoken in Jambi, but it is also used in the southern part of Riau and the northern part of South Sumatra. In Jambi, Jambi Malay has eight dialects, including the Tanjung Jabung dialect, Jambi City dialect, Muaro Jambi dialect, Batanghari dialect, Tebo dialect, Bungo dialect, Sarolangun dialect, and Merangin dialect. Jambi Malay is used as a lingua franca and for interaction among the various ethnic groups in Jambi. The differences between each dialect in Jambi Malay range from about 51 to 80 percent.

Historically, the people of Jambi are part of the Malay world. This can be seen from archaeological and historical research findings, such as the discovery of charters and inscriptions like the Karang Berahi and Kedukan Bukit inscriptions, which use the structure of the Malay language, commonly referred to as Old Malay. The Karang Berahi and Kedukan Bukit inscriptions were found in the upper reaches of Jambi, located on the banks of the Marangin River, a tributary of the Batang Hari River. Between the 17th century and the 19th century, Jambi was part of the Malay Sultanate of Jambi, which also encompasses parts of Riau and South Sumatra. Due to influences from Javanese culture and cordial relations between the Jambi Sultanate and the Mataram Sultanate in the past, Jambi Malay has absorbed significant loanwords from Javanese.

== Classification ==
Jambi Malay is a dialect of Malay, which is a member of the Austronesian family of languages, which includes languages from Taiwan, Southeast Asia and the Pacific Ocean, with a smaller number in continental Asia. Malagasy, a geographic outlier spoken in Madagascar in the Indian Ocean, is also a member of this language family. Although these languages are not necessarily mutually intelligible to any extent, their similarities are often quite apparent. In more conservative languages like Malay, many roots have come with relatively little change from their common ancestor, Proto-Austronesian language. There are many cognates found in the languages' words for kinship, health, body parts and common animals. Numbers, especially, show remarkable similarities.

Jambi Malay is closely related to Palembang Malay spoken in neighboring South Sumatra, specifically in terms of phonology and vocabulary. It is also related to Riau Malay spoken in Riau and the surrounding islands, and Bengkulu Malay spoken in Bengkulu.

== Geographic distribution and usage ==
Speakers of Jambi Malay are distributed throughout Jambi as well as the southern part of Riau. Jambi Malay is the most widely spoken language in eastern Jambi and is also partially spoken in western Jambi, where Kerinci and Minangkabau dominate. Jambi Malay is the dominant language across most regencies and cities in Jambi, except for Kerinci Regency and the city of Sungai Penuh in western Jambi. Meanwhile, West and East Tanjung Jabung Regency currently lack a dominant language due to an influx of transmigrants from other parts of Indonesia who speak their regional languages, such as Javanese and Bugis. The Batin people, a subgroup of the Minangkabau people living in Jambi, speaks a dialect of Jambi Malay that is heavily influenced by Minangkabau.

In Jambi, Indonesian is the primary language used in formal situations and education, while Jambi Malay serves as the lingua franca in informal contexts. It facilitates communication among the diverse ethnic groups residing in Jambi, such as the Javanese, Banjarese and Bugis. Migrants in Jambi tend to code-switch between Jambi Malay, Indonesian and their native languages, especially in the market. In addition, Jambi Malay is also spoken by Jambi diaspora living in other parts of Indonesia. Malay is the everyday language of the Jambi people, passed down by their ancestors throughout their lives. The use of Malay as a daily spoken language also impacts various fields such as history, religion, business, education, customs, traditions, architecture, literature, writing, as well as art and culture. Based on historical evidence that has been found, such as inscriptions discovered in Jambi, Palembang, and Bangka, it can be concluded that the Malay language, which has long been used in Indonesia, especially in Sumatra, was prevalent in a major influential kingdom at that time. The development of Malay was closely linked with the growth and expansion of Srivijaya Empire. The rise of Malay kingdoms and sultanates such as the Jambi Sultanate also contributes to the spread of Malay in Jambi.

Currently, Jambi Malay course is being taught by the University of Jambi's Faculty of Teacher Training and Education as part of the Indonesian Language and Literature Education study program. The course description for the Jambi Malay course, as formulated by the program's curriculum development team, is: "Students will appreciate cultural diversity by mastering the characteristics of Jambi Malay and applying this knowledge in various Jambi Malay cultural and literary activities. On the other hand, there have been proposals to include Jambi Malay in the elementary school curriculum throughout Jambi as part of an effort to preserve the language.

== Dialects ==
There are eight different dialects of Jambi Malay, including the Tanjung Jabung dialect, Jambi City dialect, Muaro Jambi dialect, Batanghari dialect, Tebo dialect, Bungo dialect, Sarolangun dialect, and Merangin dialect. Each dialect has its own subdialects, which may also differ from one another. Nevertheless, all of these dialects are generally mutually intelligible.

The Jambi City dialect is regarded as the prestigious dialect of Jambi Malay due to Jambi City's historical and cultural significance as the seat of ancient Malay kingdoms and sultanates. Interestingly, Jambi City itself has two urban areas separated by the Batang Hari River, where each area has its own sub-distincts dialect: Jambi Kota dialect and Jambi Kota Seberang dialect. Jambi Kota and Jambi Kota Seberang are administratively part of the city of Jambi. However, they exhibit different variations of the Malay language. For example, 'close the door' in Jambi Kota Malay is tutup pintu, which is the same as in Indonesian, while in Jambi Kota Seberang Malay it is kancing lawang, which is the same as in Javanese. These examples differ lexically but share similar meanings and usage. Jambi Kota and Jambi Kota Seberang differ significantly because historically, Jambi Kota Seberang served as a center of concentration for native Malay inhabitants and some immigrants, while Jambi Kota served as the administrative center. Lexically, some vocabulary in the Jambi Kota Seberang dialect may not be understood by speakers of the Jambi Kota dialect.

The Jambi Malay dialects spoken outside the city of Jambi exhibit even greater variation compared to those spoken within the city limits. These dialects differ in lexicon, phonology, and grammar. For example, words that end with the vowel "a" in Indonesian normally become "o" in the Jambi Malay variety spoken in Jambi City, such as mata 'eye' → mato, lada 'pepper' → lado and apa 'what' → apo. However, in the Tanjung Jabung dialect, words ending with the vowel "a" change to "e", and in some cases, the letter "a" changes to "i", such as kemana 'go where' → kemine, siapa 'who' → siape and apa 'what' → ape. From a phonological perspective, the Jambi Malay dialect in East Tanjung Jabung Regency closely resembles to the Malay dialect spoken in Riau and the Malay Peninsula. Additionally, each variety may also show influences from other languages. For example, the Malay dialect spoken in Bungo and Tebo Regency is influenced by Minangkabau, owing to its proximity to West Sumatra and many Minangkabau migrants inhabiting the region. On the other hand, the Jambi City dialect, similar to Palembang Malay spoken in Palembang, has strong influence from Javanese, as Javanese was once the court language of the Jambi Sultanate.

Below are examples of lexical differences in Jambi Malay based on each dialects:

Standard Indonesian	Mudung Laut (Jambi City)	Dusun Teluk (Batanghari)	Lubuk Kepayang (Sarolangun)	Muara Siau (Merangin)	Suo Suo (Tebo)	Dusun Danau (Bungo)
tangan 'hand'	taŋan	taŋan	taŋan	taŋan	taŋan	taŋan
kiri 'left'	kiʁi	kiri	kiʁin	kidaw	kiʁi	kidaw
datang (Note: tiba is also acceptable in Indonesian, and closer to Jambi equivalents) 'arrive'	tibo	tibo	tibʊ	tibo	tibo	tibo
tahu 'know'	tau	səntuw	taum	tau	tau	tau, ŋ-aʁəti
darah 'blood'	daʁah	dara	daʁah	daʁah	daʁah	daʁah
tertawa 'laugh'	tɐtawo	tawo	gəlaʔ	gilaʔ	gəlaʔ	gəlaʔ
tidur 'sleep'	maʁiŋ	te̝dʊr	tidʊʁ	tiduː	tidʊʁ	tidua
anak 'child'	budaʔ	anaʔ	budaʔ	anaʔ	anaʔ	anaʔ

== Phonology ==
Like many other regional languages in Indonesia, there is no standardized phonological system for Jambi Malay. On the other hand, each dialect of Jambi Malay may exhibit unique phonological features. The table below illustrates the phonology of the Jambi City dialect, which is considered the prestigious dialect of Jambi Malay, based on the phonological system developed by Gani et al. (2000).

=== Vowels ===
Like Indonesian and other Malayic languages, Jambi Malay has five Vowels, which are /i/, /e/, /a/, /o/, and /u/. The position of each vowel can be seen in the following diagram:

	Front	Central	Back
High	i		u
Mid	e		o
Low		a	

=== Diphthongs ===
There are only five diphthongs in Jambi Malay, which are /ay/, /aw/, /oy/, /uo/ and /ie/. The table below demonstrates to whether the sequences are opening or closing (i.e., whether they are moving towards open/low vowels or closed/high vowels).

		Open syllable	Closed syllable
Opening	uo	uondi 'lottery' uontal 'throw'	
Closing	ay		damay 'peace' gulay 'gulai'
Closing	aw		kacaw 'chaos' lampaw 'exceed'
Closing	oy		oy 'hi' amboy 'wow'
Closing	ie	ienjak 'step' ientiep 'peek'	

=== Consonants ===
In Jambi Malay, there are nineteen consonant phonemes: /p/, /b/, /t/, /d/, /t͡ʃ/, /d͡ʒ/, /k/, /ɡ/, /ʔ/, /s/, /h/, /m/, /n/, /ŋ/, /ɲ/, /r/, /l/, /w/, and /j/.

		Bilabial	Alveolar	Palatal	Velar	Glottal
Nasal		m	n	ɲ	ŋ	
Plosive	voiceless	p	t	t͡ʃ	k	ʔ
Plosive	voiced	b	d	d͡ʒ	ɡ	
Fricative			s			h
Semivowel		w		j		
Lateral			l			
Trill					r	

Notes:

- /p/, /t/ and /h/ are unreleased and become [p̚], [t̚] and [h̚] and /k/ becomes a glottal stop [ʔ] in the syllable-final position.
- /k/ and /ɡ/ become palatal [c] and [ɟ] and /h/ become velar [x] when they appear before the phoneme /i/.
- In Indonesian orthography, /t͡ʃ/ and /d͡ʒ/ are written as ⟨c⟩ and ⟨j⟩ respectively, while /ŋ/ and /ɲ/ are written as ⟨ng⟩ and ⟨ny⟩ respectively.

=== Stress ===
Stress in Jambi Malay is divided into word stress and sentence stress. Word stress does not distinguish meaning and usually falls on the final syllable. For example:

- /rumah/ 'house'
- /ŋopi/ 'have a coffee'
- /terbaka/ 'burnt'
- /mend͡ʒauh/ 'to move away'
- /mebat͡ʃoka/ 'to read for someone'
- /meɲulamkan/ 'to embroider for someone'

Sentence stress generally falls on the final syllable of the last word in the sentence. For example:

- /maʔ tu tukaŋ t͡ʃut͡ʃi/ 'that woman is the washing machine repairman'
- /uraŋ nan kuat tu petani/ 'farmers are the strongest man'

== Grammar ==
Along with Indonesian, standard Malay, and other Malayic languages, the word order in Jambi Malay is typically subject-verb-object (SVO). While there are notable exceptions, the grammar structure of Jambi Malay shares many similarities with Indonesian and standard Malay.

=== Affixes ===
Jambi Malay has a number of affixes that can join with the base word to form an affixed word. There are three types of affixes in Jambi Malay are: prefixes, suffixes, and infixes. Similar to other Malayic languages, Jambi Malay words are composed of a root or a root plus derivational affixes. The root is the primary lexical unit of a word and is usually bisyllabic, of the shape CV(C)CV(C). Affixes are "glued" onto roots (which are either nouns or verbs) to alter or expand the primary meaning associated with a given root, effectively generating new words.

==== Prefixes ====
A prefix or initial affix is an affix added to the beginning of a word. Jambi Malay has nine prefixes, namely pa-, paN-, ma-, maN-, ba-, sa-, ta-, di-, and ka-, in which the standard Indonesian equivalents are pe-, peN-, me-, meN-, ber-, sa-, ta-, di-, and ka- respectively. In Jambi Malay, the prefix pa- functions as a noun-forming affix. In morphological processes, the prefix pa- can signify an actor, habit, or instrument. For example:

- pa- + lari 'run' → palari 'runner'
- pa- + rokok 'cigarettes' → parokok 'smoker'
- pa- + renang 'swim' → parenang 'swimmer'
- pa- + rampok 'rob' → parampok 'robber'
- pa- + rusak 'broken' → parusak 'saboteur'

In Jambi Malay, the prefix paN- has various forms, namely pam-, pan-, pang-, and pany-. In morphological processes, this prefix functions can signify an actor, habit, or instrument. For example:

- paN- + bohong 'lie' → pambohong 'lier'
- paN- + sakiet 'sick' → panyakiet 'sickness'
- paN- + ganti 'replace' → pangganti 'replacer'
- paN- + uruos 'handle' → panguruos 'handler'
- paN- + kasi 'give' → pangasi 'giver'

The prefix ma- in the morphological processes of Jambi Malay functions as a verb-forming affix and signifies 'to do' or 'to perform'. For example:

- ma- + lapor 'report' → malapor 'to report'
- ma- + luruous 'straight' → maluruous 'to straighten'
- ma- + lempar 'throw' → malempar 'to throw'
- ma- + rambat 'spread' → marambat 'to spread'
- ma- + rebuot 'snatch' → marabuot 'to snatch'

The prefix maN- in Jambi Malay has various forms, namely mam-, man-, mang- and many-. In the morphological process, this prefix functions as a verb-forming element and has the meaning 'to do'. For example:

- maN- + paku 'nail' → mampaku 'to nail'
- maN- + dapat 'get' → mandapat 'to get'
- maN- + jual 'sell' → manjual 'to sell'
- maN- + keras 'hard' → mangeras 'harden'
- maN- + tulies 'write' → manulies 'to write'

The prefix ba- in the morphological process of Jambi Malay functions as a verbal prefix and carries the meaning 'to do or to have. The prefix ba- has one variant form, namely bal-. For example:

- ba- + gawe 'work' → bagawe 'to have work'
- ba- + duiet 'money' → baduiet 'to have money'
- ba- + ajar 'teach' → balajar 'to study'
- ba- + kurang 'less' → bakurang 'to decrease'
- ba- + laki 'man' → balaki 'to have husband'

The prefix sa- in the morphological process of Jambi Malay functions as a noun-forming element and means 'one, whole, or same. For example:

- sa- + karuong 'sack' → sakaruong 'a sack'
- sa- + ruma 'house' → saruma 'whole house'
- sa- + lamo 'long (time)' → salamo 'as long as'
- sa- + lebat 'dense' → salebat 'as dense as'
- sa- + pirieng 'plate' → sapirieng 'whole plate'

The prefix ta- in the morphological process of Jambi Malay functions as a verb-forming element and means 'unintentionally or able to. For example:

- ta- + tukar 'swap' → tatukar 'got swapped'
- ta- + bakar 'burn' → tabakar 'got burnt'
- ta- + bawak 'bring' → tabawak 'got brought'
- ta- + tekan 'pressure' → tatekan 'got pressured'
- ta- + lampau 'pass' → talampau 'got passed'

The prefix di- in the morphological process of Jambi Malay functions as a verb-forming element and means 'to perform an action'. For example:

- di- + mbek 'take' → dimbek 'taken'
- di- + gambar 'draw' → digambar 'drawn'
- di- + pake 'use' → dipake 'used'
- di- + tuja 'stab' → dituja 'stabbed'
- di- + uba 'change' → diuba 'changed'

The prefix ka- in the morphological process of Jambi Malay functions as a verb-forming element. This prefix has very limited distribution. For example:

- ka- + tawo 'laughter' → katawo 'to laugh'
- ka- + luar 'outside' → kaluar 'to go outside'
- ka- + dalam 'inside' → kadalam 'to go inside'

==== Suffixes ====
In Jambi Malay, there are three different suffixes: -kan, -i, and -an, which are very similar to standard Indonesian. The suffix -kan in the morphological process of Jambi Malay means 'commanding or emphasizing'. For example:

- bukak 'open' + -kan → bukakkan 'open it'
- kosong 'empty' + -kan → kosongkan 'empty it'
- kiriem 'send' + -kan → kiriemkan 'send it'
- bayar 'pay' + -kan → bayarkan 'pay it'
- kelek 'carry' + -kan → kelekkan 'carry it'

The suffix -i in the morphological process of Jambi Malay also carries the meaning of 'commanding or emphasizing'. For example:

- mbek 'take' + -i → mbeki 'take it'
- duduok 'sit' + -i → duduoki 'sit on it'
- singiet 'hide' + -i → singieti 'hide it'
- tamba 'add' + -i → tambai 'add it'
- raso 'taste' + -i → rasoi 'taste it'

The suffix -an in the morphological process of Jambi Malay functions as a nominalizer and means 'place, tool, or result. For example:

- lamar 'propose' + -an → lamaran 'proposal'
- masak 'cook' + -an → masakan 'cooking'
- kasi 'give' + -an → kasian 'pity'
- sangkuot 'involve' + -an → sangkuotan 'involvement'
- makan 'eat' + -an → makakan 'food'

==== Infixes ====
In Jambi Malay, there are three forms of infixes: -al-, -aR-, and -am-. The infix -al- functions as a nominalizer and means 'tool'. For example:

- t + -al- + apak → talapak 'palm'
- t + -al- + uonjuok → taluonjuok 'index finger'
- g + -al- + uguor → galuguor 'garcinia atroviridis'
- p + -al- + atuok → palatuok 'trigger'

The infix -aR- means 'resembling' or 'like' and functions as a form for creating nouns and adjectives. For example:

- g + -aR- + igi → garigi 'serration'
- s + -aR- + abuot → sarabuot 'fiber'
- b + -aR- + isiek → barisiek 'noisy'

The infix -am- functions as a form for creating adjectives and means 'having' or 'like'. For example:

- g + am- + uru → gamuru 'thunder'
- g + am- + ilang → gamilang 'brilliant'
- k + am- + ilau → kamilau 'shiny'
- g + am- + etar → gametar 'shiver'

=== Reduplication ===
Reduplication is the process of forming words through repetition. In Jambi Malay, reduplication can take the forms of full reduplication, partial reduplication, and sound change reduplication. Full reduplication in Jambi Malay can involve nouns, verbs, adjectives, pronouns, numerals, and adverbs. Fully reduplicated words formed from nouns in the morphological process of Jambi Malay signify plural markers. For example:

- cangkier-cangkier 'many mugs'
- guru-guru 'many teachers'
- kertas-kertas 'many papers'

Fully reduplicated words from verbs have the meaning of being aimless or random. For example:

- tiduok-tiduok 'lying down aimlessly without falling asleep'
- nyanyi-nyanyi 'singing aimlessly'
- minuom-minuom 'drinking aimlessly'

Fully reduplicated words formed from adjectives in the morphological process of Jambi Malay have the meaning of frequent or indicate plurality. For example:

- bersi-bersi 'many are cleaning'
- cantieh-cantiek 'many are pretty'
- besak-besak 'many are large'

Fully reduplicated words formed from pronouns in the morphological process of Jambi Malay indicate plurality or frequency. For example:

- diok-diok 'many of them'
- kami-kami 'everyone of us'
- kito-kito 'everyone of us'

Fully reduplicated words formed from numerals in the morphological process of Jambi Malay have the meanings of 'each' or indicate 'details'. For example:

- sikok-sikok 'one by one'
- galo-galo 'everyone' or 'everything'
- dikiet-dikiet 'little by little'

Fully reduplicated words formed from adverbs in the morphological process of Jambi Malay indicate quality markers. For example:

- dulu-dulu 'earlier'
- sekarang-sekarang 'right now'
- kemaren-kemaren 'the day before yesterday'

Partial reduplication usually involves words with affixation. Partial reduplication in the morphological process of Jambi Malay can occur with nouns, verbs, adjectives, numerals, and adverbs. Partial reduplication formed from nouns in the morphological process of Jambi Malay signifies plural markers. For example:

- babiji-biji 'having many seeds'
- babatu-batu 'rocky'
- baduri-duri 'thorny'

Partial reduplication formed from verbs in the morphological process of Jambi Malay signifies plural markers or lack of direction. For example:

- mandorong-dorong 'pushing aimlessly'
- mambagi-bagi 'sharing many things'
- mangacau-ngacau 'messing up repeatedly'

Partial reduplication formed from adjectives in the morphological process of Jambi Malay signifies plural markers, quality markers, contrived characteristics, or intentionality. For example:

- tadesak-desak 'in dire needs'
- batenang-tenang 'purposely calmed down'
- tapucat-pucat 'extremely pale'

Partial reduplication formed from numerals in the morphological process of Jambi Malay is not commonly found. This type of reduplication signifies plural markers or qualities. For example

- semuo-muo 'together'
- bakali-kali 'frequent'

Partial reduplication originating from adverbs in the morphological process of Jambi Malay is also not commonly found. This type of reduplication signifies specific times, limits, or conditions. For example:

- saari-ari 'every time'
- sawaktu-waktu 'anytime'
- salambat-lambat 'latest'

Sound change reduplication in the morphological process of Jambi Malay occurs in nouns, verbs, and adjectives. Sound change reduplication originating from nouns in the morphological process of Jambi Malay has the meaning of 'various' or 'diverse'. For example:

- lauok-pauok 'assortments of side dishes'
- warno-warni 'assortments of colors'
- sayuor-mayuor 'assortments of vegetables'

Sound change reduplication originating from verbs in the morphological process of Jambi Malay signifies quality markers, plural markers, or unpredictability. For example:

- brengat-brenguot 'very angry'
- mondar-mandir 'waking aimlessly'
- gerak-geriek 'gestures'

Sound change reduplication originating from adjectives in the morphological process of Jambi Malay signifies quality markers or lack of direction. For example:

- kocar-kacir 'very disorganized'
- iruok-pikuok 'very tumultuous'
- kacau-balau 'very chaotic'

=== Nouns ===
Nouns are a class of words that can typically function as the subject or object of a clause. This class of words is often associated with people, things, or entities that are treated as objects. Examples of nouns in Jambi Malay are jalo 'net', manggo 'mango', keries 'kris', sarap 'trash', and pasier 'sand'. Examples of the usage of these words in sentences is as follows:

- Apo yang dibawake? Jalo. 'What is he bringing? Net.'
- Apo yang dimakan adek? Manggo. 'What is younger brother eating? Mango'
- Apo yang dipegang aya? Keries. 'What is dad holding? Kris.'
- Apo yang dibuang Muna? Sarap. 'What did Munah throw away? Trash'
- Apo itu? Pasier. 'What is that? Sand.'

A noun phrase is a phrase that has the same distribution as a noun word class. Noun phrases in Jambi Malay can be seen in the following examples. Noun phrases in Jambi Malay categorically have several processes, such as noun followed by other nouns, noun followed by verbs, noun followed by numerals and noun followed by adverbs. Examples of noun followed by other nouns are:

- laman ruma 'backyard'
- dagieng kerbo 'buffalo meat'
- nasi jaguong 'corn rice'
- cantieng beras tu 'that can of rice'
- anak tukang kebuon tu 'the gardener's child'

Examples of noun followed by verbs are:

- orang mabuok 'drunk guy'
- aek ngalier 'flowing water'
- api yang menyalo 'burning fire'
- guru ngaji 'preaching teacher'
- budak degiel tu 'that naughty kid'

Examples of noun followed by numerals are:

- kelapo tiga ikok 'three coconuts'
- kertas salembar 'a sheet of paper'
- orang banyak 'many people'
- bua galo 'all fruits'
- kue saparo 'half a cake'

Examples of noun followed by adverbs are:

- batino sore kemaren 'the girl from yesterday'
- budak yang dulu 'the kid from before'
- karcies tadi 'the ticket from just now'
- duiet uontuok besok 'the money for tomorrow'
- pakean sekarang 'the clothes for now'

=== Verbs ===
Verbs are a class of words that typically function as predicates. Semantically, this class of words describes an action. Examples of verbs in Jambi Malay are cari 'search', gantuong 'hang', tiduok 'sleep', mbek 'take', and bagi 'give'. The usage of these words in sentences is as follows.

- Apo yang dio cari? 'What is he lookin for?'
- Gantuong orang itu! 'Hang that man!'
- Jo siapo dio tiduok? 'Who is she sleeping with?'
- Mbek buku dio tu! 'Take that book of his!'
- Bagi aku maka! 'Give me food!'

A verbal phrase is a phrase that has the same distribution as a verb word class. Verbal phrases in Jambi Malay can be seen in the following examples:

- nak pegi 'want to go'
- suda balek 'already returned'
- sedang bagawe 'is working'
- ndak makan 'want to eat'
- dak dibayar 'not paid'

=== Adjectives ===
Adjectives are words that describe nouns. Examples of adjectives in Jambi Malay are besak 'big', baiek 'good', elok 'nice', cantiek 'pretty', and baru 'new'. The usage of these words in sentences is as follows:

- Cammano ukuorane? Besak. 'How big is the size? big'
- Cammano keadaan budak tu? Baiek. 'How is the kid's condition? Good.'
- Cammano bentuok barange? Elok. 'How is the shape of the thing? Nice.'
- Cammano Rupo gadies itu? Cantiek. 'How does the girl looks like? Pretty.'
- Kapan kau beli? Baru. 'When did you buy? It's new.'

=== Numerals ===
Numerals are words that indicate numbers or quantities. Examples of numerals in Jambi Malay are sekok 'one', duo 'two', galo 'all', banyak 'many', and dikiet 'a few'. The usage of these words in sentences includes the following:

- Berapo anake? Sekok. 'How many kids? One.'
- Berapo ikok mubiele? Duo. 'How many cars? Two.'
- Siapo bae yang datang? Galo. 'Who's coming? All of them.'
- Berapo isie? Banyak. 'How much does it contain? Many.'
- Berapo lagi yang tinggal? Dikiet. 'How much left? A few.'

Number phrases are phrases that have the same distribution as numerals. Numeral phrases in Jambi Malay can be seen in the following examples:

- duo ekok sapi 'two cows'
- tigo lembar kertas 'three sheets of paper'
- tuju kotak kapuor 'seven boxes of chalk'
- limo karuong beras 'five sacks of rice'
- sekok telok 'one egg'

=== Adverbs ===
Adverbs are words that describe an action or a state. Examples of adverbs in Jambi Malay include sore 'afternoon', kemaren 'yesterday', perna 'ever', kagek 'later', and sekarang 'now'. The usage of these words in sentences is as follows:

- Kapan dijempuote? Sore. 'When are you picking him up? Afternoon.'
- Kapan diok datang? Kemaren. 'When did he arrived? Yesterday.'
- Perna nengok bendoe? Perna. 'Have you ever saw the object? Ever.'
- Pegilah ka sano! Kagek. 'Go there! Later.'
- Kapan nguompuole? Sekarang. 'When are we meeting up? Now.'

Adverbial phrases are phrases that have the same distribution as adverbs. Adverbial phrases in Jambi Malay can be seen in the following examples:

- sekarang ko 'right now'
- sore kemaren 'yesterday afternoon'
- besok pagi 'tomorrow morning'
- kagek siang 'this noon'
- suda malem 'it's late'

=== Pronouns ===
Pronouns are words that replace nouns or noun phrases. In Jambi Malay, these words consist of personal pronouns, interrogative pronouns and demonstrative Pronouns. Personal pronouns are words that indicate persons, such as sayo 'I (formal)', aku 'I (informal)', kami 'we (exclusive)', kito 'we (inclusive)', kamu 'you (semiformal)', awak 'you (informal)', kau 'you (informal)', and dio 'he/she'. Usage of the pronouns can be seen in the following example:

- Sayo idak nak balek. 'I am not going home.'
- Aku mara nian samo adek. 'I am very angry with my younger sibling.'
- Dio yang mukuol aku. 'He's the one who punched me.'
- Kami dak tik yang datang ka sano. 'None of us are coming there.'
- Kito galo yang moronge. 'All of us are the one who bought it.'
- Kamu jangan tarpengaru kawan! 'Don't you get influenced by your friends!'
- Uruosla barang kau tu! 'Take care of your things!'
- Dio dak tiek gawe sekarang. 'He's not working currently.'

Interrogative pronouns are words that function as substitutes for the persons being asked about. In Jambi Malay, these words include apo 'what' and sapo 'who'. Usage of the pronouns can be seen in the following example:

- Apo yang ditutuop tu? 'What is being covered there?'
- Makan apo? 'Eat what?'
- Sapo yang nulies ko? 'Who wrote this?'
- Baju ko punyo sapo? 'Whose clothes are these?'

Demonstrative pronouns are words that function to indicate something. In Jambi Malay, these words include iko 'this' and itu 'that'. Usage of the pronouns can be seen in the following example:

- lko bendoe. 'This is the thing.'
- Pake ko! 'Use this!'
- Itu gambar kau. 'That's your drawing.'
- Elok nian tu. 'That's really good.'

== Vocabulary ==
Due to historical contacts with Javanese people and culture, as well as the increasing influx of migrants from Java, Jambi Malay has been influenced by Javanese, especially the dialect spoken in Jambi City and the surrounding area. Words that have been absorbed from Javanese include gawe 'to work', kembang 'flower', buntut 'tail', and kuping 'ear'. The influence of Javanese on Jambi Malay diminishes westward along the Batanghari River. Jambi Malay has also been influenced by Minangkabau, particularly the dialect spoken in western Jambi, specifically in Bungo and Tebo Regency, due to the proximity to West Sumatra and the migration of Minangkabau people from West Sumatra. Minangkabau is considered the lingua franca in western Jambi, which is why it influences the Jambi Malay spoken in that region. Additionally, there are also some influences from the Kerinci language in the dialects spoken in Merangin and Sarolangun Regency. Jambi Malay is very similar to Kerinci and Minangkabau, though they are generally not mutually intelligible. It is estimated that up to 80% of Kerinci vocabularies has similarity with Jambi Malay, while it is estimated that 77% of Jambi Malay vocabularies has similarity with Minangkabau.

Like other regional languages in Indonesia, Jambi Malay has also received significant influences from standard Indonesian, which continues to increase, due to its status as the national language and lingua franca in official environments. Lastly, similar to Indonesian and other regional languages, there is also some limited lexical influence from Dutch, such as the words lap 'wipe', pol 'full' (from Dutch vol), and reken 'count'.

Below are examples of commonly used Jambi Malay vocabulary along with their Indonesian and English translations:

=== Numerals ===
Number	Jambi Malay	Indonesian	English
1	sekok	satu	one
2	duo	dua	two
3	tigo	tiga	three
4	empat	empat	four
5	limo	lima	five
6	enam	enam	six
7	tuju, tujuh	tujuh	seven
8	lapan	delapan	eight
9	semilan	sembilan	nine
10	sepuluh	sepuluh	ten
11	sebelas	sebelas	eleven
20	duo puluh	dua puluh	twenty
50	limo puluh	lima puluh	fifty
100	seghatus	seratus	one hundred
500	limo ghatus	lima ratus	five hundred
1000	seghibu	seribu	one thousand
5000	limo ghibu	lima ribu	five thousand
100,000	seghatus ghibu	seratus ribu	one hundred thousand
1,000,000	sejuto, sekok juto	sejuta, satu juta	one million

=== Directions ===
Jambi Malay	Indonesian	English
iko, ko	ini	this
itu, tu	itu	that
siko	sini	here
situ, sano	situ, sana	there
disiko	disini	over here
disitu, disano	disitu, disana	over there
kighi	kiri	left
kanan	kanan	right
atas	atas	up
bawah	bawah	down
utagho	utara	north
selatan	selatan	south
timugh	timur	east
barat	barat	west

=== Personal Pronouns ===
Jambi Malay	Indonesian	English
aku, sayo	aku, saya	I, me
anda	anda	you (formal)
kamu, kau	kamu	you (informal)
dio	dia	he/she
kami	kami	we (exclusive)
kito, kita	kita	we (inclusive)
megheka	mereka	they/them

=== Interrogatives Pronouns ===
Jambi Malay	Indonesian	English
siapo	siapa	who
apo	apa	what
ngapo	kenapa, mengapa	why
mano, dimano	mana, dimana	where
kapan	kapan	when
macam mano	gimana, bagaimana	how
beghapo	berapa	how much
kalu	bila, apabila, kalau	if

=== Nouns ===
Jambi Malay	Indonesian	English
aek	air	water
batang	pohon	tree
sunge	sungai	river
utan	hutan	forest
pante	pantai	beach
lanang, jantan	pria, laki-laki	man
betino	wanita, perempuan	woman
tana	tanah	land, ground, soil
jalan	jalan	road
kudo	kuda	horse
budak, anak	anak	child, kid
negagha	negara	country
sughat	surat	letter

=== Verbs ===
Jambi Malay	Indonesian	English
makan	makan	eat
minum	minum	drink
tidugh	tidur	sleep
laghi	lari	run
masu, cuci	basuh, cuci	wash
gawe	kerja	to work
tegak	berdiri	to stand
gambagh	gambar	to draw (a picture)
teghbang	terbang	to fly
tengok	lihat, tengok	see
bayagh	bayar	pay
bausaho	berusaha	to try (an attempt)
ambik	ambil	take

=== Adjectives ===
Jambi Malay	Indonesian	English
tinggi	tinggi	tall
cantiek	cantik	pretty
elok, baiek	bagus, baik	good
lebagh	lebar	wide
lentugh	lemas, lentur	weak, frail
besagh, besak	besar, gede	big, large
litak	cape, letih	tired
teghang	terang	bright
sio-sio	sia-sia	vain
cipit	sipit	slit-eyed
lamo	lama	long (time)
kecik	kecil	small
aluos	alus	soft
sakiet, sakit	sakit	sick
bersi	bersih	clean
dikiet	dikit	little

== Writing system ==
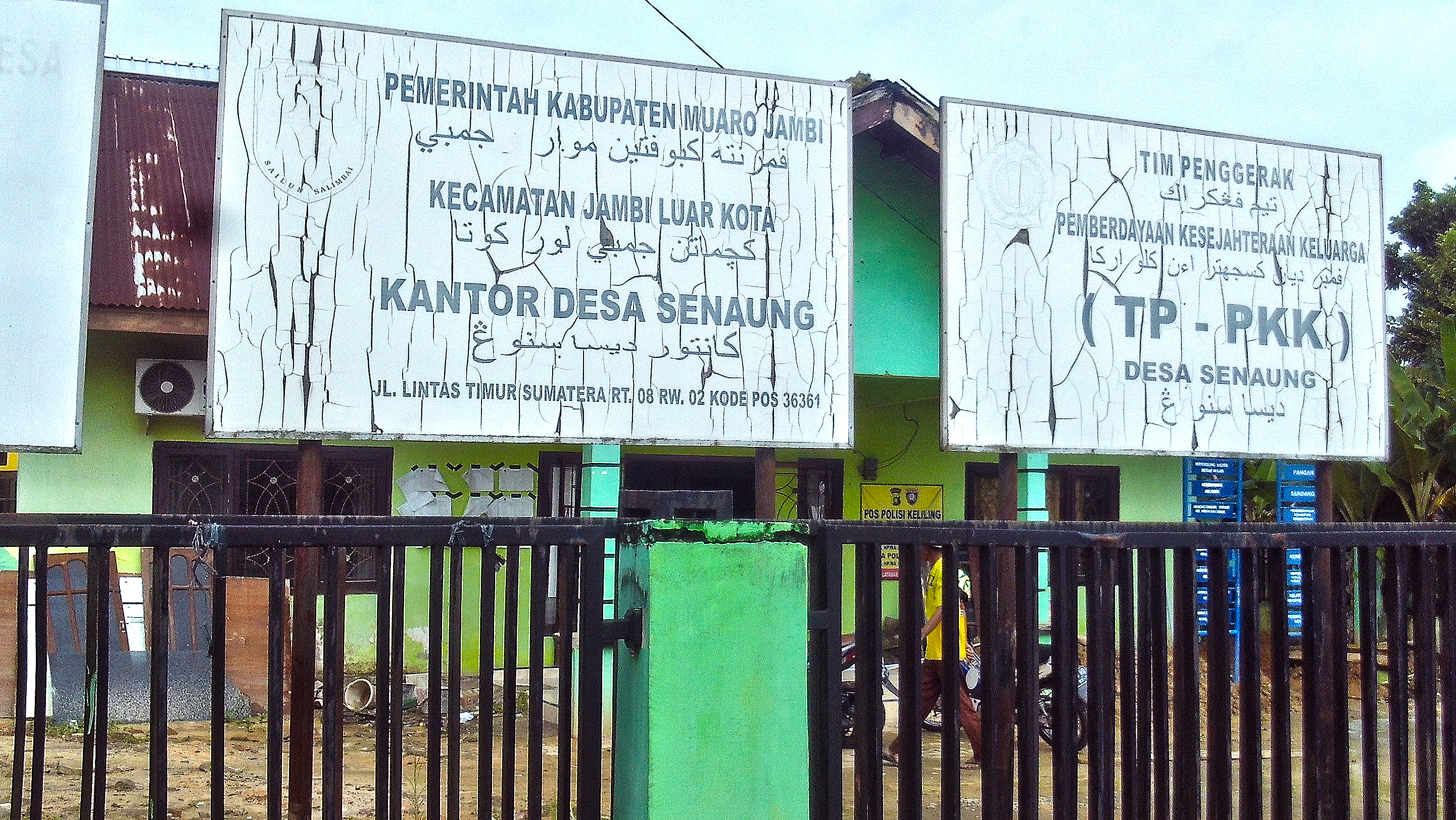
Government signs in Jambi are now written in both Jawi and Latin scripts

Like many other Malay varieties, Jambi Malay is written in both Latin and Jawi script (locally known as Arab-Melayu). There are slight differences between the Jawi alphabet used in Jambi Malay and the one used in standard Malay. For instance, the letter "fa" is represented by the character ف in standard Malay, whereas in Jambi Malay, the character ڤ is used instead.

Historically, Jawi was the commonly used script in the Malay world before the introduction of the Latin script through European colonization. The Jawi script spread with the onset of Islamization in Southeast Asia between the 13th to 14th century. It was used in royal correspondences, decrees, as well as literature such as poems and folklore by Malay kingdoms, becoming a traditional symbol of Malay culture and civilization. In Jambi, Jawi held a significant place in administrative and literary functions, reflecting the deep-rooted Islamic and Malay cultural heritage. However, the use of Jawi in Jambi has declined significantly due to the introduction of the Latin script by the Dutch during the colonial period. This shift was further reinforced by the adoption of Indonesian as the official language after Indonesia's independence, which uses the Latin alphabet. Today, the use of Jawi in Jambi is predominantly limited to older generations and cultural or ceremonial contexts. It is often seen in traditional arts, cultural events, and religious contexts, serving as a reminder of the region's rich historical and cultural legacy.

There have been efforts initiated by the Jambi provincial government to preserve the usage of the Jawi script. For instance, all government institutions signs in Jambi are now written in both Latin and Jawi script. In addition, the University of Jambi frequently conducts workshops to promote the Jawi script, alongside offering courses in Jambi Malay where students learn how to read and write using the Jawi script. In certain Islamic schools in Jambi, the Jawi script is still used for religious Islamic writing and poetry, especially for writing Qur'anic commentaries.

== Literature ==
Along with other Malay dialects, Jambi Malay has rich literatures that has been preserved for generations, locally known as Seloko. Seloko is a form of oral tradition that has been passed down through generations. Seloko is often presented during traditional ceremonies, such as wedding ceremonies. Seloko contains a set of norms that regulate the daily lives of its community members, with rules that, if violated, can lead to sanctions. Besides containing norms with corresponding sanctions for violations, Seloko also includes advice and messages intended to guide community members towards safety in their social interactions and daily lives. These norms and pieces of advice are conveyed through expressions in the form of proverbs, pantuns (traditional Malay poetry), or aphorisms. Jambi's traditional Seloko is not merely about proverbs, aphorisms, or pantuns, but goes deeper to represent a philosophy of life that forms the foundation of Jambi's cultural identity. A person who recites Seloko is called a Penyeloko. A Penyeloko typically uses steady rhyme and meter in delivering their Seloko, making it engaging and keeping the listeners interested. Seloko is often delivered using sentences that employ figures of speech like similes and metaphors, which means not everyone can fully grasp its meaning. Seloko is also commonly used by religious figures in Jambi to promote religious values to the local community. Below are some excerpts of pantuns that originated from Jambi:

Jambi Malay
Ambil lelapo di lubuk ruso

Buatlah atap dari pandan.

Supayo mantap menyambut puaso

Mari kito saling memaafkan.

Indonesian
Ambil kelapa di lubuk rusa

Buatlah atap dari pandan.

Supaya mantap menyambut puasa

Mari kita saling memaafkan.

English
Pick the coconut inside the deer

Make a roof from pandan leaves.

To ensure readiness for fasting

Let us forgive one another

The pantun above explains the value of religious character education. This information aims to ensure steadfastness and focus in carrying out fasting during the month of Ramadan and to avoid disturbances in the mind. It is advisable to forgive each other before the fasting month begins to erase sins committed in the past, whether intentional or unintentional.

Jambi Malay
Apo tando parang berkarat

Matonyo pepat kurang betaji.

Apo tando orang beradat

Bekerjo giat senang mengaji.

Indonesian
Apa tanda parang berkarat

Matanya pepat kurang betaji.

Apa tanda orang beradat

Bekerja giat senang mengaji.

English
What are the signs of a rusty machete

His eyes are flat and less pointed.

What are the signs of civilized people

Work hard and enjoy reading the Koran

The pantun above also explains the value of religious character education. The quote signifies the customs of the people of Jambi, who work diligently and never give up despite their circumstances. Additionally, these people always remember God to avoid calamities that may befall them. Ways of remembering God include performing the five daily prayers, engaging in dhikr (remembrance of God), and placing trust in God's will (tawakkal).

== Bibliography ==
- Gani, Erizal; Nura, Amris; Nazurti (2000). Tata Bahasa Melayu Jambi [Language Structure of Jambi Malay] (PDF) (in Indonesian). Jakarta: Agency for Language Development and Cultivation.
- Husin, Nurzuir; Zailoet; Semi, M. Atar; Karim, Isma Nasrul; Radjah, Desmawati; Djurip (1985). Struktur Bahasa Melayu Jambi [Structure of the Jambi Malay language] (PDF) (in Indonesian). Jakarta: Agency for Language Development and Cultivation.
- Dahlan, Saidat; Syair, Anwar; Manan, Abdullah; Jakub, llyas; Sabrin, Arnrin; Razak, Abdul; Mujiono; Yulisrnan (1985). Pemetaan Bahasa Daerah Riau dan Jambi [Mapping of the Regional Languages in Riau and Jambi] (PDF) (in Indonesian). Jakarta: Agency for Language Development and Cultivation.
- Yulisma; Supadi, Hartini; Haidas; Ridha, Ahmad; Masnidar (1997). Kamus Bahasa Indonesia – Jambi [Indonesian – Jambi Dictionary] (PDF) (in Indonesian). Jakarta: Agency for Language Development and Cultivation. ISBN 979-459-790-2.
- Rahima, Ade; Zahar, Erlina; Tara, Firman; Sujoko (2023). Morfosintaksis Numeralia Bahasa Melayu Jambi [Morphosyntax of Numerals in the Jambi Malay Language] (PDF) (in Indonesian) (1st ed.). Jambi: Eureka Media Aksara. ISBN 978-623-151-071-6.
- Yanti; Tadmor, Uri; Cole, Peter; Hermon, Gabriella. 2015. Critò Kitò: A collection of Jambi stories in the Seberang Dialect. Jakarta: Masyarakat Linguistik Indonesia [Indonesian Linguistic Society]. ISBN 978-602-17161-3-7 [Includes word list.]
- Żaneta Krulikowska, Nadra Nadra, & Muhammad Yusdi. (2020). Phonological Sketch of Malay Jambi Language of Sarolangun, Indonesia. Arbitrer, 7(2), 173–181. https://doi.org/10.25077/ar.7.2.173-181.2020
