= List of sultans of Jambi =

Sultan of Jambi
- Sultan Jambi

Incumbent
- Sayyid Fuad since 2021

Details
- Style: His Majesty
- First monarch: Sultan Abdul Kahar
- Formed: 1460; 566 years ago
- Abolished: 1904
- Residence: Jambi City

This is a list of sultans and kings of the former Jambi Sultanate. The Royal House of Jambi is a royal house of the region of Jambi in the Indonesia, Sumatra. Historically the head of the Jambi Sultanate, the position of sultan today carries with it no political powers or privileges and is mostly a traditional figure.

== Pre-sultanate kings ==
The Jambi Kingdom was first established in 1460 and ended in 1615.

No.	Portrait	Name	Reign start	Reign end	Notes
1		Datuk Paduko Berhalo with Putri Selaras Pinang Masak	1460	1480	Also known as Ahmad Salim or Ahmad Barus II
2		Orang Kaya Pingai	1480	1490	Also known as Sayyid Ibrahim
3		Orang Kaya Kedataran	1490	1500	Also known as Sayyid Abdul Rahman
4		Orang Kaya Hitam	1500	1515	Also known as Sayyid Ahmad Kamil
5		Panembahan Rantau Kapas	1515	1540	
6		Panembahan Rengas Pandak	1540	1565	
7		Panembahan Bawah Sawo	1565	1590	
8		Panembahan Kota Baru	1590	1615	

== Sultans ==
=== List of sultans from 1615 to present day ===
No.	Portrait	Name	Reign start	Reign end	Notes
9		Sultan Abdul Kahar	1615	1643	Also known as Pangeran Kedah
10		Sultan Agung Abdul Jalil	1643	1665	Also known as Pangeran Depati Anom and Sultan Abdul Djafri
11		Sultan Seri Ingologo	1665	1690	Also known as Raden Penulis and Sultan Anom Ingalaga
12		Sultan Ki Geboh Walando	1690	1696	Also known as Raden Tjakra Negara and Pangeran Depati
13		Sultan Muhammad Syah	1696	1740	
14		Sultan Istra Ingologo	1740	1770	
15		Sultan Anom Seri Ingologo	1770	1790	
16		Sultan Ratu Seri Ingologo	1790	1812	Also known as Mas’ud Badaruddin
17		Sultan Agung Seri Ingologo	1812	1833	
18		Sultan Muhammad Fakhruddin	1833	1841	
19		Sultan Abdul Rahman Nazaruddin	1841	1855	
20		Sultan Thaha Syaifuddin	1855	1858	First reign.
21		Sultan Ratu Ahmad Nazaruddin	1858	1881	
22		Sultan Muhilluddin	1881	1885	
23		Sultan Ahmad Zainul Abidin	1885	1899	
24		Sultan Thaha Syaifuddin	1900	1904	Second reign.
25		Sultan Abdurrachman Thaha Syaifuddin	2012	2021	
26		Sayyid Fuad	2021	present	
