= Ahmad Nazaruddin =

21st Sultan of Jambi

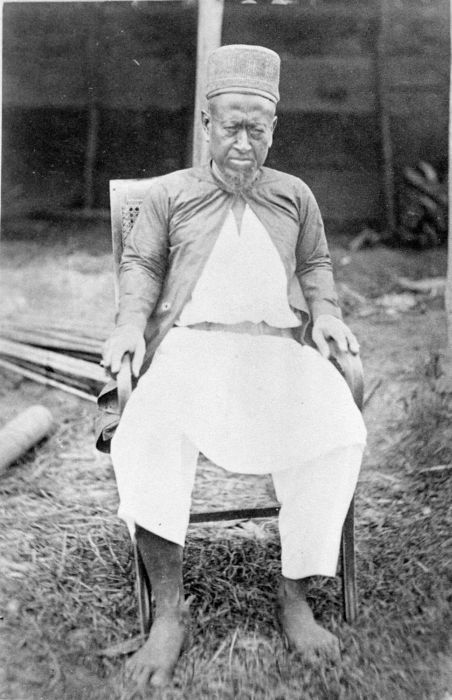
- Photograph of Sultan Ahmad Nazaruddin c. 1877–1879, by Daniël David Veth

21st Sultan of Jambi
- Reign: 1858–1881
- Appointment: 2 November 1858
- Predecessor: Thaha Syaifuddin
- Successor: Muhilluddin
- Born: Panembahan Prabu
- Died: 1881
- Father: Sultan Mohammad Facharuddin
- Religion: Sunni Islam

Ahmad Nazaruddin (Jawi: احمد نظرالدين, died 1881) also known as Panembahan Prabu, was the 21st Sultan of Jambi (contemporary Indonesia) and ruled 1858 to 1881. He was the uncle of Sultan Thaha Syaifuddin. Under Sultan Thaha's rule, he served as the Pangeran Ratu (ڤڠيرن راتو, meaning chief executive) of Jambi.

== Reign (1858-1881) ==
=== Appointment ===
On 2 November 1858, Panembahan Prabu was named Sultan Ahmad Nazarudin, following the destruction of the royal palace. As requested by the Dutch East Indies, he made and signed a new agreement on the day of the Sultan's appointment. As requested by the Dutch, he made and signed a new agreement on the day of his appointment. The Dutch governor of Batavia's charter, which includes the terms of the agreement, strengthens this new letter of agreement.

Numerous Dutch publications state that the Sultan of Jambi was living in "poor" circumstances. They make the barest minimum of living expenses via tributes in their individual holding territories. All they have is a stilt house for a palace. The size was somewhat bigger than that of a typical folk home. Central Hamlet, Tembesi, is home to one of the palaces.

=== Power struggle ===
After Sultan Thaha Syaifuddin was replaced by Sultan Ahmad Nazaruddin by the Dutch in 1858, the highland Jambi federations declined to take part in the political exchange. this caused a disagreement about the sultanate's authority in the nation. Jambi broke into two kingdoms: Jambi Ilir District with Sultan Ahmad Nazaruddin and Jambi Ulu District with Sultan Thaha Syaifuddin. This was mostly because the latter did not wish to recognize the government's authority after he was crowned. As his predecessor, Sultan Thaha Syaifuddin had symbols of greatness and royal ceremonial instruments, such as the siginjai keris, which is the emblem of the Jambi kingdom, the Jambi people had a very solid attitude toward him and would support him in his battle.

=== Death ===
Sultan Ahmad Nazaruddin wrote to Sultan Thaha Syaifuddin in 1866 pleading for his pardon. Although the letter was sent to the Palembang resident, it was never made public. After he died in 1880, Sultan Muhilluddin took over as sultan.

Regnal titles
Preceded by Thaha Syaifuddin	Sultan of Jambi; 1858–1881	Succeeded by Muhilluddin
