= Batin people =

Ethnic group in Jambi, Sumatra, Indonesia

Batin
Total population
- 70,000 (1998); 72,000 (2005)

Regions with significant populations
- Indonesia (Jambi)

Languages
- Jambi Malay, Indonesian

Religion
- Islam

Related ethnic groups
- Jambi • Kubu • Kerinci

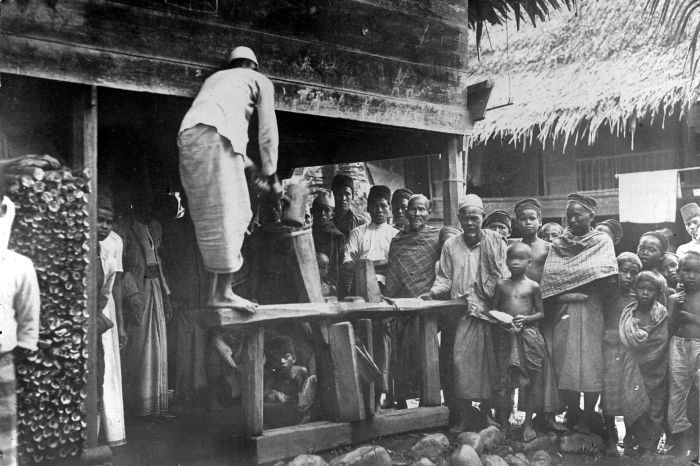
Batin ethnic community in Rantau Panjang around 1914 - 1921

The Batin or Batin Sembilan are a sub-group of Malay people that inhabits the interior parts of Jambi province.

There are approximately 72,000 Batin living in the interior of south-central Sumatra. They speak a dialect of the Jambi variant of Malay, but the accent is similar to Minangkabau language.

The Batin are Muslim, but have a matrilineal kinship system, which is similar to Minangkabau than to Jambi Malays.
