= Thaha Syaifuddin =

Sultan Thaha Syaifuddin
- 20th and 24th Sultan of Jambi
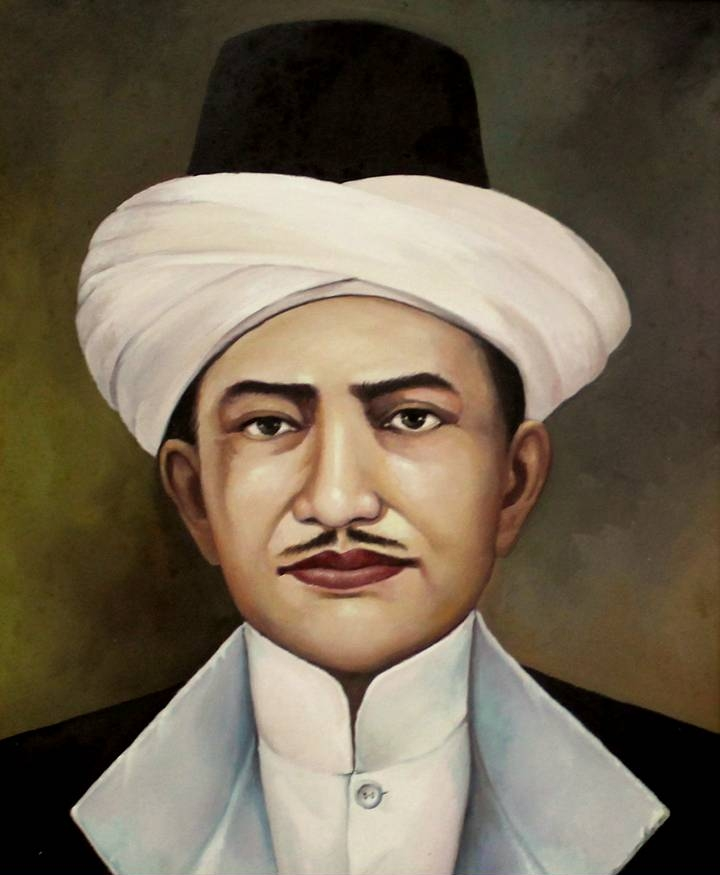
- First Reign: 1855–1858
- Predecessor: Abdul Rahman Nazaruddin
- Successor: Ahmad Nazaruddin
- Second Reign: 1900–1904
- Predecessor: Ahmad Zainul Abidin
- Successor: Monarchy abolished
- Born: 1816; Tanah Pilih, Jambi Sultanate
- Died: 26 April, 1904; Betung Bedarah, Tebo Ilir, Tebo
- Father: Sultan Muhammad Fachruddin

Thaha Syaifuddin (Jawi: طه سيف الدین, 1816–1904) was the 20th and last Sultan of Jambi. He ascended the throne in 1855 succeeding his predecessor, Abdul Rahman Nazaruddin, and ruled until he lost the power struggle. After the demise of Sultan Zainul Abidin in 1900, Sultan Thaha Syaifuddin ascended to the throne for the second time until he died in 1904. His mother was Arab and he was fully literate, being able to read and write.

== Reign ==
Thaha Syaifuddin became Sultan of Jambi in 1855. He was a very energetic sultan. However, he refused to renew treaties imposed on his predecessors by the Dutch, who invaded Jambi in 1858 and imposed a series of sultans who, under Dutch control, reigned over much of the sultanate until 1899. Thaha, however, continued to claim the sultanate and to rule over its less accessible parts until he was killed by Dutch soldiers in 1904.

== Death ==
Thaha Syaifuddin was killed in 1904 by Dutch soldiers in Betung Bedarah Tebo llir, Tebo. In 1977, he was elevated to National Hero of Indonesia, the country's highest honor and also the sultan has been commemorated in the name of Sultan Thaha Airport in Jambi since 1978. He was succeeded by Sultan Abdurrachman Thaha Syaifuddin in 2012.

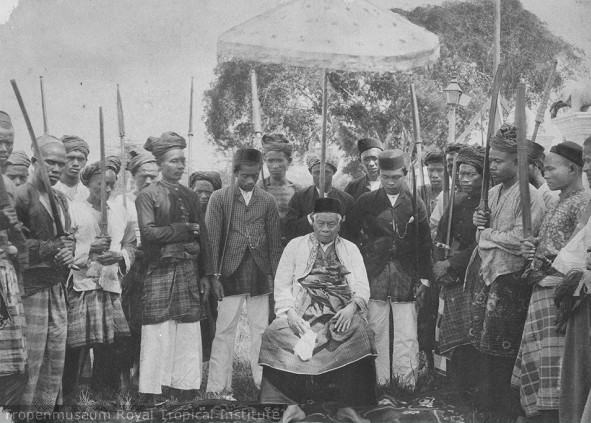
Group Portrait of Sultan Thaha Syaifuddin Jambi and his followers.

Regnal titles
Preceded by Abdurrahman Nazaruddin	Sultan of Jambi; 1858–1904	Succeeded by Position abolished
