= Tebo Regency =

Regency in Jambi, Indonesia

Coordinates: 1°23′00″S 102°19′01″E

Tebo Regency Kabupaten Tebo
- Regency
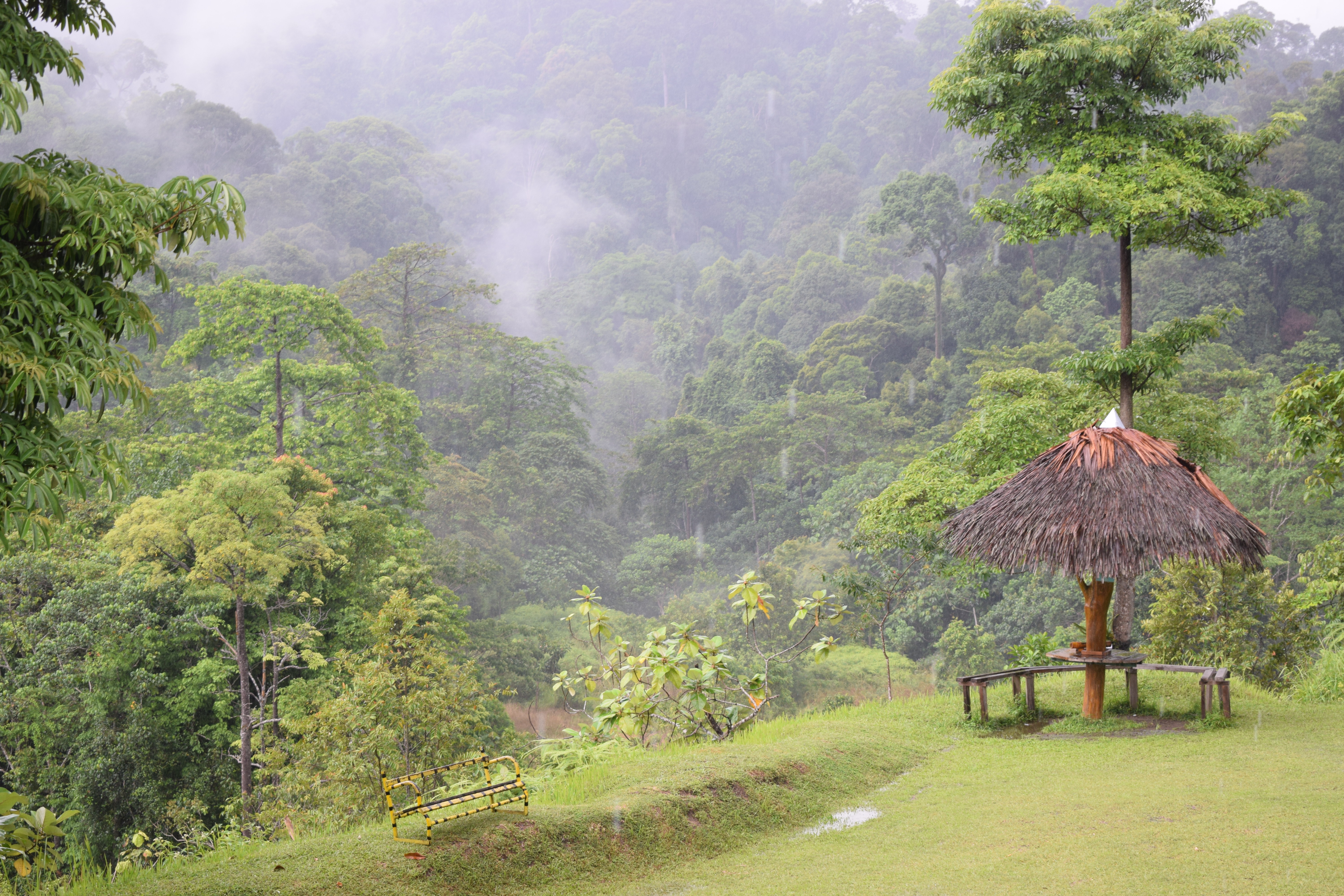
- Bukit Tiga Puluh National Park

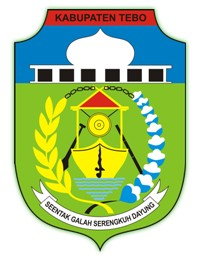
- Coat of arms
- Motto: Seentak Galah Serengkuh Dayung (Together thrust by pole, row by paddle)
- Country: Indonesia
- Province: Jambi
- Regency seat: Muara Tebo

Government
  - Regent: Agus Rubiyanto
  - Vice Regent: Nazar Efendi

Area
  - Total: 6,103.74 km^{2} (2,356.67 sq mi)

Population (mid 2025 estimate)
  - Total: 359,638
  - Density: 58.9209/km^{2} (152.604/sq mi)
- Time zone: UTC+7 (WIB)
- Website: tebokab.go.id

Tebo Regency is a regency of Jambi Province, Indonesia. It is located on the island of Sumatra, and was created on 4 October 1999 by the division of the former Bungo Tebo Regency into a new Bungo Regency in the west and this Tebo Regency in the east. The Tebo regency has an area of 6,103.74 km² and had a population of 297,735 at the 2010 Census and 337,669 at the 2020 Census; the official estimate as at mid 2025 was 359,638 (comprising 184,092 males and 175,546 females). The regency seat is at the town of Muara Tebo.

== Administrative districts ==
The twelve districts (kecamatan) currently forming the Regency are listed below with their areas and their populations at the 2010 and 2020 Censuses, together with the official estimates as at mid 2025. The table also includes the locations of the district administrative centres, the number of villages in each district (a total of 107 rural desa and 5 urban kelurahan), and its post code.

Kode Wilayah	Name of District (kecamatan)	Area in km^{2}	Pop'n Census 2010	Pop'n Census 2020	Pop'n Estimate mid 2025	Admin centre	No. of districts	Post code
15.09.02	Tebo Ilir	398.75	25,009	28,314	30,061	Sungai Bengkal	11 ^{(a)}	37572
15.09.12	Muara Tabir	680.18	15,593	17,128	17,921	Pintas Tuo	8	37570
15.09.01	Tebo Tengah	459.35	34,345	40,161	43,311	Muara Tebo	12 ^{(b)}	37571
15.09.05	Sumay	1,215.06	17,585	21,398	23,525	Teluk Singkawang	12	37573
15.09.09	Tengah Ilir	611.20	19,220	25,968	30,032	Mangupeh	5	37574
15.09.04	Rimbo Bujang	470.70	59,821	63,320	65,072	Wirotho Agung	8 ^{(c)}	37551
15.09.07	Rimbo Ulu	274.84	34,780	37,586	39,016	Suka Damai	6	37553
15.09.08	Rimbo Ilir	172.22	21,412	23,408	24,435	Karang Dadi	9	37552
15.09.03	Tebo Ulu	288.70	31,335	33,011	33,847	Pulau Temiang	17 ^{(d)}	37555
15.09.06	VII Koto	529.81	17,858	19,958	21,057	Sungai Abang	10	37561
15.09.10	Serai Serumpun	552.43	7,578	9,551	10,680	Sekutur Jaya	8	37554
15.09.11	VII Koto Ilir	550.49	13,199	17,866	20,681	Balai Rajo	6	37562
	Total Regency	6,103.74	297,735	337,669	359,638	Muara Tebo	112	

Notes: (a) includes the kelurahan of Sungai Bengkal. (b) includes 2 kelurahan - Muara Tebo and Tebing Tinggi.
(c) includes the kelurahan of Wirotho Agung. (d) includes the kelurahan of Pulau Temiang.
