= Oombabeer, Queensland =

Oombabeer
- Suburb
- Interactive map of Oombabeer
- Coordinates: 24.5033°S 149.5269°E
- Country: Australia
- State: Queensland
- LGA: Central Highlands Region
- Location: 67.2 km (41.8 mi) W of Moura; 132 km (82 mi) W of Biloela; 232 km (144 mi) SW of Rockhampton; 246 km (153 mi) SE of Emerald; 621 km (386 mi) NNW of Brisbane

Government
  - State electorate: Gregory
  - Federal division: Flynn

Area
  - Total: 858.4 km^{2} (331.4 sq mi)

Population
  - Total: 45 (2021 census)
  - Density: 0.0524/km^{2} (0.1358/sq mi)
- Time zone: UTC+10:00 (AEST)
- Postcode: 4718
Suburbs around Oombabeer
Goomally	Mimosa	Mimosa
Goomally	Oombabeer	Roundstone
Bauhinia	Rhydding	Rhydding

Oombabeer is a rural locality in the Central Highlands Region, Queensland, Australia. In the 2021 census, Oombabeer had a population of 45 people.

== Geography ==
The Fitzroy Developmental Road follows the western boundary, cutting through the western extremity for a short distance. The Dawson Highway runs along most of the southern boundary.

The land use is mostly grazing on native vegetation with some crop growing, mostly along Zamia Creek.

== Demographics ==
In the 2016 census, Oombabeer had a population of 57 people.

In the 2021 census, Oombabeer had a population of 45 people.

== Education ==
There are no schools in Oombabeer. The nearest government primary schools are Bauhinia State School in neighbouring Bauhinia to the south-west, Moura State School in Moura to the east, and Baralaba State School in Baralaba to the north-east. The nearest government secondary schools are Baralaba State School (to Year 10) and Moura State High School (to Year 12) in Moura. However, students living in the west of Oombabeer might be too distant from Moura for a daily commute; the alternatives are distance education and boarding school.
