= Aboriginal Shire of Woorabinda =

- Local government area

- Interactive map of Aboriginal Shire of Woorabinda
- Coordinates: 24°7′S 149°27′E
- Country: Australia
- State: Queensland
- Region: Central Queensland
- Council seat: Woorabinda

Government
  - Mayor: Joshua Mark Weazel
  - State electorate: Gregory
  - Federal division: Flynn

Area
  - Total: 391 km^{2} (151 sq mi)

Population
  - Total: 1,019 (2021 census)
  - Density: 2.606/km^{2} (6.750/sq mi)
- Website: Aboriginal Shire of Woorabinda
LGAs around Aboriginal Shire of Woorabinda
Central Highlands	Central Highlands	Rockhampton
Central Highlands	Woorabinda	Central Highlands
Central Highlands	Central Highlands	Central Highlands

The Aboriginal Shire of Woorabinda is a local government area in Central Queensland, Australia.

In the 2021 census, the Aboriginal Shire of Woorabinda had a population of 1,019 people.

== Geography ==
Most local government areas are a single contiguous area (possibly including islands). However, Aboriginal Shires are often defined as a number of disjoint areas each containing an Indigenous community. In the case of the Aboriginal Shire of Woorabinda, the distinct regions are:

- part of the locality of Balcomba (remainder in Central Highlands Region)
- part of the locality of Bauhinia (remainder in Central Highlands Region)
- part of the locality of Duaringa (remainder in Central Highlands Region)
- part of the locality of Wallaroo (remainder in Central Highlands Region)
- the town and locality of Woorabinda (entirely in the Aboriginal Shire of Woorabinda)

== History ==
Wadja (also known as Wadjigu, Wadya, Wadjainngo, Mandalgu, and Wadjigun) is an Australian Aboriginal language in Central Queensland. The language region includes the local government areas of the Aboriginal Shire of Woorabinda and Central Highlands Region, including the Blackdown Tablelands. the Comet River, and the Expedition Range, and the towns of Woorabinda, Springsure and Rolleston.

== Demographics ==
In the 2016 census, the Aboriginal Shire of Woorabinda had a population of 962 people.

In the 2021 census, the Aboriginal Shire of Woorabinda had a population of 1,019 people.

== Amenities ==
Woorabinda Shire Council operate an Indigenous Knowledge Centre at Woorabinda.

== Mayors ==
=== 2007–present ===
No.	Portrait	Mayor	Party	Term start	Term end	Notes
		Lawrence Weazel	Independent	2007	3 April 2008	Lost re-election
		Roderick William Tobane	Independent	3 April 2008	2011	Resigned
		Christopher Paul Adams	Independent	2011	13 March 2012	Removed from office after being jailed for driving while disqualified
−		Steven Kemp	Independent	13 March 2012	28 April 2012	Acting mayor until 2012 election
		Terence Munns	Independent	28 April 2012	19 March 2016	
		Cheyne (Shane) Wilkie	Independent	19 March 2016	25 October 2019	Resigned amid serious misconduct allegations
		Josh Weazel	Team Josh Weazel	28 March 2020	2020	Lost re-election
		Josh Weazel	Independent	2020	16 March 2024	Lost re-election
		Terence Munns	Independent	16 March 2024	present	Incumbent
