= Mungabunda, Queensland =

Mungabunda
- Suburb
- Interactive map of Mungabunda
- Coordinates: 24.8763°S 149.2108°E
- Country: Australia
- State: Queensland
- LGA: Central Highlands Region
- Location: 44.5 km (27.7 mi) SSW of Bauhinia; 116 km (72 mi) WSW of Moura; 260 km (160 mi) SE of Emerald; 266 km (165 mi) SW of Rockhampton; 658 km (409 mi) NW of Brisbane

Government
  - State electorate: Gregory
  - Federal division: Flynn

Area
  - Total: 1,765.3 km^{2} (681.6 sq mi)

Population
  - Total: 91 (2021 census)
  - Density: 0.05155/km^{2} (0.1335/sq mi)
- Time zone: UTC+10:00 (AEST)
- Postcode: 4718
Suburbs around Mungabunda
Dromedary	Bauhinia	Rhydding
Arcadia Valley	Mungabunda	Rhydding
Glenhaughton	Glenhaughton	Coorada

Mungabunda is a rural locality in the Central Highlands Region, Queensland, Australia. In the 2021 census, Mungabunda had a population of 91 people.

== Geography ==
The Dawson Highway passes to the north and the Fitzroy Developmental Road to the east.

== Demographics ==
In the 2016 census, Mungabunda had a population of 74 people.

In the 2021 census, Mungabunda had a population of 91 people.

== Education ==
There are no schools in Mungabunda. The nearest government primary school is Bauhinia State School in neighbouring Bauhinia to the north. However, students living in southern Mungabunda may be too distant for a daily commute. There are no secondary schools nearby. The alternatives are distance education and boarding school.
