= Barnard, Queensland =

Barnard
- Suburb
- Interactive map of Barnard
- Coordinates: 24.0077°S 149.6838°E
- Country: Australia
- State: Queensland
- LGA: Central Highlands Region
- Location: 47.3 km (29.4 mi) NNW of Baralaba; 152 km (94 mi) SW of Rockhampton; 186 km (116 mi) ESE of Emerald; 699 km (434 mi) NNW of Brisbane

Government
  - State electorate: Gregory
  - Federal division: Flynn

Area
  - Total: 668.6 km^{2} (258.1 sq mi)

Population
  - Total: 32 (2021 census)
  - Density: 0.0479/km^{2} (0.1240/sq mi)
- Time zone: UTC+10:00 (AEST)
- Postcode: 4702
Suburbs around Barnard
| Coomoo | Duaringa | Gainsford |
| Coomoo | Barnard | Kokotungo |
| Mimosa | Alberta | Kokotungo |

Barnard is a rural locality in the Central Highlands Region, Queensland, Australia. In the 2021 census, Barnard had a population of 32 people.

== Geography ==
The Dawson River forms the eastern boundary.

The Fitzroy Developmental Road passes to the west of the locality, but does not enter it. The Duaringa Baralaba Road enters the locality from the north (Duaringa), travels through the east of the locality, and exits to the south (Alberta).

Coal mining occurs in the south-east of the locality. There is some crop growing in the east of the locality near the river, but predominantly the land use is grazing on native vegetation.

== Demographics ==
In the 2016 census, Barnard had a population of 29 people.

In the 2021 census, Barnard had a population of 32 people.

== Education ==
There are no schools in Barnard. The nearest government primary schools are Baralaba State School in Baralaba to the south, Duaringa State School in neighbouring Duaringa to the north, and Woorabinda State School in Woorabinda to the south-west. The nearest government secondary school is Baralaba State School (to Year 10). There are no nearby schools providing education to Year 12; the alternatives are distance education and boarding school.
