= Humboldt, Queensland =

Humboldt
- Suburb
- Interactive map of Humboldt
- Coordinates: 24.2922°S 148.9250°E
- Country: Australia
- State: Queensland
- LGA: Central Highlands Region
- Location: 49.6 km (30.8 mi) NE of Rolleston; 96.2 km (59.8 mi) S of Blackwater; 143 km (89 mi) SE of Emerald; 290 km (180 mi) SW of Rockhampton; 718 km (446 mi) NW of Brisbane

Government
  - State electorate: Gregory
  - Federal division: Flynn

Area
  - Total: 2,033.1 km^{2} (785.0 sq mi)

Population
  - Total: 49 (2021 census)
  - Density: 0.02410/km^{2} (0.0624/sq mi)
- Time zone: UTC+10:00 (AEST)
- Postcode: 4702
Suburbs around Humboldt
Togara	Stewarton	Blackdown; Wooroona
Lowesby	Humboldt	Goomally
Coorumbene	Arcadia Valley	Dromedary

Humboldt is a rural locality in the Central Highlands Region, Queensland, Australia. In the 2021 census, Humboldt had a population of 49 people.

== Geography ==
The Dawson Highway forms the southern boundary of the locality and the ridgeline of the Expedition Range (24.2166°S 149.05°E) forms the eastern boundary.

There are a number of protected areas:

- Shotover State Forest in the north-east of the locality
- Expedition State Forect in the south-east
- Humboldt State Forest and the Humboldt National Park in the centre

The Shotover Range (24.1666°S 149.0000°E) runs north-south through the centre of the locality including the national park.

Apart from these protected areas, the predominant land use is grazing on native vegetation.

Letter Camp (24.1°S 148.8°E). and Wilsons Camp (24.0833°S 148.8333°E) are two neighhourhoods in the north-west of the locality.

There are a number of homesteads in the locality:

- Bundaburra (24.4388°S 148.9076°E)
- Bungawarra (24.4554°S 148.9599°E) with airstrip (24.4599°S 148.9543°E)
- Humboldt (24.0968°S 148.8242°E)
- Katrina (24.3867°S 148.8499°E)
- Kulandra (24.0521°S 148.9383°E)
- Old Redrock (24.1017°S 148.9234°E)
- Penrose (24.0621°S 148.8385°E)
- Planet Downs (24.5305°S 148.8856°E) with airstrip (24.5378°S 148.8896°E)
- Rockland Springs (23.9862°S 148.9914°E)
- Somerby (24.2109°S 148.7403°E) with airstrip (24.2042°S 148.7383°E)
- Sunlight (24.3072°S 148.7948°E)
- Washpool (24.2012°S 148.8249°E) with airstrip (24.2027°S 148.8313°E).
- Wybalena with airstrip (24.2895°S 148.7985°E)

== History ==
Expedition Range was named on 27 November 1844 by explorer Ludwig Leichhardt who described it as "particularly striking and imposing".

== Demographics ==
In the 2016 census, Humboldt had a population of 13 people.

In the 2021 census, Humboldt had a population of 49 people.

== Education ==
There are no schools in the locality. The nearest government primary schools are Rolleston State School in Rolleston to the south-west and Blackwater State School in Blackwater to the north. The nearest government secondary school is Blackwater State High School in Blackwater; however, some parts of the locality are so distant that distance education and boarding schools would be alternatives.
