= Coomoo, Queensland =

Coomoo
- Suburb
- Interactive map of Coomoo
- Coordinates: 23.8605°S 149.5152°E
- Country: Australia
- State: Queensland
- LGA: Central Highlands Region
- Location: 27.2 km (16.9 mi) SSW of Duaringa; 53.0 km (32.9 mi) NW of Baralaba; 138 km (86 mi) SW of Rockhampton CBD; 173 km (107 mi) ESE of Emerald; 701 km (436 mi) NNW of Brisbane

Government
  - State electorate: Gregory
  - Federal division: Flynn

Area
  - Total: 524.6 km^{2} (202.5 sq mi)

Population
  - Total: 24 (2021 census)
  - Density: 0.0457/km^{2} (0.1185/sq mi)
- Time zone: UTC+10:00 (AEST)
- Postcode: 4702
Suburbs around Coomoo
Dingo	Wallaroo	Duaringa
Dingo	Coomoo	Duaringa
Wooroona	Woorabinda; Mimosa	Barnard

Coomoo is a rural locality in the Central Highlands Region, Queensland, Australia. In the 2021 census, Coomoo had a population of 24 people.

== Geography ==
The Dawson Range forms the south-western boundary of the locality.

The Fitzroy Developmental Road enter the locality from the south (Woorabindai / Mimosa), runs north through the locality, exiting to the north (Wallaroo / Duaringa).

The Dawson Range State Forest occupies the south and south-west of the locality. Apart from this protected area, the land use is predominantly grazing on native vegetation.

== Demographics ==
In the 2016 census, Coomoo had a population of 23 people.

In the 2021 census, Coomoo had a population of 24 people.

== Education ==
There are no schools in Coomoo. The nearest government primary school is Duaringa State School in neighbouring Duaringa to the north-east. The nearest government secondary school is Baralaba State School (to Year 10) in Baralaba to the south-east, but most parts of Coomoo would be too distant to attend this school. Also, there are no nearby schools providing education to Year 12. The alternatives are distance education and boarding school.
