= Dromedary, Queensland =

Dromedary
- Suburb
- Interactive map of Dromedary
- Coordinates: 24.5872°S 149.1213°E
- Country: Australia
- State: Queensland
- LGA: Central Highlands Region
- Location: 16.1 km (10.0 mi) WNW of Bauhinia; 150 km (93 mi) SW of Springsure; 219 km (136 mi) SE of Emerald; 229 km (142 mi) SW of Rockhampton; 632 km (393 mi) NNW of Brisbane

Government
  - State electorate: Gregory
  - Federal division: Flynn

Area
  - Total: 340.1 km^{2} (131.3 sq mi)

Population
  - Total: 0 (2021 census)
  - Density: 0.0000/km^{2} (0.000/sq mi)
- Time zone: UTC+10:00 (AEST)
- Postcode: 4718
Suburbs around Dromedary
| Humboldt | Goomally | Goomally |
| Humboldt | Dromedary | Bauhinia |
| Arcadia Valley | Mungabunda | Mungabunda |

Dromedary is a rural locality in the Central Highlands Region, Queensland, Australia. In the 2021 census, Dromedary had "no people or a very low population".

== Geography ==
The Expedition Range forms the western boundary of the locality.

Dromedary has the following mountains (from north to south):

- Mount Dromedary (24.5397°S 149.2137°E) 279 metres (915 ft)
- Mount Hope (24.5923°S 149.1566°E) 352 metres (1,155 ft)

The Dawson Highway enters the locality from the east (Bauhinia) and exits to the south-west (Arcadia Valley).

The Expedition State Forest is in the west of the locality. Apart from this protected area, the land use is grazing on native vegetation.

== Demographics ==
In the 2016 census, Dromedary had a population of 4 people.

In the 2021 census, Dromedary had "no people or a very low population".

== Education ==
There are no schools in Dromedary. The nearest government primary school is Bauhinia State School in neighbouring Bauhinia to the east. There are no nearby secondary schools; the alternatives are distance education and boarding school.
