= Blackdown, Queensland =

Blackdown
- Suburb
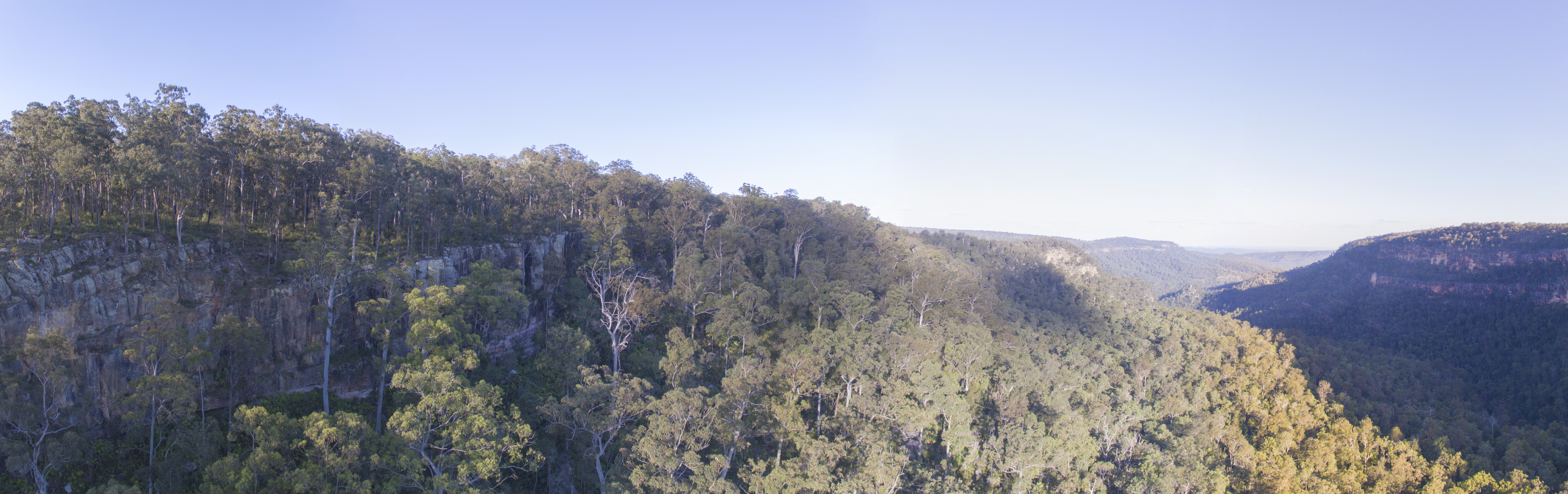
- Mook Mook lookout panorama, Blackdown Tableland National Park, October 2016

- Interactive map of Blackdown
- Coordinates: 23.8930°S 149.1261°E
- Country: Australia
- State: Queensland
- LGA: Central Highlands Region
- Location: 38.5 km (23.9 mi) SW of Dingo; 62.0 km (38.5 mi) SE of Blackwater; 136 km (85 mi) ESE of Emerald; 185 km (115 mi) WSW of Rockhampton; 805 km (500 mi) NNW of Brisbane

Government
  - State electorate: Gregory
  - Federal division: Flynn

Area
  - Total: 588.9 km^{2} (227.4 sq mi)

Population
  - Total: 0 (2021 census)
  - Density: 0.0000/km^{2} (0.0000/sq mi)
- Time zone: UTC+10:00 (AEST)
- Postcode: 4702
Suburbs around Blackdown
Stewarton	Dingo	Dingo
Stewarton	Blackdown	Wooroona
Humboldt	Humboldt	Wooroona

Blackdown is a rural locality in the Central Highlands Region, Queensland, Australia. In the 2021 census, Blackdown had "no people or a very low population".

== Geography ==
The Blackdown Tableland National Park lies in the north, west, and centre of the locality. The Dawson Range State Forest is in the east of the locality and the Shotover State Forest is in the south of the locality.

The locality is within the North East Coast drainage basin, specifically within the catchment of the Fitzroy River.

== Demographics ==
In the 2016 census, Blackdown had "no people or a very low population".

In the 2021 census, Blackdown had "no people or a very low population".

== Education ==
There are no schools in Blackdown. The nearest government primary schools are Blackwater State School in Blackwater to the north-west, Dingo State School in neighbouring Dingo to the north, and Woorabinda State School in Woorabinda to the south-east. The nearest government secondary school is Blackwater State High School, also in Blackwater.

Wadja Wadja High School is a private secondary school in Woorabinda.

There are no nearby government secondary schools and some students would be too distant to attend any of these schools; the alternatives are distance education and boarding school.
