= Don Seccombe =

Australian cricketer

6th Mayor of Redland
- In office June 2001 – 15 March 2008
- Preceded by: Eddie Santagiuliana
- Succeeded by: Melva Hobson

Personal details
- Born: Donald Harry Seccombe; 3 April 1942 (age 84) Goomeri, Queensland, Australia
- Cricket career

Personal information
- Batting: Right-handed
- Role: Batsman
- Relatives: Wade Seccombe (nephew)

Domestic team information
- Years: Team
- 1963–1965: Queensland

Career statistics
Competition	FC
Matches	4
Runs scored	212
Batting average	26.50
100s/50s	0/1
Top score	58
Balls bowled	8
Wickets	0
Bowling average	n/a
5 wickets in innings	0
10 wickets in match	0
Best bowling	0/11
Catches/stumpings	1/0
- Source: CricketArchive, 6 March 2014

Donald Harry Seccombe AM (born 3 April 1942) is a former Australian politician and cricketer who played several first-class matches for Queensland during the early 1960s, and later served in local government as the mayor of Redland Shire.

== Biography ==
Born in Goomeri, Queensland, Seccombe was one of three cricketing brothers who played matches for Queensland Country representative sides during the 1960s (the others being Roger and Colin), though he was the only one to progress to the state team. A right-handed middle-order batsman, he made his first-class debut in the 1962–63 season of the Sheffield Shield, playing two matches (home and away) against Victoria. On debut at the Melbourne Cricket Ground, Seccombe scored 58 runs coming in sixth in Queensland's first innings, partnering with Des Bull (152) for a 118-run partnership for the fifth wicket. In the second match, at the Gabba, he scored 48 and 41, putting on 104 for the fourth wicket with Graham Bizzell in Queensland's second innings.

Seccombe's third and fourth matches for Queensland came two seasons later, home games against South Australia and Victoria in January and February 1965, respectively. In what were his last matches for the team, he scored only 57 runs over four innings. He was promoted to first drop behind Bull and Sam Trimble in the match against Victoria, and was caught by Bob Cowper for a duck off of Alan Connolly's bowling, who finished with figures of 9/67 in Queensland's first innings. He continued playing for country-based representative sides until the late 1970s, playing several times against touring international sides. Outside of sports, Seccombe was at one stage national sales manager for Incitec Ltd., a fertiliser manufacturer. A founder (and past president) of both the Redlands Sporting Club and the Redland Foundation, and later president of Clubs Queensland, he served as mayor of Redland Shire from 2001 to until the 2008 election, which he did not contest. He was named a Member of the Order of Australia (AM) in the 2014 Queen's Birthday Honours, for "significant service to the community, particularly through cricket administration and the clubs industry". Seccombe's nephew, Wade Seccombe, was also a notable cricketer, playing over 100 Shield matches as Queensland's wicket-keeper from the early 1990s to the early 2000s.
