= Mimosa, Queensland =

Mimosa
- Suburb
- Interactive map of Mimosa
- Coordinates: 24.2813°S 149.5919°E
- Country: Australia
- State: Queensland
- LGA: Central Highlands Region
- Location: 32.0 km (19.9 mi) WSW of Baralaba; 67.3 km (41.8 mi) NW of Moura; 185 km (115 mi) WSW of Rockhampton; 227 km (141 mi) SE of Emerald; 680 km (420 mi) NW of Brisbane

Government
  - State electorate: Gregory
  - Federal division: Flynn

Area
  - Total: 1,174.0 km^{2} (453.3 sq mi)

Population
  - Total: 23 (2021 census)
  - Density: 0.0196/km^{2} (0.0507/sq mi)
- Time zone: UTC+10:00 (AEST)
- Postcode: 4702
Suburbs around Mimosa
Woorabinda	Coomoo	Barnard
Goomally	Mimosa	Alberta
Oombabeer	Oombabeer	Roundstone

Mimosa is a rural locality in the Central Highlands Region, Queensland, Australia. In the 2021 census, Mimosa had a population of 23 people.

== Geography ==
The Dawson Range forms part of the locality's northern boundary and then passes through the locality until it reaches the eastern boundary, where it then forms most of its eastern and south-eastern boundary. Mount Dawson (24.1224°S 149.6310°E) is part of the range and rises to 317 metres (1,040 ft) above sea level within the north-east of the locality.

The Fitzroy Developmental Road enters the locality from the west (Goomally) and continues north, forming most of the north-western boundary of the locality before exiting to the north (Coomoo).

The Dawson Range State Forest is in the north and east of the locality, extending into neighbouring Coomoo and Barnard to the north and Alberta to the east. Redcliffe State Forest is in the centre of the locality. Apart from these protected areas, the land use is predominantly grazing on native vegetation with a small amount of crop growing in the south of the locality.

== Demographics ==
In the 2016 census, Mimosa had a population of 31 people.

In the 2021 census, Mimosa had a population of 23 people.

== Education ==
There are no schools in Mimosa. The nearest government primary schools are Woorabinda State School in neighbouring Woorabinda to the north-west, Baralaba State School in Baralaba to the east, and Moura State School in Moura to the south-east. The nearest government secondary schools are Baralaba State School (to Year 10) and Moura State High School (to Year 12), also in Moura. However, these secondary schools may be too distant for some students in Mimosa; the alternatives are distance education and boarding school.
