= Wooroona, Queensland =

Wooroona
- Suburb
- Interactive map of Wooroona
- Coordinates: 24.0219°S 149.2730°E
- Country: Australia
- State: Queensland
- LGA: Central Highlands Region
- Location: 32.4 km (20.1 mi) NNW of Woorabinda; 161 km (100 mi) NW of Biloela; 166 km (103 mi) SW of Rockhampton; 200 km (120 mi) ESE of Emerald; 701 km (436 mi) NW of Brisbane

Government
  - State electorate: Gregory
  - Federal division: Flynn

Area
  - Total: 844.5 km^{2} (326.1 sq mi)

Population
  - Total: 12 (2021 census)
  - Density: 0.0142/km^{2} (0.0368/sq mi)
- Time zone: UTC+10:00 (AEST)
- Postcode: 4702
Suburbs around Wooroona
Blackdown	Dingo	Coomoo
Humboldt	Wooroona	Woorabinda
Goomally	Goomally	Woorabinda

Wooroona is a rural locality in the Central Highlands Region, Queensland, Australia. In the 2021 census, Wooroona had a population of 12 people.

== Geography ==
The Fitzroy Developmental Road passes to the east.

There are a number of protected areas in the locality:

- Dawson Range State Forest in the north of the locality
- Blackdown Tableland National Park in the north-west of the locality
- Expedition State Forest in the south of the locality

== Demographics ==
In the 2016 census, Wooroona had a population of 10 people.

In the 2021 census, Wooroona had a population of 12 people.

== Education ==
There are no schools in Wooroona. The nearest government primary school is Woorabinda State School in Woorabinda to the east. There is no nearby government secondary school, but Wadja Wadja High School in Woorabinda is a non-government school providing secondary education to Year 12, operated by Wadja Wadja Aboriginal Corporation of Education. Other alternatives are distance education and boarding school.
