= Results of the 2024 Queensland local elections in Central Queensland =

2024 Queensland local elections (Central Queensland)
← 2020	16 March 2024	2028 →

This is a list of results for the 2024 Queensland local elections in the Central Queensland region.

The Central Queensland region encompasses the local government areas (LGAs) of Banana, Central Highlands, Gladstone, Isaac, Livingstone, Rockhampton, and Woorabinda.

== Banana ==
2024 Banana Shire Council election
← 2020	16 March 2024	2028 →

All 6 seats on Banana Shire Council (Note: Excluding the mayor, who is directly-elected.) 4 seats needed for a majority
	First party	Second party
	IND	IND
Party	Independents	Ind. LNP
Last election	5 seats	1 seat
Seats won	3	3
Seat change	▼2	▲2
Largest party before election
Independents
Subsequent largest party
No overall control

Banana Shire Council is a divided council composed of six single-member divisions, utilising optional preferential voting.

=== Banana results ===
2024 Queensland local elections: Banana
Party	Votes	%	Swing	Seats	Change
Independents	2,445	62.90		3	▼2
Independent Liberal National	1,442	37.10		3	▲2
Formal votes	3,887	99.03		–	–
Informal votes	38	0.97		–	–
Total	3,925	100.00	–	6	–

=== Division 1 ===
2024 Queensland local elections: Division 1
Party	Candidate	Votes	%	±%
Independent	Adam Burling	549	46.33	+46.33
Independent	John Ramsey	432	36.46	−13.77
Independent	Jason Williams	204	17.22	−32.55
Total formal votes		1,185	99.00	+1.64
Informal votes		12	1.00	−0.34
Turnout		1,197	69.55	+0.02
Independent gain from Independent		Swing	+46.33	

=== Division 2 ===
2024 Queensland local elections: Division 2
Party	Candidate	Votes	%	±%
Independent LNP	Ashley Jensen	691	50.66	+50.66
Independent	Col Neville	673	49.34	+8.11
Total formal votes		1,364	98.77	−0.17
Informal votes		17	1.23	+0.17
Turnout		1,381	76.76	+3.93
Independent LNP gain from Independent		Swing	+50.66	

- Incumbent councillor Judith Pender (Independent) did not seek re-election

=== Division 3 ===
2024 Queensland local elections: Division 3
Party	Candidate	Votes	%	±%
Independent	Phillip Casey	unopposed		
Independent hold		Swing	N/A	

=== Division 4 ===
2024 Queensland local elections: Division 4
Party	Candidate	Votes	%	±%
Independent LNP	Kerrith Bailey	unopposed		
Independent LNP gain from Independent		Swing	N/A	

- Incumbent councillor Colin Semple (Independent) did not seek re-election

=== Division 5 ===
2024 Queensland local elections: Division 5
Party	Candidate	Votes	%	±%
Independent	Brooke Leo	unopposed		
Independent hold		Swing	N/A	

=== Division 6 ===
2024 Queensland local elections: Division 6
Party	Candidate	Votes	%	±%
Independent LNP	Terri Boyce	751	56.13	+56.13
Independent	Harold Ball	587	43.87	+43.87
Total formal votes		1,338	99.33	+99.33
Informal votes		9	0.67	+0.67
Turnout		1,347	82.74	+82.74
Independent LNP hold		Swing	+56.13	

== Central Highlands ==
2024 Central Highlands Regional Council election
← 2020	16 March 2024	2028 →

All 9 seats on Western Downs Regional Council 5 seats needed for a majority
- Registered: 18,074
- Mayor
- Turnout: 74.22%
	First party	Second party
	IND	IND
Candidate	Janice Moriarty	Kerry Hayes
Party	Independent	Independent
Primary vote	7,666	5,302
Percentage	59.11%	40.89%
Swing	▲59.11	▲40.89
Mayor before election
Kerry Hayes
Independent
Elected Mayor
Janice Moriarty
Independent
- Councillors
- Turnout: 74.10 (▲4.19)
Party	Leader	Vote %	Seats	+/–
Independents	N/A	69.42	5	−1
Ind. LNP	N/A	30.58	3	+1
This lists parties that won seats. See the complete results below.

Central Highlands Regional Council is an undivided council, electing eight councillors through plurality block voting.

=== Central Highlands mayor ===
2024 Queensland mayoral elections: Central Highlands
Party	Candidate	Votes	%	±%
Independent	Janice Moriarty	7,666	59.11	+59.11
Independent	Kerry Hayes	5,302	40.89	+40.89
Total formal votes		12,968	96.67	+96.67
Informal votes		447	3.33	+3.33
Turnout		13,415	74.22	
Independent gain from Independent				

=== Central Highlands results ===
2024 Queensland local elections: Central Highlands
Party	Candidate	Votes	%	±%
Independent	Karen Newman (elected)	9,817	9.99	+9.99
Independent	Craig Hindmarsh (elected)	9,243	9.40	+9.40
Independent	Robert Donaldson (elected)	9,209	9.37	+9.37
Independent LNP	Rachael Cruwys (elected)	9,185	9.34	+9.34
Independent	Gai Sypher (elected)	9,024	9.18	+0.62
Independent	Gillian Wilkins (elected)	8,308	8.45	+8.45
Independent LNP	Christopher Whiteman (elected)	7,793	7.93	+7.93
Independent LNP	Joseph Burns (elected)	6,915	7.03	−1.15
Independent	Loretta Gaudron	6,863	6.98	+6.98
Independent	Bernardine Frawley	6,253	6.36	−0.09
Independent LNP	Charles Brimblecombe	6,174	6.28	−1.43
Independent	Michael McDonald	5,044	5.13	+5.13
Independent	Perry Dedes	4,476	4.55	+4.55
Total formal votes		98,304	100.00	
Total formal ballots		12,288	91.75	−0.91
Informal ballots		1,105	8.25	+0.91
Turnout		13,393	74.10	+4.19

== Gladstone ==
2024 Gladstone Regional Council election
← 2020	16 March 2024	2028 →

All 8 seats on Gladstone Regional Council 5 seats needed for a majority
	First party	Second party	Third party
	IND	IND	IND
Party	Independents	Ind. Labor	Ind. LNP
Last election	4 seats	3 seats	1 seat
Seats won	4	4	0
Seat change	Steady	▲1	▼1
Largest party before election
Independents
Subsequent largest party
No overall control

Gladstone Regional Council is an undivided council, electing eight councillors through plurality block voting.

=== Gladstone results ===
2024 Queensland local elections: Gladstone Regional Council
Party	Candidate	Votes	%	±%
Independent Labor	Natalia Muszkat (elected)	24,418	8.68	+1.68
Independent	Glenn Churchill (elected)	24,028	8.54	+1.42
Independent	Karen Davis (elected)	23,865	8.48	+8.48
Independent Labor	Kahn Goodluck (elected)	23,247	8.26	+0.81
Independent Labor	Mellissa Holzheimer (elected)	22,228	7.90	+7.90
Independent	Michelle Wagner (elected)	21,258	7.56	+2.37
Independent Labor	Leanne Patrick (elected)	19,355	6.88	+6.88
Independent	Simon McClintock (elected)	19,059	6.77	+6.77
Independent	Chris Cameron	19,044	6.77	+1.14
Independent	Jessica Bray	18,501	6.58	+6.58
Independent	Murray Peterson	16,945	6.02	+6.02
Independent	Michael Fearns	12,976	4.61	+4.61
Independent	Paul Van Meteren	12,258	4.36	+4.36
Independent	Craig Tomsett	12,165	4.32	+2.05
Independent	Ben Noll	12,005	4.27	+4.27
Total formal votes		281,352	100.00	
Total formal ballots		35,169	90.30	−0.55
Informal ballots		3,777	9.70	+0.55
Turnout		38,946	82.60	+2.58

== Isaac ==
2024 Isaac Regional Council election
← 2020	16 March 2024	2028 →

All 8 seats on Isaac Regional Council 5 seats needed for a majority
	First party	Second party
	IND	IND
Party	Independents	Ind. Labor
Last election	6 seats	2 seats
Seats won	6	2
Seat change	Steady	Steady
Largest party before election
Independents
Subsequent largest party
Independents

Isaac Regional Council is a divided council composed of eight single-member divisions, utilising optional preferential voting.

=== Isaac results ===
2024 Queensland local elections: Isaac
Party	Votes	%	Swing	Seats	Change
Independents	3,934	100.00		6	Steady
Independent Labor	N/A	N/A	N/A	2	Steady
Formal votes	3,934	97.55		–	–
Informal votes	99	2.45		–	–
Total	4,033	100.00	–	8	–

=== Division 1 ===
2024 Queensland local elections: Division 1
Party	Candidate	Votes	%	±%
Independent	Terry O'Neill	578	61.42	+61.42
Independent	Milissa Payne	363	38.58	+38.58
Total formal votes		941	98.33	N/A
Informal votes		16	1.67	N/A
Turnout		957	69.55	N/A
Independent gain from Independent		Swing	+61.42	

- Incumbent councillor Greg Austen (Independent) did not seek re-election.

=== Division 2 ===
2024 Queensland local elections: Division 2
Party	Candidate	Votes	%	±%
Independent	Verniece Russell	606	60.18	+60.18
Independent	Sandra Moffat	401	39.82	−15.79
Total formal votes		1,007	97.67	−0.51
Informal votes		24	2.33	+0.51
Turnout		1,031	66.34	−5.63
Independent gain from Independent		Swing	+60.18	

=== Division 3 ===
2024 Queensland local elections: Division 3
Party	Candidate	Votes	%	±%
Independent	Melissa Westcott	566	60.21	+60.21
Independent	Renee Cross	374	39.79	+39.79
Total formal votes		940	98.22	N/A
Informal votes		17	1.78	N/A
Turnout		957	65.68	N/A
Independent gain from Independent		Swing	+60.21	

- Incumbent councillor Gina Lacey (Independent) did not seek re-election.

=== Division 4 ===
2024 Queensland local elections: Division 4
Party	Candidate	Votes	%	±%
Independent Labor	Simon West	unopposed		
Independent Labor hold		Swing	N/A	

=== Division 5 ===
2024 Queensland local elections: Division 5
Party	Candidate	Votes	%	±%
Independent Labor	Alaina Earl	unopposed		
Independent Labor hold		Swing	N/A	

- Incumbent councillor Kelly Vea Vea (Ind. Labor) did not seek re-election in order to run in the mayoral election.

=== Division 6 ===
2024 Queensland local elections: Division 6
Party	Candidate	Votes	%	±%
Independent	Jane Pickels	700	66.92	+66.92
Independent	Mark Hodgetts	346	33.08	+33.08
Total formal votes		1,046	96.14	N/A
Informal votes		42	3.86	N/A
Turnout		1,088	78.16	N/A
Independent gain from Independent		Swing	+66.92	

- Incumbent councillor Lyn Jones (Independent) did not seek re-election.

=== Division 7 ===
2024 Queensland local elections: Division 7
Party	Candidate	Votes	%	±%
Independent	Rachel Anderson	unopposed		
Independent gain from Independent		Swing	N/A	

- Incumbent councillor Jane Pickels (Independent) sought re-election in Division 6.

=== Division 8 ===
2024 Queensland local elections: Division 8
Party	Candidate	Votes	%	±%
Independent	Vivienne Coleman	unopposed		
Independent hold		Swing	N/A	

== Livingstone ==
2024 Livingstone Shire Council election
← 2020	16 March 2024	2028 →

All 6 seats on Livingstone Shire Council 4 seats needed for a majority
	First party	Second party
	IND	IND
Party	Independents	Ind. LNP
Last election	5 seats	1 seat
Seats won	6	0
Seat change	▲1	▼1
Largest party before election
Independents
Subsequent largest party
Independents

Livingstone Shire Council is an undivided council, electing six councillors through plurality block voting.

=== Livingstone results ===
2024 Queensland local elections: Livingstone Shire Council
Party	Candidate	Votes	%	±%
Independent	Glenda Mather (elected)	12,635	9.07	−1.29
Independent	Pat Eastwood (elected)	11,975	8.59	−2.18
Independent	Lance Warcon (elected)	11,323	8.12	+8.12
Independent	Rhodes Watson (elected)	10,936	7.85	−0.22
Independent	Andrea Friend (elected)	10,816	7.76	−0.75
Independent	Wade Rothery (elected)	10,285	7.38	+7.38
Independent	Trish Bowman	10,283	7.38	+7.38
Independent	Bill Ludwig	10,246	7.35	+7.35
Independent	Helen Schweikert	9,629	6.91	+6.91
Independent	Jillian Neyland	7,300	5.24	+5.24
Independent	Kristan Casuscelli	6,977	5.01	+5.01
Independent	Brett Svendsen	6,459	4.63	+4.63
Independent	Cameron Kinsey	4,874	3.50	+3.50
Independent	Paul Mitchell	4,840	3.47	+3.47
Independent	Mike Decman	4,096	2.94	+0.84
Total formal votes		139,374	100.00	
Total formal ballots		23,229	92.09	−1.33
Informal ballots		1,995	7.91	+1.33
Turnout		25,224	84.92	+4.20

== Rockhampton ==
2024 Rockhampton Regional Council election
← 2020	16 March 2024	2028 →

All 8 seats on Rockhampton Regional Council 5 seats needed for a majority
- Registered: 59,202
- Mayor
- Turnout: 82.66% (▲4.36)
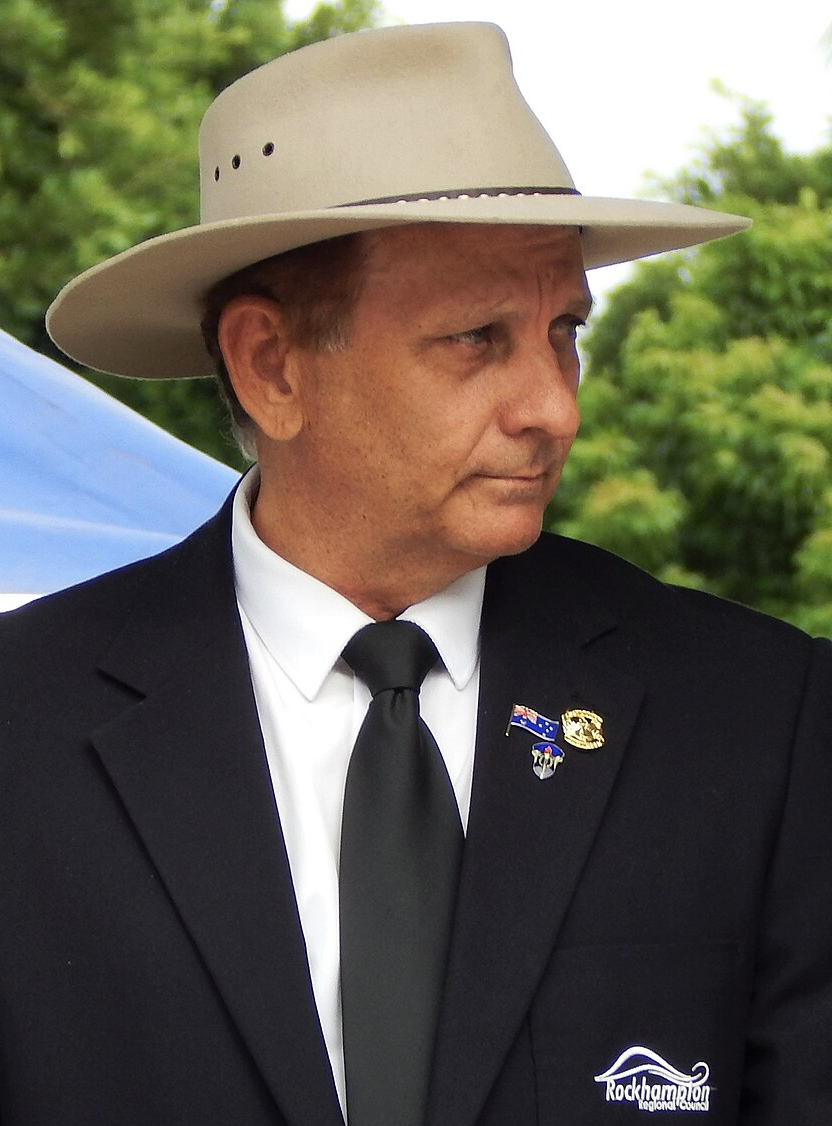
	First party	Second party
		IND
Candidate	Tony Williams	Brett Williams
Party	Ind. Labor	Independent
Primary vote	31,290	15,033
Percentage	67.55%	32.45%
Swing	▲42.73	▲31.94
Mayor before election
Tony Williams
Ind. Labor
Elected Mayor
Tony Williams
Ind. Labor
- Councillors
Party	Leader	Vote %	Seats	+/–
Independents	N/A	95.15	6	0
Ind. Labor	N/A	4.85	1	0
This lists parties that won seats. See the complete results below.

Rockhampton Regional Council is a divided council composed of seven single-member divisions, utilising optional preferential voting.

=== Rockhampton mayor ===
2024 Queensland mayoral elections: Rockhampton
Party	Candidate	Votes	%	±%
Independent Labor	Tony Williams	31,290	67.55	+42.73
Independent	Brett Williams	15,033	32.45	+31.94
Total formal votes		46,323	94.65	−2.79
Informal votes		2,616	5.35	+2.79
Turnout		48,939	82.66	+4.36
Independent Labor hold				

=== Rockhampton results ===
2024 Queensland local elections: Rockhampton
Party	Votes	%	Swing	Seats	Change
Independents	19,805	95.15		6	Steady
Independent Labor	1,009	4.85		1	Steady
Formal votes	20,814	95.47		–	–
Informal votes	988	4.53		–	–
Total	21,802	100.00	–	7	–

=== Division 1 ===
2024 Queensland local elections: Division 1
Party	Candidate	Votes	%	±%
Independent	Shane Latcham	unopposed		
Independent hold		Swing	N/A	

=== Division 2 ===
2024 Queensland local elections: Division 2
Party	Candidate	Votes	%	±%
Independent	Neil Fisher	3,873	55.38	−6.18
Independent	Elliot Hilse	3,120	44.62	+44.62
Total formal votes		6,993	95.74	−0.38
Informal votes		311	4.26	+0.38
Turnout		7,304	91.07	+10.45
Independent hold		Swing	−6.18	

=== Division 3 ===
2024 Queensland local elections: Division 3
Party	Candidate	Votes	%	±%
Independent	Grant Mathers	unopposed		
Independent hold		Swing	N/A	

=== Division 4 ===
2024 Queensland local elections: Division 4
Party	Candidate	Votes	%	±%
Independent	Edward Oram	4,080	54.46	+54.46
Independent	Ellen Smith	3,412	45.54	N/A
Total formal votes		7,492	95.68	N/A
Informal votes		338	4.32	N/A
Turnout		7,830	84.99	N/A
Independent gain from Independent		Swing	+54.46	

=== Division 5 ===
2024 Queensland local elections: Division 5
Party	Candidate	Votes	%	±%
Independent	Cherie Rutherford	unopposed		
Independent hold		Swing	N/A	

=== Division 6 ===
2024 Queensland local elections: Division 6
Party	Candidate	Votes	%	±%
Independent Labor	Drew Wickerson	unopposed		
Independent Labor hold		Swing	N/A	

=== Division 7 ===
2024 Queensland local elections: Division 7
Party	Candidate	Votes	%	±%
Independent	Marika Taylor	3,304	52.20	+52.20
Independent	David Bond	1,337	21.12	+21.12
Independent Labor	Will Field	1,009	15.94	+15.94
Independent	Jamie Scott	679	10.73	+10.73
Total formal votes		6,329	94.92	−0.88
Informal votes		339	5.08	+0.88
Turnout		6,668	83.29	+5.14
Independent hold		Swing	+52.20	

== Woorabinda ==
2024 Woorabinda Aboriginal Shire Council election
← 2020	16 March 2024	2028 →

All 4 seats on Woorabinda Aboriginal Shire Council 3 seats needed for a majority
	First party	Second party
	IND	TJW
Party	Independents	Team Josh Weazel
Last election	2 seats	2 seats
Seats won	4	Did not contest
Seat change	▲2	▼2
Largest party before election
No overall control
Subsequent largest party
Independents

Woorabinda Aboriginal Shire Council is an undivided council, electing four councillors through plurality block voting.

=== Woorabinda results ===
2024 Queensland local elections: Woorabinda Aboriginal Shire Council
Party	Candidate	Votes	%	±%
Independent	Anthony Munns (elected)	223	16.02	+16.02
Independent	Howard Booth (elected)	132	9.48	+9.48
Independent	Wagwan Savage (elected)	131	9.41	−0.83
Independent	Stewart Smith (elected)	130	9.34	+9.34
Independent	Adrian Williams	118	8.48	+8.48
Independent	Damien Watson	115	8.26	+8.26
Independent	Marileen Young	115	8.26	+8.26
Independent	Rhonda Hill	104	7.47	+7.47
Independent	Vincent Ghilotti	91	6.54	−3.7
Independent	Stewart Major	85	6.11	+6.11
Independent	Les Murgha	84	6.03	+6.03
Independent	Laurence Weazel	64	4.60	−5.64
Total formal votes		1,392	100.00	
Total formal ballots		348	99.15	+0.96
Informal ballots		3	0.85	−0.96
Turnout		351	63.59	−20.81
