= List of mayors of Redland =

Mayor of Redland
- Incumbent; Jos Mitchell since 16 March 2024
- Term length: 4 years
- Inaugural holder: J. H. N. Price
- Formation: 1949

This is a list of mayors and chairmen of the City of Redland (formerly the Shire of Redland), a local government area of Queensland, Australia.

The current mayor is Jos Mitchell, who was elected in 2024.

== Mayors and chairmen ==
=== 1949−present ===
No.	Portrait	Mayor	Party	Term start	Term end	Notes
1		J. H. N. Price	Independent	June 1949	April 1961	
2		E. G. W. Wood	Independent	April 1961	March 1982	
3		Merv Genrich (1939/40−2018)	Independent	March 1982	March 1991	Lost re-election
4		Len Keogh (1931−2007)	Independent Labor	March 1991	March 1994	Lost re-election
5		Eddie Santagiuliana (1945−2001)	Independent Liberal	March 1994	22 April 2001	Councillor from 1982 to 1994. Died in office
6		Don Seccombe (1942−)	Independent	June 2001	15 March 2008	Did not seek re-election
7		Melva Hobson	Independent	15 March 2008	28 April 2012	Lost re-election
8		Karen Williams	Independent	28 April 2012	17 May 2021	Did not seek re-election
8		Karen Williams	Independent LNP	17 May 2021	16 March 2024	Did not seek re-election
9		Jos Mitchell	Jos Mitchell Leading Change	16 March 2024	present	Incumbent

== Electoral results ==
=== 2024 ===
2024 Queensland mayoral elections: Redland
Party	Candidate	Votes	%	±%
Leading Change	Jos Mitchell	52,599	52.20	+52.20
Independent	Andrew Laming	25,966	25.77	+25.77
Independent	Cindy Corrie	22,191	22.02	+22.02
Total formal votes		100,756	96.36	+0.70
Informal votes		3,808	3.64	−0.70
Turnout		104,564	86.98	+5.60
Two-candidate-preferred result
Leading Change	Jos Mitchell	60,280	67.67	+67.67
Independent	Andrew Laming	28,803	32.33	+32.33
Leading Change gain from Independent LNP		Swing	N/A	

- Incumbent mayor Karen Williams (Independent, later Independent LNP) did not recontest

=== 2012 ===
2012 Queensland mayoral elections: Redland
Party	Candidate	Votes	%	±%
Independent	Karen Williams	52,249	69.51	
Independent	Melva Hobson	22,914	30.49	
Turnout		78,283	83.81	
Independent gain from Independent		Swing		
