= Goomally, Queensland =

Goomally
- Suburb
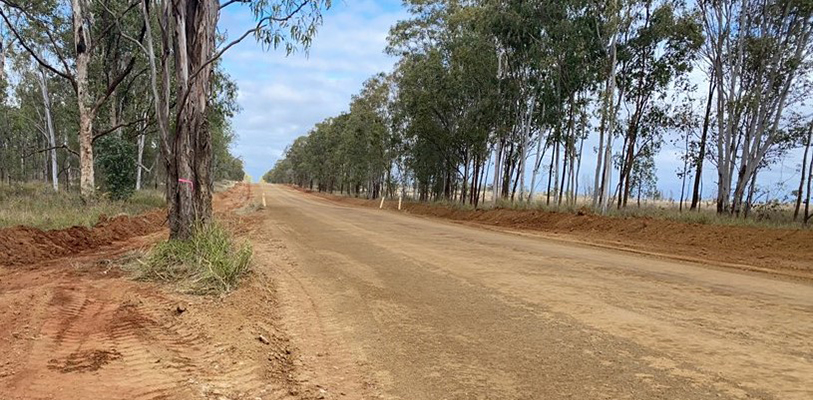
- Fitzroy Developmental Road, passing through Goomally, 2024

- Interactive map of Goomally
- Coordinates: 24.2597°S 149.2827°E
- Country: Australia
- State: Queensland
- LGA: Central Highlands Region
- Location: 45.4 km (28.2 mi) N of Bauhinia; 67.4 km (41.9 mi) W of Baralaba; 227 km (141 mi) SE of Emerald; 193 km (120 mi) SW of Rockhampton; 662 km (411 mi) NNW of Brisbane

Government
  - State electorate: Gregory
  - Federal division: Flynn

Area
  - Total: 1,324.3 km^{2} (511.3 sq mi)

Population
  - Total: 5 (2021 census)
  - Density: 0.0038/km^{2} (0.0098/sq mi)
- Time zone: UTC+10:00 (AEST)
- Postcode: 4702
Suburbs around Goomally
Humboldt	Wooroona	Woorabinda
Humboldt	Goomally	Mimosa
Humboldt	Dromedary; Bauhinia	Oombabeer

Goomally is a rural locality in the Central Highlands Region, Queensland, Australia. In the 2021 census, Goomally had "no people or a very low population".

== Geography ==
The Fitzroy Developmental Road enters the locality from the south-east (Oombabeer) and heads north, following the eastern boundary of the locality and then passes through the eastern extremity of the locality before exiting to the east (Mimosa).

Black Mountain is in the north of the locality (24.1693°S 149.2404°E), rising to 391 metres (1,283 ft) above sea level.

The Expedition State Forest occupies the north and west parts of the locality. Apart from this protected area, the land use is predominantly grazing on native vegetation.

== Demographics ==
In the 2016 census, Goomally had a population of 22 people.

In the 2021 census, Goomally had "no people or a very low population".

== Education ==
There are no schools in Goomally. The nearest government primary schools are Bauhinia State School in neighbouring Bauhinia to the south and Woorabinda State School in Woorabinda to the north-east. The nearest government secondary school is Baralaba State School (to Year 10) in Baralaba to the east; however, it would be too distant for students from most of the locality to attend with the alternatives being distance education and boarding school.
