= 2008 Gold Coast City Council election =

Local elections in Australia

- 15 March 2008
- Mayoral election
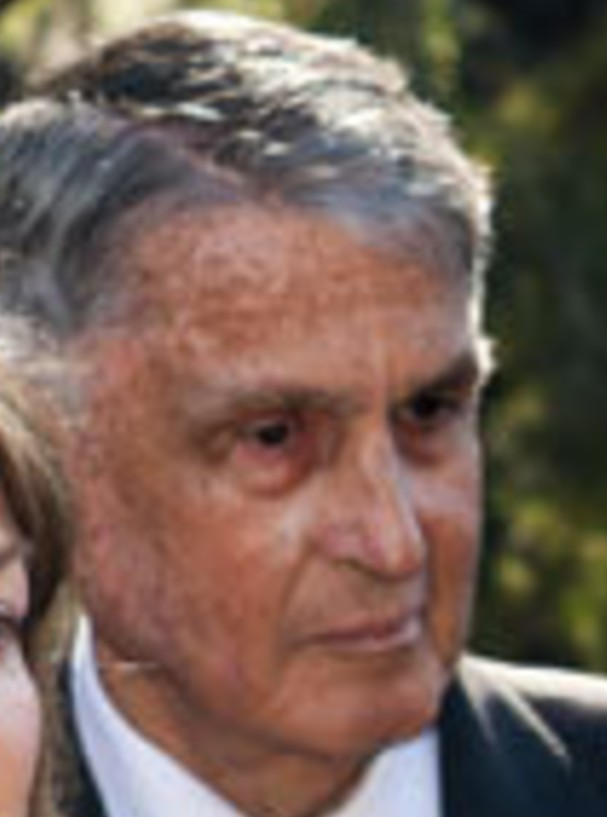

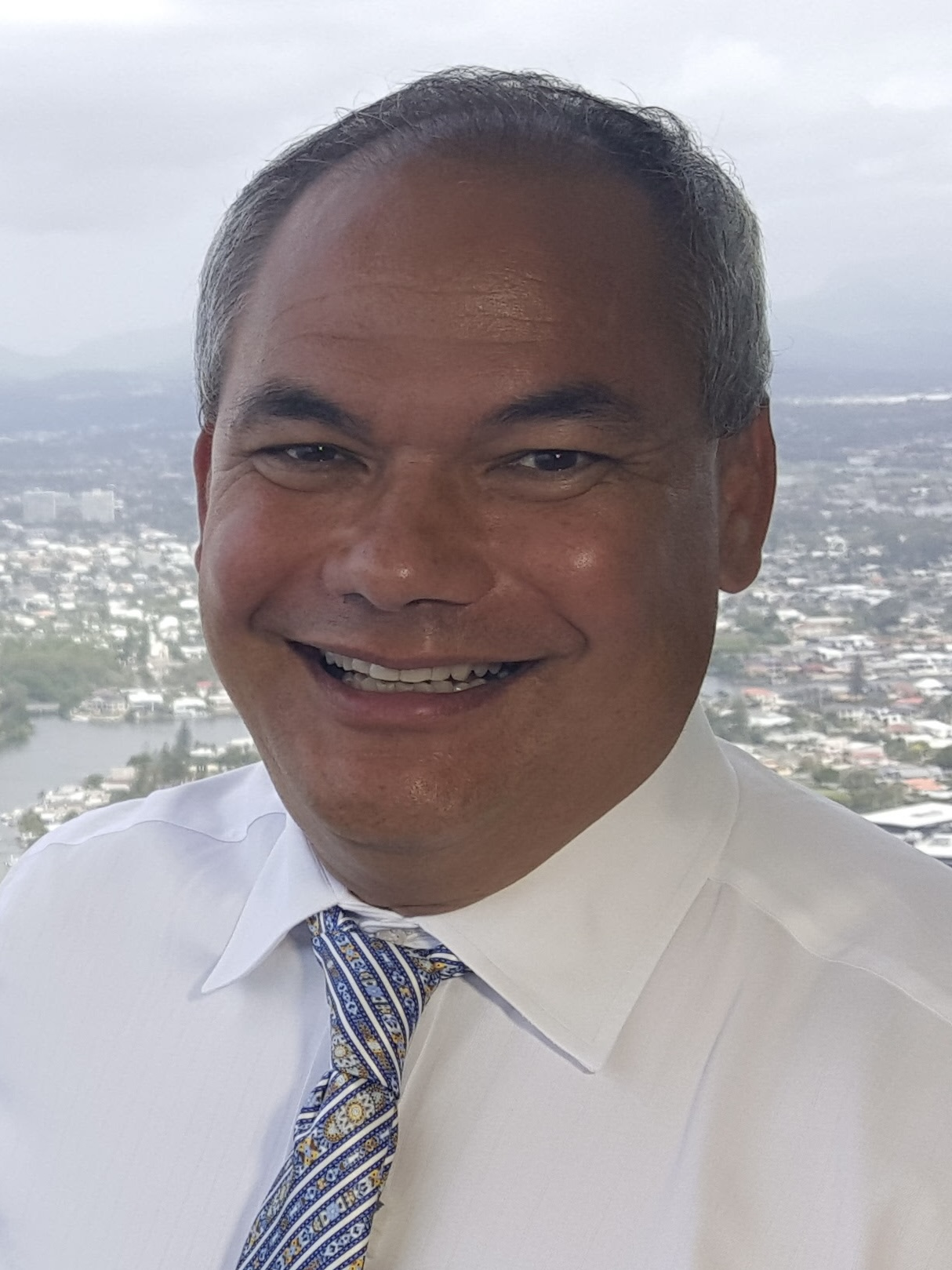

| | First party | Second party | Third party |
|---|---|---|---|
| Candidate | Ron Clarke | Tom Tate | Rob Molhoek |
| Party | Independent | Liberal | Unite GC |
| Primary vote | 79,463 | 59,585 | 57,605 |
| Percentage | 35.62% | 26.71% | 25.82% |
| Swing | | ▲26.71 | ▲25.82 |
| 2CP | 53.99% | 46.01% |
Mayor before election
Ron Clarke
Independent
Subsequent Mayor
Ron Clarke
Independent

The 2008 Gold Coast City Council election was held on 15 March 2008 to elect a mayor and 14 councillors to the City of Gold Coast. The election was held as part of the statewide local elections in Queensland, Australia.

Although there was speculation he would retire, incumbent mayor Ron Clarke contested and was re-elected, defeating four candidates − including Tom Tate (Liberal), sitting councillor Rob Molhoek (Unite GC) and former federal MP John Bradford.

== Results ==
=== Mayor ===
2008 Queensland mayoral elections: Gold Coast
| Party | Candidate | Votes | % | ±% |
|---|---|---|---|---|
| Independent | Ron Clarke | 79,463 | 35.62 | |
| Liberal | Tom Tate | 59,585 | 26.71 | +26.71 |
| Unite GC | Rob Molhoek | 57,605 | 25.82 | +25.82 |
| Independent | John Bradford | 20,754 | 9.30 | |
| Independent | Ray Schearer | 5,704 | 2.56 | |
| Total formal votes | | 223,111 | 95.71 | |
| Informal votes | | 10,005 | 4.29 | |
| Turnout | | 233,116 | | |
Two-candidate-preferred result
| Independent | Ron Clarke | 90,418 | 53.99 | |
| Liberal | Tom Tate | 77,039 | 46.01 | +46.01 |
| Independent hold | | Swing | | |

== See also ==
- 2008 Queensland local elections
- 2008 Brisbane City Council election
- 2008 Townsville City Council election
