= Goowarra, Queensland =

Goowarra
- Suburb
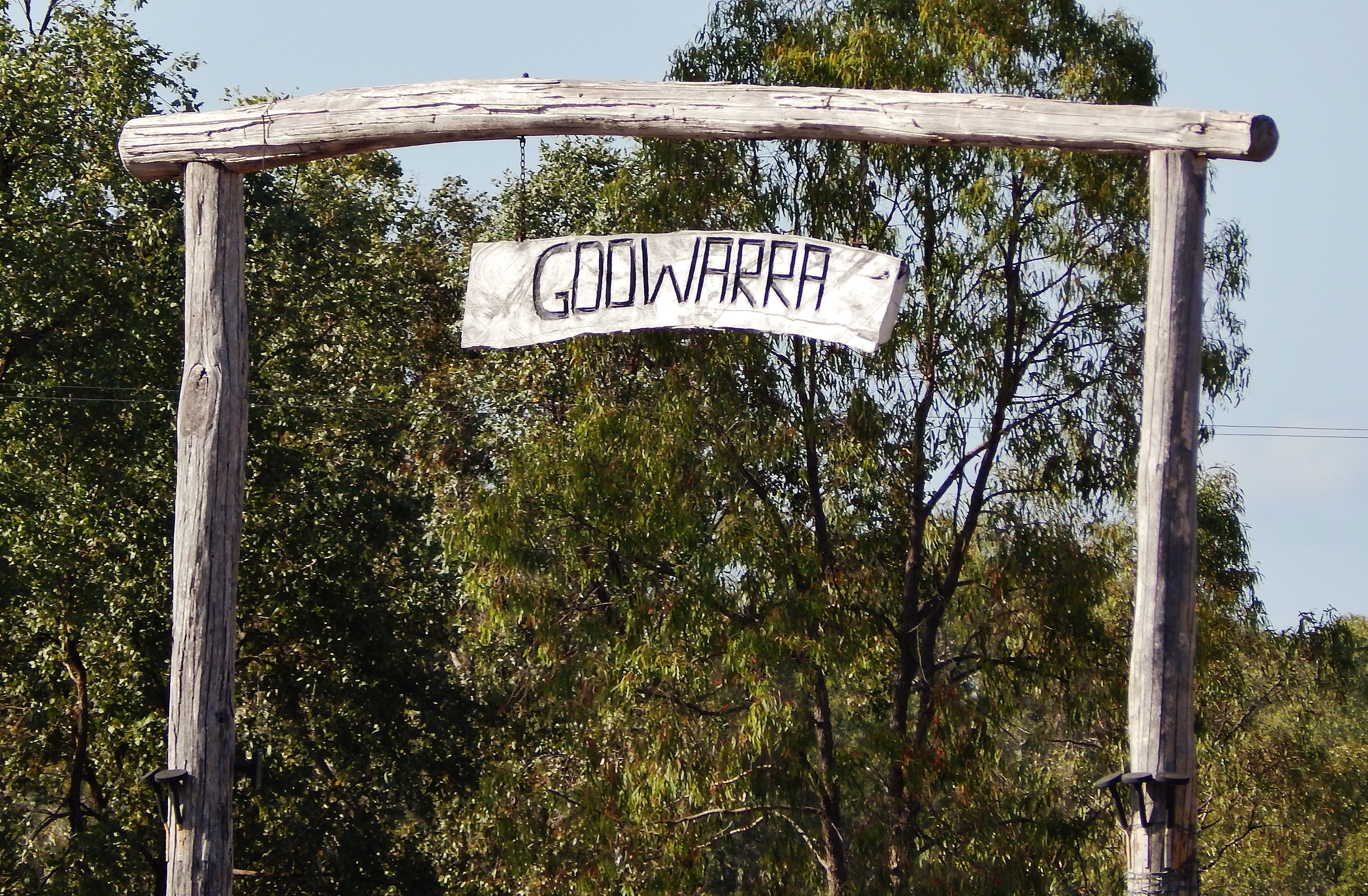
- Sign at Goowarra, 2017

- Interactive map of Goowarra
- Coordinates: 23.5472°S 149.4880°E
- Country: Australia
- State: Queensland
- LGA: Central Highlands Region
- Location: 8.3 km (5.2 mi) E of Dingo; 56.4 km (35.0 mi) E of Blackwater; 131 km (81 mi) E of Emerald; 140 km (87 mi) WSW of Rockhampton; 743 km (462 mi) NNW of Brisbane

Government
  - State electorate: Gregory
  - Federal division: Flynn

Area
  - Total: 412.9 km^{2} (159.4 sq mi)

Population
  - Total: 27 (2021 census)
  - Density: 0.0654/km^{2} (0.1694/sq mi)
- Time zone: UTC+10:00 (AEST)
- Postcode: 4702
Suburbs around Goowarra
Mackenzie	Balcomba	Balcomba
Dingo	Goowarra	Duaringa
Dingo	Wallaroo	Wallaroo

Goowarra is a rural locality in the Central Highlands Region, Queensland, Australia. In the 2021 census, Goowarra had a population of 27 people.

== Geography ==
The Capricorn Highway passes through the locality from the south-east (Wallaroo) to the south-west (Dingo). The Central Western railway line also passes through the locality to the immediate north of the highway, with the locality being served once being served by the now-abandoned Goowarra railway station (23.6598°S 149.4105°E).

The predominant land use is grazing on native vegetation.

== History ==
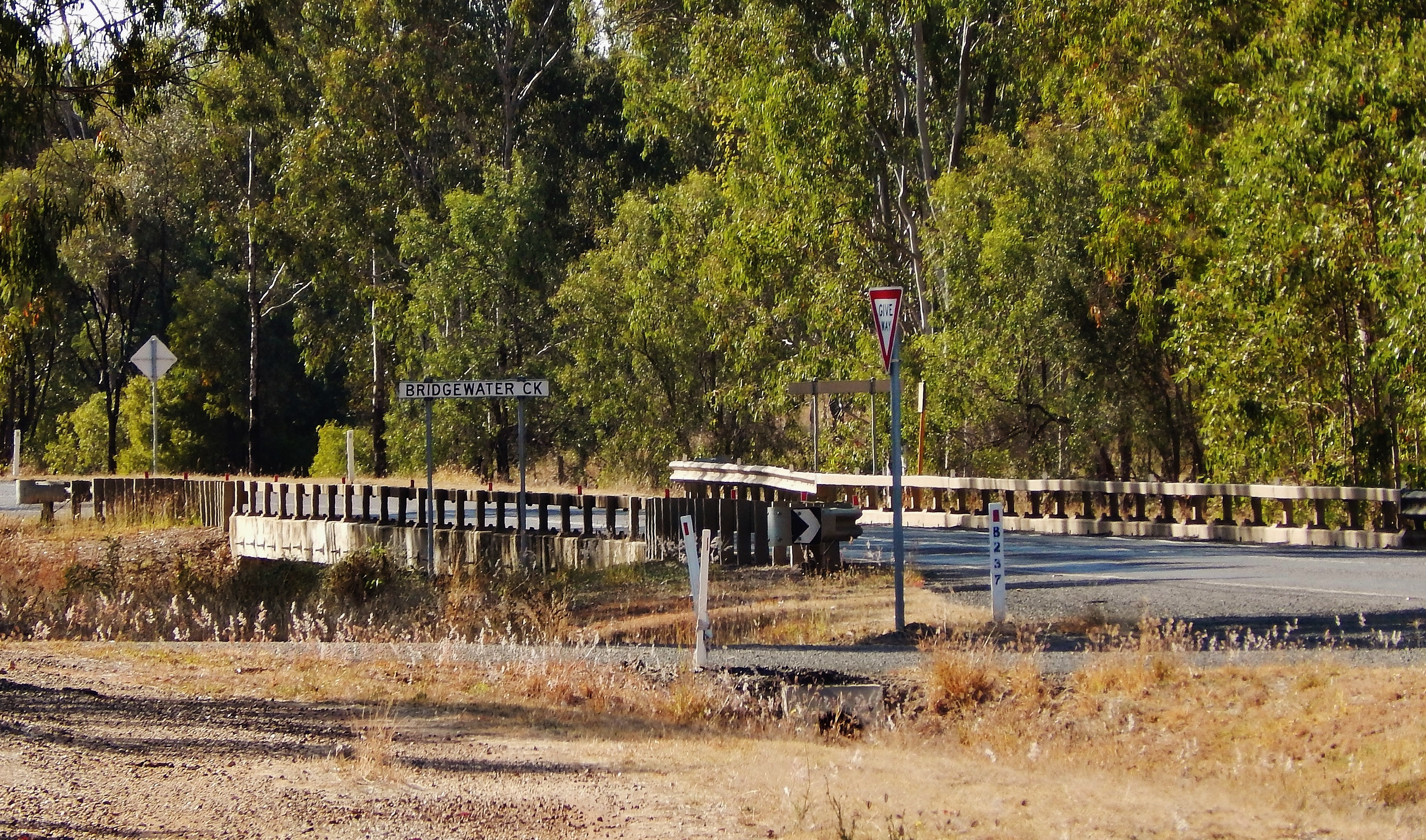
Bridgewater Creek bridge on the Capricorn Highway at Goowarra, 2017

Bridgewater Provisional School opened in 1900. In 1901, it was renamed Goowarra Provisional School. On 1 January 1909, it became Goowarra State School. It had a number of temporary closures due to low student numbers before closing permanently in 1924.

Mourindilla Provisional School opened in 1921 but closed circa 1924. Mourindilla is a pastoral property in the north of the locality (23.4065°S 149.5132°E).

== Demographics ==
In the 2016 census, Goowarra had a population of 19 people.

In the 2021 census, Goowarra had a population of 27 people.

== Education ==
There are no schools in Goowarra. The nearest government primary school is Dingo State School in neighbouring Dingo to the west. The nearest government secondary school is Blackwater State High School in Blackwater to the west.
