= 2008 Queensland local elections =

Australian local elections

← 2004	15 March 2008	2012 →

The 2008 Queensland local elections were held on 15 March 2008 to elect the mayors and councils of the 73 local government areas in Queensland, Australia.

These were the last elections contested by the Queensland Liberal Party, as they merged with the Queensland Nationals to form the Liberal National Party of Queensland a few months later in July.

== Background ==
In April 2007, an extensive local government reform process was set up by the Beattie Government, who set up a Local Government Reform Commission to report on the State's local government areas (other than the City of Brisbane). This was in part due to the number of financially weak councils with small populations in rural areas, dating from an earlier time when industry and population had justified their creation. The Commission reported back on 27 July 2007, recommending massive amalgamations all over the State into "regional councils" centred on major towns or centres, based on a range of criteria such as economy of scale, community of interest and financial sustainability.

On 10 August 2007, the commission's amalgamation recommendations passed into law as the Local Government (Reform Implementation) Act 2007, with only a few name changes as alterations. "Local Transition Committees" (LTCs) were created for each new area, made up of councillors and staff from the original areas, with the old entities formally ceasing to exist on the day of the local elections.

== See also ==
- 2008 Queensland mayoral elections
- 2008 Brisbane City Council election
- 2008 Gold Coast City Council election
- 2008 Townsville City Council election
