= Wade Seccombe =

Australian cricketer (born 1971)

Personal information
- Full name: Wade Anthony Seccombe
- Born: 30 October 1971 (age 55); Murgon, Queensland, Australia
- Batting: Right-handed
- Role: Wicket-keeper
- Relatives: Don Seccombe (uncle)

Domestic team information
- Years: Team
- 1992/93–2004/05: Queensland
- First-class debut: 19 February 1993 Queensland v England A
- Last First-class: 20 March 2005 Queensland v New South Wales
- List A debut: 9 October 1994 Queensland v Tasmania
- Last List A: 20 February 2005 Queensland v Tasmania

Career statistics
Competition	First-class	List A
Matches	115	90
Runs scored	3559	955
Batting average	24.54	21.22
100s/50s	4/12	0/4
Top score	151	67*
Balls bowled	9	0
Wickets	0	–
Bowling average	–	–
5 wickets in innings	0	–
10 wickets in match	0	n/a
Best bowling	0/0	–
Catches/stumpings	516/21	128/26
- Source: CricketArchive, 25 September 2008

Wade Anthony Seccombe (born 30 October 1971 in Murgon, Queensland) is an Australian cricket coach and former first-class cricketer representing the state of Queensland. A wicket-keeper, Seccombe spent much of his career as second choice behind incumbent Ian Healy, replacing him largely when the latter was on international duty. He was nevertheless regarded as a keeper of substantial skill, rated a "great keeper" by Australian captain Ricky Ponting.

Seccombe made his first-class debut against a touring English team at Caloundra's Roy Henzell Oval in the season of 1992–93, claiming three catches and a stumping against the touring England A team in their first innings. With Healy on Test duties, Seccombe remained the Bulls' first-choice gloveman throughout the 1990s and into the new century. He played in the Sheffield Shield final of 1994–95, in which Queensland claimed the trophy for the first time since the team's entry into the national competition in 1926. He toured England in 2001 as Adam Gilchrist's deputy in the Australian cricket team, playing four first-class matches for a return of eight catches and two stumpings.

Seccombe retired from first-class cricket in September 2005, claiming he no longer had the "hunger" to compete in first-class cricket.

On 16 June 2017, Seccombe was appointed head coach of the Queensland Bulls.
