= Wallaroo, Queensland =

Wallaroo
- Suburb
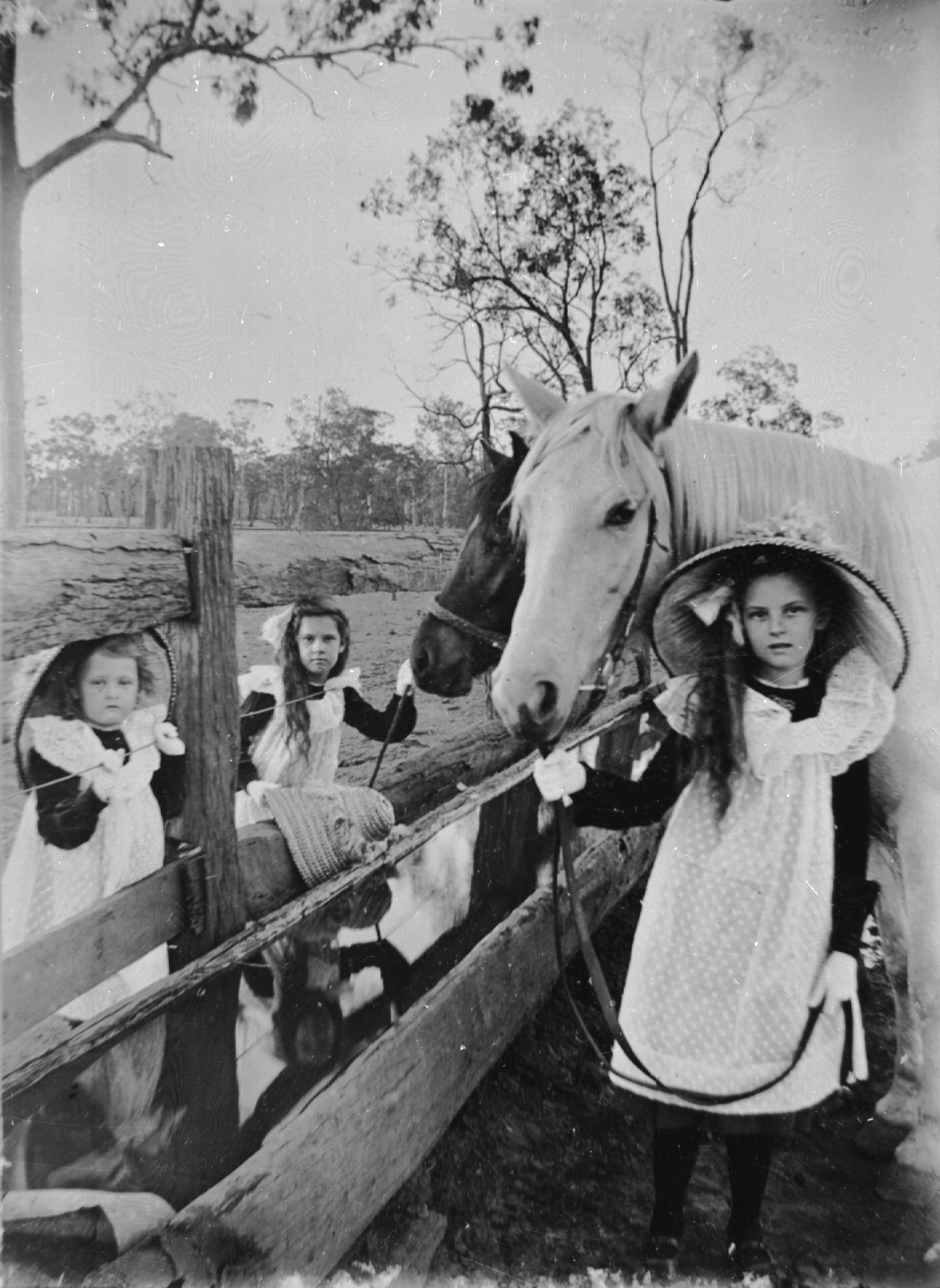
- Girls from the Steed family of Wallaroo tending their horses, circa 1902

- Interactive map of Wallaroo
- Coordinates: 23.6744°S 149.5455°E
- Country: Australia
- State: Queensland
- LGAs: Central Highlands Region; Aboriginal Shire of Woorabinda
- Location: 19.3 km (12.0 mi) WSW of Duaringa; 19.6 km (12.2 mi) E of Dingo; 133 km (83 mi) WSW of Rockhampton; 142 km (88 mi) ESE of Emerald; 742 km (461 mi) NNW of Brisbane

Government
  - State electorate: Gregory
  - Federal division: Flynn

Area
  - Total: 241.1 km^{2} (93.1 sq mi)

Population
  - Total: 0 (2021 census)
  - Density: 0.0000/km^{2} (0.000/sq mi)
- Time zone: UTC+10:00 (AEST)
- Postcode: 4702
Suburbs around Wallaroo
Goowarra	Goowarra	Duaringa
Goowarra	Wallaroo	Duaringa
Dingo	Coomoo	Duaringa

Wallaroo is a rural locality split between the Central Highlands Region and the Aboriginal Shire of Woorabinda, Queensland, Australia. In the 2021 census, Wallaroo had "no people or a very low population".

== Geography ==
The part within the Aboriginal Shire of Woorabinda is in the north of the locality (23.5430°S 149.5141°E) and is smaller at 12.5 square kilometres (4.8 sq mi), while the part within Central Highlands Region is in the south of the locality (23.6744°S 149.5455°E) and is larger at 228.6 square kilometres (88.3 sq mi).

The Capricorn Highway enters the locality from the south-east (Duaringa) and exits to the west (Goowarra). The Blackwater railway system (based on the former Central Western railway line) runs to the north of the highway with the locality being serviced by:

- Wallaroo railway station in the south-east of the locality (23.70578°S 149.56816°E)
- Tryphinia railway station on the western boundary of the locality (23.66500°S 149.44245°E)

The Duaringa State Forest occupies the east of the locality and some parts of the south and west of the locality. Apart from this protected area, the land use is grazing on native vegetation.

== History ==
Wallaroo Provisional School opened circa 1898. It closed in 1909.

== Demographics ==
In the 2016 census, Wallaroo had a population of 10 people.

In the 2021 census, Wallaroo had "no people or a very low population".

== Education ==
There are no schools in Wallaroo. The nearest government primary schools are Duaringa State School in neighbouring Duaringa to the east and Dingo State School in Dingo to the west. There are no nearby secondary schools; the nearest is Blackwater State High School in Blackwater to the west, but it is sufficiently distant that the alternatives are distance education and boarding school.
