= Dingo, Queensland =

Dingo
- Town
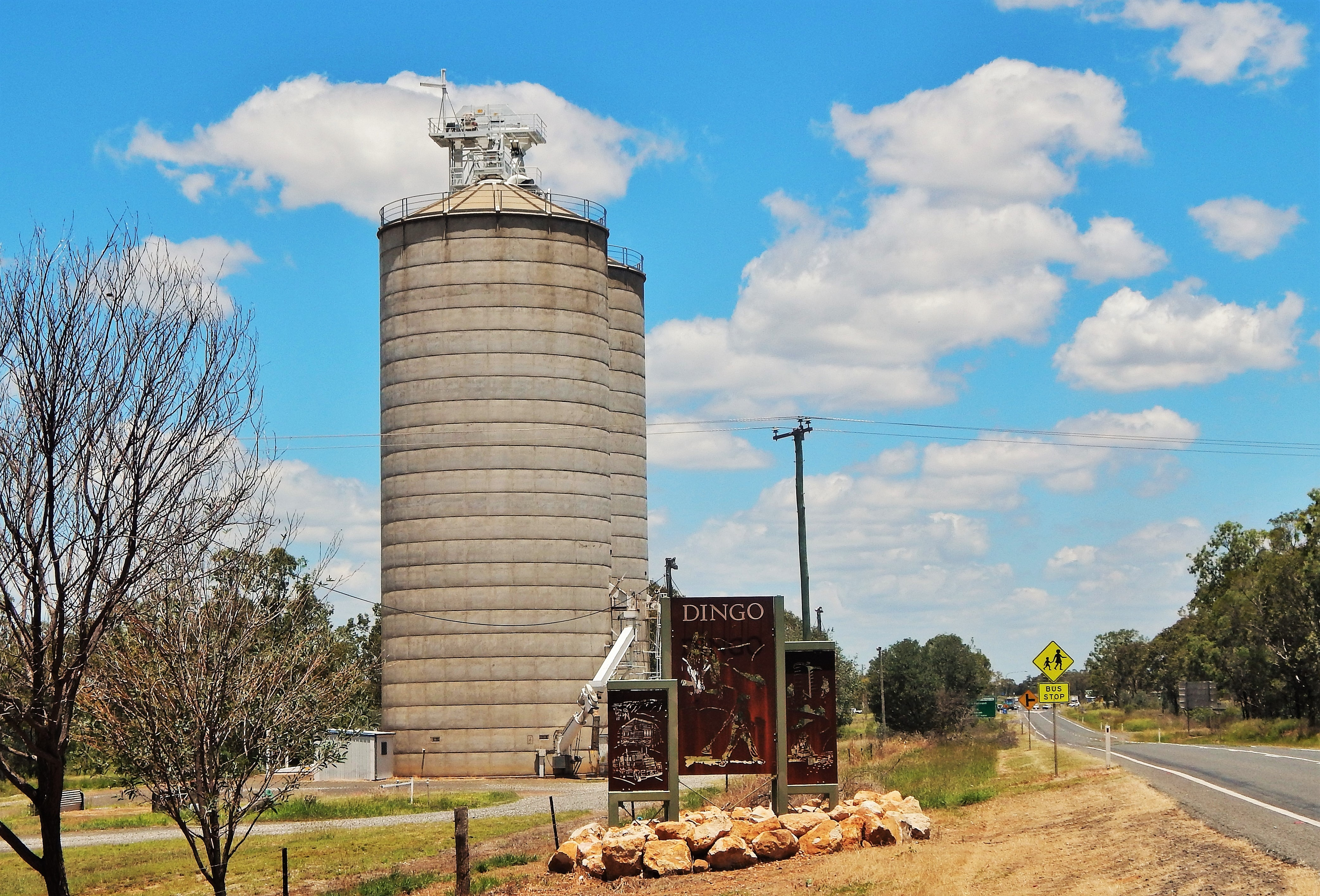
- Grain silos at Dingo, 2017

- Interactive map of Dingo
- Coordinates: 23.645°S 149.3313°E
- Country: Australia
- State: Queensland
- LGA: Central Highlands Region
- Location: 49.7 km (30.9 mi) E of Blackwater; 124 km (77 mi) E of Emerald; 148 km (92 mi) WSW of Rockhampton; 759 km (472 mi) NW of Brisbane

Government
  - State electorate: Gregory
  - Federal division: Flynn

Area
  - Total: 1,616.2 km^{2} (624.0 sq mi)

Population
  - Total: 221 (2021 census)
  - Density: 0.13674/km^{2} (0.3542/sq mi)
- Time zone: UTC+10:00 (AEST)
- Postcode: 4702
Localities around Dingo
Jellinbah	Alsace	Mackenzie
Bluff	Dingo	Goowarra
Stewarton; Blackdown	Wooroona	Wallaroo; Coomoo

Dingo is a rural town and locality in the Central Highlands Region, Queensland, Australia. In the 2021 census, the locality of Dingo had a population of 221 people.

== Geography ==
The town is on the Capricorn Highway, 759 kilometres (472 mi) by road north-west of the state capital Brisbane and 148 kilometres (92 mi) by road west of the regional centre of Rockhampton. The Fitzroy Developmental Road runs north-west from the Capricorn Highway.

The Central Western railway line passes through the locality with two stations (from west to east):

- Umolo railway station (23.6268°S 149.2667°E)
- Dingo railway station, serving the town (23.6472°S 149.3307°E)

== History ==
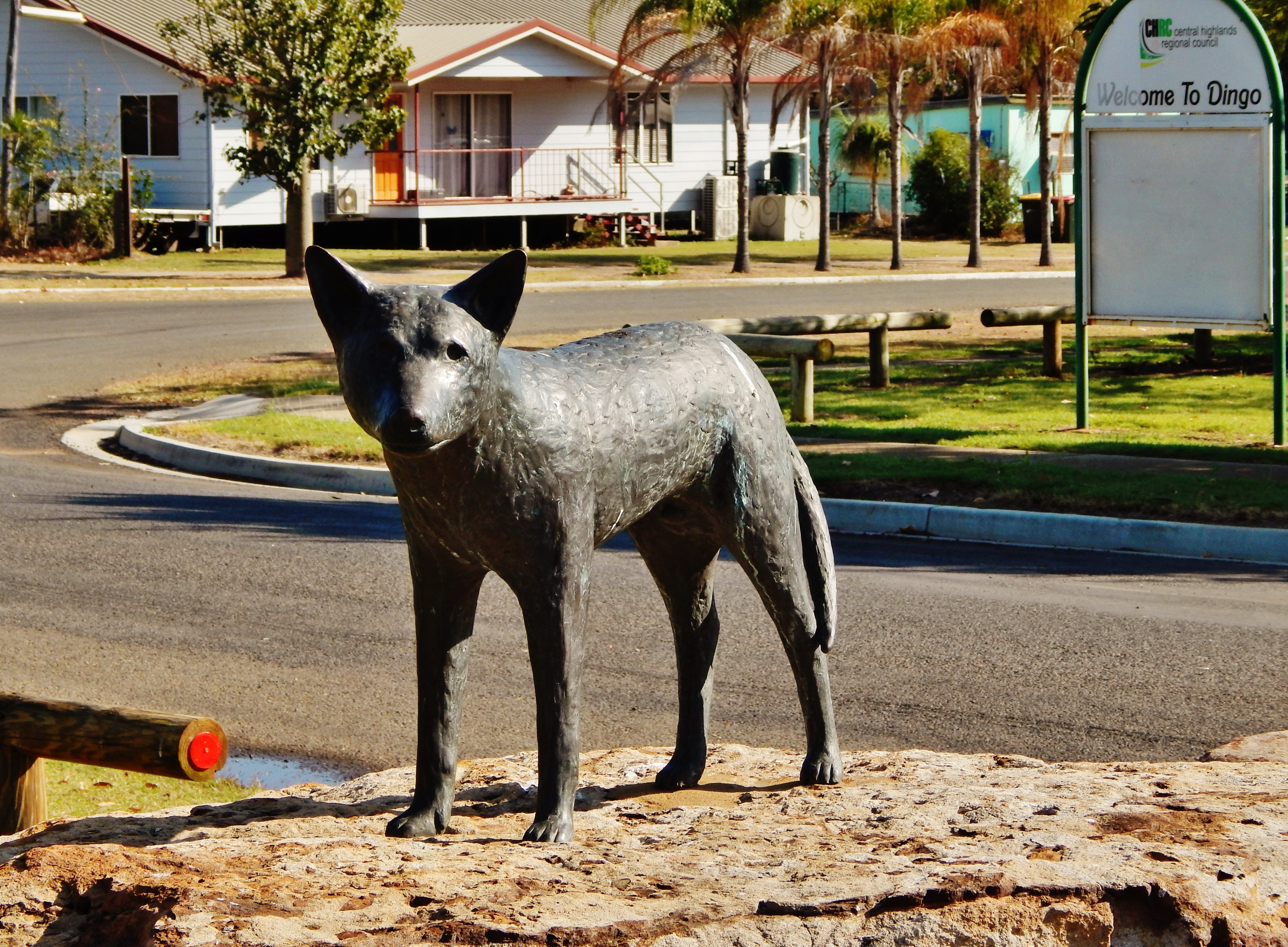
A bronze sculpture of a dingo located in the township of Dingo, 2017

The town was surveyed in 1889 and took its name from the nearby Dingo Creek. For a time in 1940 the town was known as Remo. Dingo Post Office opened on 1 October 1876.

Dingo Provisional School opened on 29 May 1876. On 22 January 1877 it became Dingo State School.

In 1973, a population of Bridled nail-tail wallabies (Onychogalea fraenata) was found in the Dingo area by a fencing contractor. Not having been seen since 1937, the species had been considered extinct. The area where the wallabies was rediscovered was protected as Taunton National Park.

On 31 January 1997, Duaringa Shire mayor Tom Hall unveiled a bronze sculpture of a dingo in Normanby Street opposite the library (23.6473°S 149.3325°E). It was created by Gaye Porter. A plaque attached below the statue explains how pioneer Moses Wafer named the area after hearing dingos howling during the night while camped near the present-day site of the town.

== Demographics ==
In the 2006 census, the locality of Dingo had a population of 263 people.

In the 2011 census, the locality of Dingo had a population of 342 people.

In the 2016 census, the locality of Dingo had a population of 340 people.

In the 2021 census, the locality of Dingo had a population of 221 people.

== Education ==
Dingo State School is a government primary (Early Childhood-6) school for boys and girls on the corner of Kennedy and Normanby Streets (23.6455°S 149.3302°E). In 2018, the school had an enrolment of 47 students with 5 teachers (4 full-time equivalent) and 6 non-teaching staff (4 full-time equivalent).

There are no secondary schools in Dingo. The nearest government secondary school is Blackwater State High School in Blackwater to the west, but it would be too distant for students in the eastern parts of Dingo. The alternatives are distance education and boarding school.

== Amenities ==
The Central Highlands Regional Council operates a public library at 10 Normanby Street (23.6471°S 149.3326°E).

== Events ==
In August each year, the Dingo Race Club holds the annual Dingo Race Day and World Dingo Trap Throwing Competition at Bauman Park (23.6509°S 149.3458°E). The event was attended by 2000 people in 2019 when it celebrated its 30th anniversary. This figure grew to 4,000 when the event returned in 2021 after being cancelled in 2020 due to the COVID-19 pandemic.

== Notable residents ==
Australian rugby league player Ben Hunt grew up in Dingo.
