= Wadjigu people =

Aboriginal Australian people

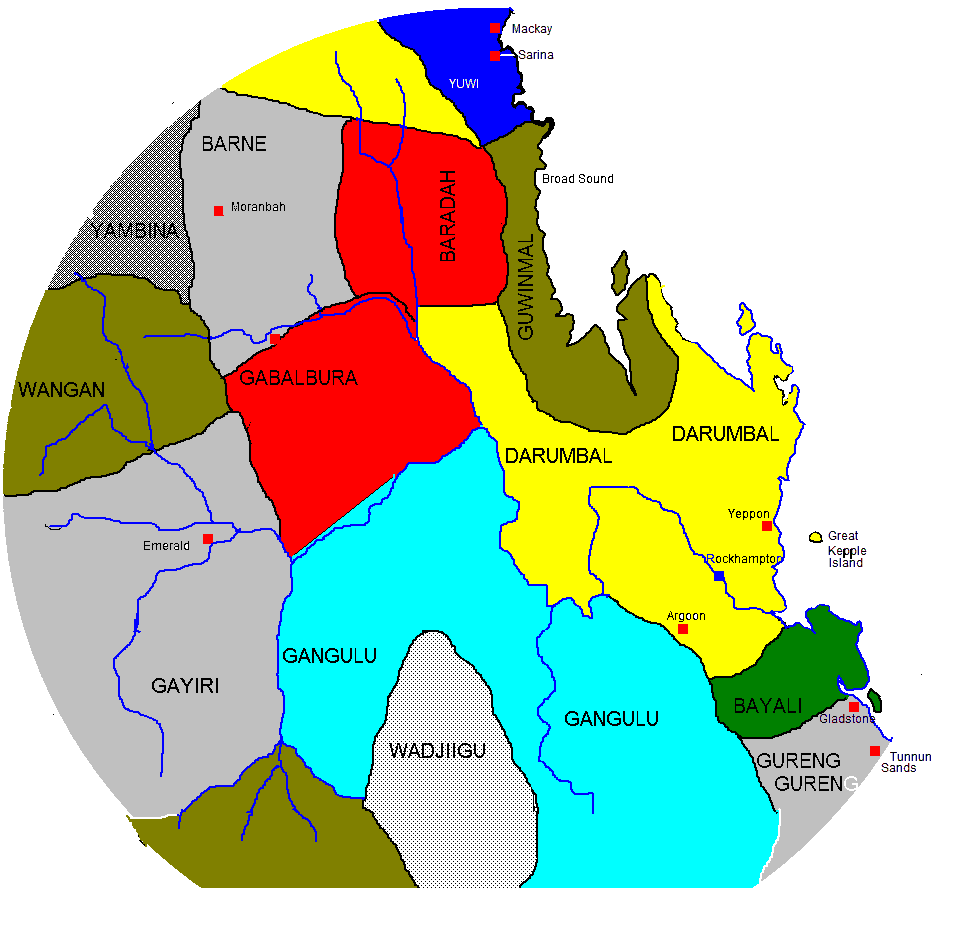
Aboriginal peoples of central-Eastern Queensland

The Wadjiga people, also known as Wadja, Maudalgo, Wadjainggo, and other variants, were an Aboriginal Australian people of inland eastern Queensland.

== Country ==
Wadja tribal lands covered some 8,500 square kilometres (3,300 sq mi) along the streams flowing along the eastern side of the Expedition Range. Their southern boundaries reached as far as Bigge Range. To the east they ran to the vicinity of the Dawson River. They were the Indigenous inhabitants of Woorabinda.

== History ==
According to traditional lore, the Wadjiga arose from a confluence of two distinct tribes, namely the Wainjigo and the Wadja. Long cohabitation over the same tribal grounds led to the effective amalgamation of their separate identities and customs. Norman Tindale

== Language ==
The Wajigu language is a dialect of the Bidjara language group.

== Alternative names ==
- Wainjago, Wainjigo
- Wadjainggo
- Wainggo
- Wadju, Maudalgo, Wadjainggo, Waindjago, Wainggo, Wainjago, Wainjigo, Wadya

== Sources ==
- McIntosh, Peter (1887). "Eastern slopes of Expedition Range, Lower Dawson, Upper Fitzroy, MacKenzie and Isaacs rivers, and many of their tributaries." (PDF). In Curr, Edward Micklethwaite (ed.). The Australian race: its origin, languages, customs, place of landing in Australia and the routes by which it spread itself over the continent. Vol. 3. Melbourne: J. Ferres. pp. 58–62.
- Tindale, Norman Barnett (1974). "Wadja (QLD)". Aboriginal Tribes of Australia: Their Terrain, Environmental Controls, Distribution, Limits, and Proper Names. Australian National University. ISBN 978-0-708-10741-6.
