= Stewarton, Queensland =

Stewarton
- Suburb
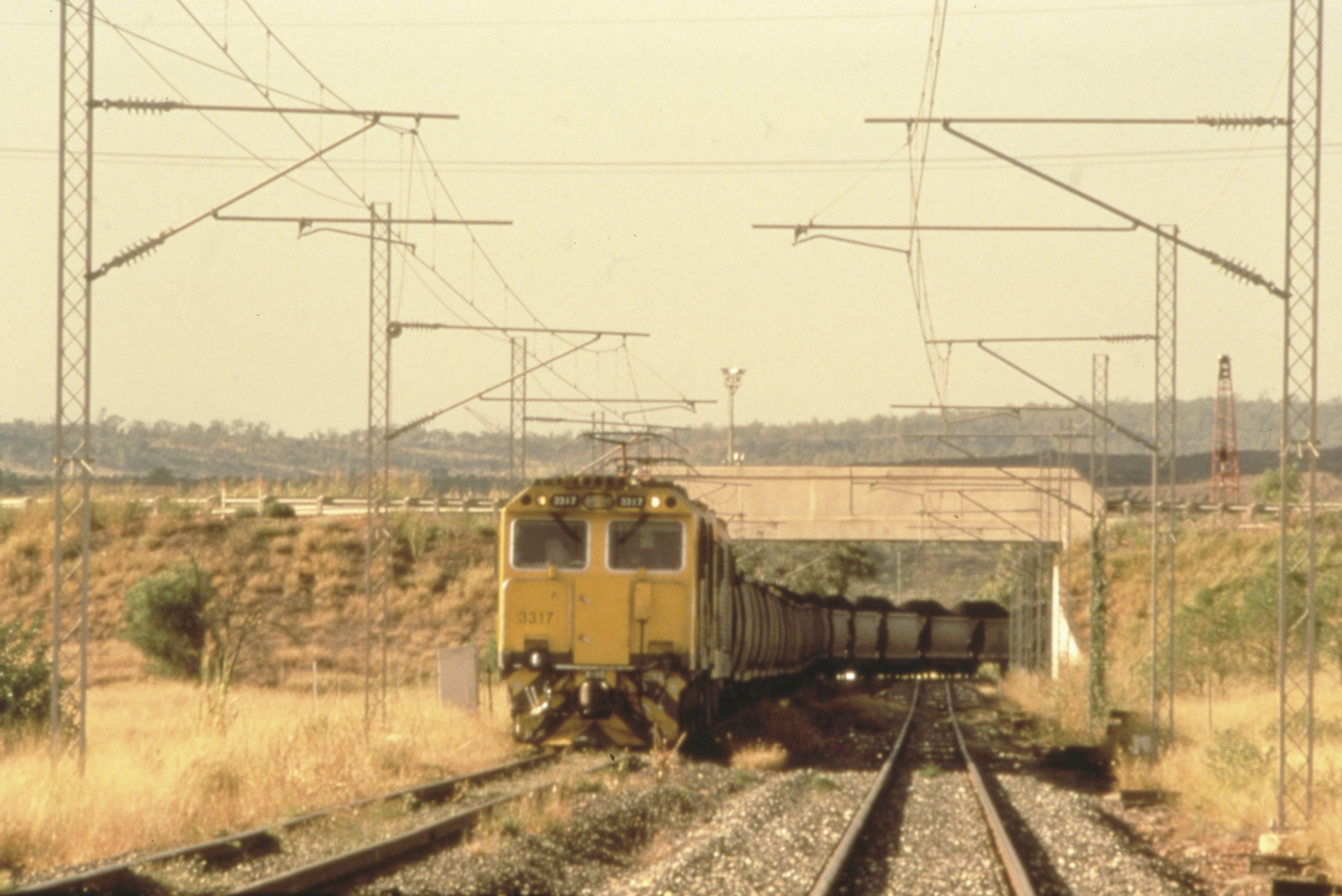
- Coal train, near Kinrola railway station, circa 1999

- Interactive map of Stewarton
- Coordinates: 23.7994°S 148.9166°E
- Country: Australia
- State: Queensland
- LGA: Central Highlands Region
- Location: 23.0 km (14.3 mi) S of Blackwater; 96.3 km (59.8 mi) ESE of Emerald; 216 km (134 mi) WSW of Rockhampton; 792 km (492 mi) NNW of Brisbane

Government
  - State electorate: Gregory
  - Federal division: Flynn

Area
  - Total: 750.4 km^{2} (289.7 sq mi)

Population
  - Total: 52 (2021 census)
  - Density: 0.0693/km^{2} (0.1795/sq mi)
- Time zone: UTC+10:00 (AEST)
- Postcode: 4702
Suburbs around Stewarton
Blackwater	Blackwater	Bluff
Comet	Stewarton	Dingo
Togara	Humboldt	Blackdown

Stewarton is a rural locality in the Central Highlands Region, Queensland, Australia. In the 2021 census, Stewarton had a population of 52 people.

== Geography ==
Two railway lines in the Blackwater railway system enters the locality from the north with the first exiting to the west and the second terminating in the centre of the locality. The locality is served by a number of railway stations. On the first line are:

- Tikardi railway station (23.6394°S 148.8082°E)
- Boorgoon Junction railway station (23.6669°S 148.7977°E)
- Boorgoon railway station (23.6828°S 148.7897°E)
- Kinrola railway station (23.7343°S 148.7937°E)

On the second line are:

- Taurus railway station (23.7029°S 148.8794°E)
- Koorilgah railway station (23.7134°S 148.8982°E)

== Demographics ==
In the 2016 census, Stewarton had a population of 39 people.

In the 2021 census, Stewarton had a population of 52 people.

== Education ==
There are no schools in Stewarton. The nearest government primary and secondary schools are Blackwater State School and Blackwater State High School, both in neighbouring Blackwater to the north.

== Facilities ==
Despite the name, Blackwater Airport is at 18837 Capricorn Highway in Stewarton (23.6033°S 148.8060°E).
