= Rhydding, Queensland =

Rhydding
- Suburb
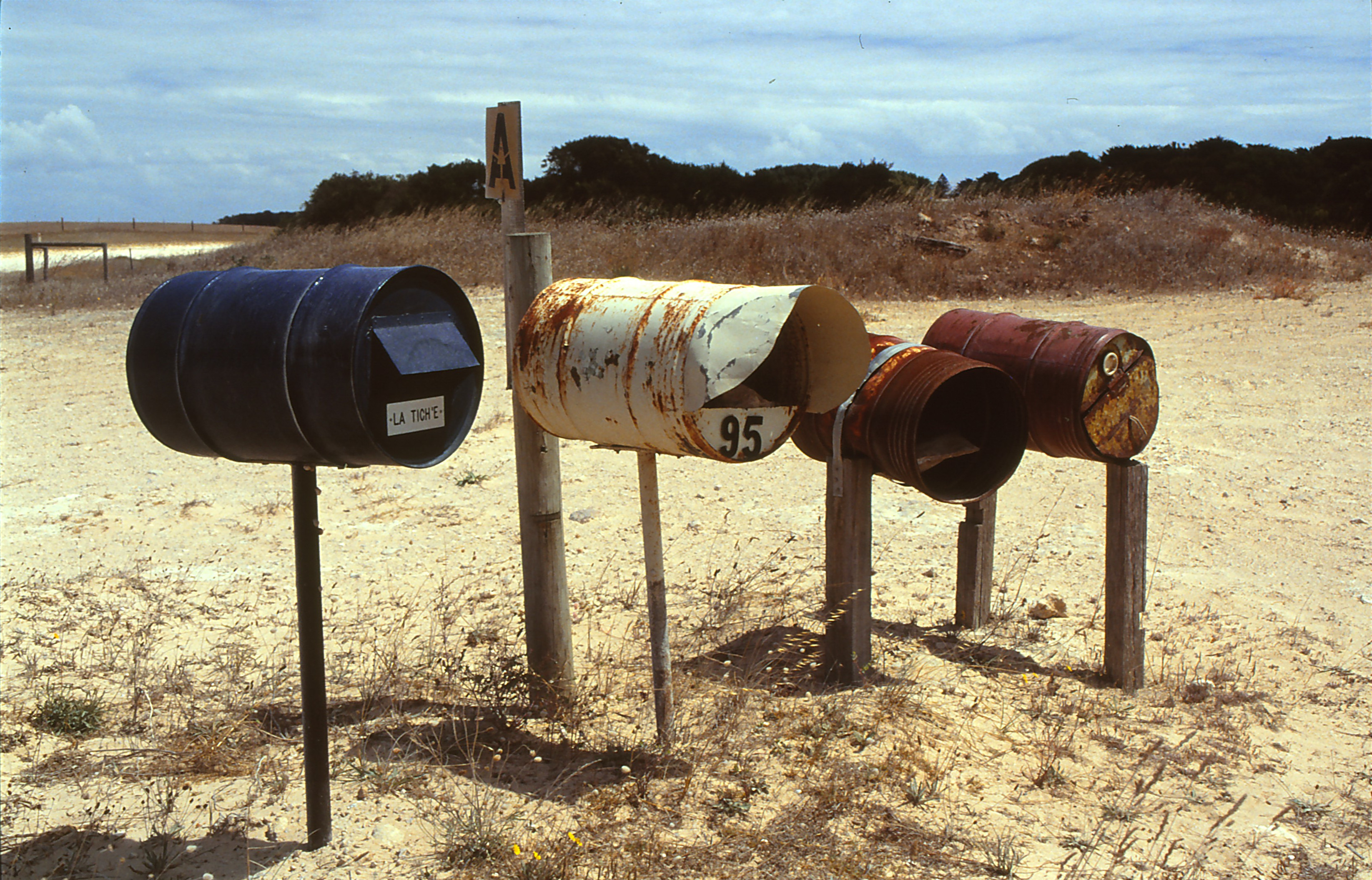
- Letterboxes for rural properties along the Dawson Highway, 1990

- Interactive map of Rhydding
- Coordinates: 24.7561°S 149.5558°E
- Country: Australia
- State: Queensland
- LGA: Central Highlands Region
- Location: 69.1 km (42.9 mi) WSW of Moura; 134 km (83 mi) WSW of Biloela; 238 km (148 mi) SW of Rockhampton; 248 km (154 mi) SE of Emerald; 585 km (364 mi) NW of Brisbane

Government
  - State electorate: Gregory
  - Federal division: Flynn

Area
  - Total: 604.5 km^{2} (233.4 sq mi)

Population
  - Total: 43 (2021 census)
  - Density: 0.0711/km^{2} (0.1842/sq mi)
- Time zone: UTC+10:00 (AEST)
- Postcode: 4718
Suburbs around Rhydding
Bauhinia	Oombabeer	Roundstone
Mungabunda	Rhydding	Roundstone
Mungabunda	Coorada	Roundstone

Rhydding is a rural locality in the Central Highlands Region, Queensland, Australia. In the 2021 census, Rhydding had a population of 43 people.

== Geography ==
The Dawson Highway forms most of the northern boundary of Rydding. The Fitzroy Developmental Road enters the locality from the south and has its junction with the Dawson Highway within the locality. A number of creeks flow from south to north through Rhydding; these are ultimately tributaries of the Dawson River, which in turn is a tributary of the Fitzroy River, which flows into the Coral Sea near Port Alma.

Rhydding is a mixture of freehold and leased land. The land use is grazing on native vegetation.

== History ==
As the locality is within the parish of Rhydding, presumably it takes its name from the parish.

== Demographics ==
In the 2016 census, Rhydding had a population of 63 people.

In the 2021 census, Rhydding had a population of 43 people.

== Education ==
There are no schools in Rhydding. The nearest government primary schools are Bauhinia State School in neighbouring Bauhinia to the north-west and Moura State School in Moura to the north-east. However, students living in the south-eastern part of Rhydding may be too distant to attend either of these schools; the alternatives are distance education and boarding school.

The nearest government secondary school is Moura State High School in Moura, but students living in the south and west of Rydding may be too distant to attend this school; the alternatives are distance education and boarding school.
