= Woorabinda, Queensland =

Woorabinda
- Town
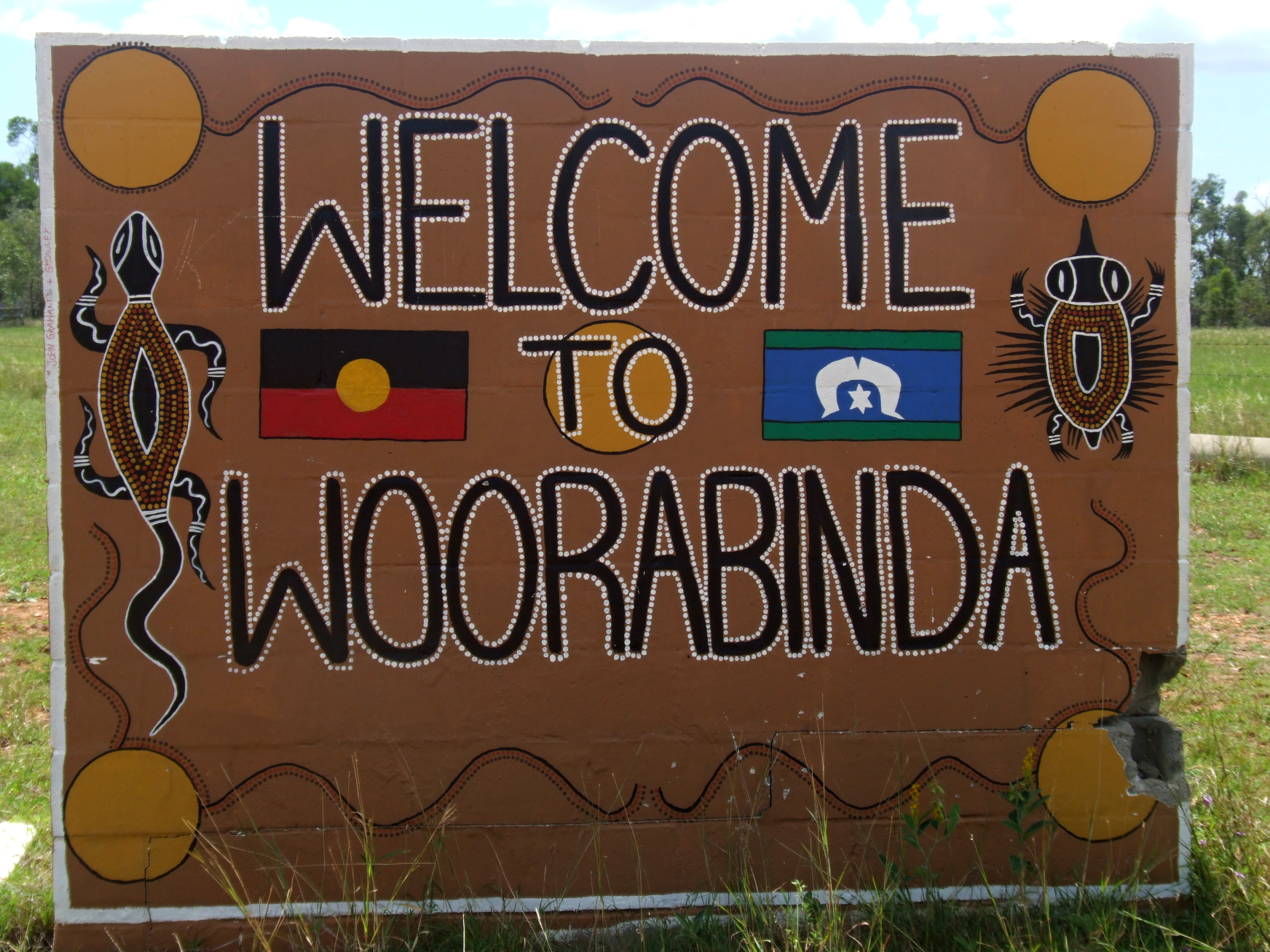

- Interactive map of Woorabinda
- Coordinates: 24.1288°S 149.4580°E
- Country: Australia
- State: Queensland
- Region: Central Queensland
- LGA: Aboriginal Shire of Woorabinda
- Location: 40.4 km (25.1 mi) W of Baralaba; 170 km (110 mi) SW of Rockhampton; 697 km (433 mi) NW of Brisbane
- Established: 1927

Government
  - State electorate: Gregory
  - Federal division: Flynn

Area
  - Total: 220.1 km^{2} (85.0 sq mi)

Population
  - Total: 1,019 (2021 census)
  - Density: 4.630/km^{2} (11.991/sq mi)
- Time zone: UTC+10:00 (AEST)
- Postcode: 4713
Localities around Woorabinda
Wooroona	Wooroona	Coomoo
Wooroona	Woorabinda	Mimosa
Goomally	Goomally	Mimosa

Woorabinda /ˈwʊrəbɪndə/ is a rural town and locality in the Aboriginal Shire of Woorabinda, Queensland, Australia. It is an Aboriginal community. In the 2021 census, the locality of Woorabinda had a population of 1,019 people with 91.6% identifying as Aboriginal or Torres Strait Islander.

== Geography ==
Woorabinda is in Central Queensland, inland about two hours' drive west of Rockhampton.

The seasonal Mimosa Creek is nearby and is a source of local water. During rainy season, the town can be isolated due to road flooding.

Access is via the Fitzroy Developmental Road, which is sealed north towards Duaringa and where it meets the Capricorn Highway to Rockhampton. To the south, it is gravel road to Bauhinia, where it meets the Dawson Highway and access to Gladstone.

East is the sealed Baralaba-Woorabinda Road, seasonally cut off by flooding. West has a number of cattle properties until the base of the Blackdown Tablelands, serviced by gravel roads.

There is also a sealed airstrip along the north road into town (24.1141°S 149.4765°E). It is used by chartered flights and aeromedical retrieval services. No commercial flights operate to the airstrip.

== History ==
Wadja (also known as Wadjigu, Wadya, Wadjainngo, Mandalgu, and Wadjigun) is an Australian Aboriginal language in Central Queensland. The language region includes the local government areas of the Aboriginal Shire of Woorabinda and Central Highlands Region, including the Blackdown Tablelands. the Comet River, and the Expedition Range, and the towns of Woorabinda, Springsure and Rolleston.

The town's name was chosen by Herbert Cecil Colledge, the superintendent of the settlement in 1927 using Aboriginal words, woora meaning kangaroo and binda meaning camp.

In 1926, the Queensland Government order hundreds of Aboriginal families to relocate to Woorabinda. The movement of approximately 300 Taroom residents to Woorabinda occurred most via foot over a distance of over 200 kilometres (120 mi). This walk from Taroom to Woorabinda was commemorated by the community with a supported re-enactment in 2014.

Woorabinda State School opened in 1928, closed in 1970 and subsequently reopened.

The Woorabinda community is the only DOGIT Aboriginal community within the Central Queensland region. DOGIT communities have a special type of land tenure which applies only to former Aboriginal reserves. The land title is a system of community level land trusts, owned and administered by the local council.

Wadja Wadja High School opened on 24 January 1984.

== Demographics ==
In the 2006 census, the town of Woorabinda had a population of 851 people with 94.6% identifying as Aboriginal or Torres Strait Islander.

In the 2016 census, the locality of Woorabinda had a population of 962 people with 94.7% identifying as Aboriginal or Torres Strait Islander.

In the 2021 census, the locality of Woorabinda had a population of 1,019 people with 91.6% identifying as Aboriginal or Torres Strait Islander.

== Economy ==
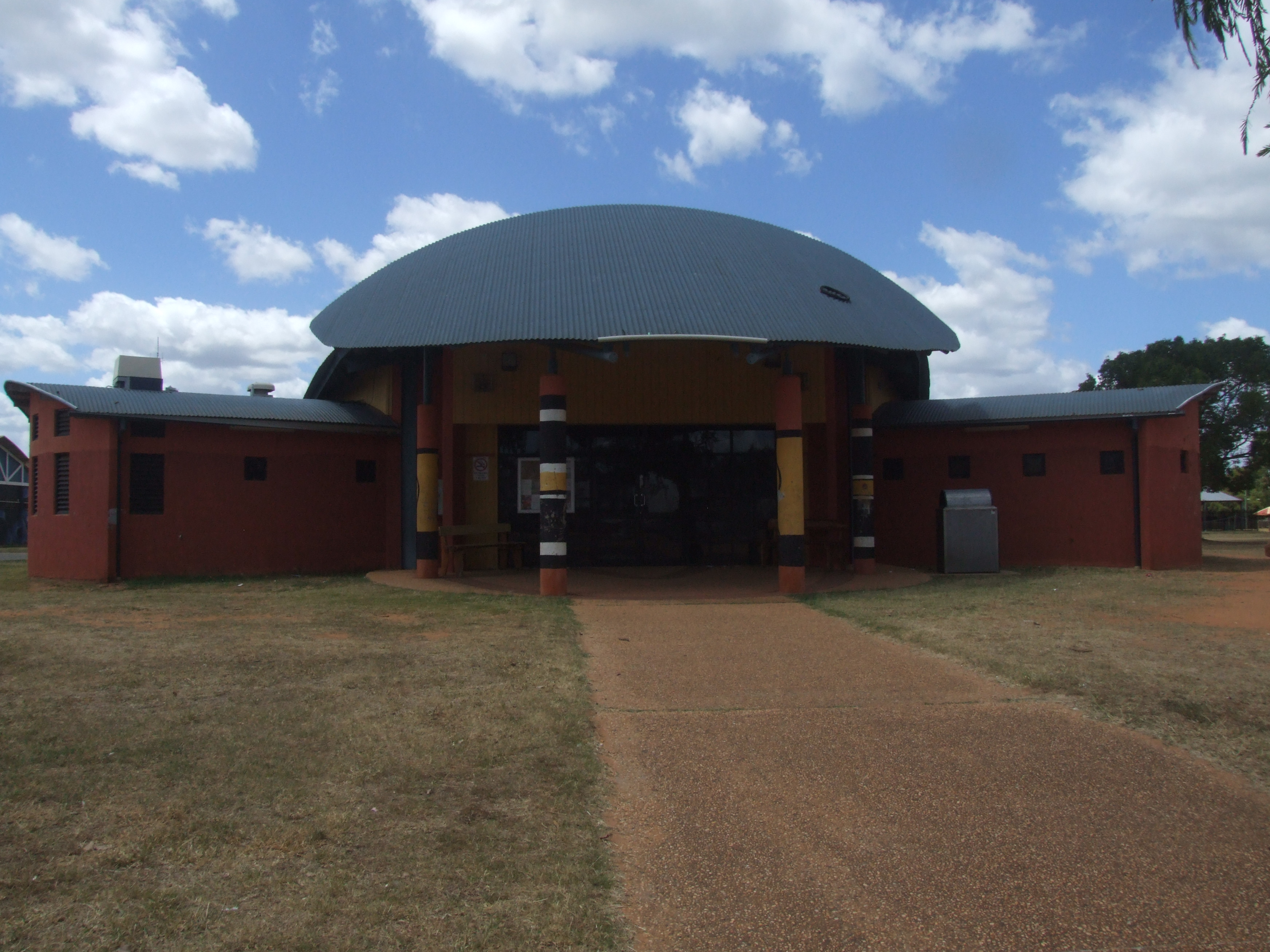
Council building.

In 2013, unemployment in Woorabinda was at 70%; whereas the nearby mining town of Taroom had unemployment rate of 0.7%. In 2014, Woorabinda was identified as amongst Queensland's most disadvantaged suburbs, the other five disadvantaged suburbs were also Indigenous townships.

Government service providers are the main source of employment, with local industry in the form of the takeaway cafe and Woorabinda Pastoral Company, owned by the council. The satellite Foleyvale Station is just north of Duaringa, and is included in the Woorabinda lands used pastorally.

== Alcohol Management Plan ==
In 2008, the community and council voted for the total ban of alcohol consumption within the town limits to become a "dry" community. The town has had a significant decrease in alcohol-fuelled violence since the Alcohol Management Plan was introduced.

As of 2013, there has been ongoing movement within the community for a reintroduction of alcohol, with a community-led vote majority for its reintroduction. This has been as part of a larger movement within Aboriginal communities of Queensland for Alcohol Management Plan reviews.

The town also hosts the Mimosa Creek Healing Centre, which is a detoxification and rehabilitation centre for men recovering from alcohol abuse.

== Education ==
Woorabinda State School is a government primary (Prep–6) school for boys and girls at Carbine Street (24.1365°S 149.4561°E). In 2017, the school had an enrolment of 144 students with 16 teachers and 19 non-teaching staff (13 full-time equivalent). It includes a special education program. The school motto is 'Proud and Deadly'. There is a school tuck shop which runs a paid canteen from which meals can be purchased by the community. Part of the school includes the Community Indigenous Knowledge Centre, an initiative of the State Library of Queensland, which is for access by the community.

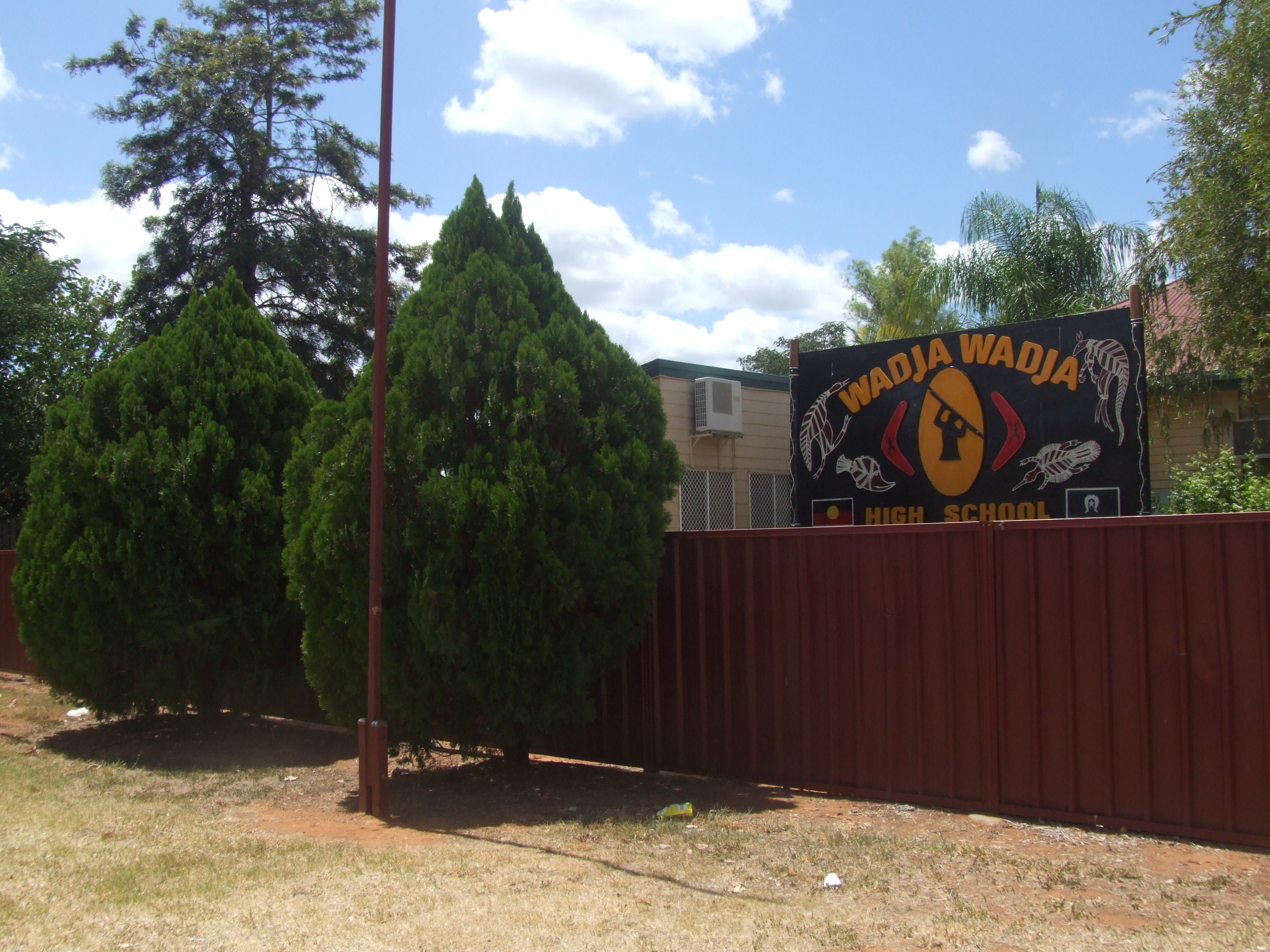
Wadja Wadja High School, Munns Dr.

Wadja Wadja High School is a private secondary (7–12) school for boys and girls at 116 Munns Drive (24.1332°S 149.4560°E). It is operated by the Wadja Wadja Aboriginal Corporation of Education. In 2017, the school had an enrolment of 77 students with 4 teachers and 12 non-teaching staff (9 full-time equivalent). In 2020, there were 76 students attending the school, all of whom were Indigenous.

There is no government secondary school in Woorabinda. The nearest government secondary school is Baralaba State School (to Year 10) in Baralaba to the east; there is a school bus service. There are no nearby secondary schools offering schooling to Year 12; alternatives are distance education or boarding school.

== Amenities ==
Woorabinda has an Indigenous Knowledge Centre (library) operated by the Woorabinda Aboriginal Shire Council.

One Mob Fellowship is on Munns Drive (approx 24.1335°S 149.4555°E). It is part of the Wesleyan Methodist Church.

== Demographics ==
The two main groups of people in Woorabinda are the Gangulu Nation and the Wadja Nation, both of whom have native title claims to the land. The area claimed for the Wadja people is limited to the Woorabinda current land geography; the Gangulu nation expands as far south as Theodore, west past Blackwater, and east to Mount Morgan.

In 2008, there was a much higher proportion of people under the age of 18 in Woorabinda than in the wider non-indigenous community. Half of the population is under the age of 25, which is significantly higher than the Australian 0–24 years age group, which is one third of the population.

In the 2016 census, the locality of Woorabinda had a population of 962 people.

In the 2021 census, the locality of Woorabinda had a population of 1,019 people.

== Music and dance ==
In 2017, the Kulgoodah dancers from Woorabinda won the Dance Rites competition, which had been founded by Rhoda Roberts. Roberts credits dance and music with having turned around the youth in the community, helping to give especially the young men "visibility and a sense of purpose". The singer-songwriter Miiesha emerged from this dance group, and in 2020 won the Best New Talent at the National Indigenous Music Awards.

== Notable people ==
- Miiesha, ARIA Music Award-winning singer
- Reggie Cressbrook, North Queensland Cowboys NRL player
- Mick Gooda, Aboriginal activist, Australian Human Rights Commission's Aboriginal and Torres Strait Islander Social Justice Commissioner
