= 2012 Queensland mayoral elections =

Australian mayoral election

← 2008	28 April 2012	2016 →

The 2012 Queensland mayoral elections were held on 28 April 2012 to elect the mayors of the 77 local government areas in Queensland, Australia. The elections were held as part of the statewide local elections.

== Results ==
=== Brisbane ===
2012 Queensland mayoral elections: Brisbane
Party	Candidate	Votes	%	±%
Liberal National	Graham Quirk	333,637	61.94	+1.87
Labor	Ray Smith	135,534	25.16	−3.85
Greens	Andrew Bartlett	57,641	10.70	+2.32
Sex Party	Rory Killen	7,125	1.32	+1.32
Independent	Chris Carson	4,733	0.88	+0.88
Total formal votes		538,670		
Informal votes		11,778		
Turnout		550,448		
Two-party-preferred result
Liberal National	Graham Quirk	340,464	68.53	+2.43
Labor	Ray Smith	156,357	31.47	−2.43
Liberal National hold		Swing	+2.43	

=== Gold Coast ===
2012 Queensland mayoral elections: Gold Coast
Party	Candidate	Votes	%	±%
Independent LNP	Tom Tate	83,876	37.05	
Independent	Eddy Sarroff	40,958	18.09	
Independent	Susie Douglas	35,417	15.65	
Independent	Peter Young	26,977	11.92	
Independent	Dean Vegas	20,868	9.22	
Independent	Keith Douglas	14,702	6.49	
Independent	John Abbott	3,568	1.58	
Total formal votes		226,366	95.48	
Informal votes		10,724	4.52	
Turnout		237,090		
Two-candidate-preferred result
Independent LNP	Tom Tate	90,935	64.34	
Independent	Eddy Sarroff	50,399	35.66	
Independent LNP gain from Independent		Swing		

=== Redland ===
2012 Queensland mayoral elections: Redland
Party	Candidate	Votes	%	±%
Independent	Karen Williams	52,249	69.51	
Independent	Melva Hobson	22,914	30.49	
Turnout		78,283	83.81	
Independent gain from Independent		Swing		

=== Townsville ===
2012 Queensland mayoral elections: Townsville
Party	Candidate	Votes	%	±%
Team Jenny Hill	Jenny Hill	28,508	33.74	+33.74
Townsville First	Dale Last	26,898	31.83	+31.83
Independent	Jeff Jimmieson	15,301	18.11	+18.11
Independent	Brendan Porter	12,277	14.53	+14.53
Independent	Harry Patel	1,516	1.79	+1.79
Total formal votes		84,500	96.34	−2.37
Informal votes		3,207	3.66	+2.37
Turnout		87,707	80.05	
Two-candidate-preferred result
Team Jenny Hill	Jenny Hill	32,946	51.58	+51.58
Townsville First	Dale Last	30,928	48.42	+48.42
Team Jenny Hill gain from Team Tyrell		Swing		

- Incumbent mayor Les Tyrell (Team Tyrell) did not recontest
