= 2016 Queensland mayoral elections =

Australian mayoral election

← 2012	19 March 2016	2020 →

The 2016 Queensland mayoral elections were held on 19 March 2016 to elect the mayors of the 77 local government areas in Queensland, Australia. The elections were held as part of the statewide local elections.

== Results ==
=== Brisbane ===
2016 Queensland mayoral elections: Brisbane
Party	Candidate	Votes	%	±%
Liberal National	Graham Quirk	325,714	53.38	−8.56
Labor	Rod Harding	195,055	31.96	+6.80
Greens	Ben Pennings	63,483	10.40	−0.30
Consumer Rights	Jeffrey Hodges	12,960	2.12	+2.12
People Decide	Karel Boele	5,195	0.85	+0.85
Independent	Jim Eldridge	4,764	0.78	+0.78
Independent	Jarrod Wirth	3,063	0.50	+0.50
Total formal votes		610,234		
Informal votes		15,287		
Turnout		625,521		
Two-party-preferred result
Liberal National	Graham Quirk	336,450	59.31	−9.19
Labor	Rod Harding	230,841	40.69	+9.19
Liberal National hold		Swing		

=== Gold Coast ===
2016 Queensland mayoral elections: Gold Coast
Party	Candidate	Votes	%	±%
Independent LNP	Tom Tate	172,735	63.86	
Independent	Penny Toland	53,081	19.62	
Independent	Jim Wilson	25,181	9.31	
Independent	Brett Lambert	8,151	3.01	
Independent	Andrew Middleton	5,978	2.21	
Independent	John Abbott	5,369	1.98	
Total formal votes		270,495	94.73	
Informal votes		15,050	5.27	
Turnout		285,545		
Two-candidate-preferred result
Independent LNP	Tom Tate	176,538	73.14	
Independent	Penny Toland	64,826	26.86	
Independent LNP hold		Swing		

=== Townsville ===
2016 Queensland mayoral elections: Townsville
Party	Candidate	Votes	%	±%
Team Jenny Hill	Jenny Hill	58,862	59.51	+25.77
Jayne Arlett's Team	Jayne Arlett	34,849	35.23	+35.23
Independent	William Hankin	3,237	3.27	+3.27
Independent	Harry Patel	1,970	1.99	+0.20
Total formal votes		98,918	97.01	+0.67
Informal votes		3,207	2.99	−0.67
Turnout		101,965	80.05	
Two-candidate-preferred result
Team Jenny Hill	Jenny Hill	59,881	62.69	+11.11
Jayne Arlett's Team	Jayne Arlett	35,639	37.31	+37.31
Team Jenny Hill hold		Swing	+11.11	
