= Bauhinia, Queensland =

Bauhinia
- Town
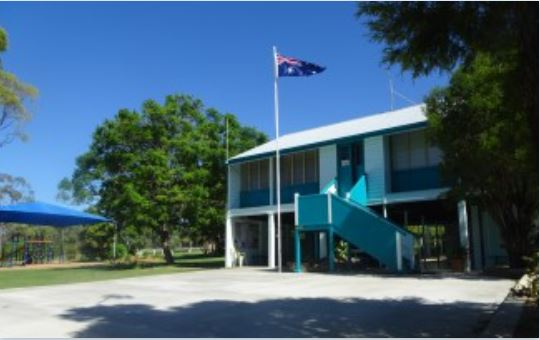
- Bauhinia State School, 2022

- Interactive map of Bauhinia
- Coordinates: 24.5683°S 149.2930°E
- Country: Australia
- State: Queensland
- LGAs: Central Highlands Region; Aboriginal Shire of Woorabinda
- Location: 74.1 km (46.0 mi) W of Moura; 215 km (134 mi) SE of Emerald; 221 km (137 mi) SW of Rockhampton; 617 km (383 mi) NW of Brisbane

Government
  - State electorate: Gregory
  - Federal division: Flynn

Area
  - Total: 225.4 km^{2} (87.0 sq mi)

Population
  - Total: 28 (2021 census)
  - Density: 0.1242/km^{2} (0.322/sq mi)
- Time zone: UTC+10:00 (AEST)
- Postcode: 4718
Localities around Bauhinia
Goomally	Goomally	Oombabeer
Dromedary	Bauhinia	Oombabeer
Mungabunda	Mungabunda	Rhydding

Bauhinia is a rural town in the Central Highlands Region and a rural locality split between the Central Highlands Region and the Aboriginal Shire of Woorabinda, both in Queensland, Australia. In the 2021 census, the locality of Bauhinia had a population of 28 people.

== Geography ==
The town is located near the junction of the Dawson Highway and the Fitzroy Developmental Road. The bulk of the locality is within Central Highlands Region, but the south-east of the locality is part of the Aboriginal Shire of Woorabinda.

The land use is crop growing around the Zamia Creek in the east and south-east of the locality. Apart from that, the predominant land use is grazing on native vegetation.

== History ==
Bauhinia State School opened on 20 March 1967. In 2017, the school celebrated its 50th anniversary.

== Demographics ==
In the 2016 census, the locality of Bauhinia had a population of 47 people.

In the 2021 census, the locality of Bauhinia had a population of 28 people.

== Education ==
Bauhinia State School is a government primary (Prep-6) school for boys and girls at 11559 Fitzroy Development Road (24.5666°S 149.2960°E). In 2013, the school had 15 students and 2 teachers (1 full-time equivalent). In 2018, the school had an enrolment of 22 students with 3 teachers (2 full-time equivalent) and 6 non-teaching staff (2 full-time equivalent).

There are no secondary schools in Bauhinia; the nearest government secondary school is Moura State High School in Moura to the east, but it is sufficiently distant that alternatives would be distance education and boarding school.

== Facilities ==
The Central Highlands Regional Council operates a library at Eulan Downs, Moura, which is available by appointment only. The library does not offer internet access.
