= 2008 Queensland mayoral elections =

Australian mayoral election

← 2004	15 March 2008	2012 →

The 2008 Queensland mayoral elections were held on 15 March 2008 to elect the mayors of the 77 local government areas in Queensland, Australia. The elections were held as part of the statewide local elections.

== Results ==
=== Brisbane ===
2008 Queensland mayoral elections: Brisbane
Party	Candidate	Votes	%	±%
Liberal	Campbell Newman	335,076	60.07	+12.87
Labor	Greg Rowell	161,845	29.01	−11.59
Greens	Jo-Anne Bragg	46,733	8.38	−1.82
Independent	Robert Campbell	8,439	1.51	+1.51
Independent	Louise Day	1,801	0.32	+0.32
Independent	Bryan Crawford	1,331	0.24	+0.24
Independent	David Alan Couper	952	0.17	+0.17
Independent	James Patrick Sinnamon	856	0.15	+0.15
Independent	Derek Rosborough	773	0.14	+0.14
Total formal votes		557,806		
Informal votes		9,618		
Turnout		567,424		
Two-party-preferred result
Liberal	Campbell Newman		66.1	+13.7
Labor	Greg Rowell		33.9	−13.7
Liberal hold		Swing	+13.7	

=== Gold Coast ===
2008 Queensland mayoral elections: Gold Coast
Party	Candidate	Votes	%	±%
Independent	Ron Clarke	79,463	35.62	
Liberal	Tom Tate	59,585	26.71	+26.71
Unite GC	Rob Molhoek	57,605	25.82	+25.82
Independent	John Bradford	20,754	9.30	
Independent	Ray Schearer	5,704	2.56	
Total formal votes		223,111	95.71	
Informal votes		10,005	4.29	
Turnout		233,116		
Two-candidate-preferred result
Independent	Ron Clarke	90,418	53.99	
Liberal	Tom Tate	77,039	46.01	+46.01
Independent hold		Swing		

=== Townsville ===
2008 Queensland mayoral elections: Townsville
Party	Candidate	Votes	%	±%
Team Tyrell	Les Tyrell	47,956	54.64	+54.64
Labor	Tony Mooney	31,524	35.91	−37.65
Community Voices	Jenny Stirling	6,343	7.23	
Independent	Rolando Taviani	1,292	1.47	
Independent	Francis Pauler	660	0.75	
Total formal votes		87,775	98.71	
Informal votes		1,145	1.29	
Turnout		88,920		
Team Tyrell gain from Labor		Swing		
