= Dawson Highway =

State highway in Queensland, Australia

Dawson Highway Queensland
- Dawson Highway (green on black)

General information
- Type: Highway
- Length: 405 km (252 mi)
- Route number(s): State Route 60 (Gladstone – Rolleston); A7 (Rolleston – Springsure)
- Former route number: National Route 55 (Rolleston – Springsure)

Major junctions
- East end: Glenlyon Street (State Route 58), Gladstone
- Bruce Highway (Queensland Highway A1); Burnett Highway (State Highway A3); Leichhardt Highway (State Highway A5); Fitzroy Developmental Road (State Route 7); Carnarvon Highway (State Highway A7)
- West end: Gregory Highway (State Highway A7), Springsure

Location(s)
- Major settlements: Calliope, Biloela, Banana, Bauhinia, Moura, Rolleston

Highway system
- Highways in Australia; National Highway • Freeways in Australia; Highways in Queensland

The Dawson Highway is a state highway in Queensland, Australia. It runs for 405 kilometres (252 mi) between Gladstone and Springsure where it terminates. From Gladstone to Rolleston it is signed as State Route 60, and then A7 onwards to Springsure. It continues west for another 247 kilometres (153 mi) as Dawson Developmental Road to Tambo on the Landsborough Highway. North of Springsure, A7 becomes the Gregory Highway.

Many of the towns along the Dawson Highway are coal-mining establishments.

== State-controlled road ==
Dawson Highway is a state-controlled regional road, a small part of which is rated as "state-strategic". It is defined in four sections, as follows:

- Number 46A, Gladstone to Biloela.
- Number 46B, Biloela to Banana.
- Number 46C, Banana to Rolleston.
- Number 46D, Rolleston to Springsure, part state-strategic.

== List of towns along the Dawson Highway ==
- Gladstone (Gladstone Region)
  - Gladstone Central
  - West Gladstone
  - New Auckland
  - Clinton
- Calliope
- Biloela (Shire of Banana)
- Banana
- Moura
  - Bauhinia (Central Highlands Region)
- Rolleston
- Springsure

== Major intersections ==
LGA	Location	km	mi	Destinations	Notes
Gladstone	Gladstone	0	0.0	Glenlyon Street (State Route 58) – north–west – Mount Larcom (to Bruce Highway northbound) / south–east – Benaraby (to Bruce Highway southbound) / Bramston Street north–east – Gladstone CBD	Eastern end of Dawson Highway (State Route 60)
Gladstone	Calliope	19.0	11.8	Bruce Highway (Queensland Highway A1) – south – Benaraby	Southbound exit to Bruce Highway
Gladstone	Calliope	19.2	11.9	Bruce Highway (Queensland Highway A1) – north – Mount Larcom	Northbound exit to Bruce Highway
Gladstone	Calliope	25.7	16.0	Gladstone–Monto Road (State Route 69) – south–east – Monto	
Banana	Biloela	120	75	Burnett Highway (State Route A3) – south–east – Thangool	Eastern concurrency terminus with Burnett Highway
Banana	Biloela	121	75	Burnett Highway (State Route A3) – north–west – Dululu	Western concurrency terminus with Burnett Highway
Banana	Banana	165	103	Leichhardt Highway (State Route A5) – north – Dululu	Northern concurrency terminus with Leichhardt Highway
Banana	Banana	166	103	Leichhardt Highway (State Route A5) – south – Theodore	Southern concurrency terminus with Leichhardt Highway
Central Highlands	Rhydding	240	150	Fitzroy Developmental Road (State Route 7) – south – Taroom	Eastern concurrency terminus with Fitzroy Developmental Road; See map of Rhydding
Central Highlands	Bauhinia	258	160	Fitzroy Developmental Road (State Route 7) – north – Woorabinda	Western concurrency terminus with Fitzroy Developmental Road
Central Highlands	Rolleston	335	208	Carnarvon Highway (State Route A7) – south–west – Roma	Dawson Highway continues north-west as State Route A7
Central Highlands	Springsure	405	252	Gregory Highway (State Route A7) – north – Emerald	Western end of Dawson Highway
1.000 mi = 1.609 km; 1.000 km = 0.621 mi: Concurrency terminus; Route transition

== Intersecting state-controlled roads ==
In addition to the Bruce, Burnett, Leichhardt, Carnarvon and Gregory Highways, and the Fitzroy and Dawson Developmental Roads, the following state-controlled roads, from east to west, intersect with the Dawson Highway:

- Gladstone–Mount Larcom Road
- Gladstone–Benaraby Road
- Gladstone–Monto Road
- Biloela–Callide Road
- Blackwater–Rolleston Road
- Orion Ten Chain Road

=== Biloela–Callide Road ===
Biloela–Callide Road
- Location: Dawson Highway, Mount Murchison to Callide Dam, Mount Murchison
- Length: 11.8 km (7.3 mi)

Biloela–Callide Road is a state-controlled district road (number 472), rated as a local road of regional significance (LRRS). It runs from the Dawson Highway in Mount Murchison to the Callide Dam in Mount Murchison, a distance of 11.8 kilometres (7.3 mi). It does not intersect with any other state-controlled roads.

=== Blackwater–Rolleston Road ===
Blackwater–Rolleston Road
- Location: Dawson Highway, Blackwater to Capricorn Highway, Rolleston
- Length: 120 km (75 mi)

Blackwater–Rolleston Road is a state-controlled district road (number 469), rated as a local road of regional significance (LRRS). It runs from the Capricorn Highway in Blackwater to the Dawson Highway in Rolleston, a distance of 120 kilometres (75 mi). It does not intersect with any other state-controlled roads.

=== Orion Ten Chain Road ===
Orion Ten Chain Road
- Location: Dawson Highway, Orion to Karingal Homestead, Orion
- Length: 19.3 km (12.0 mi)

Orion Ten Chain Road is a state-controlled district road (number 4603), rated as a local road of regional significance (LRRS). It runs from the Dawson Highway in Orion to Karingal Homestead in Orion, a distance of 19.3 kilometres (12.0 mi). It does not intersect with any other state-controlled roads.

The road name indicates a width of ten chains (220 yards (200 m)) for the road reserve, meaning that it is part of Australia's travelling stock route network.

== Upgrades ==
=== Replace bridges ===
The existing timber bridges on the Dawson Highway were subject to regular closures due to flooding. The $40 million replacement of 5 timber bridges project was completed in April 2018. The timber bridges were replaced with concrete structures to increase freight efficiency and flood immunity along the Dawson Highway. The new bridges were constructed at; Nine Mile Creek, Catfish Creek, Sheep Station Creek, Maxwelton Creek and Doubtful Creek.

=== Replace bridge near Tambo ===
A project to replace a timber bridge over the Barcoo River immediately north of Tambo, at a cost of $7 million, was expected to complete in mid-2022.

=== Replace Roundstone Creek bridge ===
A project to replace the Roundstone Creek bridge, at a cost of $12 million, was expected to complete in early 2022.

=== Strengthen bridges and improve pavement ===
A project to strengthen 5 bridges and to widen and rehabilitate 3 kilometres (1.9 mi) of paving, at a cost of $14.2 million, was expected to complete in June 2022 (the pavement component was completed in January 2021)

=== Design cycle facilities ===
A project to design cycle facilities for Glenlyon Street to Harvey Road in Gladstone, at a cost of $2.05 million, was to complete in December 2021.

== Roads of Strategic Importance Upgrades ==
The Roads of Strategic Importance initiative, last updated in March 2022, includes the following projects for the Dawson Highway.

=== Corridor upgrade ===
A lead project to upgrade the Townsville to Roma corridor, including sections of the Gregory, Carnarvon and Dawson Highways and surrounding state and council roads, at an estimated cost of $125 million, commenced construction of some work projects in 2020. Planning continues for other projects.

=== Pavement strengthening and widening ===
A project to strengthen and widen sections of pavement between Banana and Rolleston at a cost of $6 million was completed in December 2020. This project was targeted for "early works" by the Queensland Government.

=== Roundstone Creek bridge overflow upgrade ===
A project to upgrade the Roundstone Creek bridge overflow at a cost of $6 million is due for completion in mid-2022. This project is targeted for "early works" by the Queensland Government.

=== Biloela heavy vehicle bypass ===
A project to construct a heavy vehicle bypass of Biloela for the Dawson Highway at a cost of $2.7 million is due for completion in late 2022.

=== Progressive sealing and new bridge ===
A project to upgrade and seal sections of the Dawson Developmental Road, and to build a new bridge over the Barcoo River, at a cost of $57 million is expected to finish in mid-2023. This project was targeted for "early works" by the Queensland Government, and has been split into two packages.

== Proposals ==
The Queensland Inland Freight Route is a proposal to upgrade the existing highways from Charters Towers to Mungindi. This would involve significant upgrades to the Dawson Highway between Springsure and Rolleston.

== See also ==
- Highways in Australia
- List of highways in Queensland
