= Fitzroy Developmental Road =

Road in Queensland, Australia

Fitzroy Developmental Road Queensland
- Fitzroy Developmental Road (green and black)

General information
- Type: Rural road
- Length: 454 km (282 mi)
- Route number(s): State Route 7; Taroom - Rhydding; Bauhinia - Duaringa; State Route 67; Dingo - Strathfield

Major junctions
- South end: Leichhardt Highway Taroom
- Dawson Highway; (State Route 60); Capricorn Highway; (State Highway A4)
- North end: State Route 70 (Peak Downs Highway) Strathfield

Location(s)
- Major settlements: Rhydding, Bauhinia, Duaringa, Dingo

The Fitzroy Developmental Road is a designated road in the Central Highlands Region of Queensland consisting of three separate sections. The general direction is from south to north. It is nicknamed the Beef Road.

== Route description ==
=== Southern section ===
The southern section leaves the Leichhardt Highway at a point 17 kilometres (11 mi) north of Taroom as State Route 7. This section meets the Dawson Highway in the locality of Rhydding, 19 kilometres (12 mi) east of Bauhinia.

=== Middle section ===
The middle section, as State Route 7, runs from Bauhinia north until it meets the Capricorn Highway about 2 kilometres (1.2 mi) west of Duaringa, and 29 kilometres (18 mi) east of Dingo. It passes through the Dawson Range State Forest between Woorabinda and Duaringa.

=== Northern section ===
The northern section, as State Route 67, runs from Dingo to a point on the Peak Downs Highway in the locality of Strathfield, 21 kilometres (13 mi) east of Coppabella. It crosses the Mackenzie River and passes the mining towns of Middlemount and Dysart.

=== Length details ===
The southern section is 115 kilometres (71 mi) in length, and is mostly unsealed.

The middle section is 103 kilometres (64 mi) in length and is partly sealed.

The northern section is 236 kilometres (147 mi) in length and is fully sealed. The length of the three sections totals 454 kilometres (282 mi) but with the addition of travel on the Dawson and Capricorn Highways, it is around 502 kilometres (312 mi).

=== Road details ===
All sections are state-controlled roads. The southern and middle sections (numbers 85A and 85B) are district roads rated as local roads of regional significance (LRRS). The northern section (number 85C) is a regional road.

== Upgrades ==
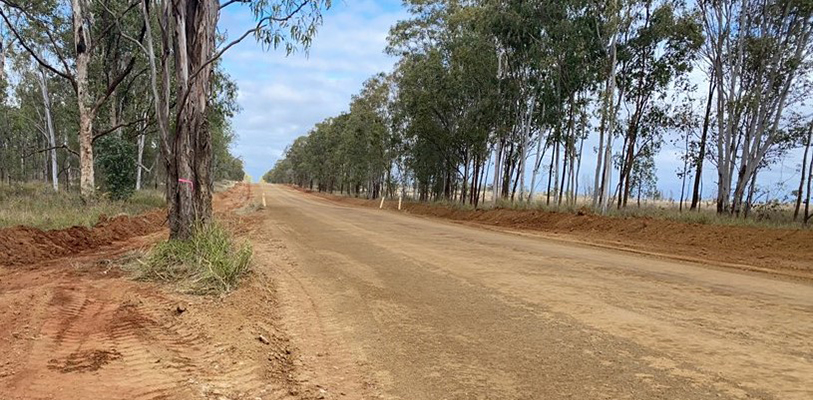
Unsealed section in Goomally, 2024

=== Progressive sealing ===
A project to progressively seal sections of the road north of Bauhinia, at a cost of $6 million, was expected to complete by early 2022.

A project to progressively seal sections of the road north of Taroom, at a cost of $8 million, was expected to complete in mid-2022.

== Major intersections ==
LGA	Location	km	mi	Destinations	Notes
Banana	Taroom	0	0.0	Leichhardt Highway – north–east – Theodore / south – Taroom	Southern end of southern section of Fitzroy Developmental Road (State Route 7); This section is shown as Taroom Bauhinia Downs Road on Google maps.
Central Highlands	Rhydding	115	71	Dawson Highway – west – Bauhinia / east – Banana	T junction. Northern end of southern section. Eastern concurrency terminus with Dawson Highway. Traffic for Fitzroy Developmental Road continues west on Dawson Highway.
Central Highlands	Bauhinia	134	83	Dawson Highway – south–west – Rolleston	Y intersection. Western concurrency terminus with Dawson Highway. Southern end of middle section of Fitzroy Developmental Road, which continues north.
Central Highlands	Duaringa	237	147	Capricorn Highway – west – Dingo / east – Duaringa	T junction. Northern end of middle section and of State Route 7. Eastern concurrency terminus with Capricorn Highway. Traffic for Fitzroy Developmental Road continues west on Capricorn Highway.
Central Highlands	Dingo	266	165	Capricorn Highway – west – Bluff	T junction. Western concurrency terminus with Capricorn Highway.
Central Highlands	Dingo				Southern end of northern section of Fitzroy Developmental Road, which continues north as State Route 67.
Isaac	Strathfield	502	312	Peak Downs Highway – west – Clermont / east – Nebo	T junction. Northern end of Fitzroy Developmental Road (State Route 67)
1.000 mi = 1.609 km; 1.000 km = 0.621 mi: Concurrency terminus; Route transition

== See also ==
- Highways in Australia
- List of highways in Queensland
