= Jellinbah =

Jellinbah may refer to:

- Jellinbah, Queensland, a locality in the Central Highlands Region, Queensland, Australia
  - Jellinbah coal mine, a mine in Jellinbah, Central Highlands Region, Queensland, Australia
