= Yarrabee coal mine =

Mine in Queensland, Australia

Yarrabee Coal Mine
- Location within Queensland
- Location: Jellinbah, Queensland, Australia; 23°16′23″S 149°1′22″E
- Products: Thermal and Coking Coal
- Opened: 1994
- Company: Yancoal

The Yarrabee Coal Mine is a coal mine located in the Bowen Basin in Jellinbah in Central Queensland, Australia. The mine has coal reserves amounting to 180.6 million tonnes of Thermal and Coking coal, one of the largest coal reserves in Asia and the world. The mine has an annual production capacity of 3.2 million tonnes of coal. The coal is primarily sold for use as PCI coal in steel making.

Product coal is road hauled 37 km to the Boonal Joint Venture rail load out where it is loaded onto trains and railed to the Port of Gladstone. It is then Shipped to customers worldwide.

The open-cut mine is owned by Yancoal.

After Cyclone Oswald caused severe flooding in Queensland in January 2013 the owners declared force majeure. While production at the mine was only halted for one day, the railway used to transport the coal to port was damaged.

== See also ==
- Coal mining in Australia
- List of mines in Australia
