= Alsace, Queensland =

Alsace
- Suburb
- Interactive map of Alsace
- Coordinates: 23.2891°S 149.2747°E
- Country: Australia
- State: Queensland
- LGA: Central Highlands Region
- Location: 53.7 km (33.4 mi) N of Dingo; 178 km (111 mi) ENE of Emerald; 202 km (126 mi) W of Rockhampton; 822 km (511 mi) NNW of Brisbane

Government
  - State electorate: Gregory
  - Federal division: Flynn

Area
  - Total: 350.7 km^{2} (135.4 sq mi)

Population
  - Total: 11 (2021 census)
  - Density: 0.0314/km^{2} (0.081/sq mi)
- Time zone: UTC+10:00 (AEST)
- Postcode: 4702
Suburbs around Alsace
Bingegang	Mackenzie	Mackenzie
Jellinbah	Alsace	Mackenzie
Jellinbah	Dingo	Dingo

Alsace is a rural locality in the Central Highlands Region, Queensland, Australia. In the 2021 census, Alsace had a population of 11 people.

== Geography ==
The land is at an elevation of approximately 150 metres (490 ft) and is principally used for grazing. A number of creek flow through the locality towards its south-east where in neighbouring Dingo, they become tributaries of Lorraine Creek, which flows into the Mackenzie River and then the Fitzroy River, which enters the Coral Sea to the south of Rockhampton.

The Fitzroy Developmental Road forms the western boundary of the locality which has no internal roads.

== History ==
The locality is named after a pastoral property on the Leichhardt River. In the early 1870s, F.A. Brodie named two adjoining properties Alsace and Lorraine after the two regions Alsace and Lorraine in France that were lost to Germany in the Franco-Prussian War.

Alsace State School opened on 9 Aug 1977 and closed on 11 December 1987.

== Demographics ==
In the 2016 census, Alsace had a population of 3 people.

In the 2021 census, Alsace had a population of 11 people.

== Education ==
There are no schools in Alsace. The nearest primary school is in neighbouring Dingo to the south, over 50 kilometres away. The nearest secondary schools are in Blackwater and Middlemount, even further away. The alternatives are distance education and boarding school.
