= Boonal Joint Venture =

The Boonal Joint Venture is a coal load out facility located on the Capricorn Highway in Central Queensland of Australia. Coal from Both Yarrabee coal mine and Jellinbah coal mine are railed to the Port Of Gladstone from the Boonal load out facility. Coal is delivered by road train to the Boonal coal pad and is then stockpiled by track dozers. Track dozers then push the stockpiled coal into a reclaim hopper that feeds a surge bin on the opposite side of the highway. An operator then loads the individual train wagons with the surge bin from a control room.

== See also ==
- Rail transport in Queensland
