= Bingegang, Queensland =

Bingegang
- Suburb
- Interactive map of Bingegang
- Coordinates: 23.1177°S 149.1575°E
- Country: Australia
- State: Queensland
- LGA: Central Highlands Region
- Location: 71.6 km (44.5 mi) NNW of Dingo; 79.4 km (49.3 mi) SE of Middlemount; 219 km (136 mi) SE of Moranbah; 220 km (140 mi) WNW of Rockhampton; 831 km (516 mi) NNW of Brisbane

Government
  - State electorate: Gregory
  - Federal division: Flynn

Area
  - Total: 426.9 km^{2} (164.8 sq mi)

Population
  - Total: 0 (2021 census)
  - Density: 0.0000/km^{2} (0.0000/sq mi)
- Time zone: UTC+10:00 (AEST)
- Postcode: 4702
Suburbs around Bingegang
Mackenzie River	Mackenzie River	Mackenzie
Mackenzie River	Bingegang	Mackenzie
Jellinbah	Jellinbah	Alsace

Bingegang is a rural locality in the Central Highlands Region, Queensland, Australia. In the 2021 census, Bingegang had "no people or a very low population".

== Geography ==
Bingegang is about 613 kilometres (381 mi) away from Brisbane.

The Mackenzie River (the river) forms the northern and north-western boundary of the locality. Parker Creek forms part of the south-western boundary of the locality and then flows in a northerly direction through the locality to becomes a tributary of the Mackenzie River on the northern boundary (23.05°S 149.2°E). The south-eastern, southern and part of the south-western boundary of the locality roughly follows Return Creek (23.25°S 149.1666°E), which is a tributary of Parker Creek.

The Fitzroy Developmental Road enters the locality from the south (Jellinbah) and exits to the north-west (the locality of Mackenzie River).

Bingegang Weir (23.0725°S 149.0338°E) impounds the Mackenzie River. It is reached via Bingegan Weir Access Road.

The land use is predominantly grazing on native vegetation with some cropping in the north and south of the locality.

== History ==
Bingebgang Weir was completed in 1975 and raised in 1998.

== Demographics ==
In the 2016 census Bingegang had a population of 18 people.

In the 2021 census, Bingegang had "no people or a very low population".

== Education ==
There are no schools in Bingegang. The nearest government primary schools are Dingo State School in Dingo to the south and Middlemount Community School in Middlemount to the north-west. The nearest government secondary schools are Middlemount Community School in Middlemount to the north-west and Blackwater State High School in Blackwater to the south-west. However, all of these schools are sufficiently distant that distance education and boarding schools would be other options.

== Attractions ==
There is no public access allowed to the Bingegang Weir itself but boating and fishing is permitted if more than 200 metres (660 ft) from the weir (or as signed).
