= Blackwater Herald =

Australian weekly newspaper

The Blackwater Herald was a weekly newspaper published in Blackwater, Queensland from 5 August 1978 until 2 February 2016.

With the slogan "the coal country newspaper", the Blackwater Herald had a strong focus on the town of Blackwater which was experiencing rapid population growth at the time the newspaper was launched due to the coal mining boom in the district. The newspaper also published local news and information pertaining to other communities within the Duaringa Shire such as Bluff, Dingo and Duaringa.

The Blackwater Herald was originally independently owned but was bought by Australian Provincial Newspapers in 1992.

The last edition of the Blackwater Herald was published on 2 February 2016. The Blackwater Herald's closure was first mooted the previous year when it was revealed the newspaper was struggling to survive, and requested support from the Blackwater community.

After the final edition was published, there was a brief attempt to incorporate a Blackwater Herald-branded "lift-out" in the Wednesday edition of Emerald's bi-weekly newspaper Central Queensland News which featured a selected array of local news articles from Blackwater. However, this was soon phased out as the Central Queensland News moved from a bi-weekly newspaper to a weekly publication in 2016 before being discontinued entirely in 2020 as part of a wider News Corp Australia cull of regional mastheads.
