= Mackenzie, Queensland (Central Highlands) =

Mackenzie
- Suburb
- Interactive map of Mackenzie
- Coordinates: 23.1319°S 149.3833°E
- Country: Australia
- State: Queensland
- LGA: Central Highlands Region
- Location: 73.2 km (45.5 mi) N of Dingo; 184 km (114 mi) NE of Emerald; 221 km (137 mi) WNW of Rockhampton; 841 km (523 mi) NNW of Brisbane

Government
  - State electorate: Gregory
  - Federal division: Flynn

Area
  - Total: 950.3 km^{2} (366.9 sq mi)

Population
  - Total: 30 (2021 census)
  - Density: 0.032/km^{2} (0.082/sq mi)
- Time zone: UTC+10:00 (AEST)
- Postcode: 4702
Suburbs around Mackenzie
Mackenzie River	Clarke Creek	Mount Gardiner
Bingegang	Mackenzie	Mount Gardiner
Alsace	Dingo	Goowarra

Mackenzie is a rural locality in the Central Highlands Region, Queensland, Australia. In the 2021 census, Mackenzie had a population of 30 people.

== Geography ==
The Mackenzie River forms the eastern, northern and north-western boundary of the locality. The land in the north of the locality is lower-lying with elevations of 100 metres (330 ft) rising to higher levels of elevations of 200 metres (660 ft) in the south. Moultrie State Forest is in the south of the locality.

The land use is a mix of crop growing and grazing.

== History ==
The locality's name presumably derives from the Mackenzie River, which in turn was named by explorer Ludwig Leichhardt on 10 January 1845, after his friend pastoralist Evan Mackenzie of Kilcoy Station.

== Demographics ==
In the 2016 census, Mackenzie had a population of 37 people.

In the 2021 census, Mackenzie had a population of 30 people.

== Education ==
There are no schools in Mackenzie. The nearest government primary school is Dingo State School in neighbouring Dingo to the south, but, due to distances, it would only be accessible to students in southern Mackenzie. There are no secondary schools in or near Mackenzie. Alternatives are distance education and boarding school.
