= Judith Wright Arts Centre =

Arts centre in Fortitude Valley, Brisbane

- The Judy
- Interactive map of Judith Wright Arts Centre
- Address: 420 Brunswick Street (corner Berwick Street), Fortitude Valley
- Location: Brisbane, Queensland, Australia
- Coordinates: 27°27′34.64″S 153°2′11.91″E
- Owner: Queensland Government
- Capacity: 300
- Type: Visual and Performing Arts Centre
- Events: theatre, music, contemporary dance, circus, cabaret, art exhibitions

Construction
- Built: originally Bushells Tea Company
- Opened: October 2001

Website
- www.arts.qld.gov.au/about-us/our-spaces/judith-wright-arts-centre

The Judith Wright Arts Centre, formerly the Judith Wright Centre of Contemporary Arts, is a visual and performing arts centre in Fortitude Valley in Brisbane, Queensland. The venue was renovated and re-opened as an arts centre in October 2001. The Centre is named after Judith Wright, who was a Queensland poet, an advocate for Indigenous rights, and an environmental activist.

The Centre is managed by the Queensland Government through Arts Queensland. Affectionately called The Judy, it is located at corner of Berwick Street and 420 Brunswick Street in Fortitude Valley.

The venue includes performance spaces with three rehearsal studios for dance, theatre and music. The main performance space is a flexible black box theatre with scope for diverse types of performances. The venue encompasses a two-storey and a five-storey building. The larger structure was originally a factory for Bushell's Tea. Redevelopment of the site was designed by Cox Architects and built by Multiplex Constructions.

The Centre is home to several creative and cultural organisations, including the Aboriginal Centre for the Performing Arts, Artour, the Australasian Dance Collective, Blakdance, Carbon Creative, Circa Contemporary Circus, Creative Partnerships Australia, Flying Arts Alliance, Institute of Modern Art, and Musica Viva.

Each year, the venue hosts the Queensland Poetry Festival. It hosted the contemporary music event, BIGSOUND, from 2002 until 2018.

== See also ==
- Culture of Brisbane
