= Mackenzie River, Queensland =

Mackenzie River
- Suburb
- Interactive map of Mackenzie River
- Coordinates: 22.9730°S 148.8630°E
- Country: Australia
- State: Queensland
- LGA: Isaac Region
- Location: 145 km (90 mi) NE of Emerald; 177 km (110 mi) SE of Moranbah; 240 km (150 mi) NW of Rockhampton; 861 km (535 mi) NW of Brisbane

Government
  - State electorates: Gregory; Burdekin
  - Federal division: Capricornia

Area
  - Total: 3,389.8 km^{2} (1,308.8 sq mi)

Population
  - Total: 84 (2021 census)
  - Density: 0.02478/km^{2} (0.0642/sq mi)
- Time zone: UTC+10:00 (AEST)
- Postcode: 4705
Suburbs around Mackenzie River
Middlemount	May Downs	Clarke Creek
Bundoora; Lilydale	Mackenzie River	Mackenzie; Bingegang
Wyuna; Comet	Blackwater	Jellinbah

Mackenzie River is a locality in the Isaac Region, Queensland, Australia. In the 2021 census, Mackenzie River had a population of 84 people.

== Geography ==
The Mackenzie River forms the southern and eastern boundary of the locality.

In the far north of the locality are two protected areas, the Junee National Park and the Junee State Forest.

The locality is within the Bowen Basin coalfields and there are a number of active coal mines in the locality, including Foxleigh, Oak Park and Lake Lindsay coal mines with other areas being considered for future mines.

A railway line which is part of the Blackwater rail system passes through the south-west of the locality. There are three railway stations on this line within the locality (from north to south):

- Fairhill railway station (23.3077°S 148.5563°E)
- Yongala coal siding (23.3338°S 148.5725°E), which services the Yongala coal mine in neighbouring Wyuna to the south-west
- Mackenzie railway station (23.4259°S 148.6279°E)

Being in the north-west of the locality, the mines within Mackenzie River are not serviced by these stations but via the Goonyella railway line in neighbouring Middlemount.

The Fitzroy Developmental Road enters the locality from the east (Bingegang) and exits to the north-west (Middlemount / May Downs).

The land use is predominantly grazing on native vegetation.

== History ==
The locality's name presumably derives from the Mackenzie River, which in turn was named by explorer Ludwig Leichhardt on 10 January 1845, after his friend pastoralist Evan Mackenzie of Kilcoy Station.

Mackenzie River State School opened on 21 May 1973, but closed in 2018 after having no students enrol in 2017. It was at 31145 Fitzroy Developmental Road (22.9503°S 148.9287°E). The school's website was archived.

The Foxleigh opencut coal mine was established in 1999. Oak Park opencut coal mine was established in 2004. Lake Lindsay opencut coal mine was established in 2008.

== Demographics ==
In the 2016 census, Mackenzie River had a population of 71 people.

In the 2021 census, Mackenzie River had a population of 84 people.

== Education ==
There are no schools in Mackenzie River. The nearest government primary schools are in Middlemount and Tieri. The nearest government secondary schools are in Middlemount, Blackwater and Capella. However, some parts of Mackenzie River are too distant to attend these schools, so other options are distance education and boarding school.
