= Anthracite =

Hard, compact variety of coal

Anthracite coal Black coal, hard coal, stone coal, blind coal, Kilkenny coal, crow coal, craw coal, black diamond
- Metamorphic rock
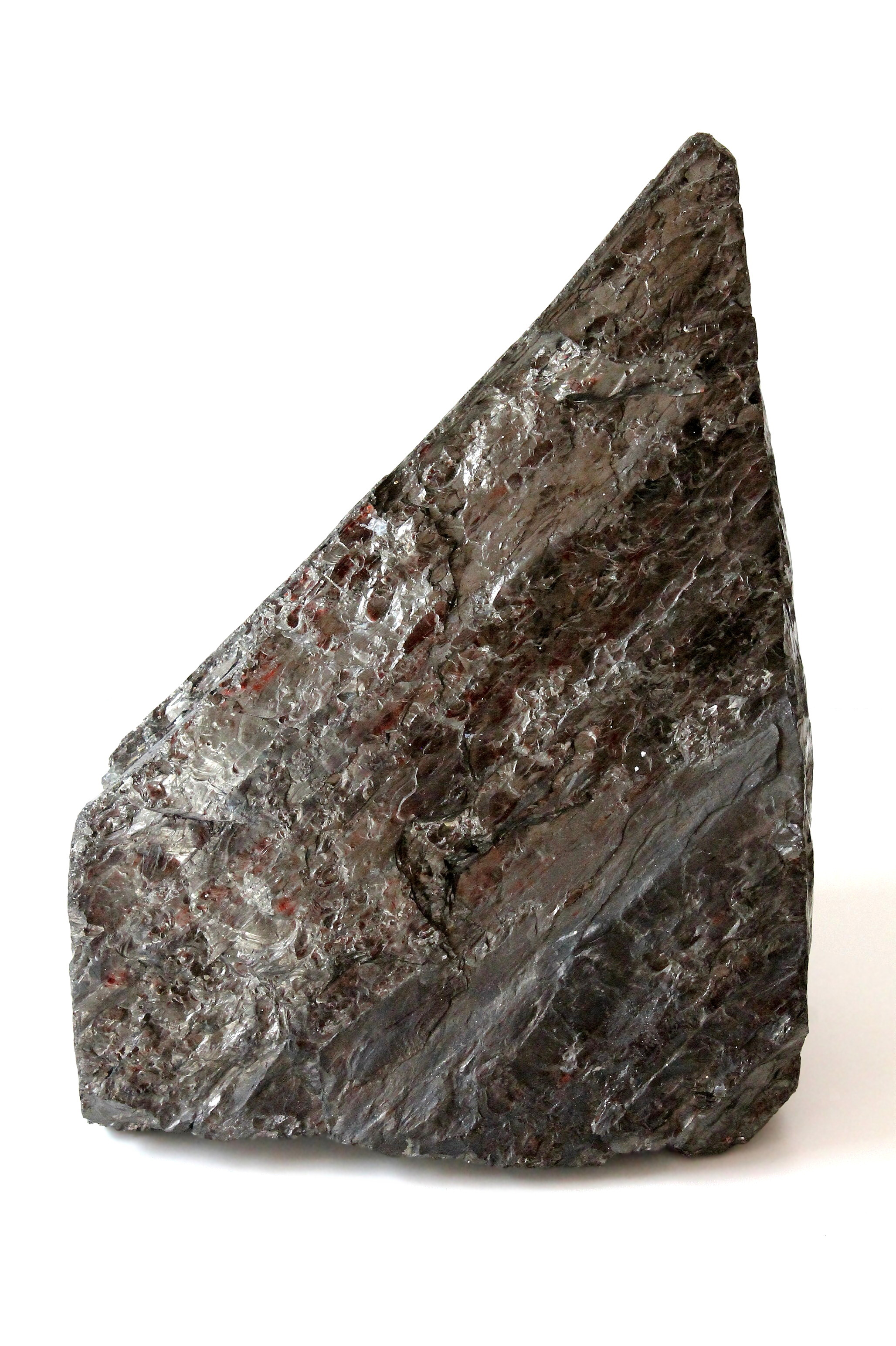
- Anthracite coal

Composition
- 86–97% carbon

Anthracite, also known as hard coal and black coal, is a hard, compact variety of coal that has a submetallic lustre. It has the highest carbon content, the fewest impurities, and the highest energy density of all types of coal and is the highest ranking of coals.

The Coal Region of Northeastern Pennsylvania in the United States has the largest known deposits of anthracite coal in the world with an estimated reserve of seven billion short tons (6.35 billion metric tons). China accounts for the majority of global production; other producers include Russia, Ukraine, North Korea, South Africa, Vietnam, Australia, Canada, and the United States. The total production of anthracite worldwide in 2023 was 632 million short tons (573 million metric tons).

Anthracite is the most metamorphosed type of coal, but still represents low-grade metamorphism, as found in the anthracite of the Narragansett Basin in Rhode Island which is of greenschist metamorphic facies (muscovite-chlorite sub-facies). The carbon content of anthracite is between 86% and 97%. The term is applied to those varieties of coal which do not give off tarry or other hydrocarbon vapours when heated below their point of ignition. Anthracite is difficult to ignite, and burns with a short, blue, and smokeless flame.

Anthracite is categorized into several grades. Standard grade anthracite is used predominantly in power generation, and high grade (HG) and ultra high grade (UHG) are used predominantly in the metallurgy sector. Anthracite accounts for about 1% of global coal reserves, and is mined in only a few countries around the world.

== Names ==
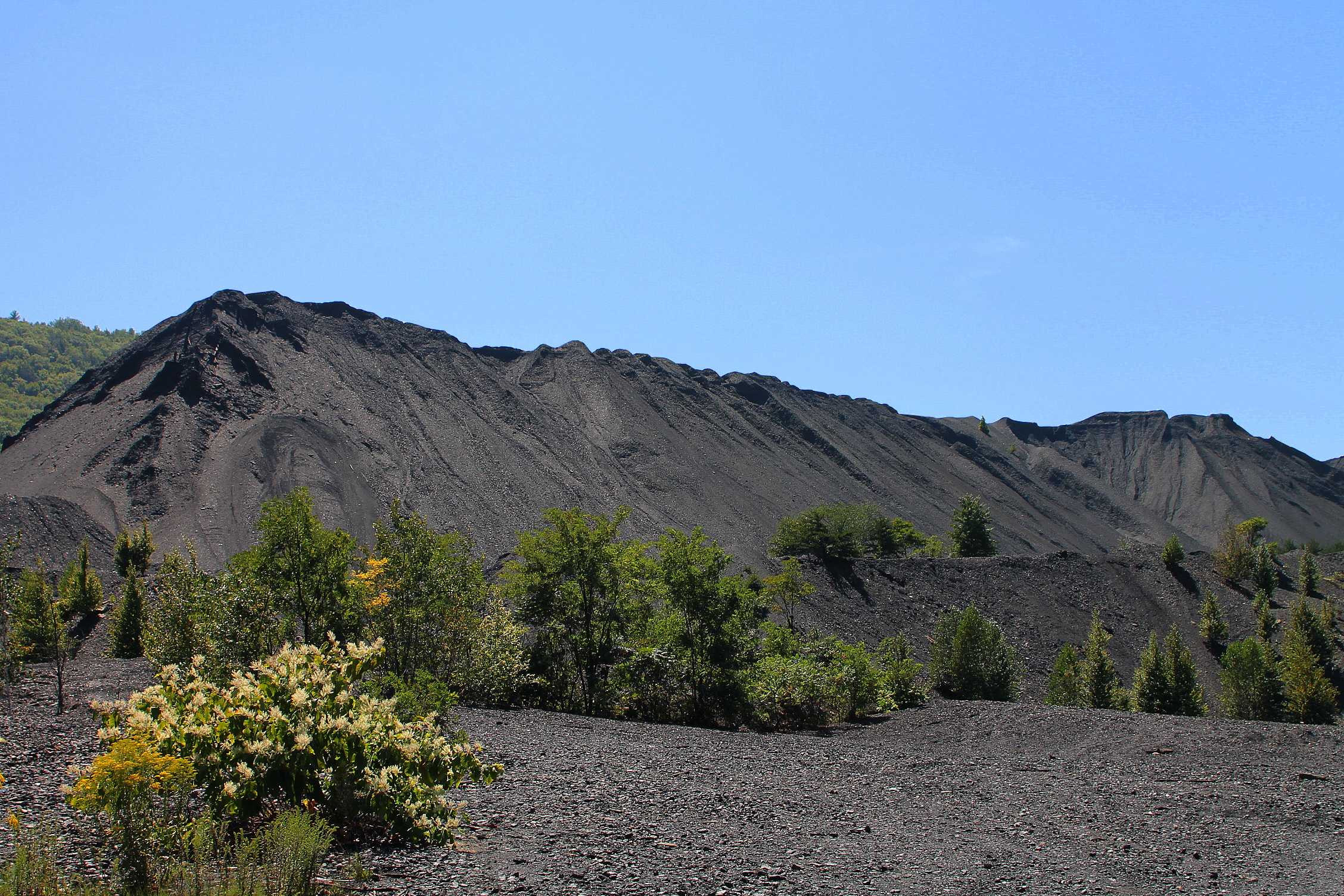
An anthracite pile in Trevorton, Pennsylvania

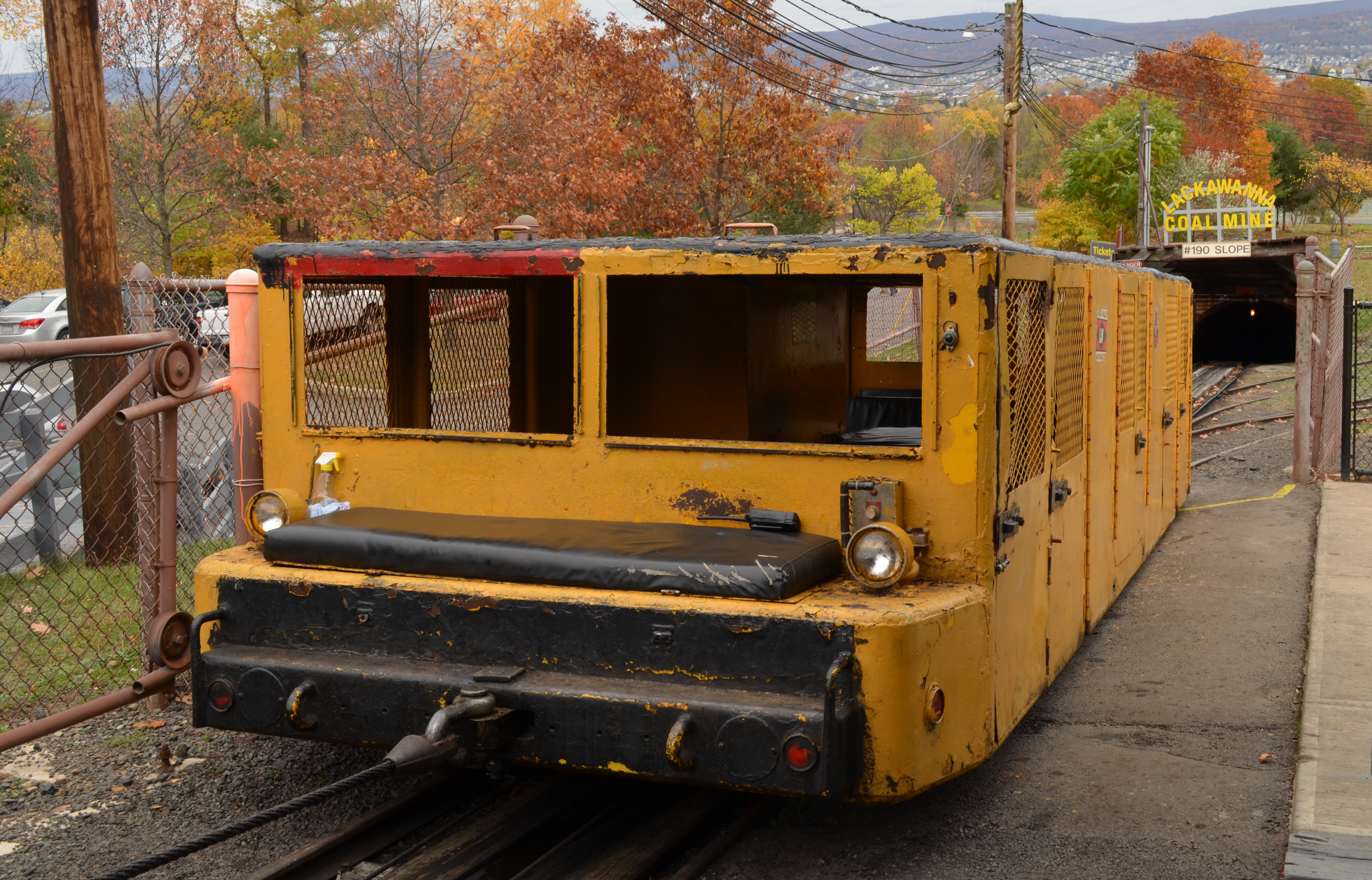
A coal mine car used to enter and exit the Lackawanna Coal Mine Tour, where Lackawanna Coal Mine once operated in Scranton, Pennsylvania

Anthracite derives from the Greek anthrakítēs (ἀνθρακίτης), literally "coal-like". Other terms which refer to anthracite are black coal, hard coal, stone coal, (Note: Not to be confused with the German Steinkohle or Dutch steenkool which are broader terms meaning all varieties of coal of a stonelike hardness and appearance, like bituminous coal and often anthracite as well, as opposed to lignite, which is softer.) dark coal, coffee coal, blind coal (in Scotland), Kilkenny coal (in Ireland), crow coal or craw coal, and black diamond. "Blue Coal" is the term for a once-popular and trademarked brand of anthracite, mined by the Glen Alden Coal Company in Pennsylvania, and sprayed with a blue dye at the mine before shipping to its Northeastern U.S. markets to distinguish it from its competitors.

Culm has different meanings in British and American English. In British English, culm is the imperfect anthracite, located predominantly north Devon and Cornwall, which was used as a pigment. The term is also used to refer to some carboniferous rock strata found in both Britain and in the Rhenish hill countries, also known as the Culm Measures. In Britain, it may also refer to coal exported from Britain during the 19th century. In American English, "culm" refers to the waste or slack from anthracite mining, mostly dust and small pieces not suitable for use in home furnaces.

== Properties ==
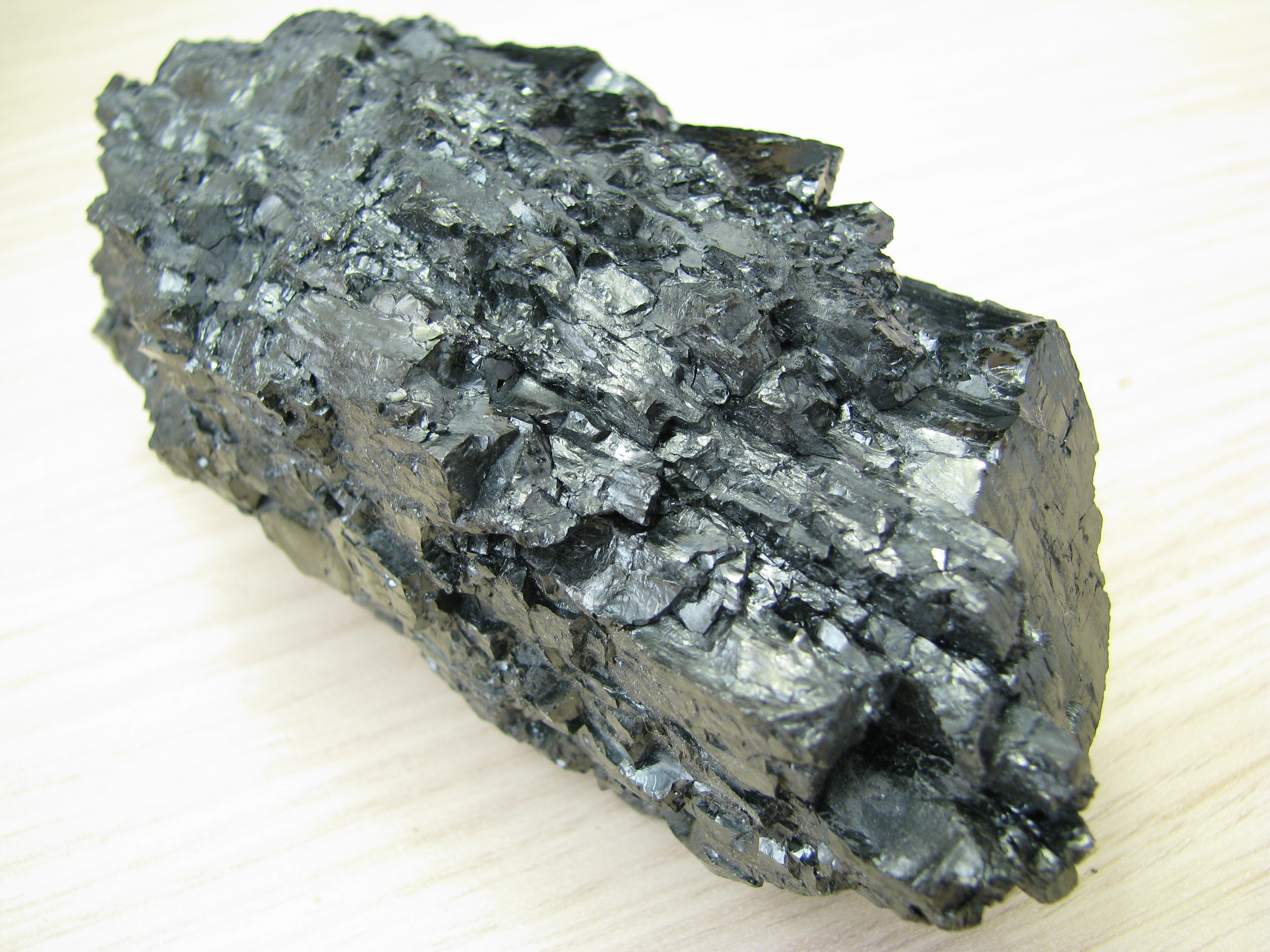
Anthracite coal from Ibbenbüren, Germany

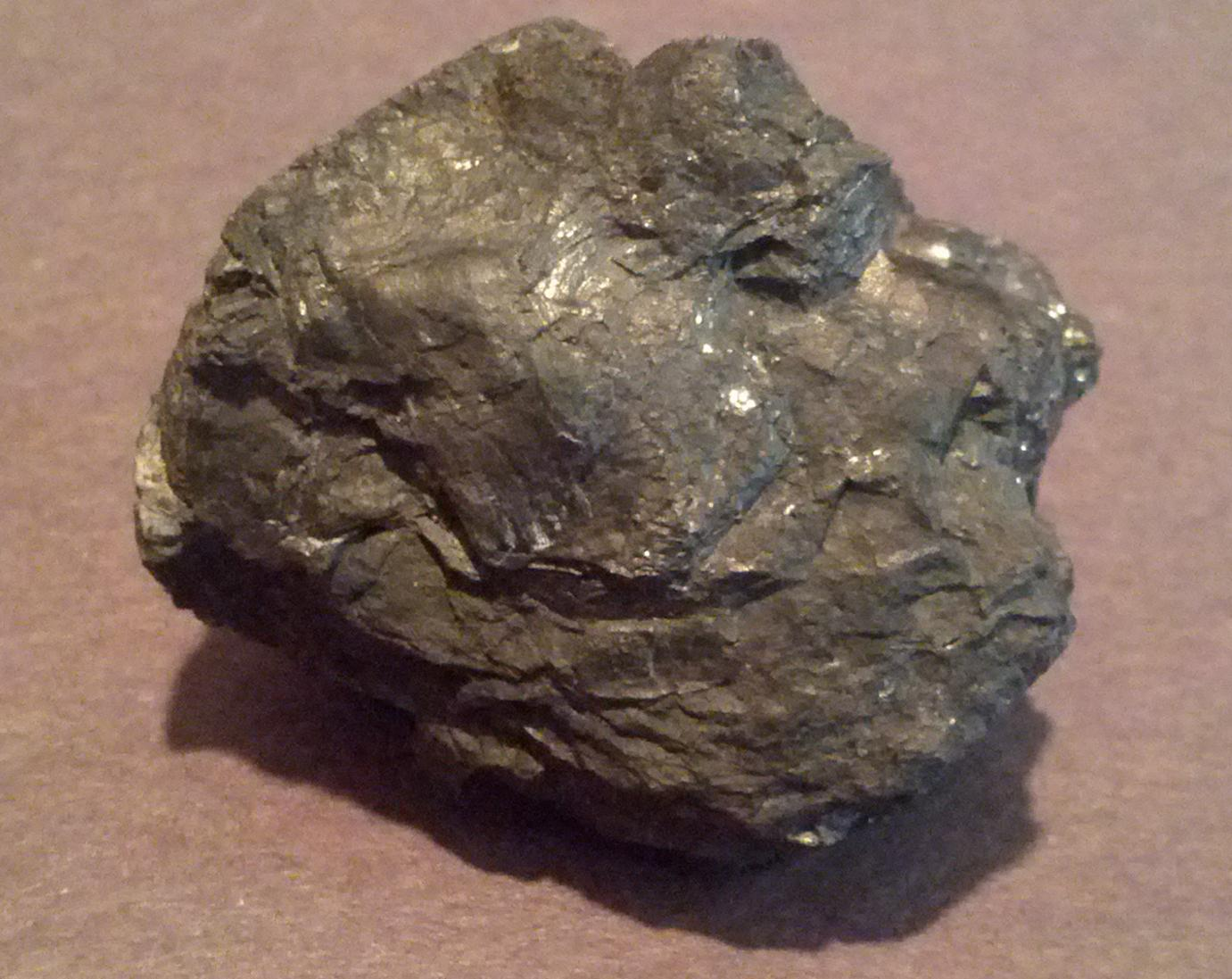
Anthracite from Bay City, Michigan

Anthracite is similar in appearance to the mineraloid jet and is sometimes used as a jet imitation.

Anthracite differs from ordinary bituminous coal by its greater hardness (2.75–3 on the Mohs scale), its higher relative density of 1.3–1.4, and luster, which is often semi-metallic with a mildly green reflection. It contains a high percentage of fixed carbon and a low percentage of volatile matter. It is also free from included soft or fibrous notches and does not soil the fingers when rubbed. Anthracitization is the transformation of bituminous coal into anthracite.

The moisture content of fresh-mined anthracite generally is less than 15 percent. The heat content of anthracite ranges from 26 to 33 MJ/kg (22 to 28 million Btu/short ton) on a moist, mineral-matter-free basis. The heat content of anthracite coal consumed in the United States averages 29 MJ/kg (25 million Btu/ton), on the as-received basis, containing both inherent moisture and mineral matter.

Since the 1980s, anthracite refuse or mine waste has been used for coal power generation in a form of recycling. The practice known as reclamation is being applied to culm piles antedating laws requiring mine owners to restore lands to their approximate original condition.

Chemically, anthracite may be considered as a transition stage between ordinary bituminous coal and graphite, produced by the more or less complete elimination of the volatile constituents of the former, and it is found most abundantly in areas that have been subjected to considerable stresses and pressures, such as the flanks of great mountain ranges. Anthracite is associated with strongly deformed sedimentary rocks that were subjected to higher pressures and temperatures (but short of metamorphic conditions) just as bituminous coal is generally associated with less deformed or flat-lying sedimentary rocks. The compressed layers of anthracite that are deep mined in the folded Ridge and Valley Province of the Appalachian Mountains of the Coal Region of East-central Pennsylvania are extensions of the same layers of bituminous coal that are mined on the generally flat lying and undeformed sedimentary rocks further west on the Allegheny Plateau of Kentucky and West Virginia, Eastern Ohio, and Western Pennsylvania.

In the same way the anthracite region of South Wales is confined to the contorted portion west of Swansea and Llanelli, the central and eastern portions producing steam coal, coking coal and domestic house coals.

Anthracite shows some alteration by the development of secondary divisional planes and fissures so that the original stratification lines are not always easily seen. The thermal conductivity is also higher; a lump of anthracite feels perceptibly colder when held in the warm hand than a similar lump of bituminous coal at the same temperature.

Anthracite has a history of use in blast furnaces for iron smelting; however, it lacked the pore space of metallurgical coke, which eventually replaced anthracite.

== History of mining and use ==
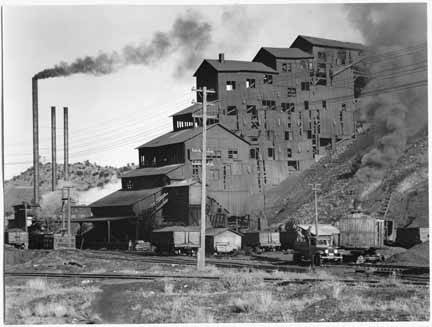
An anthracite coal breaker and power house buildings in Madrid, New Mexico, c. 1935

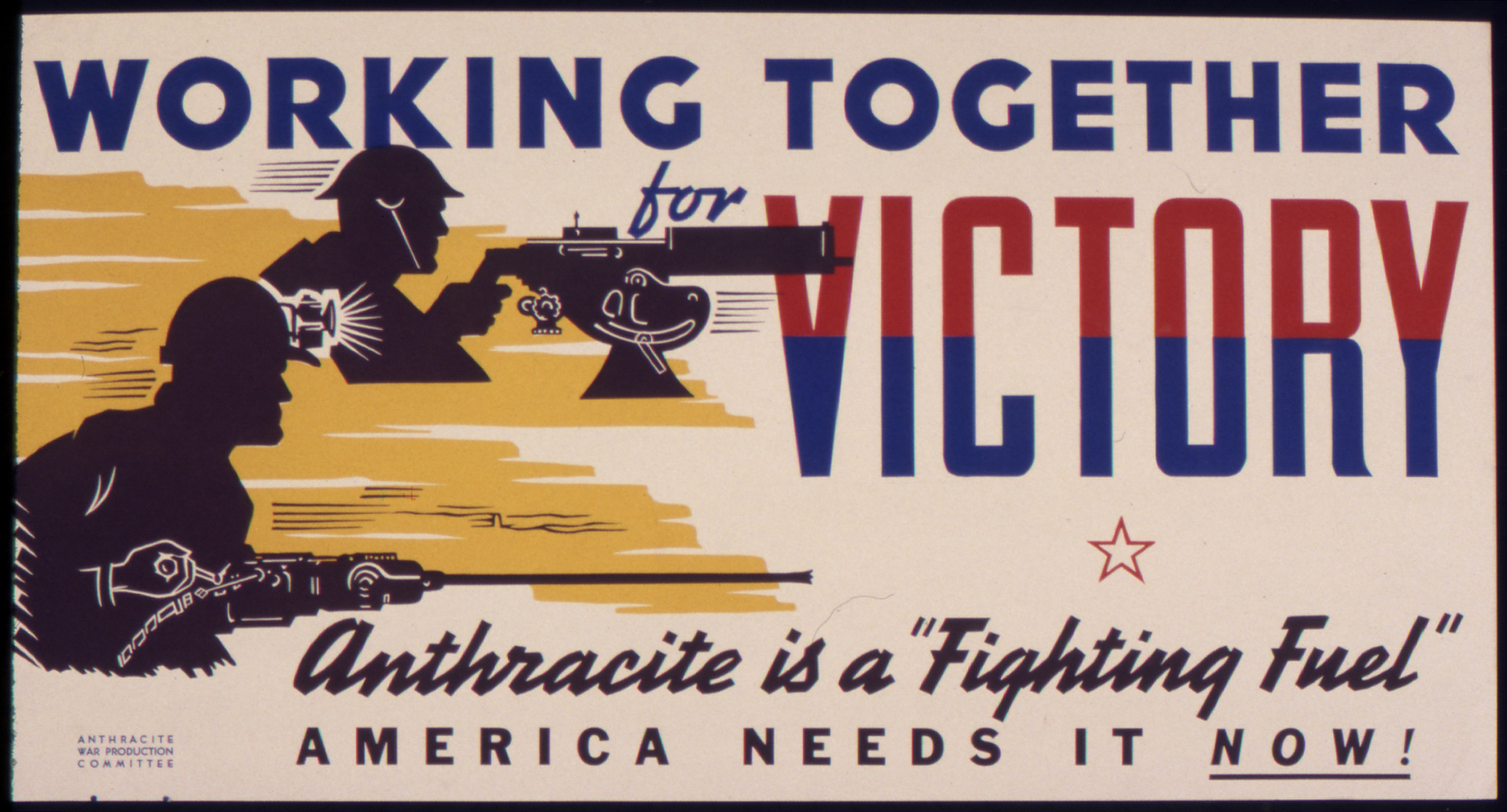
"Anthracite is a 'fighting fuel'", a World War II poster promoting anthracite, which was used extensively in military production

In southwest Wales, anthracite has been burned as a domestic fuel since at least medieval times, when it was mined near Saundersfoot. More recently, large-scale mining of anthracite took place across the western part of the South Wales Coalfield until the late 20th century.

In the United States, anthracite coal history began in 1790 in Pottsville, Pennsylvania, with the discovery of coal made by the hunter Necho Allen in what is now known as the Coal Region. Legend has it that Allen fell asleep at the base of Broad Mountain and woke to the sight of a large fire because his campfire had ignited an outcrop of anthracite coal.

By the late 18th century, it was known in the United States that anthracite could be burnt, but the techniques required to do so were unknown. Anthracite differs from wood and bituminous coal in that it has a higher ignition temperature and needs a fresh air draft from the bottom to burn. Several claims are made about who "first" burnt anthracite coal in the United States around this time, and all such claims originate from Pennsylvania. The city of Pottsville, Pennsylvania claims that their town was founded around an anthracite-fired iron furnace purchased by John Potts in 1806, which was built on the Schuylkill River in 1795. Pennsylvanian Charles V. Hagner recalls in his 1869 book that an unnamed employee of Josiah White and Erskine Hazard accidentally burnt anthracite in their rolling mill at the Falls of the Schuylkill River (after much failed experimentation with burning anthracite) at some point between 1812 and 1815. Judge Jesse Fell is claimed to be the first person to burn anthracite for the purposes of residential heating in the US in Wilkes-Barre, Pennsylvania on 11 February 1808. Judge Fell used an open grate in his fireplace to burn anthracite, as an experiment to prove that it was a viable residential heating fuel.

In spring 1808, John and Abijah Smith shipped the first commercially mined load of anthracite down the Susquehanna River from Plymouth, Pennsylvania, marking the birth of commercial anthracite mining in the United States. From that first mine, production rose to an all-time high of over 100 million tons in 1917.

The difficulty of igniting anthracite inhibited its early use, especially in blast furnaces for smelting iron. With the development of the hot blast in 1828, which used waste heat to preheat combustion air, anthracite became a preferred fuel, accounting for 45% of US pig iron production within 15 years. Anthracite iron smelting was later displaced by coke.

From the late 19th century until the 1950s, anthracite was the most popular fuel for heating homes and other buildings in the northern US, until it was supplanted by oil-burning systems, and more recently natural gas systems. Many large public buildings, such as schools, were heated with anthracite-burning furnaces through the 1980s.

During the American Civil War, Confederate blockade runners used anthracite as a smokeless fuel for their boilers to avoid revealing their position to the blockaders.

The invention of the Wootten firebox enabled locomotives to directly burn anthracite efficiently, particularly waste culm. In the early 20th century US, the Delaware, Lackawanna and Western Railroad started using only the more expensive anthracite coal in its passenger locomotives, dubbed themselves "The Road of Anthracite", and advertised widely that travelers on their line could make railway journeys without getting their clothing stained with soot. The advertisements featured a white-clad woman named Phoebe Snow and poems containing lines like "My gown stays white / From morn till night / Upon the road of Anthracite". Similarly, the Great Western Railway in the UK was able to use its access to anthracite (it dominated the anthracite region) to earn a reputation for efficiency and cleanliness unmatched by other UK companies.

Internal combustion motors driven by the so-called "mixed", "poor", "semi-water" or "Dowson gas" produced by the gasification of anthracite with air (and a small proportion of steam) were at one time the most economical method of obtaining power, requiring only 1 pound per horsepower-hour (0.6 kg/kWh), or less. Large quantities of anthracite for power purposes were formerly exported from South Wales to France, Switzerland and parts of Germany.

Commercial anthracite mining in Wales ceased in 2013, although a few large open cast sites remain, along with some relatively small drift mining operations. Commercial anthracite mining is still ongoing in Pennsylvania; the state produced a "total of 4,614,391 tons of [anthracite] coal, predominately from surface coal mines" in 2015.

== Anthracite today ==
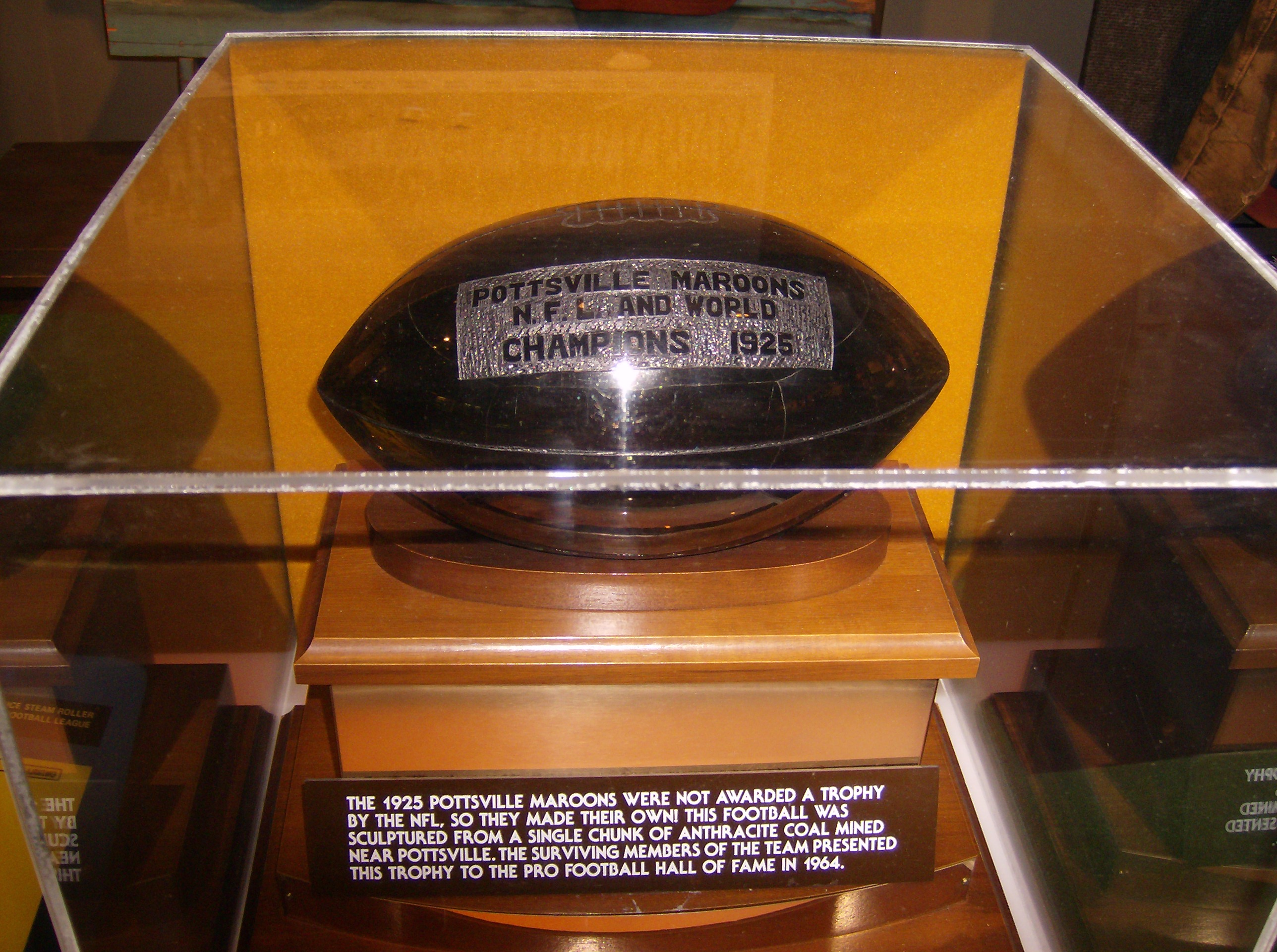
An American football trophy custom-made from anthracite

Anthracite generally costs two to six times as much as regular coal. In June 2008, the wholesale cost of anthracite was US$150/short ton, falling to $107/ton in 2021; it makes up 1% of U.S. coal production.

The principal use of anthracite today is for a domestic fuel in either hand-fired stoves or automatic stoker furnaces. It delivers high energy per its weight and burns cleanly with little soot, making it ideal for this purpose. Its high value makes it prohibitively expensive for power plant use. Other uses include the fine particles used as filter media, and as an ingredient in charcoal briquettes. Anthracite was an authorised fuel in terms of the United Kingdom's Clean Air Act 1993, meaning that it could be used within a designated Smoke Control Area such as the central London boroughs.

=== Mining ===
As of 2023, China mines by far the largest share of global anthracite production, accounting for more than three-quarters of global output. Most Chinese production is of standard-grade anthracite, which is used in power generation. Increased demand in China has made that country into a net importer of the fuel, mostly from Vietnam, another major producer of anthracite for power generation, although increasing domestic consumption in Vietnam means that exports may be scaled back.

Current U.S. anthracite production averages around five million tons per year. Of that, about 1.8 million tons were mined in the state of Pennsylvania. Mining of anthracite coal continues to this day in eastern Pennsylvania, and contributes up to 1% to the gross state product. More than 2,000 people were employed in the mining of anthracite coal in 1995. Most of the mining as of that date involved reclaiming coal from slag heaps (waste piles from past coal mining) at nearby closed mines. Some underground anthracite coal is also being mined.

Countries producing HG and UHG anthracite include Russia and South Africa. HG and UHG anthracite are used as a coke or coal substitute in various metallurgical coal applications (sintering, PCI, direct BF charge, pelletizing). It plays an important role in cost reduction in the steel making process and is also used in production of ferroalloys, silicomanganese, calcium carbide and silicon carbide. South Africa exports lower-quality, higher-ash anthracite to Brazil to be used in steel-making.

== Sizing and grading ==
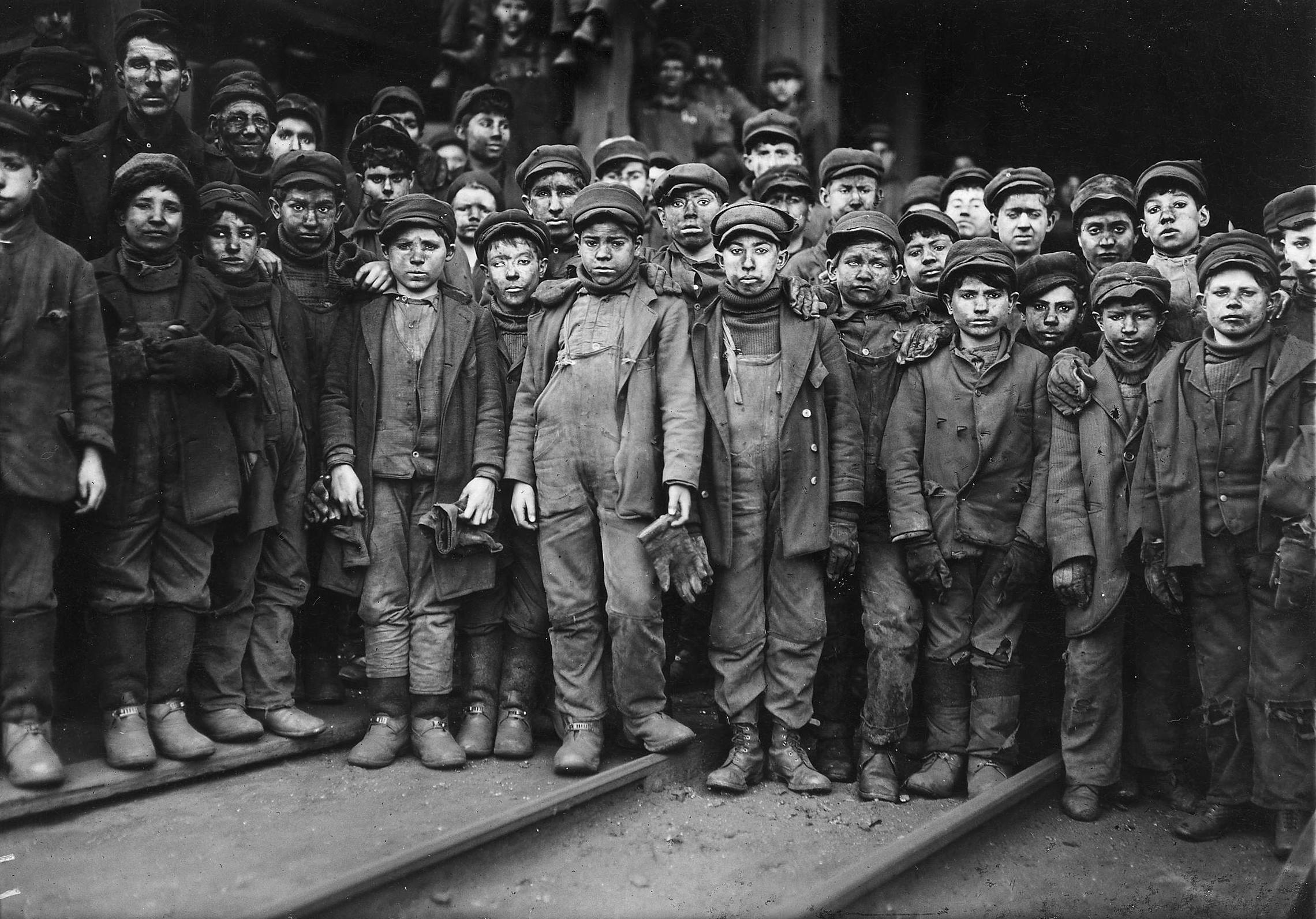
A photograph taken in 1908 by Lewis Hine of a group of breaker boys in Pittston, Pennsylvania

Anthracite is processed into different sizes by what is commonly referred to as a breaker. The large coal is raised from the mine and passed through breakers with toothed rolls to reduce the lumps to smaller pieces. The smaller pieces are separated into different sizes by a system of graduated sieves, placed in descending order. Sizing is necessary for different types of stoves and furnaces.

Anthracite is classified into three grades, depending on its carbon content. Standard grade is used as a domestic fuel and in industrial power-generation. The rarer higher grades of anthracite are purer – i.e., they have a higher carbon content – and are used in steel-making and other segments of the metallurgical industries. Technical characteristics of the various grades of anthracite are as follows:

	Standard grade anthracite	High grade anthracite	Ultra High grade anthracite	Coke
Moisture (maximum)	15%	15%	13%	5%
Ash (maximum)	20%	15%	12%	14%
Volatiles (maximum)	10%	10%	5%	2%
Fixed carbon (minimum)	73%	80%	85%	84%
Sulfur (maximum)	1%	1%	0.6%	0.8%

Anthracite is divided by size mainly into applications that need lumps (typically larger than 10 mm) – various industrial processes where it replaces metallurgical coke, and domestic fuel – and those that need fines (less than 10 mm), such as sintering and pelletising.

The common American classification by size is as follows:

Lump, steamboat, egg and stove coals, the latter in two or three sizes, all three being above 1 1/2 in (38 mm) size on round-hole screens.

=== High grade ===
High grade (HG) and ultra high grade (UHG) anthracite are the highest grades of anthracite coal. They are the purest forms of coal, having the highest degree of coalification, the highest carbon count and energy content and the fewest impurities (moisture, ash and volatiles).

High grade and ultra high grade anthracite are harder than standard grade anthracite, and have a higher relative density. An example of a chemical formula for high-grade anthracite would be C_{240}H_{90}O_{4}NS, representing 94% carbon. UHG anthracite typically has a minimum carbon content of 95%.

They also differ in usage from standard grade anthracite (used mainly for power generation), being employed mainly in metallurgy as a cost-efficient substitute for coke in processes such as sintering and pelletising, as well as pulverised coal injection (PCI) and direct injection into blast furnaces. They can also be used in water purification and domestically as a smokeless fuel.

HG and UHG anthracite account for a small percentage of the total anthracite market. The major producing countries are Russia, Ukraine, Vietnam, South Africa and the US.

Standard classifications by size
Name	Imperial (inches)	Metric (mm)
Chestnut	7/8–1 1/2 in	22–38 mm
Pea	9/16–7/8	14–22
Buckwheat	3/8–9/16	9.5–14.3
Rice	3/16–3/8	4.8–9.5
Barley	3/32–3/16	2.4–4.8

The primary sizes used in the United States for domestic heating are Chestnut, Pea, Buckwheat and Rice, with Chestnut and Rice being the most popular. Chestnut and Pea are used in hand fired furnaces while the smaller Rice and Buckwheat are used in automatic stoker furnaces. Rice is currently the most sought-after size due to the ease of use and popularity of that type of furnace.

In South Wales, a less elaborate classification is adopted, but great care is exercised in hand-picking and cleaning the coal from particles of pyrites in the higher qualities known as best malting coals, which are used for kiln-drying malt.

Anthracite dust can be made into briquettes and is sold in the United Kingdom under trade names such as Phurnacite, Ancit and Taybrite.

=== Semianthracite ===
On the opposite end from high-grade anthracite coal, semianthracite coal is defined as a coal which is intermediate between anthracite coal and bituminous coal, and particularly a coal which approaches anthracite in nonvolatile character.

== Underground fires ==
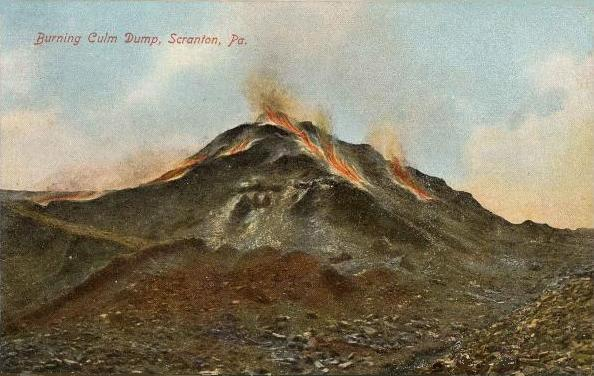
A 1908 postcard of burning anthracite near Scranton, Pennsylvania

Historically, from time to time, underground seams of coal have caught fire, often from careless or unfortunate mining activities. The pocket of ignited coal is fed oxygen by vent paths that have not yet been discovered. These can smolder for years. Commonly, exhaust vents in populated areas are soon sensed and are sealed while vents in uninhabited areas remain undiscovered. Occasionally, vents are discovered via fumes sensed by passers-by, often in forested areas. Attempts to extinguish those remaining have at times been futile, and several such combustion areas exist today. The existence of an underground combustion site can sometimes be identified in the winter where fallen snow is seen to be melted by the warmth conducted from below. Proposals for harnessing this heat as geothermal energy have not been successful.

A vein of anthracite that caught fire in Centralia, Pennsylvania, in 1962 has been burning ever since, turning the once-thriving borough into a ghost town.

== Major reserves ==
Geologically, the largest most concentrated anthracite deposit in the world is found in the Lackawanna Coal Mine in northeastern Pennsylvania, United States in and around Scranton, Pennsylvania. Locally called the Coal Region, the deposit contains 480 square miles (1,200 km^{2}) of coal-bearing rock which originally held 22.8 billion short tons (20.68 billion tonnes) of anthracite. The geographic region is roughly 100 miles (161 km) in length and 30 miles (48 km) in width. Because of historical mining and development of the lands overlying the coal, it is estimated that 7 billion short tons (6.3 billion tonnes) of minable reserves remain. Other areas of the United States also contain several smaller deposits of anthracite, such as those historically mined in Crested Butte, Colorado.

Among current producers, Russia, China, Poland, and Ukraine have the largest estimated recoverable reserves of anthracite. Other countries with substantial reserves include Vietnam and North Korea.

The Groundhog Anthracite Deposit in British Columbia, Canada, is the world's largest previously undeveloped anthracite deposit. It is owned by the Australian publicly traded company Atrum Coal and has 1.57 billion tonnes of high grade anthracite.

Anthracites of newer Tertiary or Cretaceous age are found in the Crowsnest Pass part of the Rocky Mountains in Canada and at various places in the Andes in Peru.

== See also ==
- Antratsyt – City in Luhansk Oblast, Ukraine, named after a large supply of anthracite found there
- Bituminous coal – Collective term for higher-quality coal, a softer coal
- History of coal miners
- History of coal mining
