= Casey Conway =

Australian rugby league footballer and male model

Personal information
- Citizenship: Australian
- Born: 31 January 1985 (age 41) Brisbane, Queensland, Australia
- Occupations: Former Head of Diversity and Inclusion at Rugby Australia

Casey Conway (born 1985) is an Australian of Aboriginal Australian descent. He was a semi-professional rugby league player. After he quit in 2005 due to a shoulder injury, he came out as gay. He speaks against the lack of acceptance in general of homosexuality in sports and is an advocate for young Indigenous Australians. He was also a male model for the Australian swimwear brand aussieBum.

== Early life and sporting career ==
Conway grew up in Bluff in Central Queensland as one of five boys. He went to boarding school in Yeppoon at St. Brendan's College, which had a specialised rugby league programme and is where he was discovered by Arthur Beetson for the National Rugby League team the Sydney Roosters.

Conway joined the Sydney Roosters' Jersey Flegg Cup team in 2003. At the time, he was still uncertain about his sexuality and was socialising covertly on Sydney's gay scene, where he has described facing "casual racism". After discussion with club officials, Conway decided not to come out – publicly or to his team-mates – until after leaving the club in 2005. His retirement at the age of 22 was the result of a shoulder injury.

== After retirement ==
After moving on from semi professional sport, and after a brief spell in fitness, Conway moved to work in youth work on Queensland's Gold Coast. He predominantly worked with young people that were disengaged from education as well as those within the youth justice and child protection systems.

In a 2015 interview with NITV when Conway did come out, he expressed disappointment that fellow Aboriginal boxing legend Anthony Mundine had claimed, two years previously, that homosexuality was not an acceptable part of Aboriginal culture. He did describe a perception of change in professional sport, however:

There's not too many [professional athletes] who have come forward, but I definitely think there's been a change. There are lots of different sporting identities, clubs and codes that are saying, "we're for equality". I think that's really great. It's really positive.

As well as youth work, Conway at one point was an Aboriginal male model. He has modelled for Australian swimwear brand aussieBum and Sluggers.

Conway was a board director and ambassador for the youth-led LGBTQ organization Wear It Purple and represented it at the 2021 Sydney Gay & Lesbian Mardi Gras.
