= Metallurgical coal =

Grade of coal

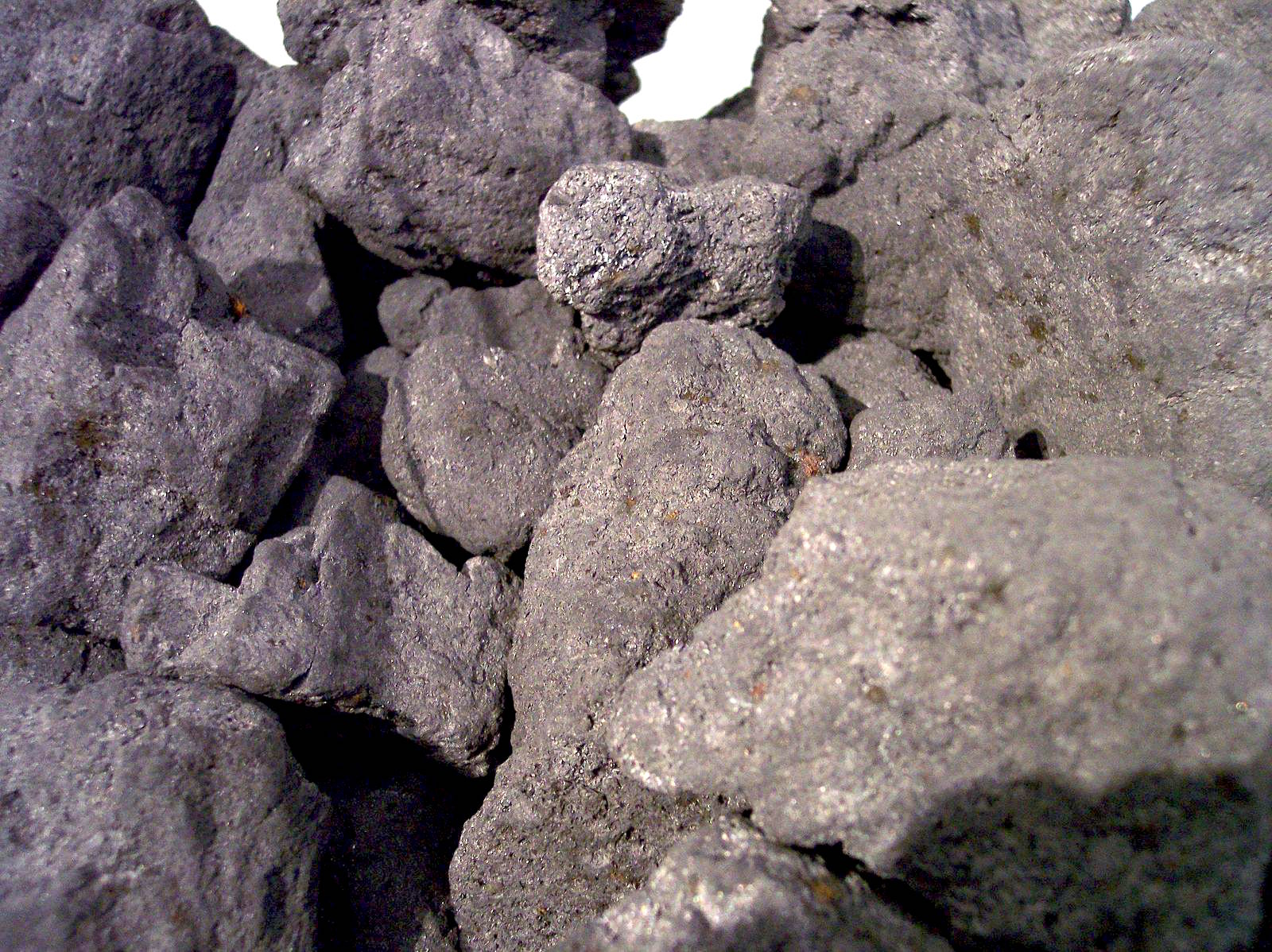
Raw coke

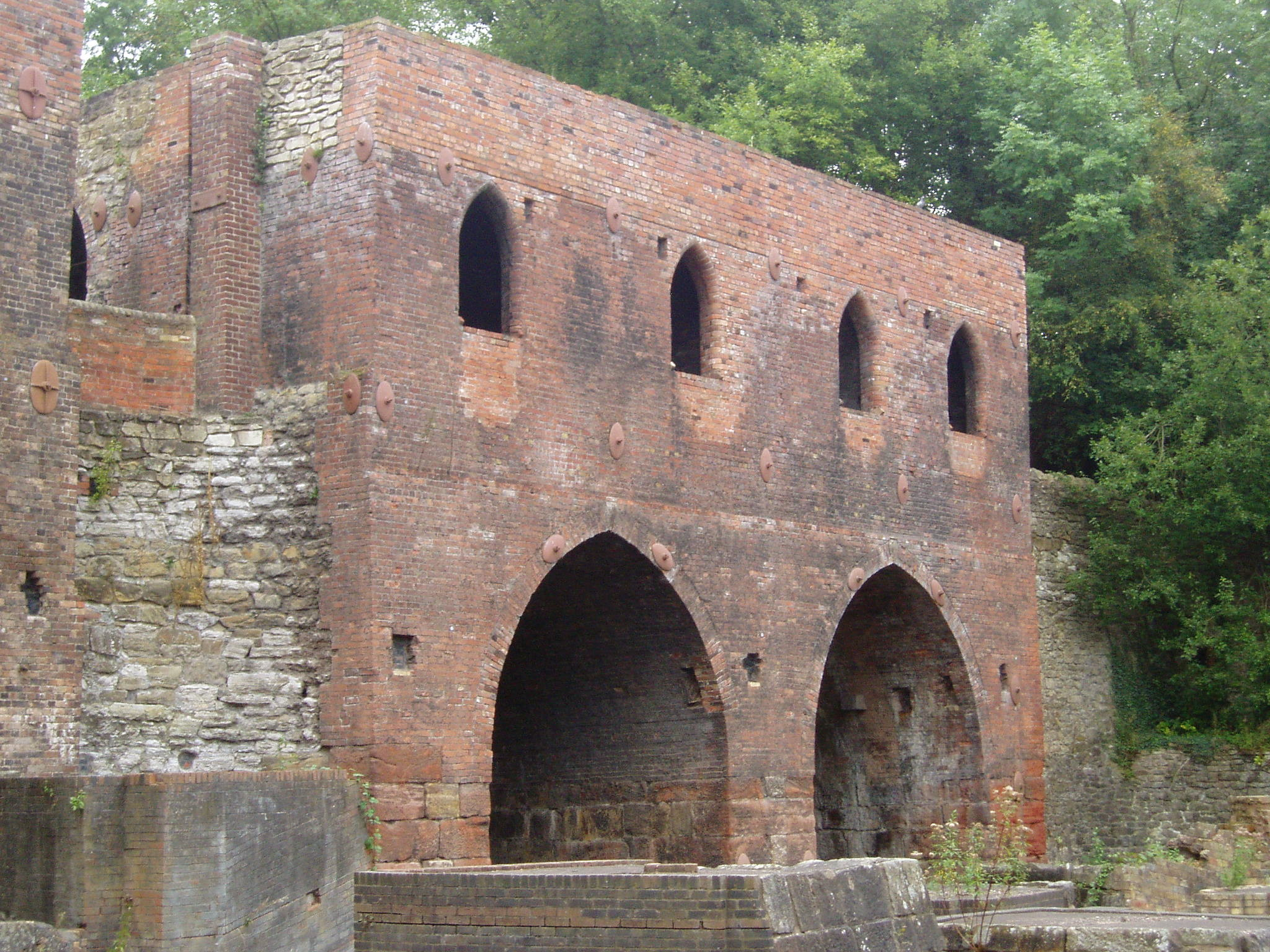
Eighteenth-century coke blast furnaces in Shropshire, England

Metallurgical coal or coking coal is a grade of coal that can be used to produce good-quality coke. Coke is an essential fuel and reactant in the blast furnace process for primary steelmaking. The demand for metallurgical coal is highly coupled to the demand for steel. Primary steelmaking companies often have a division that produces coal for coking, to ensure a stable and low-cost supply.

Metallurgical coal comes mainly from Canada, the United States, and Australia, with Australia exporting 58% of seaborne trade, mostly going to China. In the United States, the electric power sector used "93% of total U.S. coal consumption between 2007 and 2018"; only 7% of the total was metallurgical coal and coal for other uses such as heating.

== Characteristics ==
Metallurgical coal is low in ash, moisture, sulfur and phosphorus content, and its rank is usually bituminous. Some grades of anthracite coal are used for sintering, pulverized coal injection, direct blast furnace charge, pelletizing, and in production of ferro-alloys, silicon-manganese, calcium-carbide and silicon-carbide. Metallurgical coal produces strong, low-density coke when it is heated in a low-oxygen environment. On heating, the coal softens, and volatile components evaporate and escape through pores in the mass. During coking, the material swells and increases in volume.

The coking ability of coal is related to its physical properties such as its rank, but laboratory testing is required to completely evaluate the coking ability of a coal. The strength and density of coke are particularly important when it is used in a blast furnace, as the coke supports part of the ore and flux burden inside the furnace. Metallurgical coal contrasts with thermal coal, which does not produce coke when heated. Because of their different end-uses, prices for the two types of coal are usually quite different.

The suitability of coal for conversion to coke is also referred to as the caking ability.

== Types ==
There are several types of metallurgical coal:

- Hard coking coals (HCC)
- Medium coking coal (MCC)
- Semi-soft coking coal (SSCC)
- Pulverized coal for injection (PCI) coal

== See also ==
- Coal § Coke
- Metallurgy
- Coal analysis
- Lignite
