= Blackwater Airport =

Airport in Queensland, Australia

- IATA: BLT; ICAO: YBTR

Summary
- Airport type: Public
- Operator: BHP Mitsubishi Alliance
- Location: Blackwater, Queensland, Australia
- Elevation AMSL: 657 ft / 200 m
- Coordinates: 23°36′11″S 148°48′25″E

Map
- Location in Queensland

Runways
| Direction | Length | | Surface |
| Direction | m | ft | Surface |
|---|---|---|---|
| 18/36 | 1,163 | 3,816 | Asphalt |
- Sources: Australian AIP and aerodrome chart

Blackwater Airport (IATA: BLT, ICAO: YBTR) is an airport in Blackwater, Queensland, Australia.

As of 16 August 2010, all commercial services to and from Blackwater ceased operations due to poor patronage. QantasLink was the only scheduled operator at the time with daily flights to Brisbane, with some services operating via Emerald. However, the airport would remain open to emergency medical users such as the Royal Flying Doctor Service.

== See also ==
- List of airports in Queensland
