= Junee National Park =

National park in Queensland, Australia

- Location within Queensland
- Location: Queensland
- Nearest city: Middlemount
- Coordinates: 22°45′S 148°59′E
- Area: 5,400 ha (21 sq mi)
- Established: 2000
- Governing body: Queensland Parks and Wildlife Service

Junee National Park is a national park in Queensland, Australia, 30 km east of Middlemount.

== See also ==
- Protected areas of Queensland
