= Mitchell Burns =

Australian photographer, social media influencer, and former miner

- Born: Mareeba
- Occupations: Photographer, influencer, former miner

Mitchell Burns is an Australian photographer, social media influencer, and former miner. After growing up as a coal miner, he became a full-time photographer in 2022. He released his memoir, Life, Camera, Action, in 2024.

== Biography ==
Burns was born in Mareeba and raised in the tiny mining town of Bluff, Queensland, where, according to him, it was assumed that you would become a coal miner, and life revolved around it. He is of Sicilian heritage. At the age of seven, he got a disposable camera, and began photographing things around him. He won a local competition for his photography. After graduating high school, he began working fly-in fly-out mining work, but soon noticed his mental health began to suffer.

After missing out on a permanent role in mining, he decided to switch to becoming a full-time photographer in 2022. By December 2025, he had more than 900,000 followers on social media. He has emphasized demonstrating and promoting wildlife protection, including how people can get involved to help injured wildlife. He also posts thirst traps.

Some notable shots he's taken include a helicopter shot of the Great Barrier Reef and a shot of Uluru in the rain, as well as a shot of Rigby Falls near Mount Isa. His best-known social media reel, made on Christmas Day 2022, is one of him demonstrating the extraction of secretions from shampoo ginger, which can be used as a natural shampoo. He subsequently described the plant as "very phallic". According to The Australian, he has been described as a "younger and hunkier David Attenborough".

In September 2024, he published his memoir, Life, Camera, Action. It was published by Simon & Schuster Australia. He subsequently went on a book tour.

He has collaborated with nonprofit Odonata Foundation to photograph animals and promote support of endangered animals. He has also collaborated with Nautica to promote their men's red cologne. He has stated his goal is to open his own gallery and create his own TV show.
