= Wayne Denning =

Australian First Nations business owner

Wayne Denning is an Indigenous Australian businessman of Birri Gubba heritage, and is the Managing Director and owner of Carbon Creative.

== Personal life ==
Denning grew up as part of the Birri Gubba First Nations community (also known as Blackwater) in the Central Highlands Region of Queensland, Australia. His sister is Tanya Denning-Orman, the Director of Indigenous Content at SBS Australia, and Channel Manager of NITV.

== Education ==
Denning received a Bachelor of Arts specialising in sociology, psychology and political geography from Central Queensland University in 1992, and an MBA from Queensland University of Technology in 2006.

== Career ==
Denning established creative agency Carbon Media (later renamed Carbon Creative) "around a kitchen table in 2006" to showcase the arts and culture of Australia's Aboriginal and Torres Strait Islander people, and to create more positive representation of First Nations people in the Australian mainstream media. Denning stated that while Carbon Media was founded as a for-profit business to ensure ongoing viability, it was established with "a philosophy of social entrepreneurship", and the intent of giving back to the First Nations community of Australia.

Along with his sister Tanya Denning-Orman, he was part of the team that launched NITV in 2007.

In 2017, Denning established the STEM.I.Am program with Geek Girl Academy that seeks to promote science, technology, engineering and mathematics programs to Indigenous children.

He was the winner of the 2017 Indigenous Digital Excellence Award in the category of Learnings and Education, presented by the National Centre of Indigenous Excellence, and Queensland University of Technology recognised him with an Outstanding Alumni Award for Special Excellence Award for Achievements and Contributions to Indigenous Communities.

Also in 2017, Denning was interviewed as part of the State Library of Queensland's Game Changers series, a Queensland Business Leaders Hall of Fame initiative presented in partnership with QUT Business School and the Queensland Library Foundation.

He was featured in the Magnificent Makers exhibition at the State Library of Queensland in 2018.

He was the Deputy Chair of the Board of the National Film and Sound Archive of Australia from 2011 to 2021.

He was named one of Australia's top 100 innovators by The Australian in 2021.
