= Bowengriphus =

Bowengriphus Temporal range: Late Permian

Scientific classification
- Kingdom: Animalia
- Phylum: incertae sedis
- Genus: †Bowengriphus; Ritchie & Edgecome, 2001
- Species: †B. perphlegis

Binomial name
- †Bowengriphus perphlegis Ritchie & Edgecome, 2001

Extinct genus of freshwater organisms

Bowengriphus is a freshwater organism known from Late Permian deposits in Rangal Coal Measures of eastern central Queensland, Australia

It was originally interpreted as a relative of Odontogriphus, but a re-analysis of this fossil discounted any relationship, placing the fossil as incertae sedis.

It is a small (≈15 cm), elongate, soft-bodied bilaterian as the body is bilaterally symmetrical, with a rounded anterior region and a tapering posterior. Its most distinctive feature is a double-looped feeding apparatus with paired rows of conical elements, integrated into the anterior region. No segmentation, limbs, or mineralized skeleton are present. The fossil shows a single, continuous body plan without evidence of separate appendages or external armor.
