= Blackwater, Queensland =

Blackwater
- Town
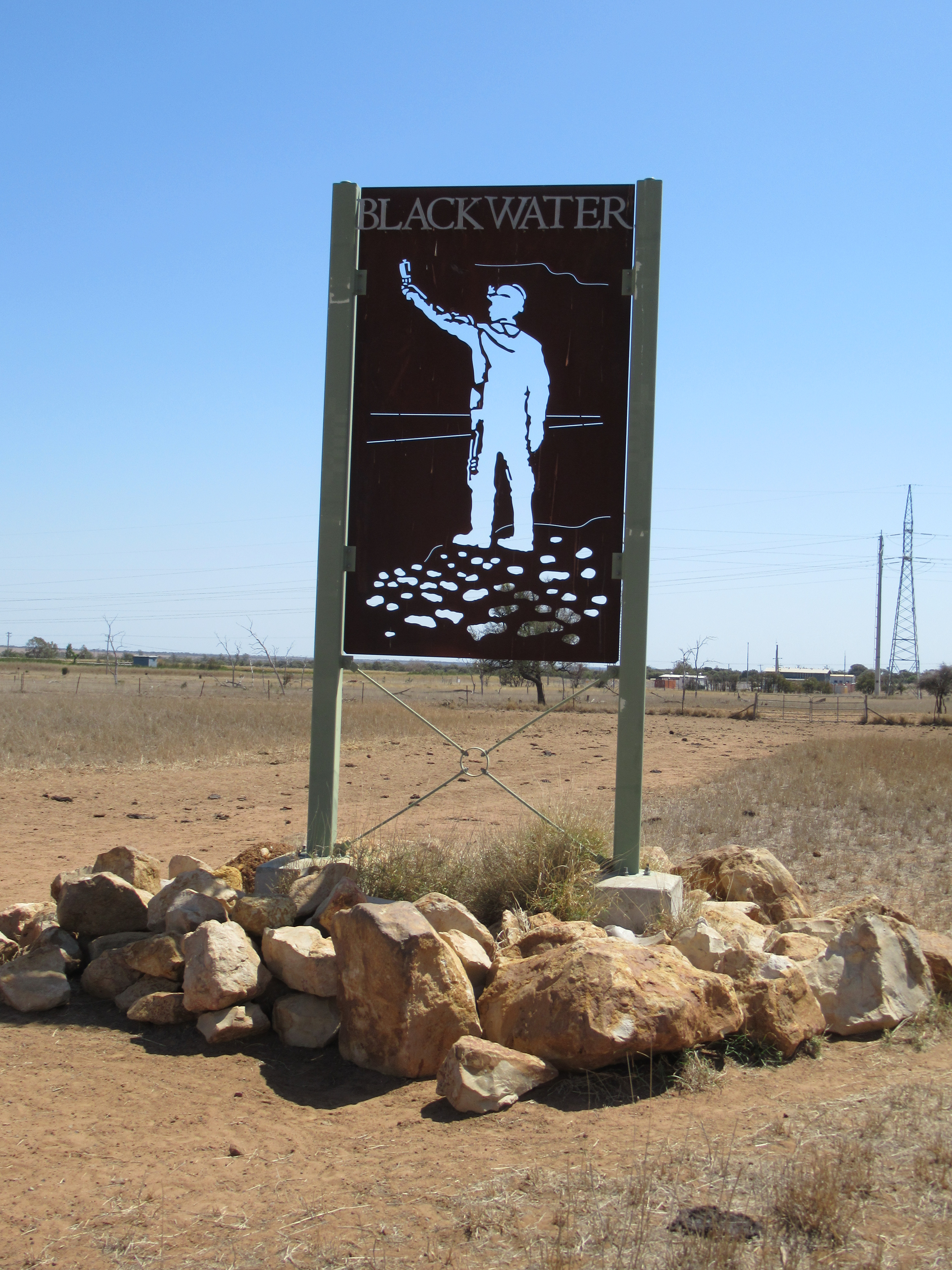
- Sign at the entrance to Blackwater, 2018

- Interactive map of Blackwater
- Coordinates: 23.5758°S 148.8869°E
- Country: Australia
- State: Queensland
- LGA: Central Highlands Region
- Location: 76 km (47 mi) E of Emerald; 196 km (122 mi) W of Rockhampton; 799 km (496 mi) NNW of Brisbane

Government
  - State electorate: Gregory
  - Federal division: Flynn

Area
  - Total: 656.8 km^{2} (253.6 sq mi)
- Elevation: 193 m (633 ft)

Population
  - Total: 4,702 (2021 census)
  - Density: 7.1590/km^{2} (18.542/sq mi)
- Time zone: UTC+10:00 (AEST)
- Postcode: 4717
- Mean max temp: 30.4 °C (86.7 °F)
- Mean min temp: 16.3 °C (61.3 °F)
- Annual rainfall: 524.2 mm (20.64 in)
Localities around Blackwater
Mackenzie River	Mackenzie River	Jellinbah
Mackenzie River	Blackwater	Bluff
Comet	Stewarton	Stewarton

Blackwater is a rural town and locality in the Central Highlands Region, Queensland, Australia. It is within a significant coal mining area in Central Queensland. The name of the township was inspired by the dark colour of local waterholes. In the 2021 census, the locality of Blackwater had a population of 4,702 people.

== Geography ==
Six major open cut coal mines and one underground dot the landscape surrounding the town and provide its main employment opportunities. The town is also situated close to the Blackdown Tableland National Park which lies to the southeast and Blackwater coal mine located south of the town. Emerald is 74 kilometres (46 mi) to the west.

Bonnie Doon is a neighbourhood in the centre of the locality (23.5°S 148.8166°E) and is associated with the Bonnie Doon pastoral station established in 1893.

Rangal, a neighbourhood in the locality (23.5833°S 148.8166°E), is associated with former Rangal railway station (originally called Frasers Siding), assigned by the Queensland Railways Department on 7 June 1927. It is an Aboriginal word referring to a species of Callistemon (ti tree), although the language of origin is unknown.

=== Climate ===
Blackwater has a subtropical semi-arid climate (Köppen: BSh) with very hot, somewhat wetter summers and very mild, dry winters. On average, the town experiences 92.3 clear days and 82.4 cloudy days per annum. The wettest recorded day was 30 March 2017 with 123.6 mm (4.87 in) of rainfall. Extreme temperatures ranged from 43.7 °C (110.7 °F) on 4 January 2014 to −0.6 °C (30.9 °F) on 12 July 2014.

The Water Treatment Plant had a weather station. It recorded temperature, precipitation, 9 am and 3 pm conditions from 1995 to 2010.

Climate data for Blackwater Water Treatment Plant (23.60°S 148.87°E) (187 m (614 ft) AMSL) (1995–2010)
Month	Jan	Feb	Mar	Apr	May	Jun	Jul	Aug	Sep	Oct	Nov	Dec	Year
Record high °C (°F)	42.0 (107.6)	42.0 (107.6)	41.5 (106.7)	36.5 (97.7)	34.2 (93.6)	31.5 (88.7)	28.6 (83.5)	32.0 (89.6)	37.4 (99.3)	41.8 (107.2)	40.5 (104.9)	43.4 (110.1)	43.4 (110.1)
Mean daily maximum °C (°F)	34.1 (93.4)	33.3 (91.9)	32.6 (90.7)	29.9 (85.8)	26.5 (79.7)	23.6 (74.5)	23.4 (74.1)	24.9 (76.8)	29.0 (84.2)	31.7 (89.1)	32.4 (90.3)	34.1 (93.4)	29.6 (85.3)
Mean daily minimum °C (°F)	22.4 (72.3)	22.3 (72.1)	20.8 (69.4)	17.9 (64.2)	13.1 (55.6)	10.7 (51.3)	8.5 (47.3)	10.6 (51.1)	14.1 (57.4)	17.8 (64.0)	19.5 (67.1)	21.6 (70.9)	16.6 (61.9)
Record low °C (°F)	16.8 (62.2)	15.0 (59.0)	12.5 (54.5)	4.2 (39.6)	2.7 (36.9)	2.4 (36.3)	1.1 (34.0)	1.5 (34.7)	3.1 (37.6)	8.8 (47.8)	9.5 (49.1)	14.8 (58.6)	1.1 (34.0)
Average precipitation mm (inches)	68.5 (2.70)	78.8 (3.10)	30.5 (1.20)	28.6 (1.13)	21.4 (0.84)	42.1 (1.66)	15.1 (0.59)	25.9 (1.02)	19.3 (0.76)	66.0 (2.60)	66.3 (2.61)	79.5 (3.13)	546.2 (21.50)
Average precipitation days (≥ 0.2 mm)	8.5	7.1	4.0	3.8	3.0	4.1	2.4	2.8	2.6	5.2	6.8	7.3	57.6
Average afternoon relative humidity (%)	45	48	41	41	39	45	37	35	30	33	37	39	39
Average dew point °C (°F)	18.2 (64.8)	18.3 (64.9)	15.8 (60.4)	12.8 (55.0)	9.7 (49.5)	8.5 (47.3)	6.0 (42.8)	6.7 (44.1)	7.3 (45.1)	11.1 (52.0)	13.4 (56.1)	15.7 (60.3)	12.0 (53.5)
Source: Bureau of Meteorology (1995–2010)

A weather station at the town's airport opened in 2013. It records temperature and precipitation data.

Climate data for Blackwater Airport (23.60°S 148.81°E) (193 m (633 ft) AMSL) (2013–2025)
Month	Jan	Feb	Mar	Apr	May	Jun	Jul	Aug	Sep	Oct	Nov	Dec	Year
Record high °C (°F)	43.7 (110.7)	42.7 (108.9)	41.8 (107.2)	35.5 (95.9)	33.1 (91.6)	31.4 (88.5)	31.2 (88.2)	33.2 (91.8)	40.5 (104.9)	40.5 (104.9)	42.2 (108.0)	43.3 (109.9)	43.7 (110.7)
Mean daily maximum °C (°F)	34.6 (94.3)	34.3 (93.7)	33.2 (91.8)	30.3 (86.5)	27.0 (80.6)	24.2 (75.6)	24.0 (75.2)	26.2 (79.2)	29.5 (85.1)	32.6 (90.7)	34.0 (93.2)	34.8 (94.6)	30.4 (86.7)
Mean daily minimum °C (°F)	22.0 (71.6)	21.7 (71.1)	21.0 (69.8)	16.9 (62.4)	13.2 (55.8)	10.2 (50.4)	9.3 (48.7)	10.0 (50.0)	13.4 (56.1)	17.3 (63.1)	19.4 (66.9)	21.0 (69.8)	16.3 (61.3)
Record low °C (°F)	16.9 (62.4)	16.1 (61.0)	15.0 (59.0)	6.7 (44.1)	2.9 (37.2)	−0.2 (31.6)	−0.6 (30.9)	1.2 (34.2)	4.3 (39.7)	7.2 (45.0)	11.7 (53.1)	13.1 (55.6)	−0.6 (30.9)
Average precipitation mm (inches)	92.3 (3.63)	73.1 (2.88)	65.6 (2.58)	19.7 (0.78)	21.0 (0.83)	19.0 (0.75)	29.9 (1.18)	18.4 (0.72)	17.5 (0.69)	50.3 (1.98)	51.0 (2.01)	72.6 (2.86)	524.2 (20.64)
Average precipitation days (≥ 0.2 mm)	8.5	7.9	6.8	3.5	3.0	3.8	3.8	2.6	2.6	5.0	7.2	6.9	61.6
Source: Bureau of Meteorology (2013–2025)

== History ==
Blackwater was established on Gangulu territory, and is named after the Blackwater Creek which apparently was first observed to flow with black water, believed to be caused by the local coal deposits.

Coal deposits were discovered there by Ludwig Leichhardt on his expedition from Moreton Bay to Port Essington (now Darwin, Northern Territory) in 1845. Leichhardt saw "beds of coal indistinguishable from those on the Hunter at Newcastle".

Blackwater Post Office opened on 19 July 1877.

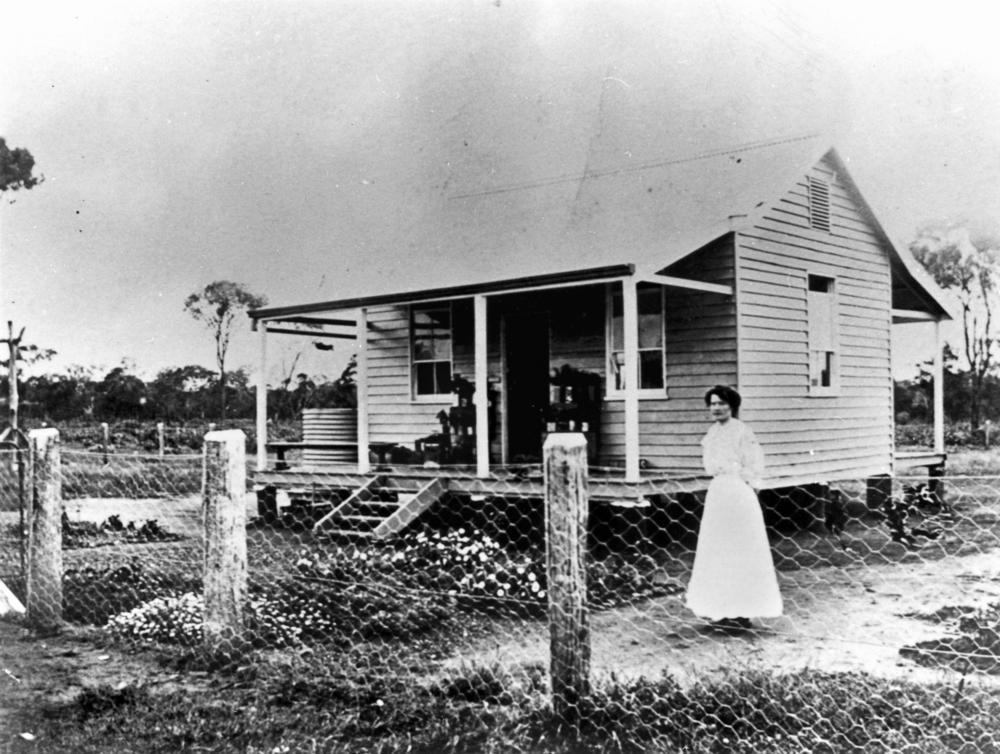
Blackwater State School ca.1900

Blackwater Provisional School opened on 21 November 1877 but closed sometime after September 1878. It reopened in 1883 and on 1 January 1909 became Blackwater State School.

It wasn't until over a century after Leichhardt first discovered the beds of coal at Blackwater that the town saw major coal mining development. With the opening up of several coal mines near the town in the 1960s, Blackwater's population rapidly increased as people searching for work found employment in the town's booming mining industry.

Blackwater State High School opened on 30 January 1973.

By the mid-late 1970s, the town had 3 Rugby League clubs: South Blackwater, Blackwater Devils and Blackwater Centrals.

Blackwater North State School opened on 30 January 1979.

Approximately 100,000 workers have been employed in coal mining at Blackwater over its 50-year history. The town has provided considerable economic development for Queensland and Australia more generally.

=== 1867 Gold Escort murders ===
Blackwater is located close to the site of the infamous double murder of two police constables at the hands of gold commissioner Thomas Griffin.

Griffin killed the two troopers, John Power and Patrick Cahill, on 6 November 1867 on the banks of the Mackenzie River near the present day site of Blackwater's Bedford Weir, which is located approximately 25 kilometres north of the town. The three men had been a part of a gold escort, escorting £4000 in cash from Rockhampton to the Clermont goldfields, which Griffin stole after he killed Power and Cahill. Griffin was later convicted of the crime and hanged in Rockhampton.

A memorial to Power and Cahill was erected at the Bedford Weir in 2013. The 150th anniversary of their murders, in 2017, was commemorated in both Blackwater and Rockhampton.

=== 1980 John Howard visit ===
Blackwater attracted national media attention in 1980 after violent scenes occurred outside the Capricorn Hotel on 1 August 1980, when angry striking coal miners confronted Federal Treasurer, John Howard.

Howard had arrived in Blackwater with Deputy Prime Minister, Doug Anthony, and Queensland Treasurer, Llewellyn Edwards, to negotiate with union officials in an attempt to end the protracted industrial action. The strike by the miners was in protest against a government plan to make coal miners pay tax on housing subsidised by the mining companies.

The miners, who had been supplied with free alcohol, confronted the politicians as they left the hotel after negotiations reached a stalemate. As police officers attempted to hastily escort the politicians to the safety of waiting police vehicles, Howard was shoved, jostled, sworn at and grabbed in a headlock. A police officer sustained a suspected broken nose, a camera operator was punched in the face and eggs were thrown. A police vehicle was also damaged when its tail light was kicked in.

The 10-week strike ended in September 1980 when the Federal Government eventually reached an agreement with the Combined Mining Unions.

=== 1999 Australian Story controversy ===
In 1999, a production crew from ABC Television's documentary series Australian Story arrived in Blackwater to film jazz musician Don Burrows' visit to the town. Burrows had already visited Blackwater on two previous occasions. On this occasion Burrows performed a concert in the town with pianist Kevin Hunt and briefly spent time with members of Blackwater State High School's concert band. The Australian Story program, entitled "Mr Burrows goes to Blackwater" and introduced by Julie Anthony, aired on 29 July 1999.

The Blackwater community's reception to the program was mostly negative. Complaints ranged from the way Blackwater was portrayed in the program, to the way the program implied that Burrows was single-handedly responsible for the success of the high school band when in actuality he had only played a very minor role. Principal of Blackwater State High School, Jim Reay, said he was disappointed with the program, particularly by the failure of the program to acknowledge the contribution of bandmaster and music teacher John Evenhuis. It was also a sentiment shared by many local residents who felt that Evenhuis had achieved much more than Burrows regarding the success of the concert band and was more deserving of the praise which had been afforded to Burrows.

The substantial negative reaction prompted Australian Story producer John Millard to write a lengthy open letter to the Blackwater community which was published in local newspaper, the Blackwater Herald, in an attempt to explain why the program was produced the way it was.

=== 2008 Bedford Weir fabridam failure ===
On 23 November 2008, a fabridam barrier at the Bedford Weir on the Mackenzie River near Blackwater suddenly failed, causing 6,000 megalitres of water to surge downstream into a popular recreational area where people were swimming. A four year old girl, Nelani Koefer, who had been paddling in shallow water, was washed away and drowned. Her body was recovered the following day.

The Bedford Weir's operator SunWater Limited and the manufacturer of the fabridam wall, Trelleborg Engineered Systems, were held responsible for the failure. In 2013, SunWater pleaded guilty to a breach of the Workplace Health & Safety Act in the Rockhampton Industrial Magistrates Court and was fined $80,000, but no conviction was recorded. Trelleborg Engineered Systems was also fined $80,000.

A coronial inquest was held in 2015, the findings of which were delivered on 17 March 2016. The coroner found that the collapse had been caused by a manufacturing fault in the wall, which had been designed by Trelleborg. The coroner advised that the walls should be removed, never to be used again.

In 2016, it was reported that Nelani Koefer's mother had filed a claim in the Rockhampton Supreme Court suing SunWater and Trelleborg for $1.48 million.

=== 2020 COVID-19 scares ===
In 2020, it was feared that the Blackwater community was potentially exposed to COVID-19 during the COVID-19 pandemic in Australia after it was confirmed on two separate occasions that there had been positive COVID-19 test results. On both occasions it was confirmed the initial test results had been false positives.

In the first incident, it was reported on 11 April 2020 that a Rockhampton-based worker employed at BHP's BMA coal mine at Blackwater had tested positive to COVID-19. The positive result prompted BHP to contact people who may have been in contact with the employee who had not been on site since 1 April 2020. However, several days later the Central Queensland Hospital and Health Service confirmed that the man had tested negative to COVID-19 following a secondary test and that the first test had been a false positive.

In the second incident, it was confirmed on 27 May 2020 by the Queensland Government that 30-year-old mine worker Nathan Turner had died at his Blackwater home and had subsequently tested positive to COVID-19. At the time, Turner was believed to have been the youngest person in Australia to have died from COVID-19, a fact that generated significant national media interest.

Following the announcement, a special COVID-19 response team was dispatched to Blackwater and many of the town's residents came forward to be tested. Blackwater's sewerage was also tested in an attempt to determine whether the virus had spread through the community. There were also fears that they may have been a link between Turner and a Rockhampton aged care nurse who had earlier travelled to Blackwater while infectious with COVID-19.

Several days after they had said that Turner had died from COVID-19, the Queensland Government revealed that the coroner had advised them that Turner did not have COVID-19 and that the initial test may have been a false positive.

The revelation that Turner did not have COVID-19 sparked anger in the Blackwater community. It also prompted almost 10,000 people to sign a petition on Change.org demanding Queensland Premier Annastacia Palaszczuk and Chief Health Officer Jeannette Young apologise to Turner's family. Palaszczuk and Deputy Premier Steven Miles both publicly apologised to Turner's family while Young said she believed nothing could have been done differently and was confident the correct actions were taken to protect the Blackwater community following the initial positive test result.

There was also criticism that news of Turner's false positive was first revealed on social media by his partner's workplace rather than Queensland Health, who only confirmed the news several hour afterwards. The government's actions, however, received support from Turner's father who said although he didn't understand how a false positive had occurred, he understood that the potential risk required immediate action and that the public needed to be informed.

== Demographics ==
There were 77 people living in Blackwater when the 1961 census was recorded. This increased to almost 2,000 when the 1971 census was recorded.

By the mid-late 1970s, the population of Blackwater was more than 10,000 people.

6,760 people living in Blackwater in 1991. Since then, the population of the town has gradually waned. In the 2011 census, there were still over 5,000 people living in the Blackwater community.

In the 2016 census, the locality of Blackwater had a population of 4,749 people.

In the 2021 census, the locality of Blackwater had a population of 4,702 people.

== Education ==
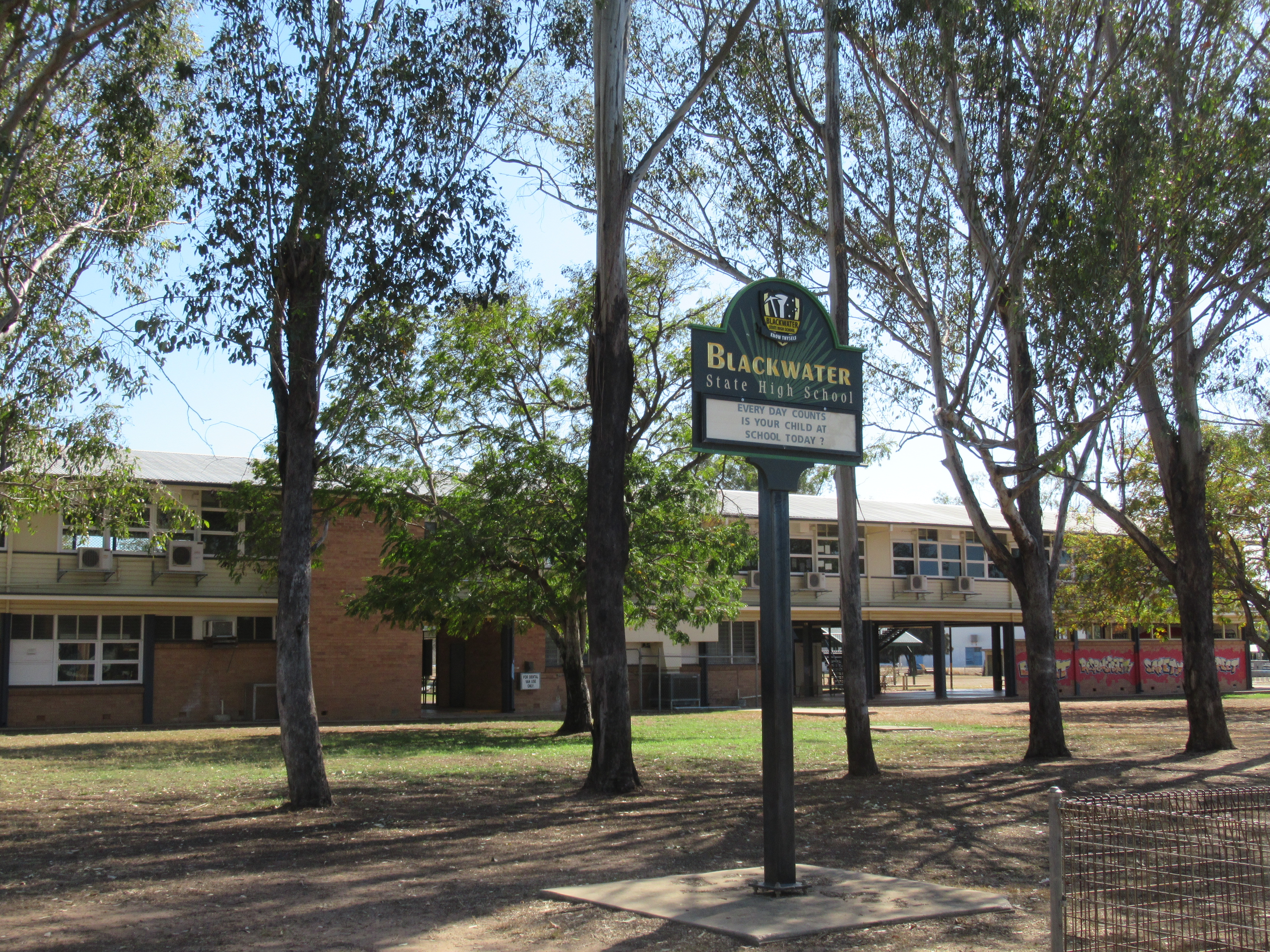
Blackwater State High School, 2018

Blackwater State School is a government primary (Prep–6) school for boys and girls at 11 Wey Street (23.5834°S 148.8778°E). In 2017, the school had an enrolment of 183 students with 14 teachers and 18 non-teaching staff (10 full-time equivalent).

Blackwater North State School is a government primary (Early Childhood to Year 6) school for boys and girls at 20 Park Street (corner of William Street, 23.5662°S 148.8864°E). In 2017, the school had an enrolment of 397 students with 27 teachers (26 full-time equivalent) and 19 non-teaching staff (13 full-time equivalent). It includes a special education program.

Blackwater State High School is a government secondary (7–12) school for boys and girls at 26 Elm Street (23.5724°S 148.8827°E). In 2017, the school had an enrolment of 316 students with 36 teachers (35 full-time equivalent) and 24 non-teaching staff (17 full-time equivalent). It includes a special education program.

== Amenities ==
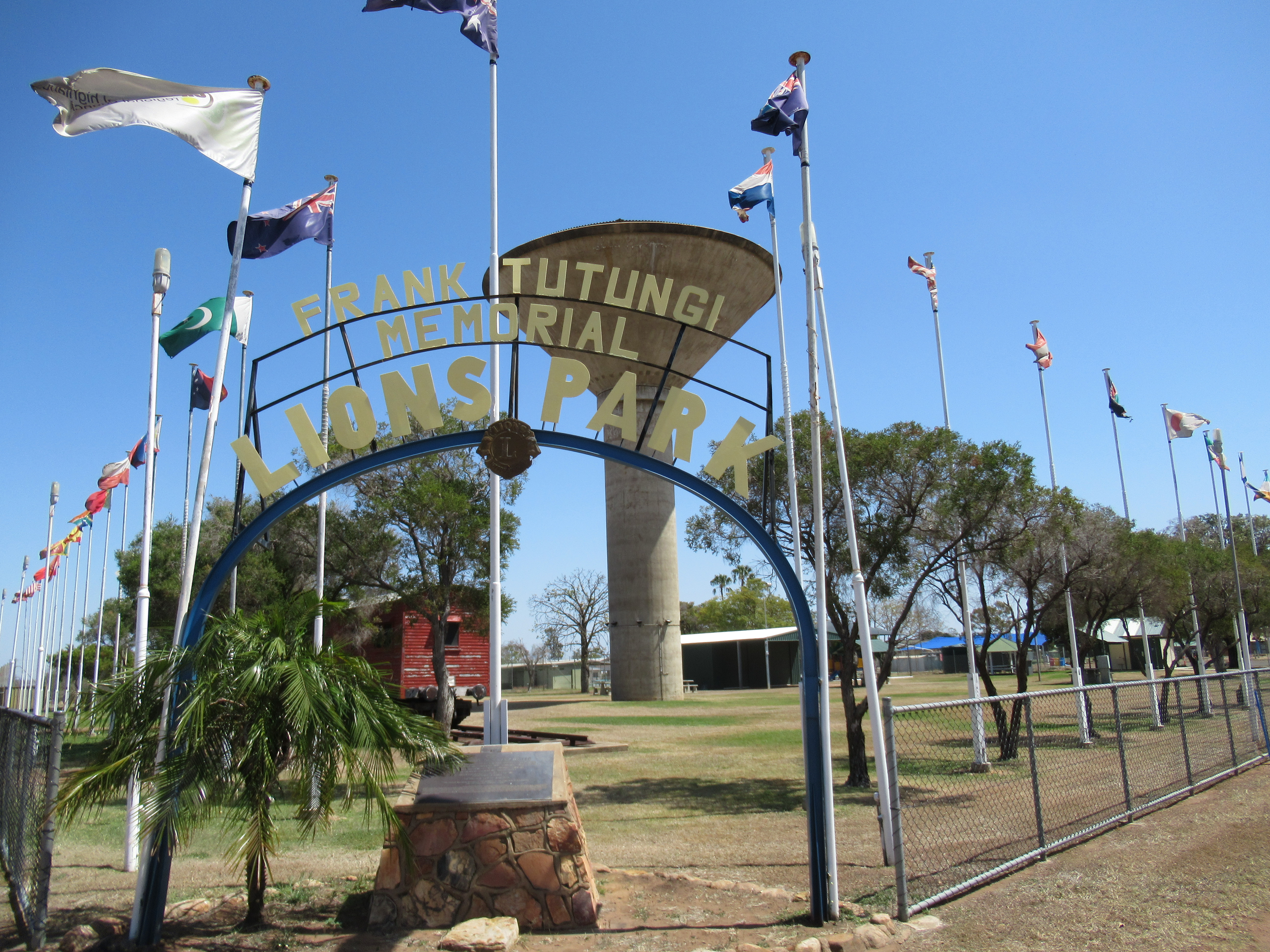
Frank Tutungi Memorial Lions Park, 2018

The Central Highlands Regional Council Library Services operates a Library in Blackwater at the Community Centre on Wey Street.

Frank Tutungi Memorial Lions Park is on the corner of the Capricorn Highway and Mackenzie Street. It is named after one of the Blackwater Lions Charter Members, Frank Tutungi, who was one of the original members of the Blackwater Lions Club and was the first from Blackwater to become a District Governor. The park displays the flags of the 37 nationalities of the people who formed part of the original town.

The Blackwater branch of the Queensland Country Women's Association meets at the QCWA Hall at 1 Ardurad Road.

Blackwater Uniting Church is at 1 Coolibah Street (23.5820°S 148.8787°E). It is part of the Central Queensland Presbytery.

== Fossils ==
Discoveries in the Blackwater region include Bowengriphus, and Ebenaqua.

== Notable people from Blackwater ==
Olympic track cyclist Anna Meares was born in Blackwater in 1983. In 2012, a street was named after her, when Meares Street was constructed as part of a new subdivision in the centre of Blackwater.

Australian television personality, actor and comedian Josh Thomas was born in Blackwater in 1987, but moved with his family to Brisbane soon after.

Australian rugby league players Tamika Upton, PJ Marsh and David Taylor all grew up in Blackwater. They have represented various teams in the National Rugby League competition.

Wayne Denning, who established the award-winning creative agency Carbon Creative, was born in Blackwater.

== See also ==
- Blackwater Airport
- Blackwater railway system
- Coal in Australia
