= Carbon Creative =

Australian creative agency

Carbon Creative is an Indigenous-owned creative agency based in Brisbane, Australia. The agency was founded in 2006 and produces creative content "to help close the gap between Indigenous and non-Indigenous people" of Australia, shift perceptions of Indigenous communities that centre around negative stereotypes and economic and social disadvantage, and increase representation of First Nations Australians within Australian society.

== History ==
The agency was founded "around a kitchen table in 2006" by Wayne Denning under the name Carbon Media to showcase the arts and culture of Australia's Aboriginal and Torres Strait Islander people, and to create more positive representation of First Nations people in the Australian mainstream media. Denning stated that while Carbon Media was founded as a for-profit business to ensure ongoing viability, it was established with "a philosophy of social entrepreneurship", and the intent of giving back to the First Nations community of Australia.

In 2006, the agency created Australia's first Indigenous children's television series, Letterbox, which was released through ABC3 and NITV. The show was produced to help improve spelling and literacy, and provide positive indigenous role models amongst First Nations children.

In 2010, Carbon Media was a finalist in the Lord Mayor's Brisbane Business Awards.

In 2013, Carbon Media was one of four companies that received a portion of US$2.2million in funding as part of Screen Australia's 2013 Enterprise program that supports Australian content producers.

== Cultural impact ==
In 2013, Carbon Creative became the first Australian production company to work with Children's Television Workshop program Sesame Street. Starring First Nations musician Jessica Mauboy, "5 Kangaroos" has been broadcast to over 780 million people in over 140 countries. The song clip debuted in January 2014 in the US, and was screened in Australia in March of the same year. Part of a segment titled Cookie's Crumby Pictures that seeks to teach children to count using kangaroos and boomerangs as visual tools, "5 Kangaroos" was the first Australian song—and the first Indigenous Australian song—to be included on Sesame Street, and features children from Yipirinya State Primary School in Alice Springs in the Northern Territory.

Carbon Creative partnered with SBS's Internal Education Services to produce SBS's online course on Aboriginal and Torres Strait Islander inclusion. It is one of several modules designed to educate Australian students and workers to create more inclusive Australian workplaces.

Carbon Creative are advocates for the growth of First Nations-owned businesses, and have created awareness within the Indigenous community of Australia around the accessibility of First Nations people starting small businesses.

The agency partnered with healthcare company Headspace in 2021 to create a campaign promoting mental health awareness in efforts to reduce youth suicide rates within Aboriginal and Torres Strait Islander communities.

The agency was also involved in information dissemination during the COVID-19 pandemic in Australia. It was initially contracted to design pandemic safety adverts during 2020. In 2021, it was subsequently engaged by the Australian Government Department of Health to produce a campaign encouraging Aboriginal and Torres Strait Islanders to get vaccinated against the COVID-19 virus. At the time of the campaign's release on 25 October 2021, only 45.15% of the Aboriginal and Torres Strait Islander population were fully vaccinated against COVID-19, compared to 73.4% of Australia's population over 16 years of age as of 24 October 2021. The campaign sought to inspire and remind First Nations Australians to get vaccinated, and featured Indigenous celebrities including rapper Baker Boy, William Barton, chef Nornie Bero, model Samantha Harris, artist Tori-Jay Mordey and Paralympian Amanda Reid.
