= Bluff, Queensland =

Bluff
- Town
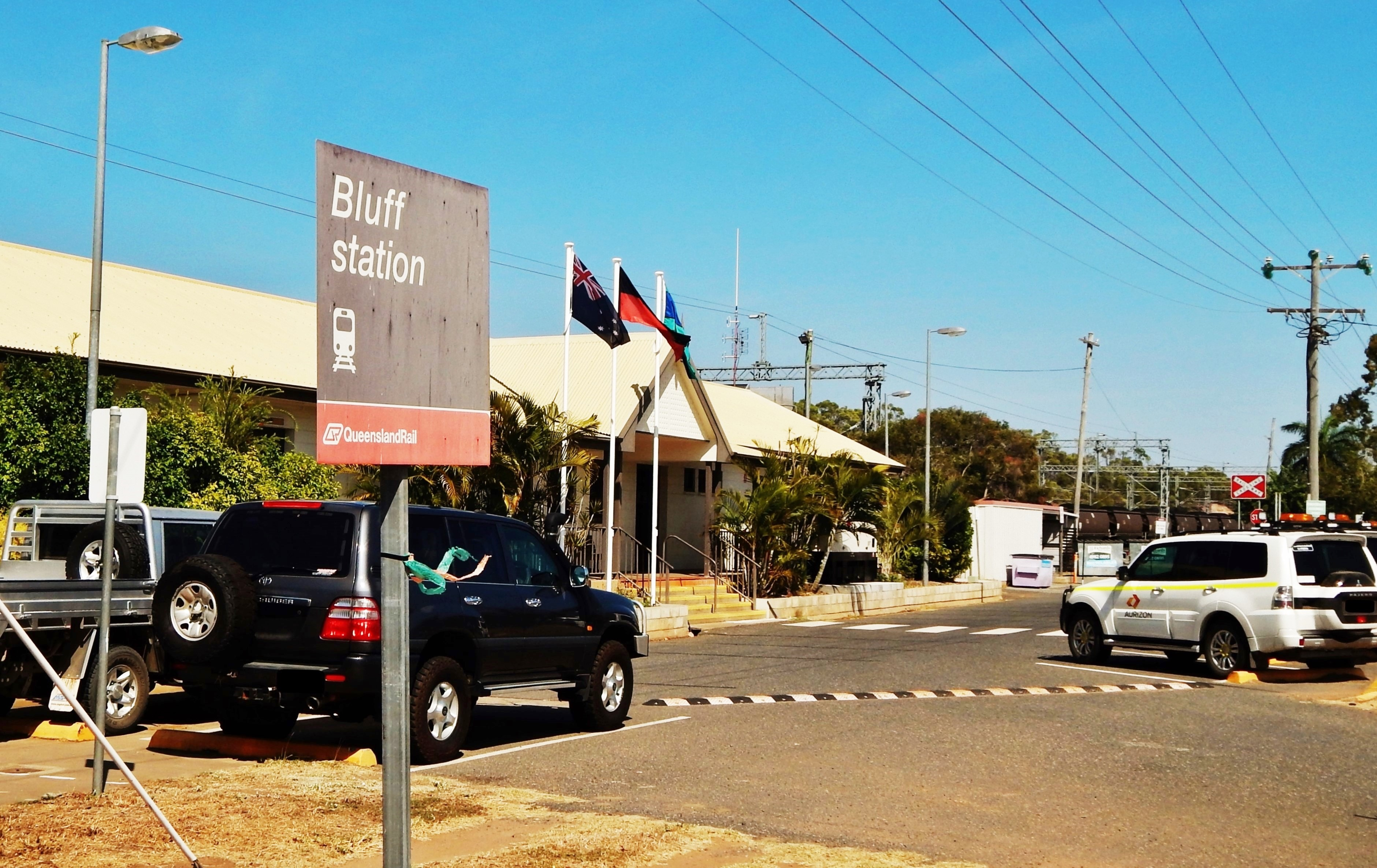
- Bluff railway station, 2017

- Interactive map of Bluff
- Coordinates: 23.5797°S 149.0705°E
- Country: Australia
- State: Queensland
- LGA: Central Highlands Region
- Location: 23 km (14 mi) E of Blackwater; 96 km (60 mi) E of Emerald; 177 km (110 mi) W of Rockhampton; 804 km (500 mi) NNW of Brisbane

Government
  - State electorate: Gregory
  - Federal division: Flynn

Area
  - Total: 682.3 km^{2} (263.4 sq mi)

Population
  - Total: 324 (2021 census)
  - Density: 0.4749/km^{2} (1.2299/sq mi)
- Time zone: UTC+10:00 (AEST)
- Postcode: 4702
Localities around Bluff
Jellinbah	Jellinbah	Jellinbah
Blackwater	Bluff	Dingo
Stewarton	Dingo	Dingo

Bluff is a rural town and locality in the Central Highlands Region, Queensland, Australia. In the 2021 census, the locality of Bluff had a population of 324 people.

== Geography ==
The town is located on the Capricorn Highway in Central Queensland, 804 kilometres (500 mi) north west of the state capital, Brisbane.

Bluff's location between some of Queensland's largest coal mines and the port of Gladstone has led to it becoming a major interchange station for large coal trains, some up to two kilometres long.

== History ==
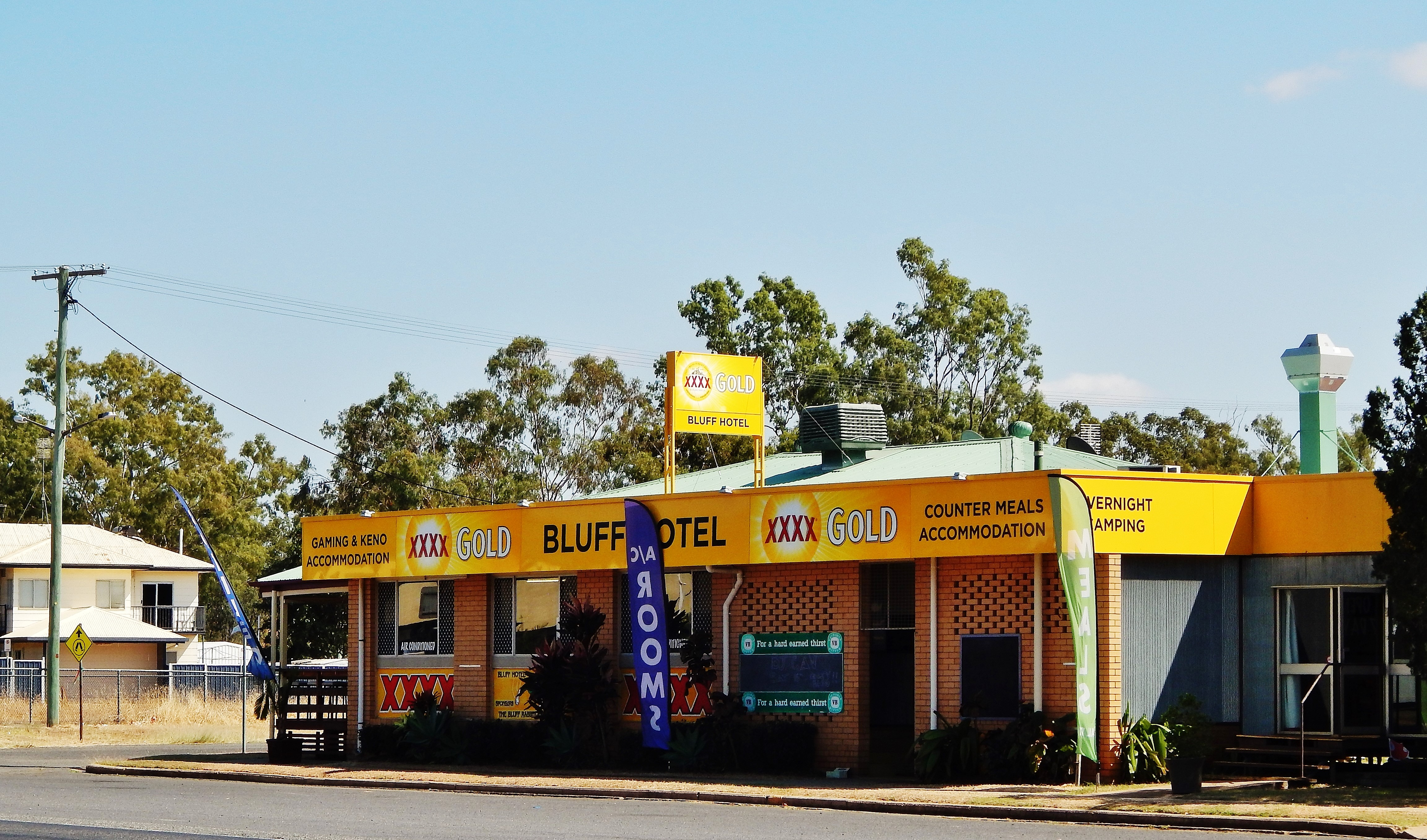
Bluff Hotel, 2017

Based on artefacts found on the nearby Blackdown Tableland National Park, Aboriginal people lived in this area for thousands of years.

The first European settlement occurred in the district in the 1860s as early pastoralists moved to the area.

The district was originally called Duckworth or Duckworth Creek, but in 1877 the name was changed to Bluff to match the name of the railway station. The Bluff name was derived from a local hill known as Arthur's Bluff.

Duckworth Post Office opened by September 1906 (a receiving office had been open from late 1905) and was renamed Bluff in 1907.

Duckworth Provisional School was established in January 1907 and opened in June 1907. However, the local people disliked the name Duckworth and a few months later, the name was changed to Bluff or Bluff Colliery Provisional School. On 1 January 1909, it became Bluff State School.

In 2017, a suspicious fire completely destroyed the Bluff Family Store, the town's local general store. Without anywhere to buy groceries, local Bluff residents needed to travel to Blackwater for supplies following the fire. However, three years after the fire, an independent business called the Bluff Servo opened in the town to continue supplying the community with groceries, toiletries and fuel.

Bluff and the surrounding districts are served by the Bluff Town and Rural Fire Brigade which has had active members on its books since 1975. A small shed in Church Street was built to house the brigade in 1980. After obtaining funding to build a larger facility in 2016, a new fire shed was built in Church Street which was officially opened in May 2018.

== Demographics ==
In the 2011 census, the locality of Bluff had a population of 370 people.

In the 2016 census, the locality of Bluff had a population of 373 people.

In the 2021 census, the locality of Bluff had a population of 324 people.

== Education ==
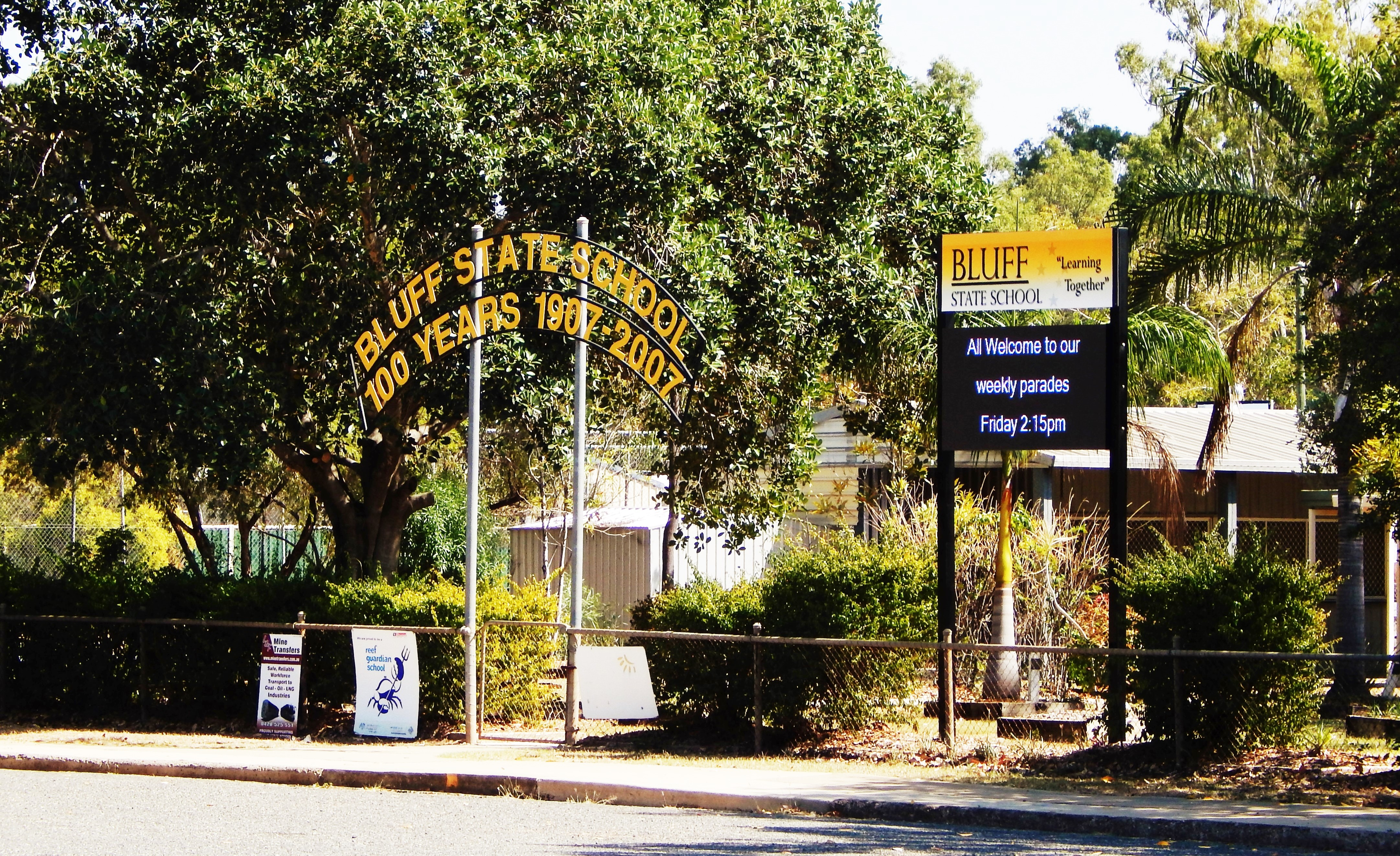
Bluff State School, 2017

Bluff State School is a government primary (Prep–6) school for boys and girls at Main Street (23.5821°S 149.0688°E). In 2017, the school had an enrolment of 15 students with 2 teachers and 4 non-teaching staff (2 full-time equivalent).

There are no secondary schools in Bluff. The nearest government secondary school is Blackwater State High School in neighbouring Blackwater to the west.

== Notable residents ==
- Mitchell Burns, photographer and social media influencer
- Casey Conway, National Rugby League player for Sydney Roosters
