= Jellinbah coal mine =

Mine in Queensland, Australia

Jellinbah East Coal Mine
- Location within Queensland
- Location: Jellinbah, Queensland, Australia; 23°23′14″S 148°57′27″E
- Products: Coking coal
- Opened: 1989
- Company: Jellinbah East Joint Venture

The Jellinbah East Coal Mine is a coal mine located in the Bowen Basin at Jellinbah in Central Queensland, Australia. The mine has coal reserves amounting to 196 million tonnes of coking coal, one of the largest coal reserves in Australia and the world. The mine has an annual production capacity of 3.5 million tonnes of coal.

The mine is owned by the Jellinbah East Joint Venture which is composed of Jellinbah Group (70%), Marubeni Coal (15%) and Sojitz Coal (15%). The Central pit is mined by the owner while the Plains pit is mined by Leighton Contractors. Leighton started operations in 2013 after taking over from the John Holland Group in 2013. The mine was founded by Sam Chong, Jim Gorman, Gary Zamel and the late Ken Talbot. Operations at the open-cut mine begin in 1989.

Coal from Jellinbah East is exported via truck to the Blackwater railway system and on to the Port of Gladstone.

== See also ==
- Coal mining in Australia
