= Jellinbah, Queensland =

Jellinbah
- Suburb
- Interactive map of Jellinbah
- Coordinates: 23.2655°S 149.0355°E
- Country: Australia
- State: Queensland
- LGA: Central Highlands Region
- Location: 46.5 km (28.9 mi) NNE of Blackwater; 121 km (75 mi) ENE of Emerald; 222 km (138 mi) W of Rockhampton; 825 km (513 mi) NNW of Brisbane

Government
  - State electorate: Gregory
  - Federal division: Flynn

Area
  - Total: 596.9 km^{2} (230.5 sq mi)

Population
  - Total: 49 (2021 census)
  - Density: 0.0821/km^{2} (0.2126/sq mi)
- Time zone: UTC+10:00 (AEST)
- Postcode: 4702
Suburbs around Jellinbah
Mackenzie River	Bingegang	Bingegang
Mackenzie River	Jellinbah	Alsace
Blackwater	Bluff	Dingo

Jellinbah is a rural locality in the Central Highlands Region, Queensland, Australia. In the 2021 census, Jellinbah had a population of 49 people. Jellinbah coal mine is in the locality.

== Geography ==
The Mackenzie River forms the western boundary of the locality, while Parker Creek and its tributary Return Creek form the north-eastern boundary.

The Fitzroy Developmental Road enters the locality from the south-east (Dingo), forms the south-eastern boundary of the locality and a section of the north-eastern boundary, before exiting to the north (Bingegang).

There are coal mines in the south and south-west of the locality. Apart from the mines, the predominant land use is grazing on native vegetation with some crop growing in the centre of the locality.

== Demographics ==
In the 2016 census, Jellinbah had a population of 35 people.

In the 2021 census, Jellinbah had a population of 49 people.

== Education ==
There are no schools in Jellinbah. The nearest government primary schools are Blackwater State School in neighbouring Blackwater to the south-west, Bluff State School in neighbouring Bluff to the south, and Dingo State School in neighbouring Dingo to the south-east. However, some parts of Jellinbah would be too distant from these primary schools for a daily commute. The nearest government secondary school is Blackwater State High School, also in Blackwater, but most parts of Jellinbah would be too distant for a daily commute. The alternatives are distance education and boarding school.
