= Pulverized coal injection method =

Method for improving the performance of a blast furnace

Pulverized coal injection is a method for improving the performance of a blast furnace.

== Background ==
Iron is a metal that has fundamentally affected the way of life of human beings ever since the Iron Age. It is relatively abundant and can easily be extracted and modified due to its useful material properties, all of which result in low prices. After the Industrial Revolution (18-19th century), iron became a core material of industrial markets, its importance reflected in the phrase “iron is nation”; its production was directly regarded as an indication of national power. Especially after World War II, governments vigorously supported the growth of an iron industrial market, which significantly contributed to the development of a global economy. Iron is extracted from its ore and smelted in a metallurgical furnace called a "blast furnace".

The blast furnace method is expected to survive into the 22nd century because of its efficient rate of iron production at competitive costs compared with other iron-making methods. Blast furnaces keep on improving with adaptations arising from new technologies driven by rising global demand, yet the main chemical process remains the same. But process improvement cannot solve many of the problems associated with blast furnaces. The rate of iron production is highly influenced by fluctuations in the world economy, and improving the operational efficiency of the process is of major concern. However, the biggest drawback of blast furnace operation is the inevitable carbon dioxide production from iron reduction processes, which is considered one of the major contributors in global warming. Accordingly, the Pulverized Coal Injection (PCI) method is becoming an internationally popular method for improving blast furnace operation.

== Pulverized coal injection method ==
Pulverized coal injection was developed in the 19th century, but was not implemented industrially until the 1970s. Rises in the cost of coke due to increased global demand and thus more competition for the resource have made this method attractive to the iron-producing industries and increased its value.

The PCI method is based on the simple concept of primary air (termed the "conveying gas") carrying pulverized coal which injected through a lance to the tuyere (mid-bottom inlet of a blast furnace), then mixed with secondary hot air (termed the "blast") supplied through a blowpipe in the tuyere and then piped to a furnace to create a balloon-like cavity called a "raceway", which then propagates coal and coke combustion and melts the solid iron ore, releasing molten iron. The most remarkable aspect of this method is that it allows for cheaper coal to be consumed in the system, replace expensive coke, thereby remarkably cutting down on costs. Because of the extreme heat inside the furnace (>2000 Kelvin), visual observation of raceway shape and size is impossible, so remotely measuring sensors are used to investigate the chemical and physical reactions inside the furnace.

Better understanding of the raceway and PCI method can optimize the performance of a blast furnace and reduce costs. Further improvements to the PCI method and the use of coal blend (mixing different coals) injection methods are attracting industry.
