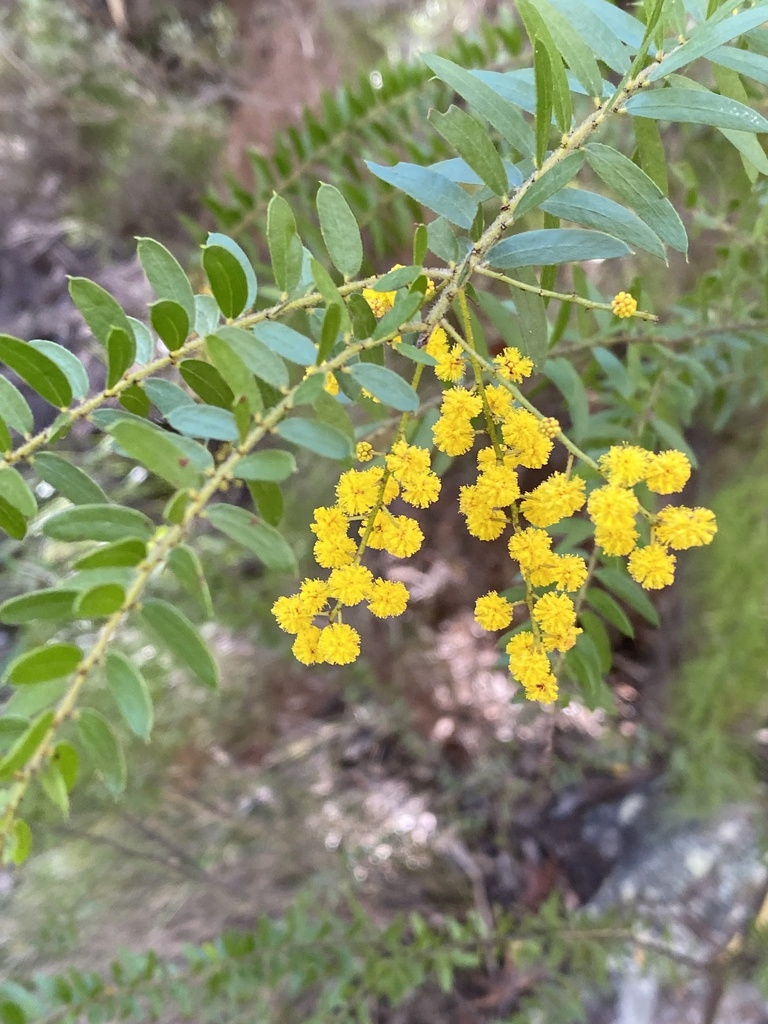
- In Expedition National Park

Scientific classification
- Kingdom: Plantae
- Clade: Embryophytes
- Clade: Tracheophytes
- Clade: Spermatophytes
- Clade: Angiosperms
- Clade: Eudicots
- Clade: Rosids
- Order: Fabales
- Family: Fabaceae
- Subfamily: Caesalpinioideae
- Clade: Mimosoid clade
- Genus: Acacia
- Species: A. leichhardtii

Binomial name
- Acacia leichhardtii Benth.
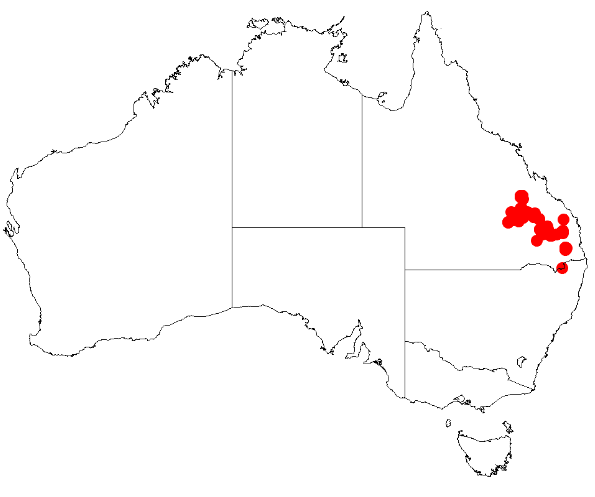
- Occurrence data from AVH

Synonyms
- Racosperma leichhardtii Benth.) Pedley

= Acacia leichhardtii =

Leichhardt's wattle

Species of legume

Acacia leichhardtii, commonly known as Leichhardt's wattle, is a species of flowering plant in the family Fabaceae and is endemic to south-east Queensland, Australia. It is a spreading shrub with slender branches, often arching downwards, narrowly oblong to elliptic or lance-shaped phyllodes, spherical heads of bright golden yellow flowers and narrowly oblong, curved to straight, firmly papery to thinly leathery pods

== Description ==
Acacia leichhardtii is a spreading shrub that typically grows to a height of up to 3 m (9.8 ft) and has slender branches that often arch downwards and branchlets covered in soft hairs. Its phyllodes are narrowly oblong to elliptic or lance-shaped, straight to slightly curved, 15–30 mm (0.59–1.18 in) long and 3–6 mm (0.12–0.24 in) wide with lateral veins obscure or absent and a gland 2–12 mm (0.079–0.472 in) above the pulvinus. There is a small distinct point on the end of the phyllodes. The flowers are borne in twelve to twenty spherical heads in racemes 30–80 mm (1.2–3.1 in) long on more or less glabrous peduncles 3–8 mm (0.12–0.31 in) long, each head with 20 to 40 bright golden yellow flowers. Flowering occurs from May to July, and the pods are narrowly oblong, curved to straight, up to 100 mm (3.9 in) long, 8–10 mm (0.31–0.39 in) wide, firmly papery to thinly leathery and densely covered with velvety hairs. The seeds are oblong to elliptic, 5–6 mm (0.20–0.24 in) long and black with a club-shaped aril.

== Taxonomy ==
Acacia leichhardtii was first formally described in 1864 by George Bentham in 1864 in his book, Flora Australiensis, from specimens collected in the Expedition Range by Ludwig Leichhardt. The specific epithet (leichhardtii) honours the explorer and naturalist Friedrich Wilhelm Ludwig Leichhardt, who collected the type specimen.

== Distribution and habitat ==
Leichhardt's wattle is found in sporadic locations from the Blackdown Tableland National Park and south-east to Helidon where it grows in shallow soil on sandstone in open forest with closed scrub.

== Conservation status ==
Acacia leichhardtii is listed as 'least concern' under the Queensland Government Nature Conservation Act 1992.

== See also ==
- List of Acacia species
