= Prostanthera oleoides =

Scientific classification
- Kingdom: Plantae
- Clade: Tracheophytes
- Clade: Angiosperms
- Clade: Eudicots
- Clade: Asterids
- Order: Lamiales
- Family: Lamiaceae
- Genus: Prostanthera
- Species: P. oleoides

Binomial name
- Prostanthera oleoides T.C.Wilson & B.J.Conn
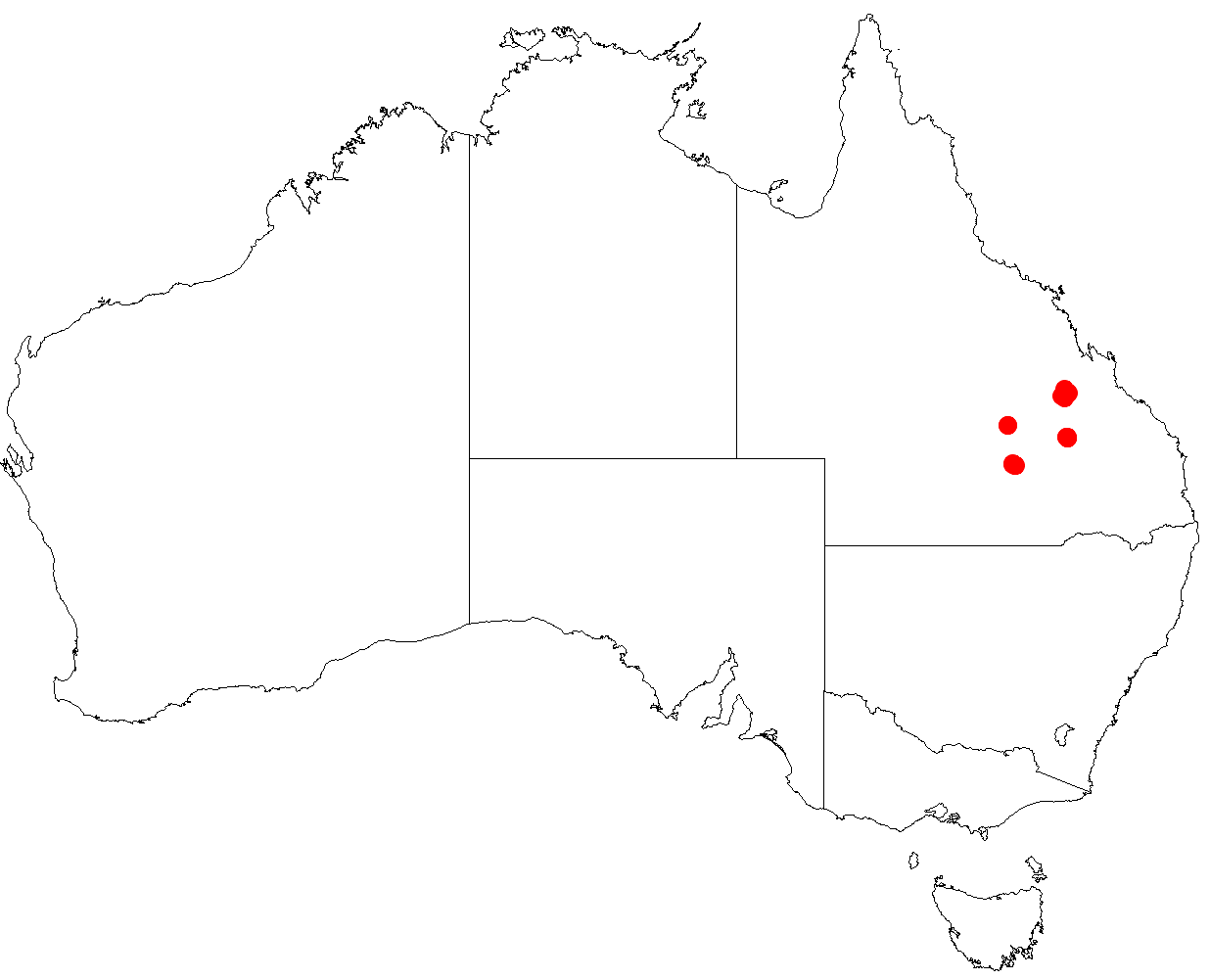
- Occurrence data from AVH

Species of flowering plant

Prostanthera oleoides is a species of flowering plant that is endemic to central Queensland. It is an open, erect shrub with four-sided branchlets, narrow elliptic, oblong or egg-shaped leaves with the narrower end towards the base, and mauve flowers with purple to dark mauve markings.

== Description ==
Prostanthera oleoides is an open, erect shrub that typically grows to a height of 2 m (6 ft 7 in) with four-sided branchlets. The leaves are dark green above, paler below, narrow elliptic, oblong or egg-shaped leaves with the narrower end towards the base, 18–30 mm (0.71–1.18 in) long and 4–6 mm (0.16–0.24 in) wide on a petiole 1–3 mm (0.039–0.118 in) long. The flowers are arranged in leafy groups of eight to fourteen near the ends of branchlets, each flower on a stalk 1–3 mm (0.039–0.118 in) long. The sepals are greenish red, forming a tube 2–3 mm (0.079–0.118 in) long with two lobes, the upper lobe 0.5–1.5 mm (0.020–0.059 in) long and the lower lobe 1–2.5 mm (0.039–0.098 in) long. The petals are mauve with purple to dark mauve markings and 10–12 mm (0.39–0.47 in) long, forming a tube 3–5 mm (0.12–0.20 in) long with two lips. The central lower lobe is 4–5 mm (0.16–0.20 in) long and the side lobes are 3–4 mm (0.12–0.16 in) long. The upper lip is egg-shaped, 3–4 mm (0.12–0.16 in) long and wide with a central notch.

== Taxonomy ==
Prostanthera oleoides was first formally described in 2015 by Trevor Wilson and Barry Conn in the journal Telopea, based on material collected in the Blackdown Tableland National Park.

== Distribution and habitat ==
This prostanthera occurs on the central Queensland sandstone belt in the Blackdown Tableland, Expedition and Chesterton Range National Parks where it grows in soil derived from sandstone, on and below sandstone escarpments.

== Conservation status ==
This mintbush is classified as of "least concern" under the Queensland Government Nature Conservation Act 1992.
