= Minerva Hills National Park =

National park in Australia

- IUCN category II (national park)
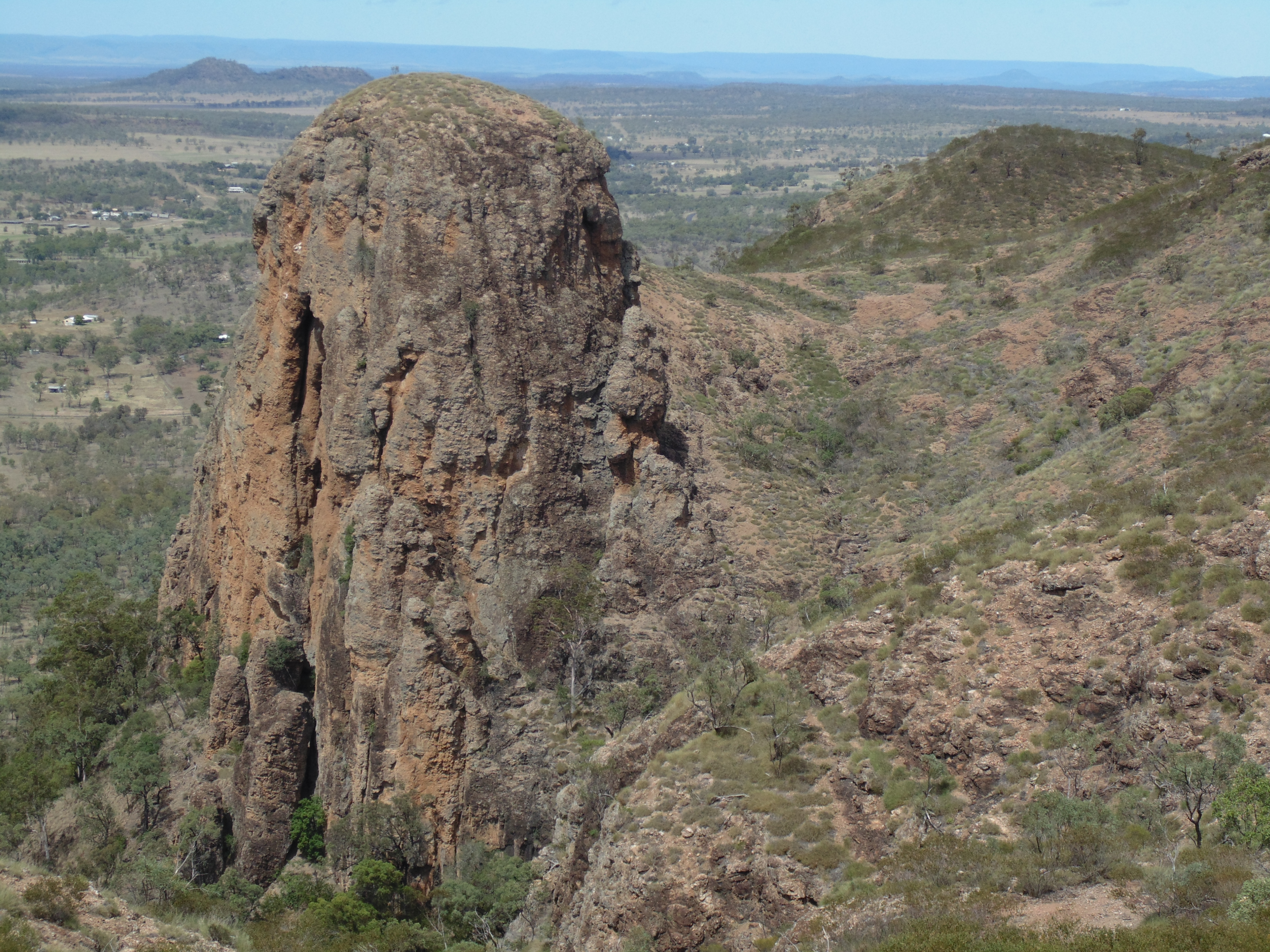
- The Tower, 2014

- Location within Queensland
- Location: Queensland
- Nearest city: Springsure
- Coordinates: 24°04′50″S 148°03′51″E
- Area: 27.90 km^{2} (10.77 sq mi)
- Established: 1994
- Governing body: Queensland Parks and Wildlife Service
- Website: Official website

Minerva Hills is a national park in Central Queensland, Australia, 626 km northwest of Brisbane. Lookouts within the national park overlook the town of Springsure. The park features a rugged landscape with volcanic peaks, sheltered gorges, sheer cliffs, open woodlands and dry rainforest.

The park lies within the water catchment areas of the Comet and Nogoa rivers and within the Brigalow Belt bioregion.

There are four lookouts and a picnic area for visitors. Camping is not allowed in the park.

== Geology ==
The Minerva Hills National Park sits on the Oligocene Minerva Hills Volcanics. These volcanics have been broadly divided into a basal series of mafic lavas (some 70 m thick) overlain by a series of intercalated mafic volcanics, felsic volcanics ranging from trachyte to rhyolite and trachytic pyroclastics. The pyroclastics are related to plugs and domes. The lower sequence has been dated at approximately 33–34 Ma (million years) and the upper sequence 28.5–27.5 Ma.

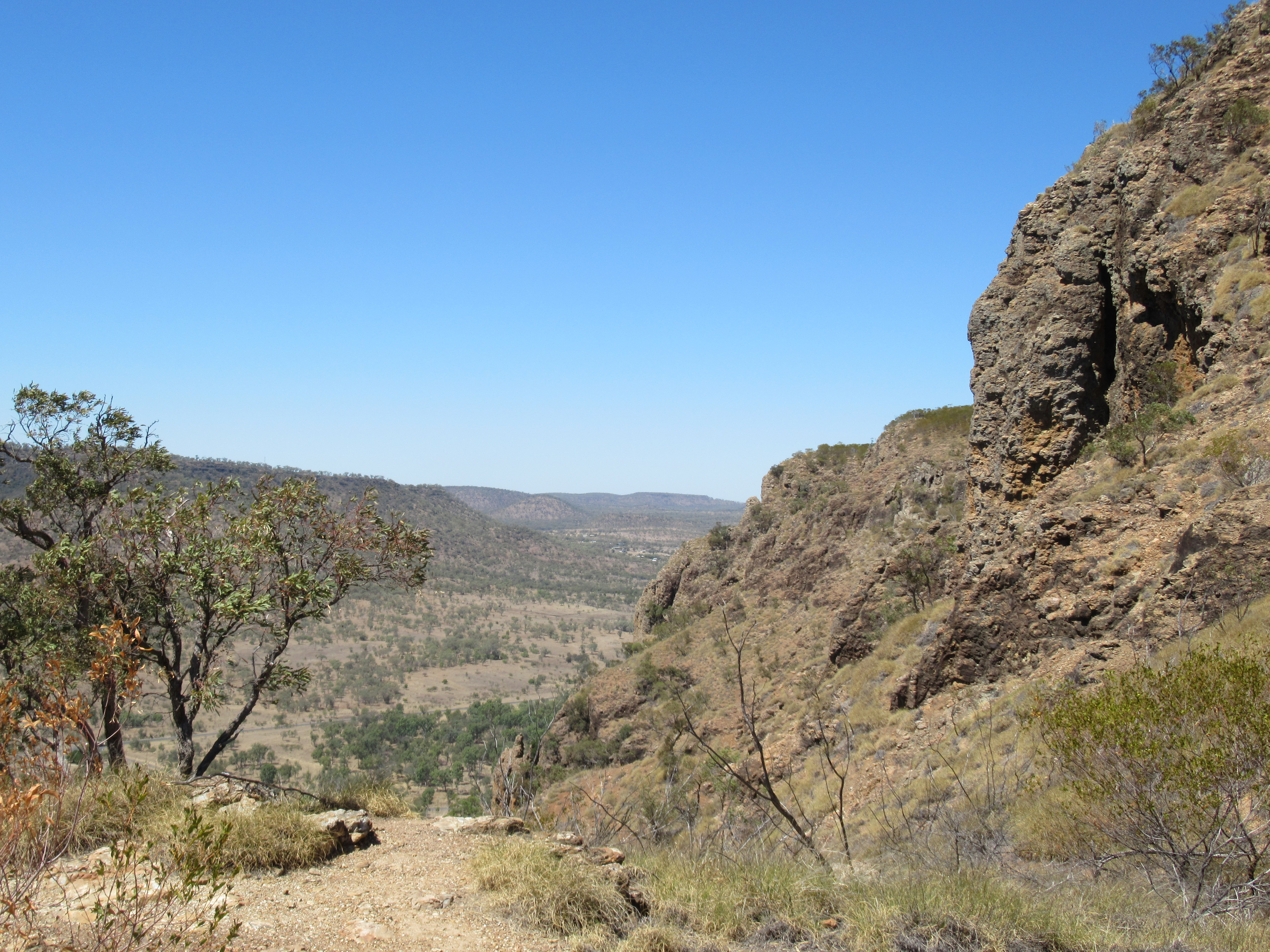
View of Minerva Hills National Park

The Minerva Hills Volcanics is a remnant of Oligocene hot spot volcanism known as the Cosgrove Hot Spot. This hot spot forms the longest continental hot spot track on earth.

== See also ==
- Protected areas of Queensland
