= Pterostylis mitchellii =

Mitchell's rustyhood

Scientific classification
- Kingdom: Plantae
- Clade: Tracheophytes
- Clade: Angiosperms
- Clade: Monocots
- Order: Asparagales
- Family: Orchidaceae
- Subfamily: Orchidoideae
- Tribe: Cranichideae
- Genus: Pterostylis
- Species: P. mitchellii

Binomial name
- Pterostylis mitchellii M.A.Clem.

Synonyms
- Pterostylis rufa var. mitchellii (Lindl. Fitzg.; Pterostylis gibbosa subsp. mitchellii (Lindl.) Blackmore & Clemesha; Oligochaetochilus mitchellii (Lindl.) Szlach.

Species of orchid

Pterostylis mitchellii, commonly known as Mitchell's rustyhood, is a plant in the orchid family Orchidaceae and is endemic to eastern Australia. Both flowering and non-flowering plants have a rosette of leaves and flowering plants have up to fifteen flowers which have wide flanges on the petals and an insect-like labellum with a white "head".

== Description ==
Pterostylis mitchellii is a terrestrial, perennial, deciduous, herb with an underground tuber and a rosette of between five and eight leaves. The leaves are 15–50 mm (0.6–2 in) long and 6–20 mm (0.2–0.8 in) wide. Flowering plants have a rosette at the base of the flowering stem but the leaves are usually withered by flowering time. Between two and fifteen translucent white flowers with green and brown markings and 23–26 mm (0.9–1 in) long, 8–10 mm (0.3–0.4 in) wide are borne on a flowering spike 200–500 mm (8–20 in) tall. The dorsal sepal and petals form a hood or "galea" over the column with the petals having wide flanges on their outer edge. The dorsal sepal has a narrow tip 3–7 mm (0.1–0.3 in) long. The lateral sepals turn downwards and are much wider than the galea and suddenly taper to narrow tips 7–10 mm (0.3–0.4 in) long which curve away from each other. The labellum is fleshy, greenish-brown and insect-like, about 5 mm (0.2 in) long and 2 mm (0.08 in) wide. The "head" end is white with short bristles and the "body" has five to eight long hairs on each side. Flowering occurs from August to October.

== Taxonomy and naming ==
Pterostylis mitchellii was first formally described in 1848 by John Lindley from a specimen collected on Mount Kennedy in southern Queensland during Thomas Mitchell's 1845-1846 expedition. The description was published in Mitchell's book, Journal of an Expedition into the Interior of Tropical Australia.

== Distribution and habitat ==
Mitchell's rustyhood is widespread and locally common in dry woodland and forest between the Blackdown Tableland in Queensland and Narrabri in New South Wales.
