= Burton Gorge Dam =

Dam in Queensland, Australia

- Location of the dam in Queensland
- Interactive map of Burton Gorge Dam
- Country: Australia
- Location: Moranbah, SW of Mackay, Central Queensland
- Coordinates: 21°37′19″S 148°07′48″E
- Purpose: Potable water supply
- Status: Operational
- Opening date: 1992
- Built by: White Construction
- Designed by: Unman and Nolan
- Operator: RAG Australia Coal

Dam and spillways
- Type of dam: Gravity dam
- Impounds: Isaac River
- Height (foundation): 26 m (85 ft)
- Length: 285 m (935 ft)
- Dam volume: 68×10^{3} m^{3} (2.4×10^{6} cu ft)

Reservoir
- Total capacity: 20×10^{6} m^{3} (710×10^{6} cu ft)

The Burton Gorge Dam is a gravity dam across the Isaac River, approximately 40 kilometres (25 mi) upstream of Moranbah, in Central Queensland, Australia. The dam supplies potable water supply and is owned and operated by RAG Australia Coal subsidiaries.

North Goonyella Coal Properties has a licence to take 1,700 megalitres (60×10^{6} cu ft) per annum from the dam.

== See also ==
- List of dams and reservoirs in Australia
