= Nogoa River =

River in Queensland, Australia

Nogoa
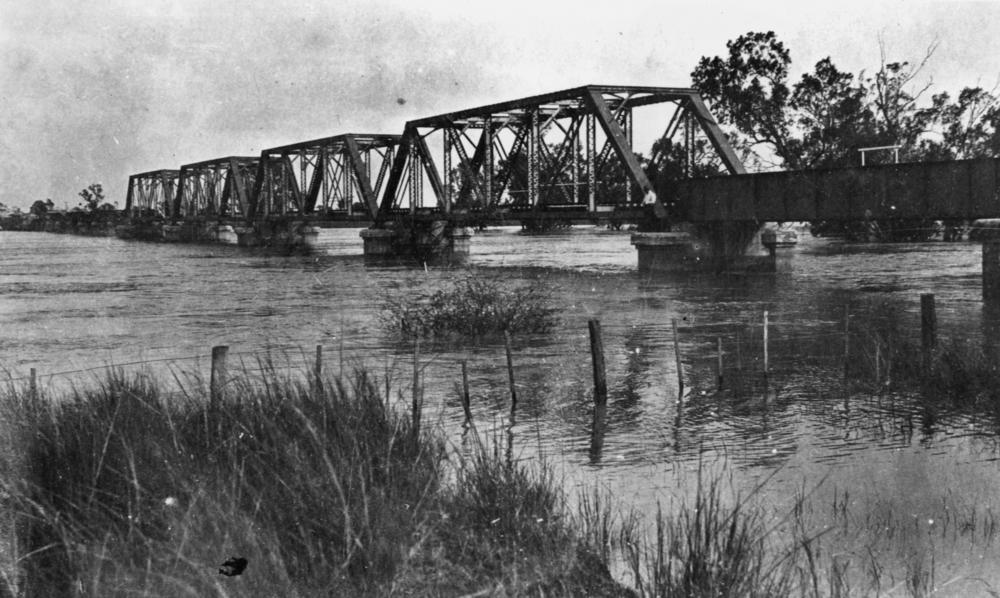
- Railway bridge in Emerald during a flood, 1918

- Location of Nogoa River mouth in Queensland

Location
- Country: Australia
- State: Queensland
- Region: Central Queensland
- City: Emerald

Physical characteristics
- Source: Carnarvon Range
  - location: Carnarvon National Park
  - coordinates: 24°51′38″S 147°00′16″E
  - elevation: 501 m (1,644 ft)
- Mouth: confluence with Comet River, forming the Mackenzie River
  - location: north of Comet
  - coordinates: 23°33′21″S 148°32′11″E
  - elevation: 144 m (472 ft)
- Length: 569 km (354 mi)
- Basin size: 27,690 km^{2} (10,690 sq mi)

Basin features
- River system: Fitzroy River basin
- National parks: Carnarvon National Park, Minerva Hills National Park, Peak Range National Park, Snake Range National Park

The Nogoa River is a river in Central Queensland, Australia.

== Course and features ==
The river rises on the Carnarvon Range, part of the Great Dividing Range, in the Carnarvon National Park and flows in a generally north easterly direction towards Emerald. From source to mouth, the Nogoa River is joined by 29 minor tributaries. North of Comet the river forms confluence with the Comet River to form the Mackenzie River. The Nogoa descends 361 metres (1,184 ft) over its 569-kilometre (354 mi) course. The river is crossed by the Gregory and Capricorn Highways at Emerald.

The river has a catchment area of 27,690 square kilometres (10,690 sq mi) draining parts of the Minerva Hills, Peak Range, Snake Range national parks. Of this area, 271 kilometres (168 mi) is riverine wetlands.

The reservoir created by Queensland's second largest dam, Lake Maraboon was formed when the Fairbairn Dam was built on the river in 1972. The dam and a network of channels along the Nogoa River supplies water for the Emerald Irrigation Area.

Sir Thomas Mitchell was the first European explorer to discover the river on 19 July 1846.

=== Major flooding events ===
In January 2008, the Nogoa River reached record flood levels. During the flood, water levels in the Fairbairn Dam rapidly exceeded 100%. Within a week inundations had caused severe disruptions to graziers, crops growers and to residents of Emerald when waters broke its banks. The Nogoa peaked at 15.4 m (51 ft) in Emerald on the night of January 22 2008, causing more than 2500 people to be evacuated. The unprecedented floods washed through the Ensham coal mine, temporarily halting operations in two out of six coal pits, reducing output to less than 50% and rendering a huge dragline defunct after it had been submerged.

In December 2010 - January 2011 the river was impacted by major flooding at Emerald and in the Nogoa's upper catchment.

== Cultural Heritage ==
The traditional owners include the Gayiri people who occupied the area for tens of thousands of years before European colonisation began in the nineteenth century. The Gayiri (Kairi, Khararya) language region takes in the landscape of the Central Highlands Regional Council, including Emerald and Nogoa River.

== See also ==
- List of rivers of Australia § Queensland
