= Gayiri =

Aboriginal Australian people of central Queensland

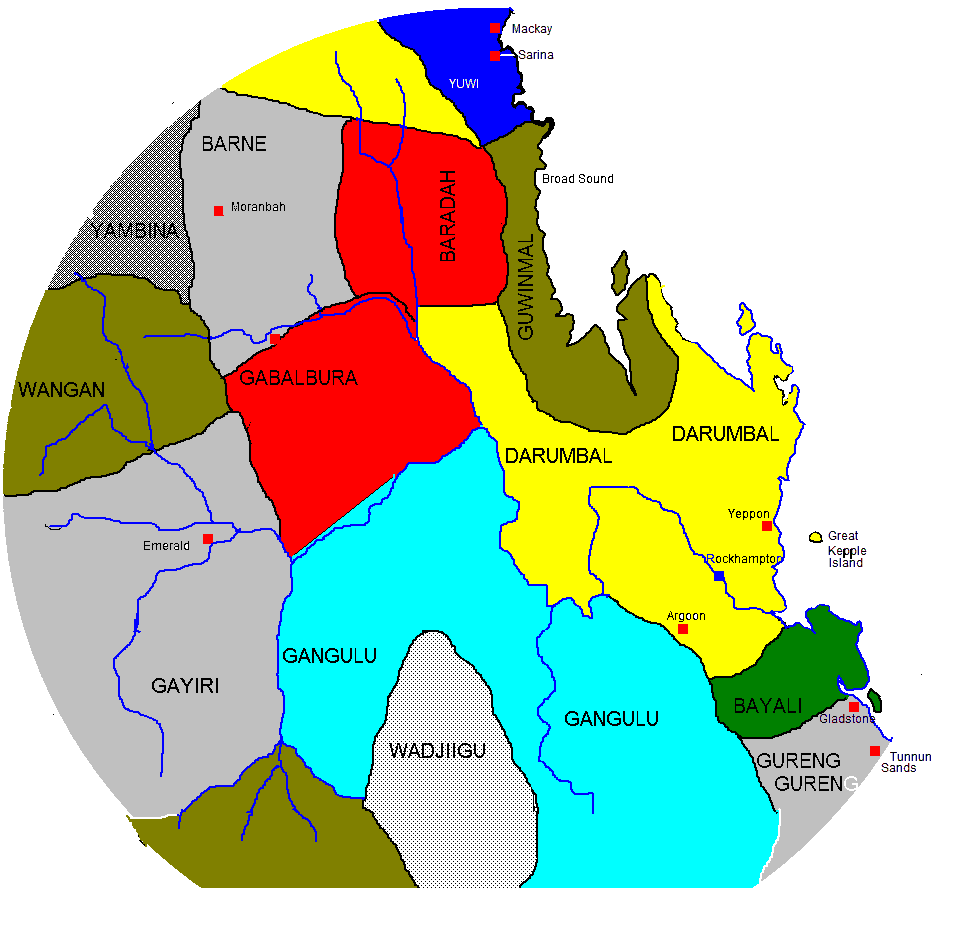
Aboriginal peoples of central-Eastern Queensland

The Gayiri, people, also spelt or known as Kairi, Kararya, Kari, Khararya and Kaira, Bimurraburra, Gahrarja, Gara Gara, Ara Ara, and Kara Kara, are an Aboriginal Australian people of the state of Queensland.

== Country ==
According to an estimation made by Norman Tindale, the Kairi held sway over some 5,900 square miles (15,000 km^{2}) of territory, from the Great Dividing Range south of Springsure (Note: Middleton and Noble state they were some 25 miles north of present-day Springsure.) north to Capella. The Drummond Range formed their western frontier, while their eastern boundaries were drawn by the Comet and upper Mackenzie (Nogoa) rivers.

== Social organisation ==
The Kairi were divided into hordes, the name of at least one of which is known.

- Bimurraburra (a clan in the environs of Emerald)

== Alternative names ==
- Khararya (kara is their word for "no".)
- Bimurraburra

== Cullin-la-ringo massacre ==
Gayiri men were involved in the Cullin-la-ringo massacre, in which 19 settlers were killed as retribution after Gayiri men had been murdered after being falsely accused of stealing cattle. Settlers and native police killed around 370 Gayiri people in reprisal killings.

== Sources ==
- Middleton, T.; Noble, E. Irving (1887). "Nogoa" (PDF). In Curr, Edward Micklethwaite (ed.). The Australian race: its origin, languages, customs, place of landing in Australia and the routes by which it spread itself over the continent. Vol. 3. Melbourne: J. Ferres. pp. 90–95.
- Tindale, Norman Barnett (1974). "Kairi (QLD)". Aboriginal Tribes of Australia: Their Terrain, Environmental Controls, Distribution, Limits, and Proper Names. Australian National University Press.
