= Snake Range National Park =

National park in Queensland, Australia

- IUCN category II (national park)
- Location within Queensland
- Location: Queensland
- Nearest city: Springsure
- Coordinates: 24°02′35″S 147°35′01″E
- Area: 26.88 km^{2} (10.38 sq mi)
- Established: 1972
- Governing body: Queensland Parks and Wildlife Service

Snake Range is a national park in Central Queensland, Australia, 665 km northwest of Brisbane. The park lies within the Nogoa River drainage basin in the Brigalow Belt bioregion. It is only accessible to the public via tracks over private land.

Snake Range was gazetted for its high scenic, biological and cultural heritage values. The land is mountainous, with weathered sandstone ridges and small gorges. There are balancing rocks, cliffs, buttresses, wind blown caves and flowing springs. No cultural survey has been undertaken, but there is evidence of cultural sites throughout the park. The Queensland Department of National Parks considers the Rubbervine, Cryptostegia grandiflora, to be a moderate threat to the ecology of the park.

== See also ==
- Protected areas of Queensland
