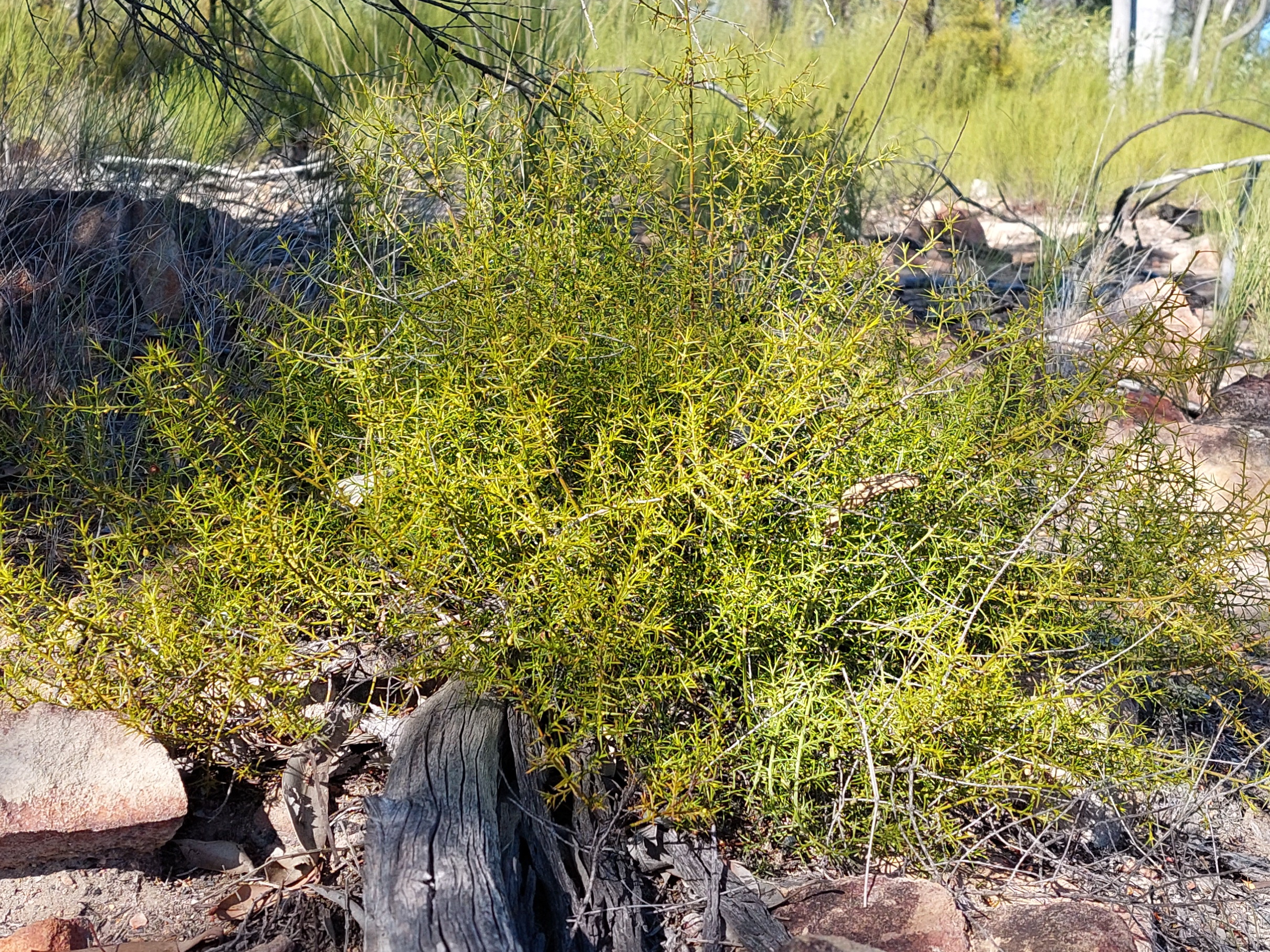

Scientific classification
- Kingdom: Plantae
- Clade: Tracheophytes
- Clade: Angiosperms
- Clade: Eudicots
- Clade: Rosids
- Order: Celastrales
- Family: Celastraceae
- Genus: Apatophyllum
- Species: A. teretifolium

Binomial name
- Apatophyllum teretifolium A.R.Bean & Jessup
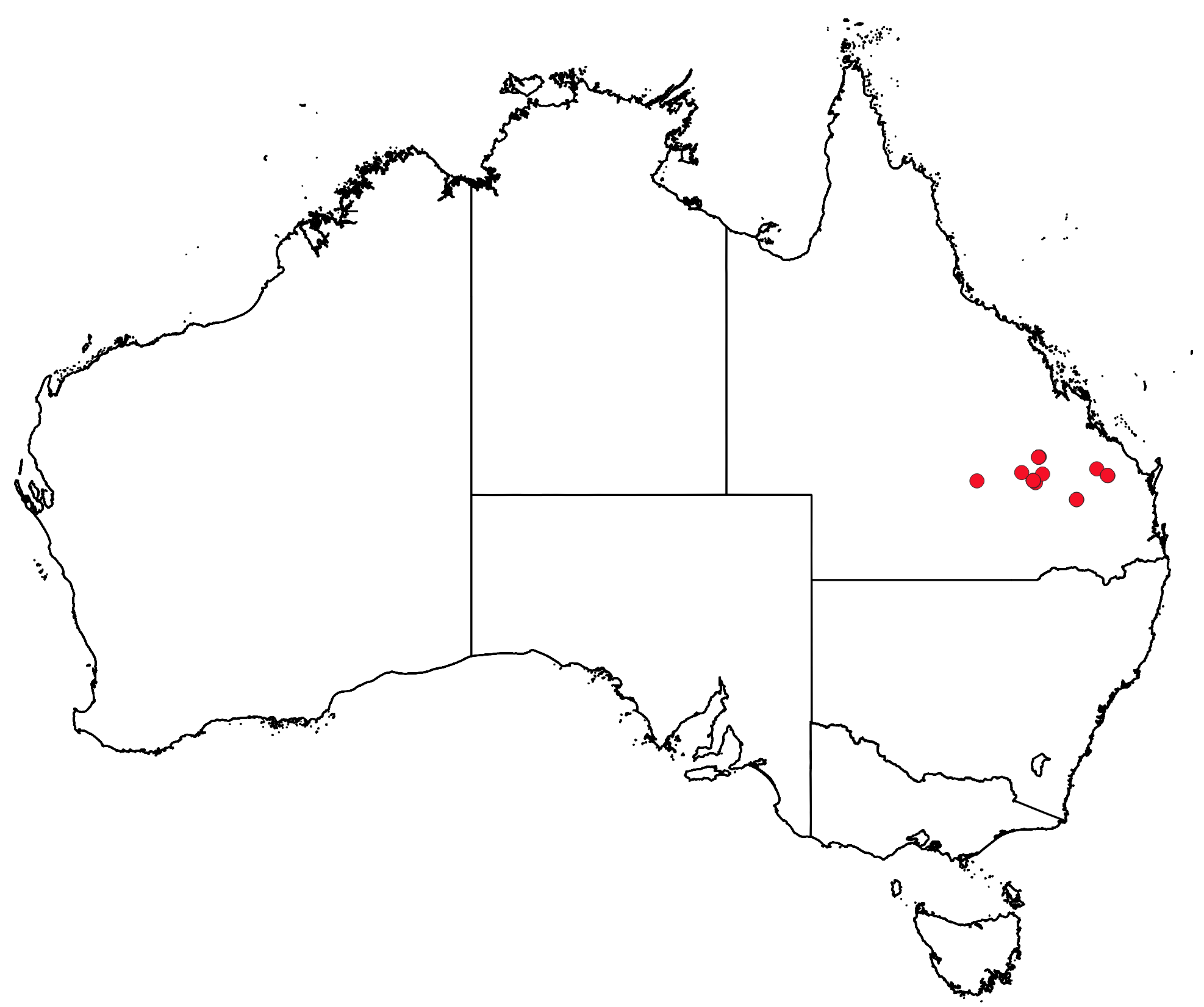
- Occurrence data from AVH

= Apatophyllum teretifolium =

Species of plant

Apatophyllum teretifolium is a species of flowering plant in the family Celastraceae, native to Australia. It was first described by A.R. (Tony) Bean and L.W. Jessop in 2000.

== Description ==
Apatophyllum teretifolium is a densely branched compact rounded shrub to about 40 cm high. The opposite pungent pointed terete leaves to about 12 mm long have persistent linear brown stipules.

The inflorescence consists of single flowers in the leaf axils. The cream flowers usually have four petals and four stamens. Some plants have flowers with five petals and five stamens. The fruit is a generally smooth capsule about 5.2 to 6 mm long and 2.0 to 2.8 mm wide.

== Distribution ==
Apatophyllum teretifolium is currently known from the following reserves: Expedition National Park, Barakula State Forest near Chinchilla, Lonesome National Park, Nour Nour National Park and the Moolayember Section of Carnarvon National Park. Apatophyllum teretifolium is also known from several private properties.

== Conservation ==
Apatophyllum teretifolium is listed as Near Threatened under the Queensland Nature Conservation Act 1992.

== Gallery ==
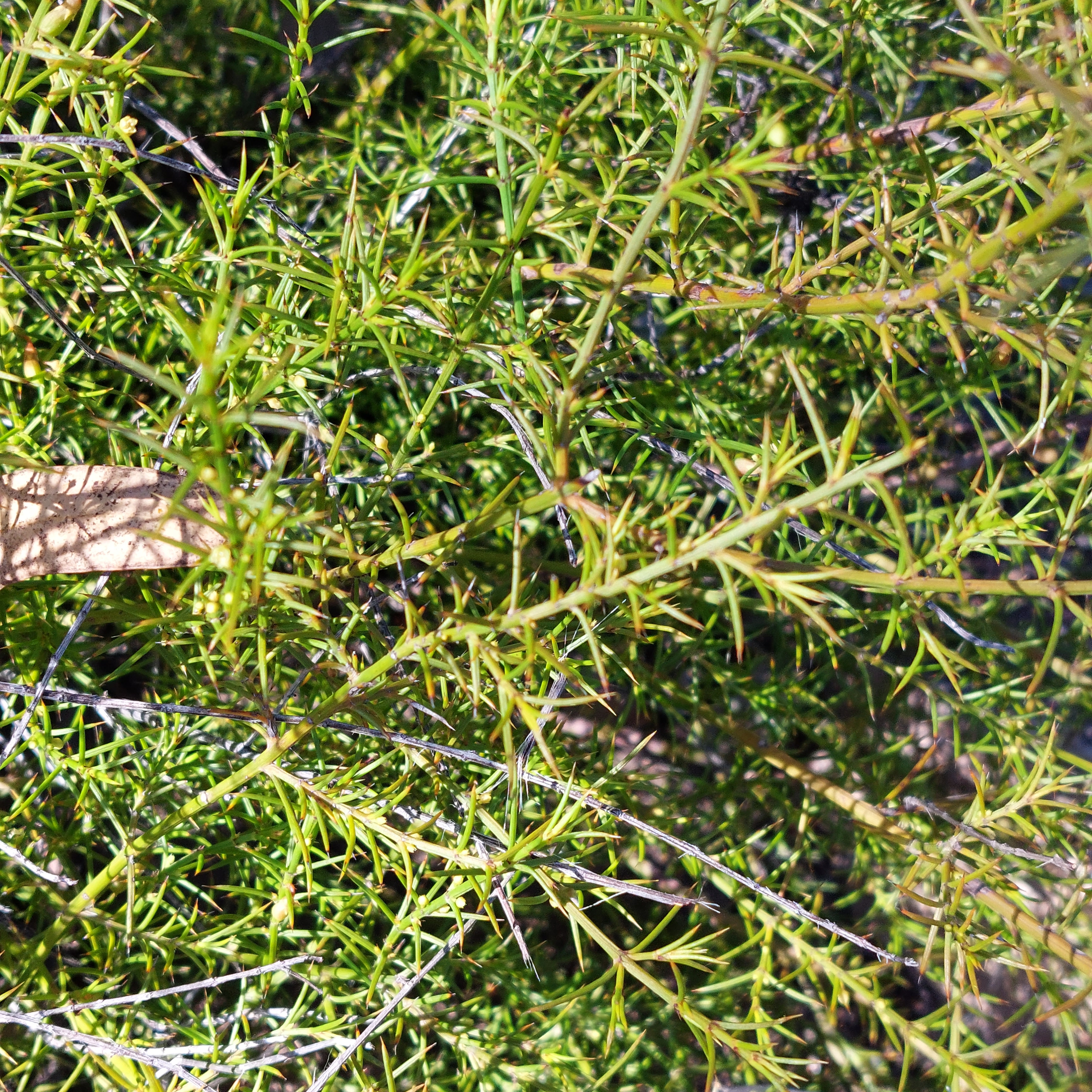
Dense branching

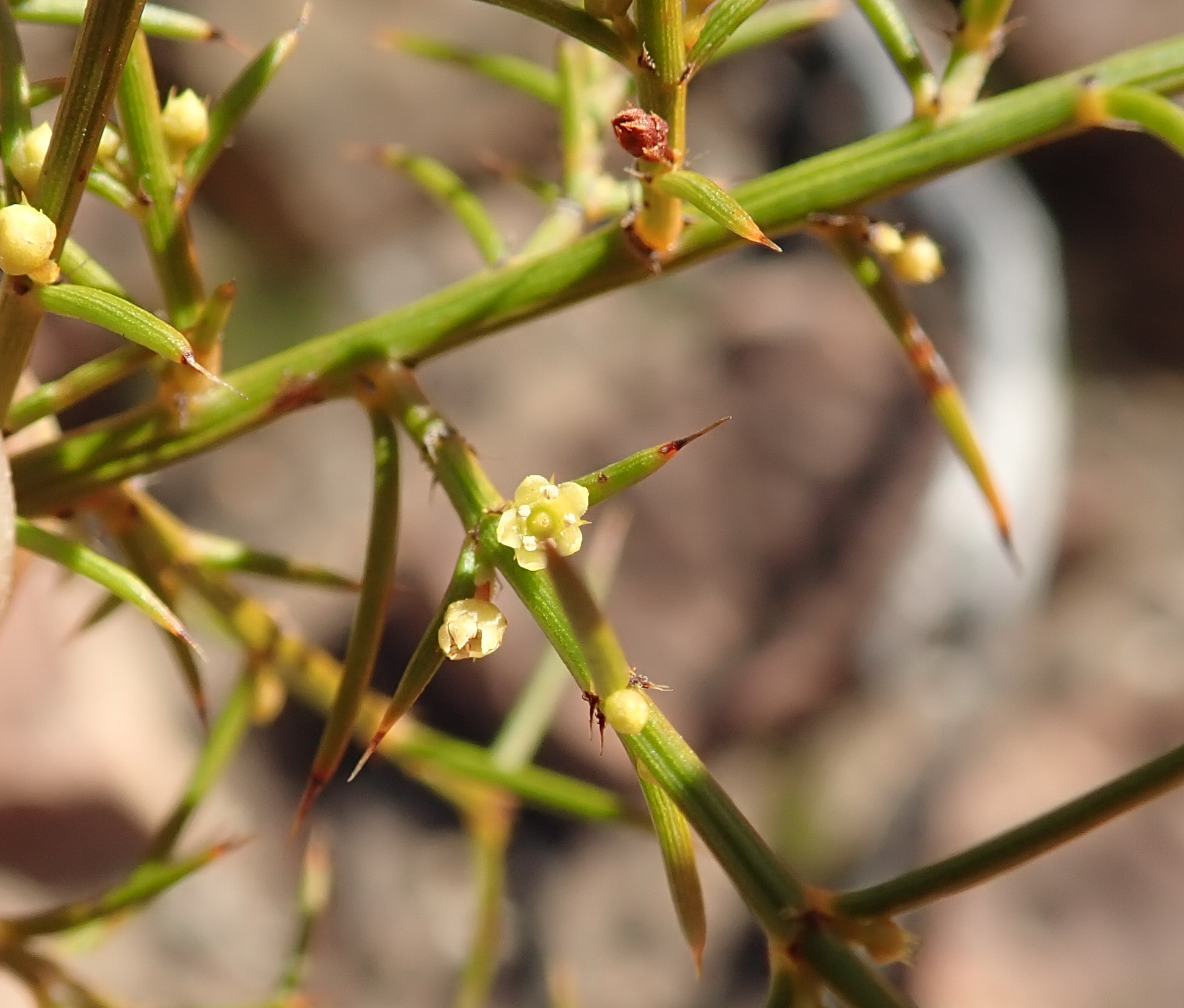
Flower

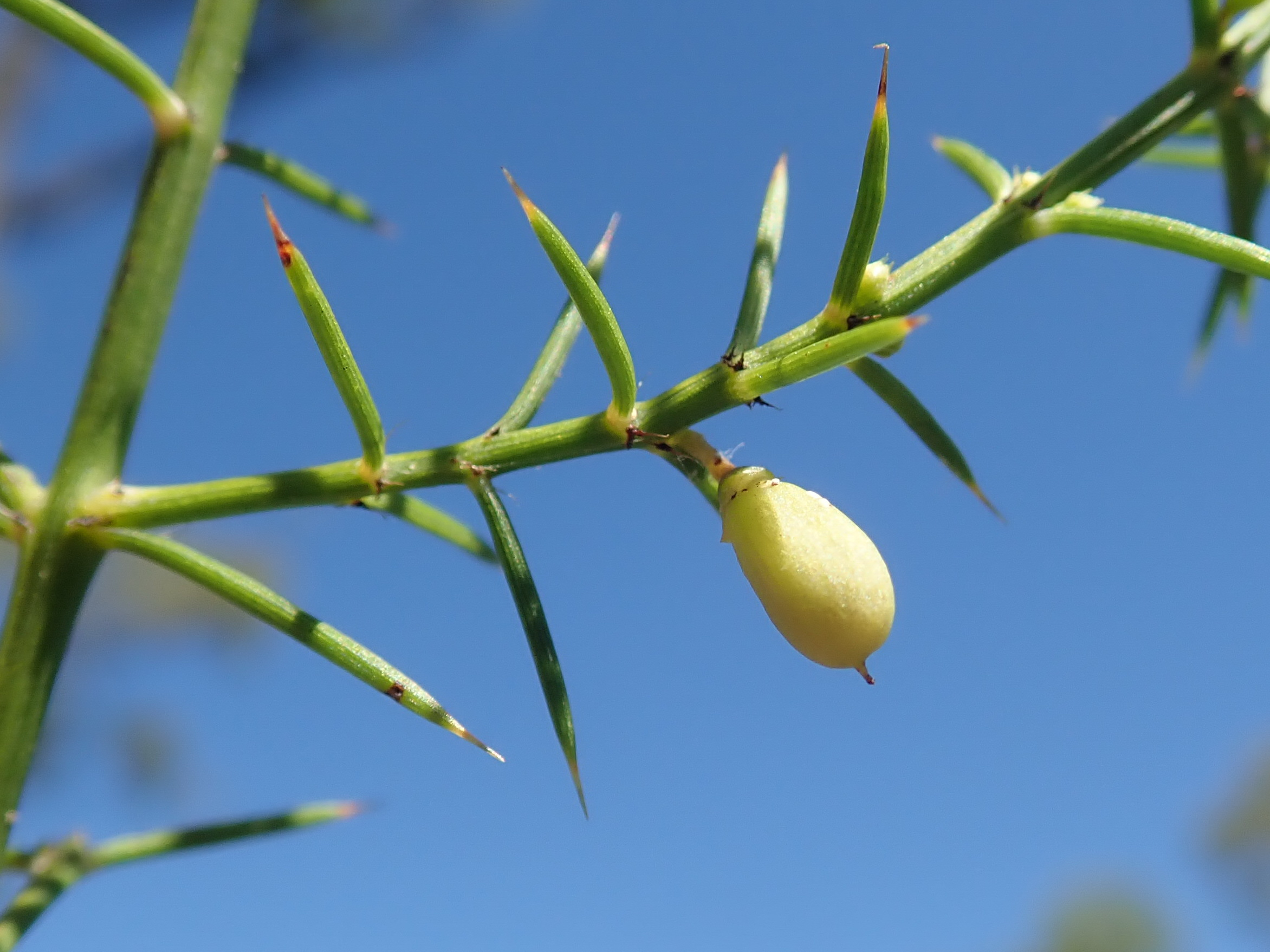
Fruit
