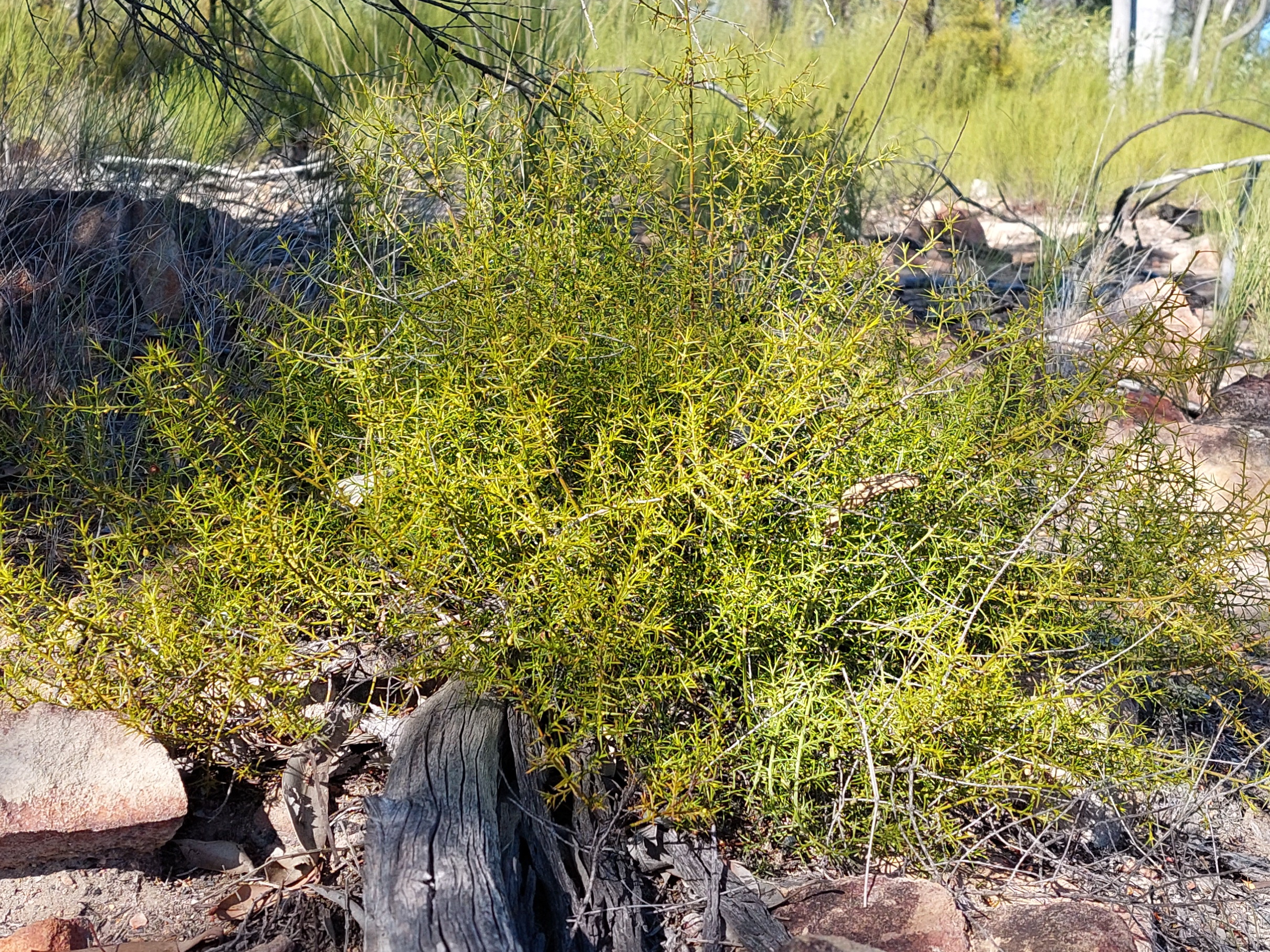
- Apatophyllum teretifolium

Scientific classification
- Kingdom: Plantae
- Clade: Tracheophytes
- Clade: Angiosperms
- Clade: Eudicots
- Clade: Rosids
- Order: Celastrales
- Family: Celastraceae
- Genus: Apatophyllum; McGill.

= Apatophyllum =

Genus of flowering plants

Apatophyllum is a genus of flowering plants belonging to the family Celastraceae.

Its native range is southwestern and eastern Australia.

Species:

- Apatophyllum constablei McGill.
- Apatophyllum flavovirens A.R.Bean & Jessup
- Apatophyllum macgillivrayi Cranfield & Lander
- Apatophyllum olsenii McGill.
- Apatophyllum teretifolium A.R.Bean & Jessup
