= Fairbairn Dam =

- Location of the dam wall in Queensland
- Country: Australia
- Location: southwest of Emerald, Central Queensland
- Coordinates: 23°39′00″S 148°03′56″E
- Purpose: Irrigation, water supply, flood mitigation
- Status: Operational
- Construction began: 1968
- Opening date: December 1972
- Operator: SunWater

Dam and spillways
- Type of dam: Earth fill dam
- Impounds: Nogoa River
- Height: 46 m (151 ft)
- Length: 823 m (2,700 ft)
- Dam volume: 5,249×10^{3} m^{3} (185.4×10^{6} cu ft)
- Spillway type: Uncontrolled
- Spillway capacity: 15,580 m^{3}/s (550,000 cu ft/s)

Reservoir
- Creates: Lake Maraboon
- Total capacity: 2,289,129 ML (5.03538×10^{11} imp gal; 6.04724×10^{11} US gal)
- Active capacity: 1,301,000 ML (2.86×10^{11} imp gal; 3.44×10^{11} US gal)
- Catchment area: 16,320 km^{2} (6,300 sq mi)
- Surface area: 15,000 ha (37,000 acres)
- Maximum water depth: 31.7 m (104 ft)
- Normal elevation: 204 m (669 ft) AHD

The Fairbairn Dam is an earth-filled embankment dam across the Nogoa River, located southwest of Emerald in Central Queensland, Australia. Constructed in 1972 for the primary purpose of irrigation, the impoundment created by the dam serves as one of the major potable water supplies for the region and assists with some flood mitigation.

Lake Maraboon with an active capacity of 1,301,000 ML (2.86×10^{11} imp gal; 3.44×10^{11} US gal) was formed by damming of the Nogoa River, and, in 2008, was Queensland's second largest dam. Its capacity is approximately three times larger than Sydney Harbour. Maraboon is the Aboriginal for "where the black ducks fly".

== Location and features ==
Commenced in 1968, the dam was engineered by Snowy Mountains Hydro-Electric Authority and completed in December 1972 for the purposes of irrigation and water storage. Storage of water commenced in January 1972 and the dam filled and overflowed for the first time two years later. The dam wall consists of a 5,249 thousand cubic metres (185.4×10^{6} cu ft) earthfill embankment 823 metres (2,700 ft) in length and 46 metres (151 ft) high. The reservoir has a catchment area of 16,320 square kilometres (6,300 sq mi) with an uncontrolled concrete spillway capable of discharging 15,580 cubic metres per second (550,000 cu ft/s). The reservoir has an active capacity of 1,301,000 ML (2.86×10^{11} imp gal; 3.44×10^{11} US gal) of water; When the dam spills over it flows into the Nogoa River.

About 300 irrigators are supplied with water for cotton, citrus and other horticulture operations. The dam is relatively shallow with large areas of standing timber. There are no boating restrictions and one concrete boat ramp.

Water from the Fairbairn Dam is released down the Nogoa River to the Selma Weir for supply to the town of Emerald. Supplies are diverted by pipelines to the towns of Blackwater, Bluff, Tieri, Dysart and Middlemount. Water from the dam also supplies coal mining developments on the Bowen Basin.

The dam and reservoir are operated by SunWater.

A 50th birthday celebration for the dam is being held on Saturday 21 May 2022 sponsored by Sunwater and the Central Highlands Regional Council.

== Water storage levels ==
In July 2003, cotton farmers who were reliant on the dam for irrigation had their water allocation cut by 75%. In November 2006, the dam had reached its lowest level ever—just 14% of total capacity. Over that summer low inflows and high evaporation rates had dropped levels to 12%.

On 18 January 2008 water in the reservoir overflowed the dam spillway for the first time in 17 years, due to heavy local rain. Within 48 hours, the water level was about 3.5 metres (11 ft) over the spillway level, or 156% of active capacity. The water level peaked at about 4.5 metres (15 ft) on 22 January 2008. Downstream 2,700 residents had to be evacuated due to flooding. Seven days earlier, the lake was operating at 29% of full capacity.

On 30 December 2010 during the 2010–11 Queensland floods, the Fairbairn Dam reached a peak of 2,289,129 ML (5.03538×10^{11} imp gal; 6.04724×10^{11} US gal), or 176% of active capacity, with a reservoir elevation of 209.81 metres (688.4 ft) AHD. Water was recorded at 5.58 metres (18.3 ft) above the spillway.

Dam capacities in Australia are frequently compared with the capacity of Sydney Harbour which holds approximately 500,000 megalitres (1.1×10^{11} imp gal; 1.3×10^{11} US gal). This would make the dam approximately 3 times the storage of Sydney Harbour in normal conditions and 4 times in extreme flood.

On 29 December 2019 the Fairbairn Dam was at 9.6% capacity, the previous record low capacity was in December 2006 at 11.8%. In December 2019 the Central Highlands Regional Council made the decision to stay on level 1 water restrictions whilst they were undertaking a review of their trigger levels for water restrictions. A record low of 7.39% was reached in 2020.

In late 2022, the dam reached 40% of capacity, allowing farmers to access full water allocations.

== Fishing ==
The lake has been stocked with barramundi, Mary River cod, southern saratoga, bass and silver perch. Eel-tailed catfish, spangled perch, red claw crayfish, sooty grunter and golden perch Georgia fish are additionally present. On the lake fishing is banned within 200 metres (660 ft) of the dam wall, while below the ban extends for 400 metres (1,300 ft).

== See also ==
- List of dams and reservoirs in Queensland
