= Isaac River =

Isaac
- Location of Isaac River mouth in Queensland
- Etymology: Frederick Nevil Isaac

Location
- Country: Australia
- State: Queensland
- Region: Central Queensland

Physical characteristics
- Source
  - location: below Moranbah North
  - coordinates: 21°27′03″S 148°11′40″E
  - elevation: 245 m (804 ft)
- Mouth: confluence with the MacKenzie River
  - coordinates: 22°52′19″S 149°20′01″E
  - elevation: 85 m (279 ft)
- Length: 457 km (284 mi)
- Basin size: 22,364 km^{2} (8,635 sq mi)

Basin features
- River system: Fitzroy River
- Tributaries
  - left: Connors River
- Waterbodies: Burton Gorge Dam

The Isaac River is a river and anabranch in Central Queensland, Australia.

== Course ==
The headwaters of the river rise south east of Glenden, Queensland and flow in a generally southern direction, crossing the Peak Downs Highway near Moranbah. It continues past Iffley and veers eastward at Leichhardt Downs forming a series of braided channels, and veers south east again and flows past the eastern edge of Junee State Forest and then discharges into the MacKenzie River of which it is a tributary.

The river has a catchment area of 22,364 square kilometres (8,635 sq mi) of which an area of 474 square kilometres (183 sq mi) is composed of riverine wetlands.

In 1992, the river was impounded by the Burton Gorge Dam, upstream of Moranbah, to create a reservoir of 20 million cubic metres (710×10^{6} cu ft) for the purposes of potable water supply.

== History ==
Yetimarala (also known as Jetimarala, Yetimaralla, and Bayali) is an Australian Aboriginal language of Central Queensland. Its traditional language region is within the local government areas of Central Highlands Region, on the Boomer Range and Broadsound Range and the Fitzroy River, Killarney Station, Mackenzie River and Isaac River.

The river was named for the pastoralist Frederick Nevil Isaac by the explorer Ludwig Leichhardt who came across the river during his 1845 expedition through the area to Port Essington (now Darwin). Isaac owned Gowrie Station on the Darling Downs and was a keen supporter of Leichhardt.

== See also ==
- List of rivers of Australia § Queensland
