= Connors River =

Connors
- Location of Connors River mouth in Queensland
- Etymology: In honour of Daniel Conner (sic.)

Location
- Country: Australia
- State: Queensland
- Region: Central Queensland

Physical characteristics
- Source: Chinaman Ridges, Great Dividing Range
- Source confluence: Collaroy Creek and Whelan Creek
  - location: east of Lotus Creek
  - coordinates: 22°01′39″S 149°10′21″E
  - elevation: 162 m (531 ft)
- Mouth: confluence with the Isaac River
  - location: northwest of Middlemount
  - coordinates: 22°48′47″S 149°04′04″E
  - elevation: 104 m (341 ft)
- Length: 301 km (187 mi)

Basin features
- Lagoons and waterholes: Boat Hole; Main Camp Lagoon; Lotus Creek; Lake Plattaway; Knobbys Waterhole

The Connors River is a river and anabranch in Central Queensland, Australia.

Formed by the confluence of the Collaroy Creek and Whelan Creek, east of the settlement of Lotus Creek, the headwaters of the river rise below the Chinaman Ridges in the Great Dividing Range. The river flows generally west past Mount Bridget where the river veers south and crosses the Marlborough-Sarina Road and then forms a series of braided channels and continues generally south by southwest. Crossing Bar Plains the river forms even more channels then discharges into the Isaac River at several locations north of the Junee National Park. From source to mouth, the river passes through a series of lagoons and waterholes including the Boat Hole, Main Camp Lagoon, Lotus Creek, Lake Plattaway and Knobbys Waterhole. The river descends 59 metres (194 ft) over its 301-kilometre (187 mi) course.

In February 2015 the Queensland Government approved a proposal to dam the river near Mount Bridgett, approximately 110 kilometres (68 mi) east of Moranbah. When complete, the dam will create a reservoir with an expected capacity of a 373,662 megalitres (8.22×10^{10} imp gal; 9.87×10^{10} US gal) to provide water for coal mines and communities in the area.

The river was named in honour of Daniel Conner, a pastoralist, by Augustus Gregory in 1856. Gregory was an explorer and Surveyor General of Queensland.

== See also ==
- List of rivers of Australia § Queensland
