= Comet, Queensland =

Comet
- Town
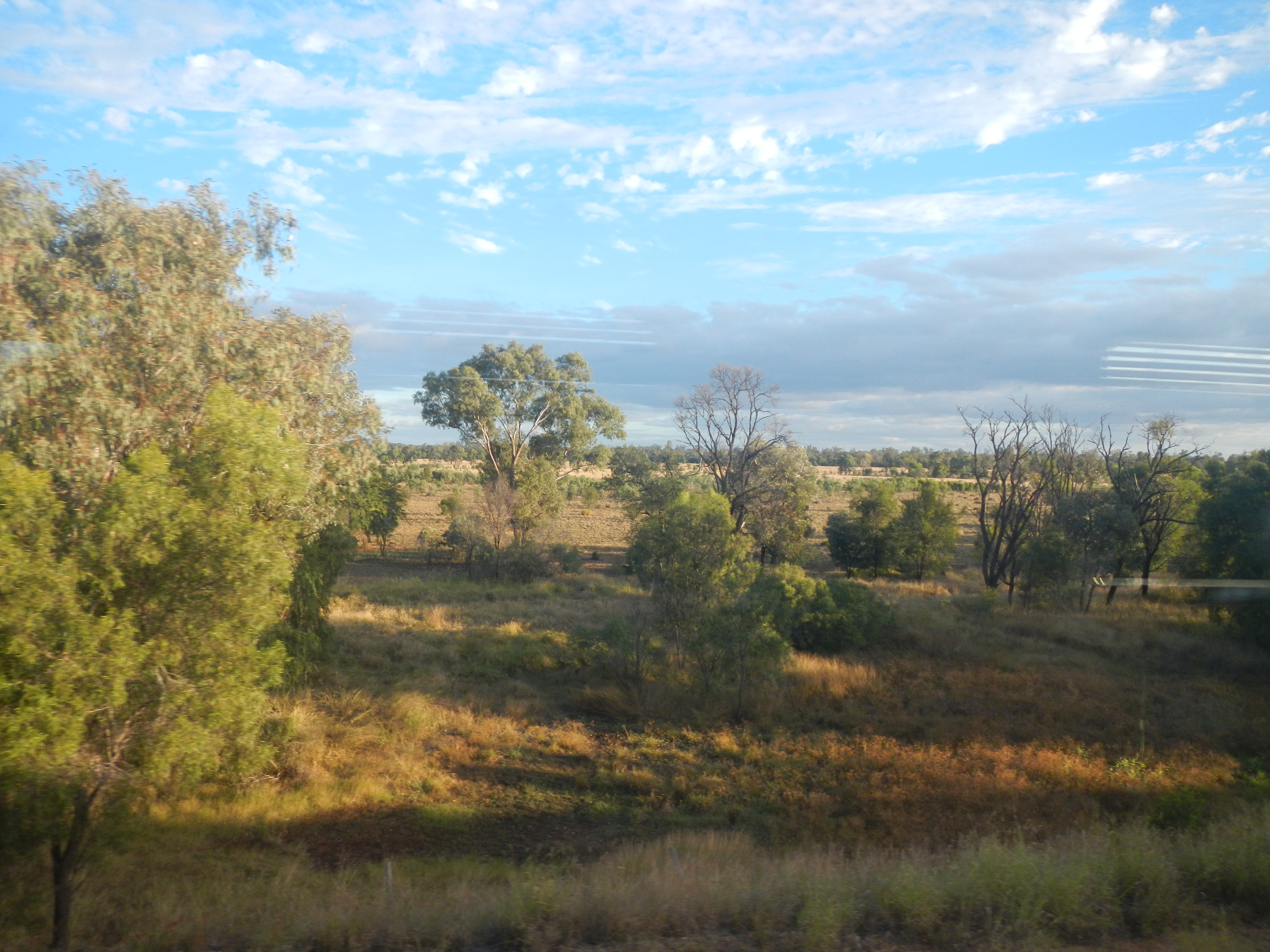
- Grazing land west of the town of Comet, 2013

- Interactive map of Comet
- Coordinates: 23.6041°S 148.5480°E
- Country: Australia
- State: Queensland
- LGA: Central Highlands Region
- Location: 41.0 km (25.5 mi) ESE of Emerald; 230 km (140 mi) W of Rockhampton; 841 km (523 mi) NW of Brisbane

Government
  - State electorate: Gregory
  - Federal division: Flynn

Area
  - Total: 1,756.8 km^{2} (678.3 sq mi)

Population
  - Total: 360 (2021 census)
  - Density: 0.2049/km^{2} (0.531/sq mi)
- Time zone: UTC+10:00 (AEST)
- Postcode: 4702
Localities around Comet
Wyuna	Mackenzie River	Blackwater
Emerald	Comet	Stewarton
Gindie	Arcturus	Togara

Comet is a rural town and locality in the Central Highlands Region, Queensland, Australia. In the 2021 census, the locality of Comet had a population of 360 people.

== Geography ==
Comet is the oldest town in the Emerald area, established at the confluence of the Comet River with the Nogoa River.

The town is located on the Capricorn Highway, 859 kilometres (534 mi) north west of the state capital, Brisbane.

The Central Western railway line enters the locality from the east (Blackwater / Stewarton), passes through the town, and exits to the west (Emerald). No passenger services stop at the local stations, which, with the exception of that at Yamala, whose use is being expanded as the CQ Inland Port, are not in use:

- Yamala railway station (23.5804°S 148.3719°E)
- Comet railway station, (23.6055°S 148.5475°E)
- Tolmies railway station (23.5921°S 148.7452°E)
- Burngrove railway station (23.5907°S 148.7555°E)

Ensham railway station (23.4664°S 148.5282°E) is in the north of the locality on the Blackwater railway system. It provides rail services to the Ensham coal mines operated by Idemitsu Australia.

The locality has a number of neighbourhoods (from north to south):

- Yamala (23.55°S 148.3666°E)
- Leichhardt Tree (23.5666°S 148.5333°E)
- Junction (23.6°S 148.75°E)

Mount Crocker is a mountain (23.5880°S 148.6391°E) in the east of the locality, rising to 248 metres (814 ft) above sea level.

The area around Comet supports cotton and grain production as well as cattle, both grazing and in feedlots.

== History ==
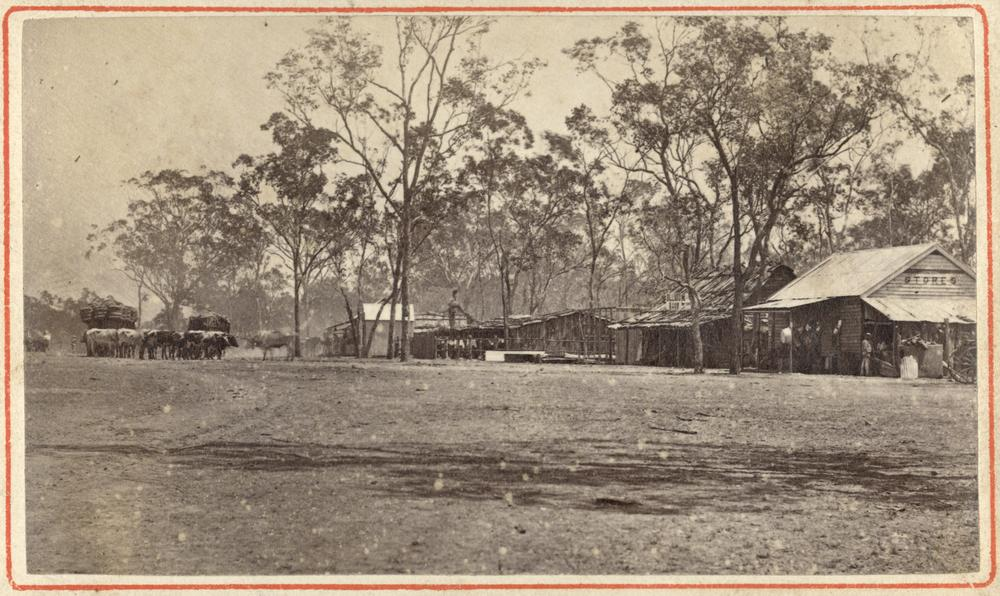
Township, circa 1878

Originally called Cometville, the town takes its name from the Comet River, named by explorer Ludwig Leichhardt, who made observations of Comet Wilmot (C/1844 Y2) in the area on 29 December 1844.

Comet Post Office opened on 5 September 1877.

Cometville State School opened on 23 October 1877. In 1912, it was renamed Comet State School in 1912.

On 19 March 1931, the town's name was changed from Cometville to Comet.

== Demographics ==
In the 2006 census, the locality of Comet had a population of 233 people.

In the 2016 census, the locality of Comet had a population of 498 people.

In the 2021 census, the locality of Comet had a population of 360 people.

== Education ==
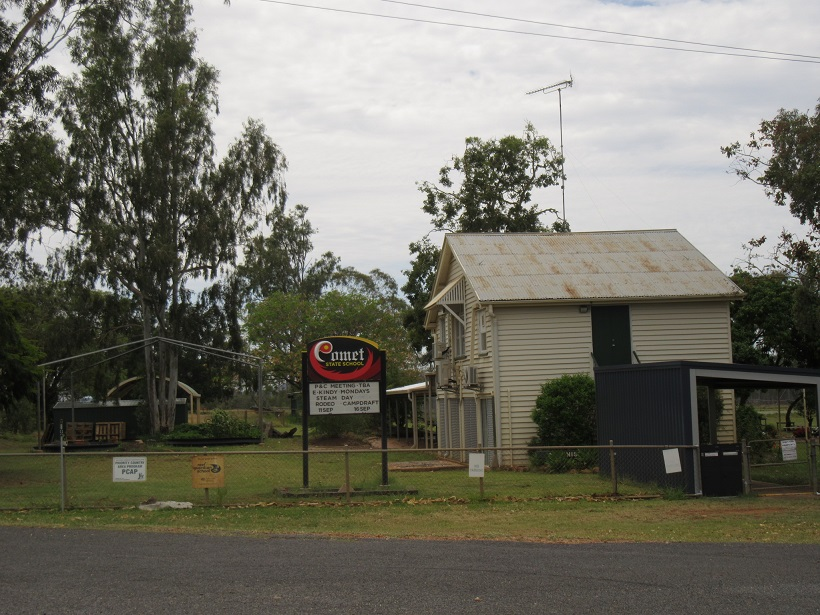
Comet State School, 2021

Comet State School is a government primary (Prep-6) school for boys and girls off the Capricorn Highway (23.6061°S 148.5451°E). In 2017, the school had an enrolment of 28 students with 5 teachers (3 full-time equivalent) and 4 non-teaching staff (2 full-time equivalent). In 2018, the school had an enrolment of 25 students with 5 teachers (3 full-time equivalent) and 5 non-teaching staff (2 full-time equivalent).

There are no secondary schools in Comet. The nearest government secondary school is Emerald State High School in neighbouring Emerald, situated 41 kilometres (25 miles) west of Comet.

== Attractions ==
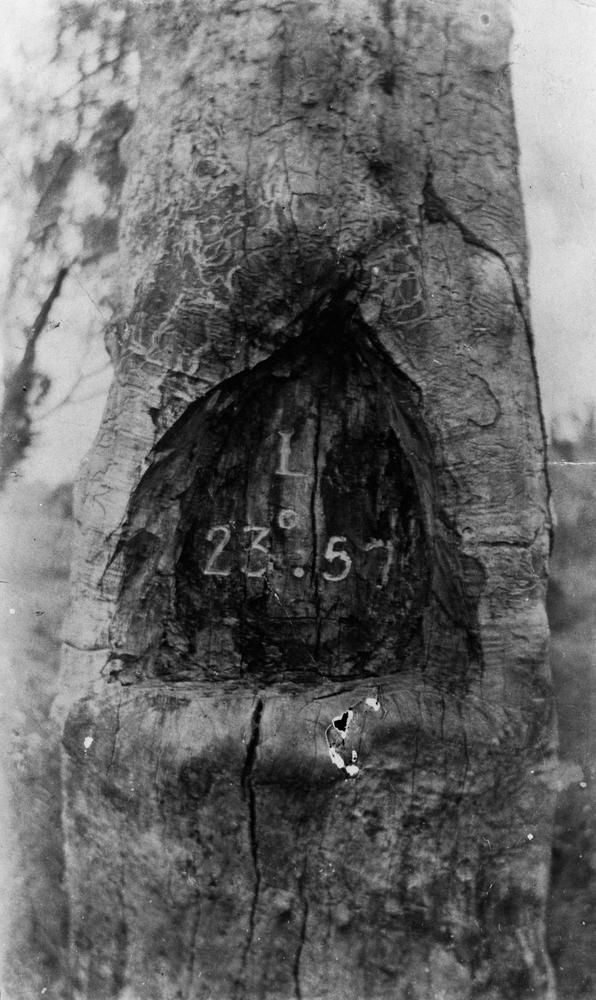
Leichhardt Tree with the impression L 23 degree 57, Comet River, 1927

Comet is home to the Leichhardt Tree, a "dig tree" established by Ludwig Leichhardt to indicate to others where he had buried food and journals.

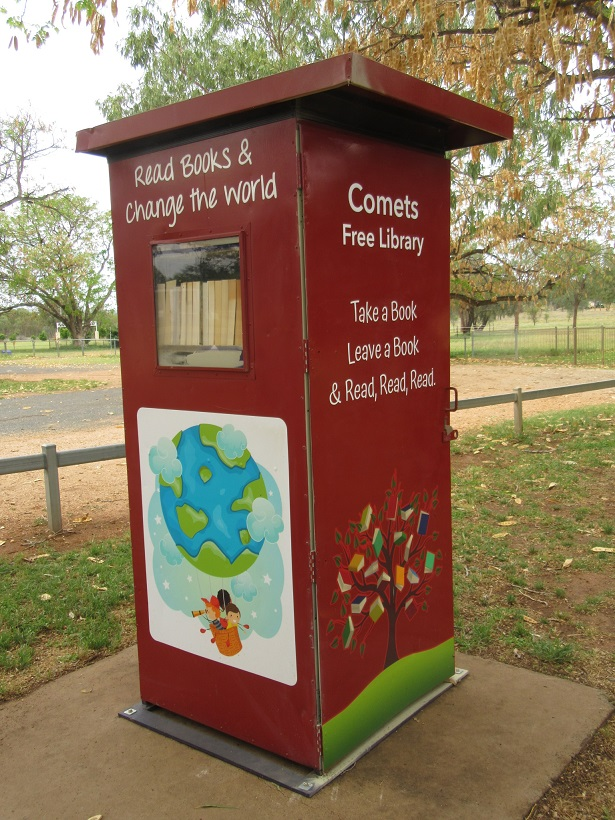
Comet Free Library 2021

There is a walking trail through the town visiting points of historic interest.
