= Comet River =

River in Queensland, Australia

Comet
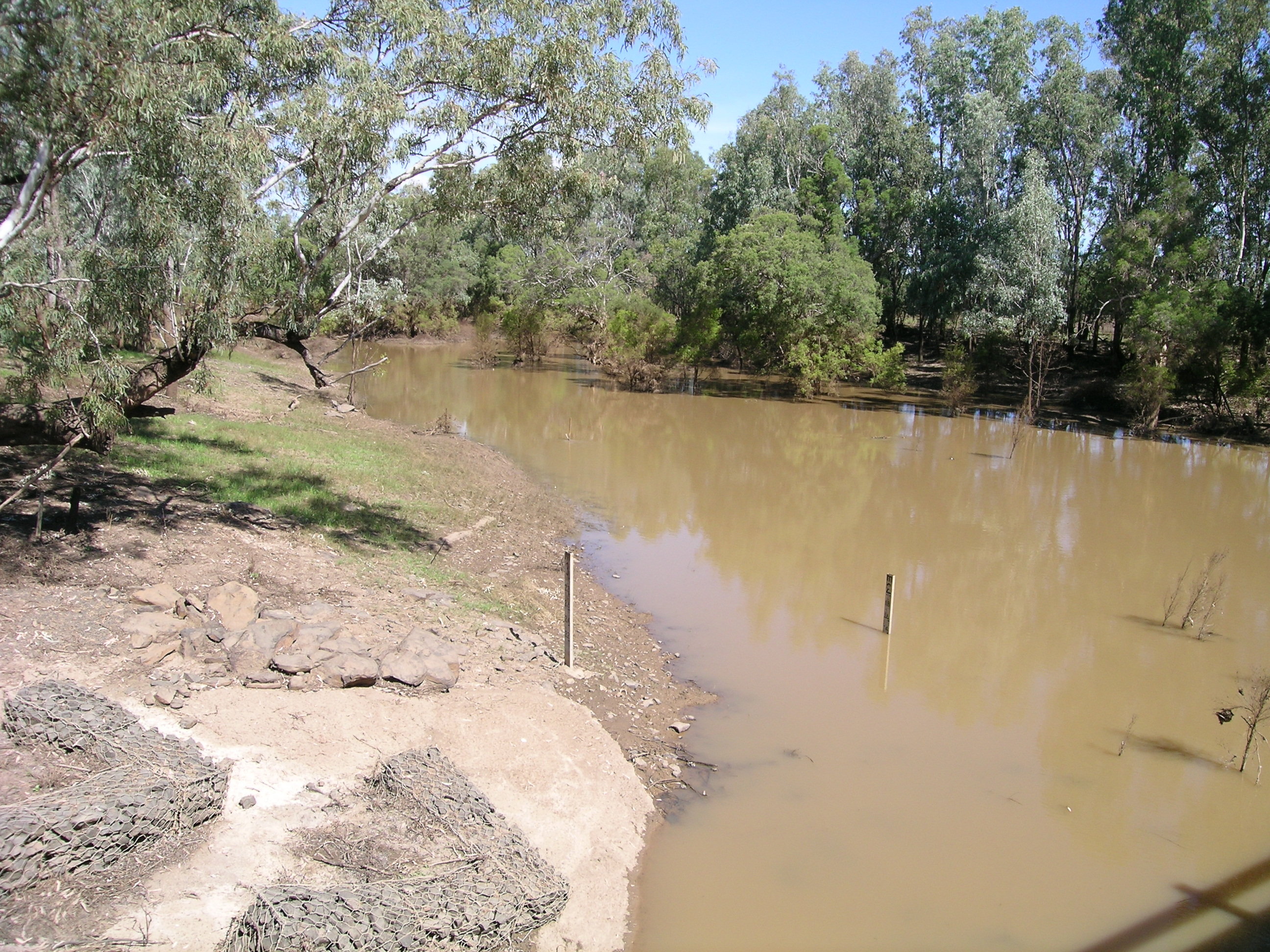
- The Comet River near Rolleston

- Location of Comet River mouth in Queensland

Location
- Country: Australia
- State: Queensland
- Region: Central Queensland
- Township: Rolleston; Comet

Physical characteristics
- Source: Expedition Range
- Source confluence: Brown River and Clematis Creek
  - location: south of Rolleston
  - coordinates: 24°43′40″S 148°43′30″E
  - elevation: 237 m (778 ft)
- Mouth: confluence with the Nogoa River to form the Mackenzie River
  - location: north of Comet
  - coordinates: 23°33′21″S 148°32′11″E
  - elevation: 144 m (472 ft)
- Length: 294 km (183 mi)
- Basin size: 16,460 km^{2} (6,360 mi^{2})

Basin features
- River system: Fitzroy River
- National park: Expedition National Park

The Comet River is a river in Central Queensland, Australia.

== Name ==
The Comet River was named by the explorer Ludwig Leichhardt on 29 December 1844 after one of his Indigenous Australian guides, Harry Brown, noticed a comet passing over their campsite during the evening. The expedition encountered a large group of local First Nations people while travelling along the river.

== Geography ==
Formed by the confluence of the Brown River and Clematis Creek, the Comet River rises in the Expedition Range, north of Expedition National Park and south of Rolleston. The river flows north, joined by seventeen tributaries, and splits as an anabranch on multiple occasions. The river flows through the Teatree Waterhole and Comet towards its confluence with the Nogoa River to form the Mackenzie River. The river descends 93 metres (305 ft) over its 294-kilometre (183 mi) course. The river is crossed by the Dawson Highway at Rolleston and the Capricorn Highway at Comet. The river traverses elevations between 144 and 1,243 m above mean sea level.

== Water management ==
The Comet River Weir is the main water storage facility on the river, with a surface area of 13 hectares (32 acres) when full. In the late 1990s the river was proposed as the site for the Starlee Dam 16km north of Rolleston. The dam with a capacity of up to 1.3 million megalitres would have inundated the town of Rolleston, but was scrapped by the Queensland Government due to "significant and severe impacts" on the environment.

== History ==
Wadja (also known as Wadjigu, Wadya, Wadjainngo, Mandalgu, and Wadjigun) is an Australian Aboriginal language in Central Queensland. The language region includes the local government areas of the Aboriginal Shire of Woorabinda and Central Highlands Region, including the Blackdown Tablelands. the Comet River, and the Expedition Range, and the towns of Woorabinda, Springsure and Rolleston.

== See also ==
- List of rivers of Australia § Queensland
