= Expedition Range =

Mountain range in Queensland, Australia

- Location within Queensland

Geography
- Country: Australia
- State: Queensland
- Region: Central Queensland
- Rivers: Comet River
- Range coordinates: 24°30′S 149°05′E

Expedition Range is a mountain range within the Central Highlands Region of Queensland, Australia.

Robinson Creek cuts a 100 metres deep gorge through sandstone clifflines. Many spectacular side gorges add to the appeal of the area, which is included in the Expedition National Park.

== Geography ==
The Comet River rises on the western slopes of the range and flows in a northerly direction towards Rolleston. The Dawson Highway crosses northern parts of the Expedition Range.

== Flora and fauna ==
The main trees and plants are eucalyptus open forests and woodlands. Cabbage Tree Palms are common along the creeks, while the lowlands contain pockets of brigalow and softwood scrubs.

The fauna of the area is similar to that of other Central Highland sandstone areas. Birds of the forest fringe are common, as are whiptail wallabies.

== History ==
Wadja (also known as Wadjigu, Wadya, Wadjainngo, Mandalgu, and Wadjigun) is an Australian Aboriginal language in Central Queensland. The language region includes the local government areas of the Aboriginal Shire of Woorabinda and Central Highlands Region, including the Blackdown Tablelands. the Comet River, and the Expedition Range, and the towns of Woorabinda, Springsure and Rolleston.

== In culture ==
The range featured in the culmination of Landscape of Farewell, a 2007 novel penned by Alex Miller.

== See also ==
- List of mountains in Australia
