= Expedition National Park =

National park in Queensland, Australia

- IUCN category II (national park)
- Location within Queensland
- Location: Queensland
- Coordinates: 25°07′44″S 148°51′56″E
- Area: 1,080 km^{2} (420 sq mi)
- Established: 1991
- Governing body: Queensland Parks and Wildlife Service
- Website: Official website

Expedition is a national park in Queensland, Australia, 490 km northwest of Brisbane. It is named for the Expedition Range of mountains.

The park is part of the Brigalow Belt bioregion. This area is mostly dominated by dry eucalyptus forests.

Robinson Gorge was the first section to be declared a national park in 1951.

== Wildlife ==
145 species of animals have been recorded in the park, 2 of which are on the list of endangered or rare species and 283 species of plants, of which 2 also belong to rare or endangered species.

== See also ==
- Protected areas of Queensland
