= Blackdown Tableland National Park =

National park in Queensland, Australia

- IUCN category II (national park)
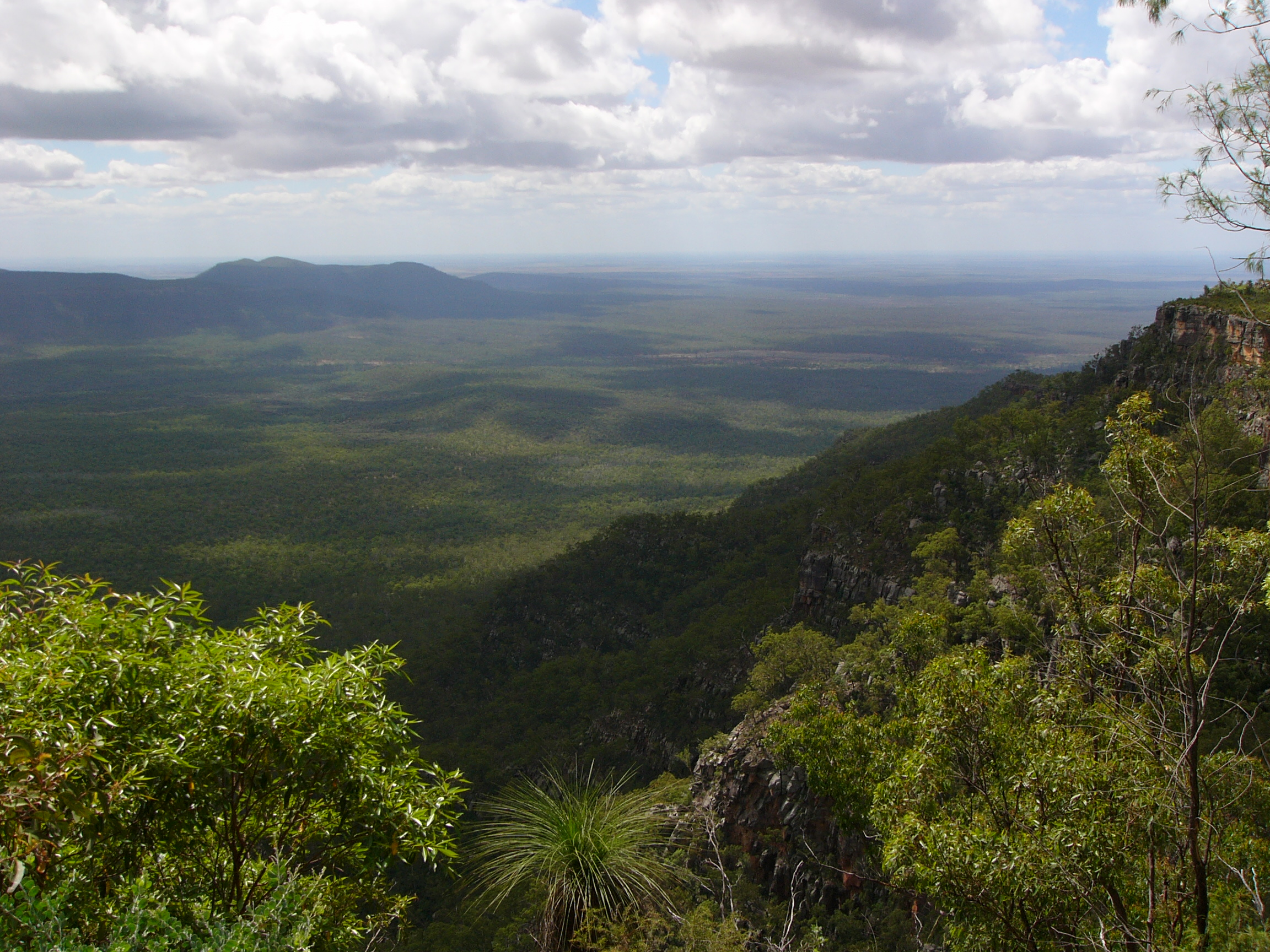
- View from the top of Blackdown Tableland

- Location within Queensland
- Location: Queensland
- Nearest city: Dingo
- Coordinates: 23°43′25″S 149°03′37″E
- Area: 320 km^{2} (120 sq mi)
- Established: 1991
- Governing body: Queensland Parks and Wildlife Service
- Website: http://www.nprsr.qld.gov.au/parks/blackdown-tableland

Blackdown Tableland is a national park in the Central Highlands Region, Queensland, Australia.

== Geography ==
The park is in Central Queensland, 576 km (358 mi) northwest of Brisbane. The mountainous terrain of the tablelands provides a unique landscape featuring gorges, waterfalls and diverse vegetation.

The Blackdown Tableland is a 900 m (3,000 ft) sandstone plateau rising abruptly from the plains below. Many creeks on the Tableland have developed gorges and waterfalls along their courses, the most notable of which drains in to the spectacular Rainbow Falls (Gudda Gumoo) over a 40 m (130 ft) drop. Some of the creeks on the Tableland are catchment fed by rain and often dry up, and some are spring fed and always flow even just a small amount. The national park is located in the north east of the central Queensland sandstone belt.

The tablelands are positioned at the junction of the Shotover, Expedition and Dawson Ranges. Evidence of folding is shown in the rises and depressions amongst the ranges.

== History ==
It is the traditional home of the Ghungalu people, whose rock art can be found in the park.

Wadja (also known as Wadjigu, Wadya, Wadjainngo, Mandalgu, and Wadjigun) is an Australian Aboriginal language in Central Queensland. The language region includes the local government areas of the Aboriginal Shire of Woorabinda and Central Highlands Region, including Blackdown Tableland, the Comet River, and the Expedition Range, and the towns of Woorabinda, Springsure and Rolleston.

== Climate ==
The plateau has a more temperate, local climate than the surrounding plains, supporting open forests, heath, ferns, and a variety of plants and animals, several of which are not found anywhere else. Parts of the eastern tablelands have an average rainfall of 1,500 mm (59 in) per year. Dense fog may shroud the plateau.

== Facilities ==
Camping is permitted at Munall campground. There are walking tracks leading to lookouts, heritage sites and creeks. Picnic facilities are available at Yaddamen Dhina lookout.

Camping is available on Mimosa Creek in the Tableland, camping fees apply.

== Access ==
Access to the area was very limited until a road was constructed in 1969 by the Queensland Forest Department. Entrance to the park is via a turn-off 11 km (6.8 mi) west of Dingo along the Capricorn Highway.

== See also ==
- Protected areas of Queensland
