= Central Queensland =

- Region
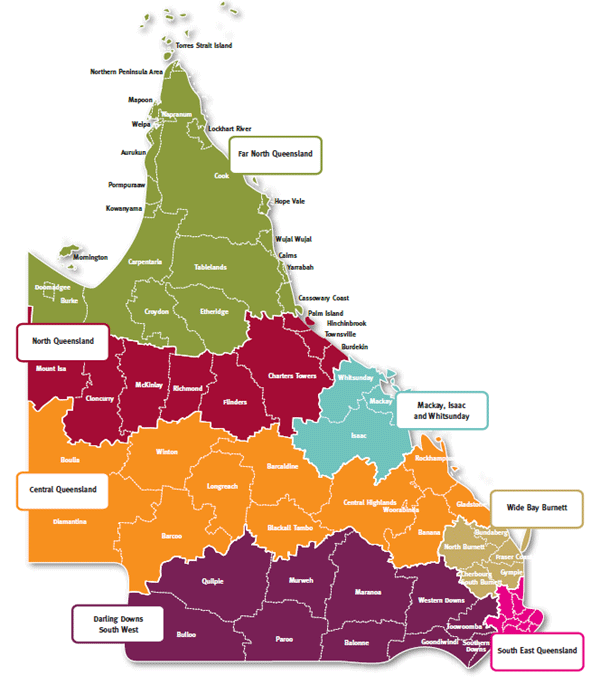
- The Regions of Queensland

- Coordinates: 23.44°S 144.88°E
- Country: Australia
- State: Queensland
- LGA: Banana; Central Highlands; Gladstone; Isaac; Livingstone; Rockhampton; Woorabinda

Government
  - State electorate: Rockhampton; Bundaberg; Gladstone; Burnett; Hervey Bay
  - Federal division: Capricornia

Population
  - Total: 233,931 (2011 census)

Central Queensland is an imprecisely defined geographical division of Queensland (a state in Australia) that centres on the eastern coast, around the Tropic of Capricorn. Its major regional centre is Rockhampton. The region extends from the Capricorn Coast west to the Central Highlands at Emerald, north to the Mackay Regional Council southern boundary, and south to Gladstone. The region is also known as Capricornia. It is one of Australia's main coal exporting regions.

At the 2011 Australian Census the region recorded a total population from the six local government areas of 233,931.

== Industry ==
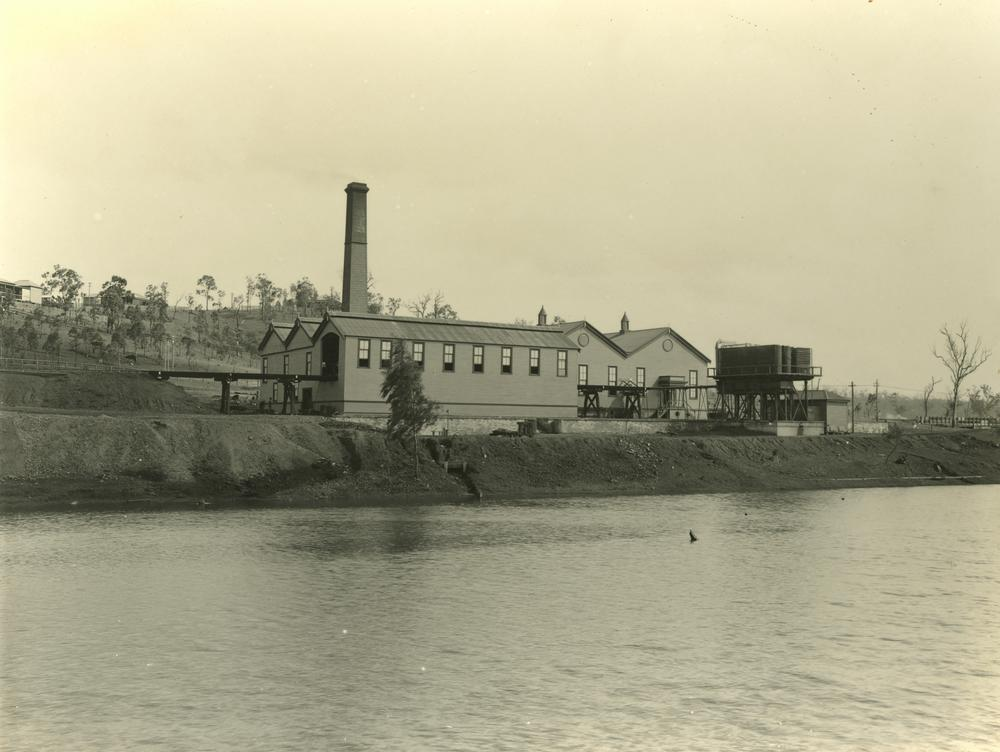
Gold processing plant at Mount Morgan, 1903

Economically, Central Queensland is an important centre of primary sector industries, particularly for food and fibre production. Central Queensland includes the Bowen Basin which is rich in high quality coking coal, the Port of Gladstone produces 40% of the state's export earnings, the Fitzroy River is the second-largest river system in Australia and commands significant water resources such as Fairbairn Dam. Gladstone has a significant aluminium smelter.

=== Beef ===
Rockhampton is claimed to be the beef capital of Australia, a title which is disputed by Casino in New South Wales. Beef production in the region is centred on Brigalow and speargrass land types. Every three years, Rockhampton holds the national Beef Australia exposition to celebrate the cattle industry as well as to facilitate trade opportunities for Australian beef producers.

=== Mining ===
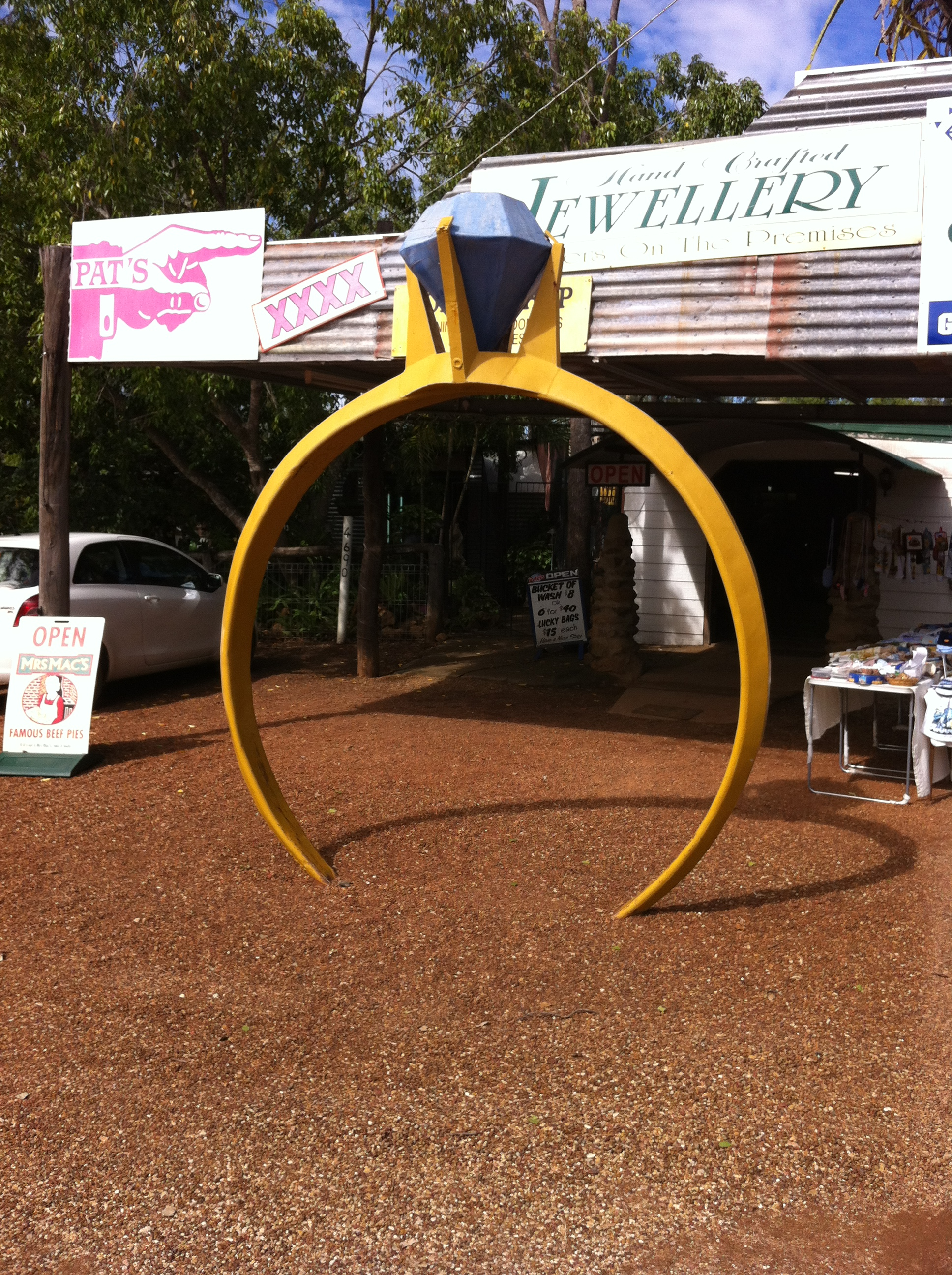
The Big Sapphire Ring, Sapphire, 2012

Central Queensland is one of the world's leading producers and exporters of black coal. Ludwig Leichhardt was the first European to discover coal deposits in the region in 1845. In the 2011–2012 financial year the region produced 40% of the state's total coal production.

Coal is extracted from the Bowen Basin and transported to port facilities at Port of Gladstone via the Blackwater railway system or to both Hay Point and Abbot Point via the Goonyella railway line. Coal mining is expanding west into the Galilee Basin and requires an extension of the Goonyella line to transport coal to port. Many mines in the region, particularly those within the Fitzroy River basin, were severely impacted by flooding during the 2010–11 Queensland floods.

Gold, silver, limestone, coal seam gas, magnesite and gemstones are also mined. Sapphires were discovered here in 1875. Gold was discovered in the Mount Morgan region around 1865. Mount Morgan Mine has since gone on to become one of Australia's richest mines.

Purpose-built mining towns in Central Queensland include Dysart, Middlemount, Moranbah, Mount Morgan and Moura. Three mining disaster have occurred at Moura since 1975, resulting in the loss of 36 lives.

=== Citrus canker outbreak ===
In 2004, an orchard on Evergreen farm was the site of the first detection of citrus canker in Central Queensland. A significant part of the citrus growing industry was devastated when a total of 6,000 acres (24 km^{2}) of crop had to be destroyed so the disease would not spread across the country. In 2005 several fresh outbreaks were reported so the eradication expanded to include private backyard trees. The outbreak's cause has not been fully explained despite a federal inquiry. In 2009 authorities from the Government of Queensland declared the eradication program complete.

== Protected areas ==
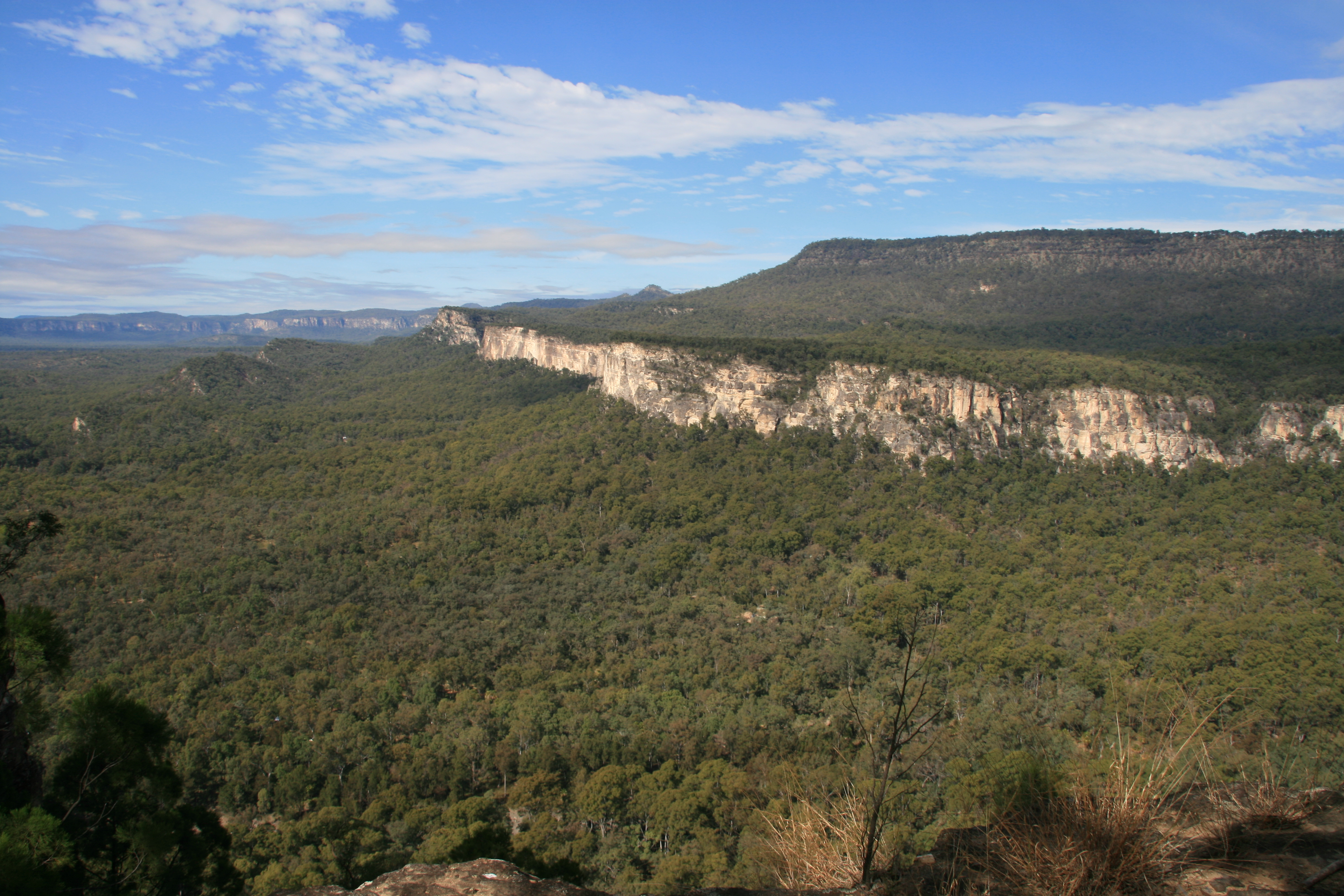
Carnarvon Gorge from Boolimba Bluff, 2010

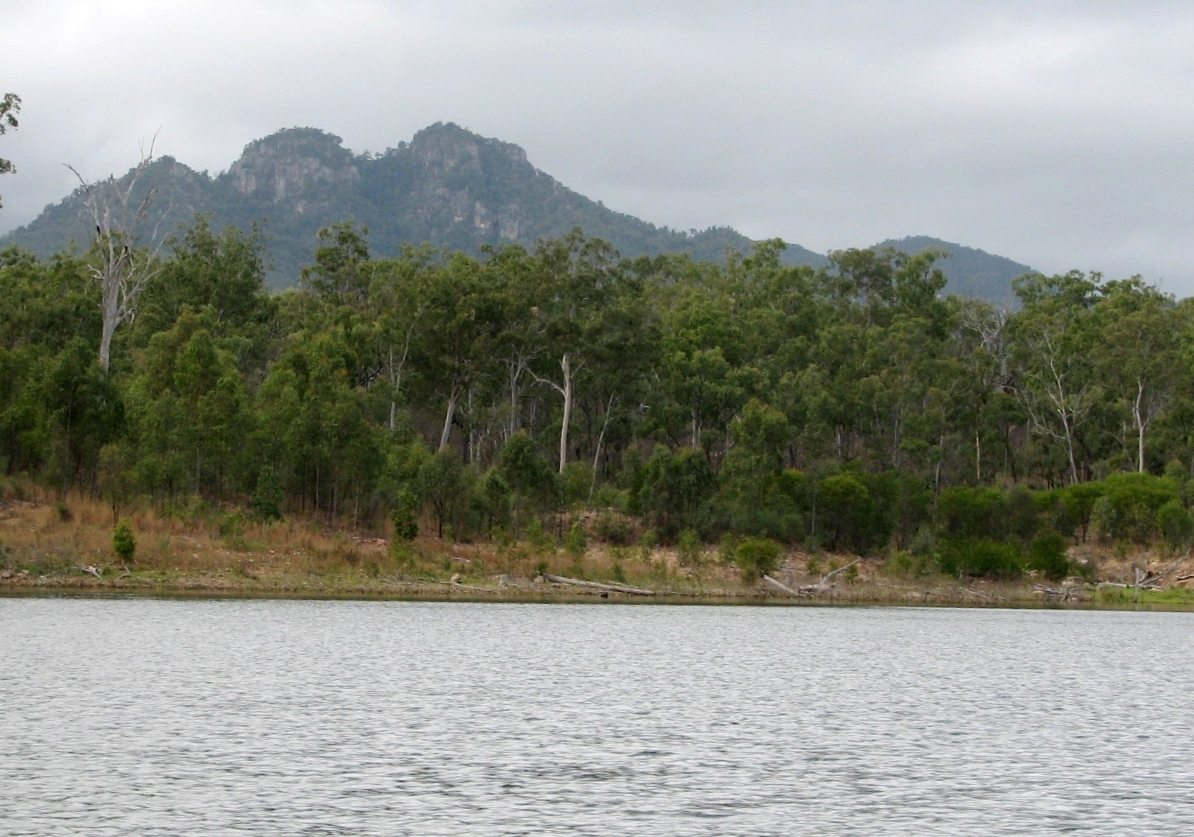
Mount Castletower and Lake Awoonga

The region contain 33 national parks. Great Keppel Island has been an island tourist attraction since the 1960s. It and several other islands in the area are surrounded by coral reefs. In the west of the region is Queensland's central highlands and the Carnarvon Gorge, which is protected within the Carnarvon National Park. Carnarvon Gorge features white sandstone cliffs, steep-sided gorges a diverse range of significant plant and animal species and many walking tracks. Kroombit Tops National Park provides habitat for the endemic Kroombit tinker frog. Deepwater National Park is good place for turtle watching. From November to March three species of turtle lay their eggs on beaches protected within the park.

== Communities ==
For this purpose the area of Central Queensland was restricted to the areas encircled by the Dawson Highway between Gladstone and Springsure; the Gregory Highway between Springsure and Clermont, and the Peak Downs Highway between Clermont and enters North Queensland via Mackay – extended right to the eastern coastline.

Major cities in the region are Emerald, Gladstone and Rockhampton. Some communities on the Capricorn Coast include Byfield, Yeppoon, Great Keppel Island, Emu Park and Cawarral.

== History ==
Gungabula (also known as Kongabula and Khungabula) is an Australian Aboriginal language of the headwaters of the Dawson River in Central Queensland. The language region includes areas within the local government area of Maranoa Region, particularly the towns of Charleville, Augathella and Blackall and as well as the Carnarvon Range.

Wadja (also known as Wadjigu, Wadya, Wadjainngo, Mandalgu, and Wadjigun) is an Australian Aboriginal language in Central Queensland. The language region includes the local government areas of the Aboriginal Shire of Woorabinda and Central Highlands Region, including the Blackdown Tablelands. the Comet River, and the Expedition Range, and the towns of Woorabinda, Springsure and Rolleston.

Yagalingu (also known as Jagalingu, Auanbura, Kokleburra, Owanburra, Kowanburra, Wagalbara, and Djagalingu) is an Australian Aboriginal language of Central Queensland. Its traditional language region was within the local government area of Isaac Region, from the headwaters of the Belyando River south to Avoca, north to Laglan, west to the Great Dividing Range, and east and south to Drummond Range.

Yambina (also known as Jambina and Jambeena) is an Australian Aboriginal language of Central Queensland. Its traditional language region is the local government area of Central Highlands Region, including Peak Downs, Logan Creek, south to Avon Downs, east to Denham Range and Logan Downs, west to Elgin Downs and at Solferino.

Yetimarala (also known as Jetimarala, Yetimaralla, and Bayali) is an Australian Aboriginal language of Central Queensland. Its traditional language region is within the local government areas of Central Highlands Region, on the Boomer Range and Broadsound Range and the Fitzroy River, Killarney Station, Mackenzie River and Isaac River.

In 1889 Central Queenslanders in Rockhampton established the Central Queensland Territorial Separation League with the hopes of turning Central Queensland into its own state. The core argument of secessionist movement was that the seat of government, Brisbane was in the south-east corner of the State. It was so far removed from substantial portions of the state that these areas and their citizens were left disadvantaged and neglected as political and economic interests focused on the south. Supplementing the Central Queensland Territorial Separation League, the women of Rockhampton established their own separation league in October 1892. Their main focus was preparing a petition to Queen Victoria. The introductory text set out their grievances and described the immense size of Queensland: being twelve times the area of England and Wales, and larger than France, Germany, Spain and Portugal combined.

== Education ==
Central Queensland University has a campus at Emerald, Gladstone and Rockhampton.

== Transport ==
The region is served by these airports:

- Gladstone Airport
- Longreach Airport
- Rockhampton Airport

== Media ==
Radio stations that broadcast to the region are:

- ABC Capricornia serving Rockhampton, Gladstone and the Capricorn Coast (part of ABC Local Radio)
- ABC Western Queensland serving Longreach and western parts of region (part of ABC Local Radio)
- Hit Central Queensland region-wide (commercial)
- 4CC region-wide (commercial)
- Triple M Central Queensland region-wide (commercial)
- 4RO region-wide (commercial)
- 4RGL serving Gladstone (community)
- 4YOU serving Rockhampton (community)
- 4US serving Rockhampton (community)
- 4LG serving Longreach (community)

== Library Service ==
The Central Highlands Regional Council operates the following library branches:

- Emerald Library
- The Gemfields library
- Blackwater Library
- Dingo Library
- Duaringa Library
- Capella Library
- Tieri Library
- Springsure Library
- Rolleston Library
- Bauhinia Library

== See also ==
- Central West Queensland
- Regions of Queensland
- Central Queensland Territorial Separation League
