= Electoral results for the district of Gregory =

Queensland, Australia, district election results

This is a list of electoral results for the electoral district of Gregory in Queensland state elections.

== Members for Gregory ==
Member	Party	Term
Charles Lumley Hill		1878–1882
Thomas McWhannell		1882–1888
William Henry Corfield	Ministerial	1888–1899
William Hamilton	Labor	1899–1915
George Pollock	Labor	1915–1939
Charles Brown	Independent	1939–1941
George Devries	Labor	1941–1957
George Devries	Queensland Labor	1957
Wally Rae	Country	1957–1974
Bill Glasson	National	1974–1989
Vaughan Johnson	National	1989–2008
Vaughan Johnson	Liberal National	2008–2015
Lachlan Millar	Liberal National	2015–2024
Sean Dillon	Liberal National	2024–present

== Election results ==
=== Elections in the 2020s ===
2024 Queensland state election: Gregory
Party	Candidate	Votes	%	±%
Liberal National	Sean Dillon	12,249	57.38	+3.18
Labor	Rebecca Humphreys	4,486	21.01	−3.79
One Nation	Michael Ellison	2,977	13.94	+0.14
Family First	John Campbell	993	4.65	+4.65
Greens	Ell-Leigh Ackerman	644	3.02	+0.22
Total formal votes		21,349	96.85	−0.43
Informal votes		694	3.15	+0.43
Turnout		22,043	83.90	−1.84
Two-party-preferred result
Liberal National	Sean Dillon	15,167	71.04	+3.84
Labor	Rebecca Humphreys	6,182	28.96	−3.84
Liberal National hold		Swing	+3.84	

2020 Queensland state election: Gregory
Party	Candidate	Votes	%	±%
Liberal National	Lachlan Millar	11,197	54.16	+8.90
Labor	Dave Kerrigan	5,121	24.77	+3.83
One Nation	Clint Rothery	2,861	13.84	−10.38
Greens	Paul Bambrick	580	2.81	−0.25
Civil Liberties & Motorists	Bruce Currie	370	1.79	+1.79
United Australia	Thomas Turner	288	1.39	+1.39
Informed Medical Options	Tania Kiara	256	1.24	+1.24
Total formal votes		20,673	97.28	+0.51
Informal votes		577	2.72	−0.51
Turnout		21,250	85.74	−2.01
Two-party-preferred result
Liberal National	Lachlan Millar	13,902	67.25	+3.00
Labor	Dave Kerrigan	6,771	32.75	−3.00
Liberal National hold		Swing	+3.00	

=== Elections in the 2010s ===
2017 Queensland state election: Gregory
Party	Candidate	Votes	%	±%
Liberal National	Lachlan Millar	9,556	45.3	−0.8
One Nation	Mark Higgins	5,113	24.2	+24.1
Labor	Dave Kerrigan	4,422	20.9	−5.3
Independent	Bruce Currie	1,376	6.5	+1.1
Greens	Norman Weston	645	3.1	+1.1
Total formal votes		21,112	96.8	−1.5
Informal votes		703	3.2	+1.5
Turnout		21,815	87.7	−7.0
Two-candidate-preferred result
Liberal National	Lachlan Millar	13,499	63.9	+3.0
One Nation	Mark Higgins	7,613	36.1	+36.1
Liberal National hold		Swing	+3.0	

2015 Queensland state election: Gregory
Party	Candidate	Votes	%	±%
Liberal National	Lachlan Millar	10,987	46.38	−12.72
Labor	Cheryl Thompson	6,249	26.38	+8.87
Katter's Australian	Ross Stockham	2,388	10.08	−6.92
Palmer United	Michael Linton-Helliar	2,236	9.44	+9.44
Independent	Bruce Currie	1,370	5.78	+2.12
Greens	Norm Weston	457	1.93	−0.79
Total formal votes		23,687	98.21	−0.21
Informal votes		432	1.79	+0.21
Turnout		24,119	90.92	+1.06
Two-party-preferred result
Liberal National	Lachlan Millar	12,342	61.07	−14.40
Labor	Cheryl Thompson	7,866	38.93	+14.40
Liberal National hold		Swing	−14.40	

2012 Queensland state election: Gregory
Party	Candidate	Votes	%	±%
Liberal National	Vaughan Johnson	13,399	59.10	−2.71
Labor	Jack O'Brien	3,970	17.51	−16.00
Katter's Australian	Pauline Williams	3,855	17.00	+17.00
Independent	Bruce Currie	831	3.67	+3.67
Greens	Norman Weston	617	2.72	−1.96
Total formal votes		22,672	98.42	−0.25
Informal votes		364	1.58	+0.25
Turnout		23,036	89.86	−1.90
Two-party-preferred result
Liberal National	Vaughan Johnson	14,895	75.48	+11.22
Labor	Jack O'Brien	4,840	24.52	−11.22
Liberal National hold		Swing	+11.22	

=== Elections in the 2000s ===
2009 Queensland state election: Gregory
Party	Candidate	Votes	%	±%
Liberal National	Vaughan Johnson	14,054	61.8	+5.5
Labor	Fabian Webber	7,619	33.5	−1.2
Greens	Carla Dalton	1,063	4.7	+4.7
Total formal votes		22,736	98.6	
Informal votes		306	1.4	
Turnout		23,042	91.8	
Two-party-preferred result
Liberal National	Vaughan Johnson	14,260	64.3	+2.3
Labor	Fabian Webber	7,932	35.7	−2.3
Liberal National hold		Swing	+2.3	

2006 Queensland state election: Gregory
Party	Candidate	Votes	%	±%
National	Vaughan Johnson	10,105	60.0	−2.0
Labor	Shane Guley	4,691	27.9	−2.3
Family First	Ross Grierson	1,102	6.5	+6.5
Independent	Julie-Anne Evans	930	5.5	+5.5
Total formal votes		16,828	98.6	+0.2
Informal votes		245	1.4	−0.2
Turnout		17,073	91.0	−0.8
Two-party-preferred result
National	Vaughan Johnson	10,767	68.0	+0.6
Labor	Shane Guley	5,076	32.0	−0.6
National hold		Swing	+0.6	

2004 Queensland state election: Gregory
Party	Candidate	Votes	%	±%
National	Vaughan Johnson	10,674	62.0	+2.7
Labor	Shane Guley	5,204	30.2	−10.5
One Nation	Ian Espie	1,334	7.8	+7.8
Total formal votes		17,212	98.4	+1.1
Informal votes		286	1.6	−1.1
Turnout		17,498	91.8	−1.2
Two-party-preferred result
National	Vaughan Johnson	11,155	67.4	+8.1
Labor	Shane Guley	5,404	32.6	−8.1
National hold		Swing	+8.1	

2001 Queensland state election: Gregory
Party	Candidate	Votes	%	±%
National	Vaughan Johnson	10,047	59.3	+16.0
Labor	Scott McDonell	6,897	40.7	+11.9
Total formal votes		16,944	97.3	
Informal votes		476	2.7	
Turnout		17,420	93.0	
National hold		Swing	−2.8	

=== Elections in the 1990s ===
1998 Queensland state election: Gregory
Party	Candidate	Votes	%	±%
National	Vaughan Johnson	6,873	46.7	−22.2
Labor	Donna O'Donoghue	4,228	28.7	−2.4
One Nation	Allan Bahr	2,554	17.4	+17.4
Australia First	Ron Crozier	640	4.4	+4.4
Democrats	Rebecca Hack	303	2.1	+2.1
Shooters	Frank Taylor	110	0.7	+0.7
Total formal votes		14,708	99.0	+0.5
Informal votes		142	1.0	−0.5
Turnout		14,850	93.9	+1.6
Two-party-preferred result
National	Vaughan Johnson	8,553	63.1	−5.8
Labor	Donna O'Donoghue	5,006	36.9	+5.8
National hold		Swing	−5.8	

1995 Queensland state election: Gregory
Party	Candidate	Votes	%	±%
National	Vaughan Johnson	9,809	68.9	+8.7
Labor	Jamie Lonsdale	4,428	31.1	−8.7
Total formal votes		14,237	98.5	+0.3
Informal votes		212	1.5	−0.3
Turnout		14,449	92.3	
National hold		Swing	+8.7	

1992 Queensland state election: Gregory
Party	Candidate	Votes	%	±%
National	Vaughan Johnson	8,429	60.2	+9.6
Labor	Colleen Dobson	5,565	39.8	−0.7
Total formal votes		13,994	98.3	
Informal votes		247	1.7	
Turnout		14,241	91.8	
National hold		Swing	+2.8	

=== Elections in the 1980s ===
1989 Queensland state election: Gregory
Party	Candidate	Votes	%	±%
National	Vaughan Johnson	3,441	49.4	−14.1
Labor	Robert Nilon	2,860	41.0	+4.5
Liberal	Dudley Church	366	5.3	+5.3
Independent	Alan Barton	189	2.7	+2.7
Independent	Leo Baird	112	1.6	+1.6
Total formal votes		6,968	96.8	−0.5
Informal votes		227	3.2	+0.5
Turnout		7,195	88.5	+0.1
Two-party-preferred result
National	Vaughan Johnson	3,958	56.8	−6.7
Labor	Robert Nilon	3,010	43.2	+6.7
National hold		Swing	−6.7	

1986 Queensland state election: Gregory
Party	Candidate	Votes	%	±%
National	Bill Glasson	4,370	63.5	+0.9
Labor	Kevin Alexander	2,514	36.5	−0.9
Total formal votes		6,884	97.3	−1.8
Informal votes		188	2.7	+1.8
Turnout		7,072	88.4	−2.3
National hold		Swing	+0.9	

1983 Queensland state election: Gregory
Party	Candidate	Votes	%	±%
National	Bill Glasson	4,690	62.8	+3.6
Labor	Robert McPhee	2,772	37.2	−3.6
Total formal votes		7,462	99.1	+0.3
Informal votes		70	0.9	−0.3
Turnout		7,532	90.7	+3.2
National hold		Swing	+3.6	

1980 Queensland state election: Gregory
Party	Candidate	Votes	%	±%
National	Bill Glasson	4,220	59.2	+2.4
Labor	Gordon Saunders	2,912	40.8	−2.4
Total formal votes		7,132	98.8	−0.1
Informal votes		86	1.2	+0.1
Turnout		7,218	87.5	+0.2
National hold		Swing	+2.4	

=== Elections in the 1970s ===
1977 Queensland state election: Gregory
Party	Candidate	Votes	%	±%
National	Bill Glasson	3,995	56.8	−2.4
Labor	Gordon Saunders	3,044	43.2	+2.4
Total formal votes		7,039	98.7	
Informal votes		90	1.3	
Turnout		7,129	87.3	
National hold		Swing	−2.4	

1974 Queensland state election: Gregory
Party	Candidate	Votes	%	±%
National	Bill Glasson	3,823	62.0	+9.4
Labor	Gordon Harding	2,338	38.0	−9.4
Total formal votes		6,161	99.2	+0.1
Informal votes		47	0.8	−0.1
Turnout		6,208	87.6	+1.4
National hold		Swing	+9.4	

1972 Queensland state election: Gregory
Party	Candidate	Votes	%	±%
Country	Wally Rae	3,019	52.6	−7.8
Labor	Gordon Harding	2,725	47.4	+7.8
Total formal votes		5,744	99.1	
Informal votes		53	0.9	
Turnout		5,797	86.2	
Country hold		Swing	−7.8	

=== Elections in the 1960s ===
1969 Queensland state election: Gregory
Party	Candidate	Votes	%	±%
Country	Wally Rae	3,724	62.7	+3.6
Labor	John Thomas	2,217	37.3	−0.9
Total formal votes		5,941	99.0	−0.1
Informal votes		57	1.0	+0.1
Turnout		5,998	85.4	−0.8
Country hold		Swing	+1.4	

1966 Queensland state election: Gregory
Party	Candidate	Votes	%	±%
Country	Wally Rae	3,844	59.1	+6.9
Labor	Gilbert Burns	2,482	38.2	−4.4
Queensland Labor	David Parker	180	2.8	−2.4
Total formal votes		6,506	99.1	+0.5
Informal votes		59	0.9	−0.5
Turnout		6,565	86.2	−1.4
Two-party-preferred result
Country	Wally Rae	3,991	61.3	+5.3
Labor	Gilbert Burns	2,515	38.7	−5.3
Country hold		Swing	+5.3	

1963 Queensland state election: Gregory
Party	Candidate	Votes	%	±%
Country	Wally Rae	3,545	52.2	−2.2
Labor	Martin Laracy	2,891	42.6	−3.0
Queensland Labor	Bill Hutchinson	353	5.2	+5.2
Total formal votes		6,789	98.6	+0.1
Informal votes		93	1.4	−0.1
Turnout		6,882	87.6	+2.7
Two-party-preferred result
Country	Wally Rae	3,801	56.0	+1.6
Labor	Martin Laracy	2,988	44.0	−1.6
Country hold		Swing	+1.6	

1960 Queensland state election: Gregory
Party	Candidate	Votes	%	±%
Country	Wally Rae	3,695	54.4	
Labor	Martin Laracy	3,098	45.6	
Total formal votes		6,793	98.5	
Informal votes		104	1.5	
Turnout		6,897	84.9	
Country hold		Swing		

=== Elections in the 1950s ===
The election in Gregory was delayed due to the death of incumbent MP George Devries weeks before the election. A supplementary election was held on 5 October, two months after the rest of the state.

1957 Queensland state election: Gregory
Party	Candidate	Votes	%	±%
Country	Wally Rae	2,075	47.6	+12.8
Labor	Jack Duggan	1,328	30.5	−34.8
Queensland Labor	Keith Smith	955	21.9	+21.9
Total formal votes		4,358	99.7	+0.4
Informal votes		12	0.3	−0.4
Turnout		4,370	84.6	−0.7
Country gain from Labor		Swing	+26.3	

1956 Queensland state election: Gregory
Party	Candidate	Votes	%	±%
Labor	George Devries	2,847	65.3	−34.7
Country	Robert Campbell	1,516	34.7	+34.7
Total formal votes		4,363	99.3	
Informal votes		32	0.7	
Turnout		4,395	85.3	
Labor hold		Swing	N/A	

1953 Queensland state election: Gregory
Party	Candidate	Votes	%	±%
Labor	George Devries	unopposed		
Labor hold		Swing		

1950 Queensland state election: Gregory
Party	Candidate	Votes	%	±%
Labor	George Devries	2,594	64.1	
Country	Gordon Lee	1,450	35.9	
Total formal votes		4,044	99.3	
Informal votes		29	0.7	
Turnout		4,073	86.0	
Labor hold		Swing		

=== Elections in the 1940s ===
1947 Queensland state election: Gregory
Party	Candidate	Votes	%	±%
Labor	George Devries	3,335	59.6	−40.4
Country	Gordon Lee	2,264	40.4	+40.4
Total formal votes		5,599	98.9	
Informal votes		60	1.1	
Turnout		5,659	81.6	
Labor hold		Swing	N/A	

1944 Queensland state election: Gregory
Party	Candidate	Votes	%	±%
Labor	George Devries	unopposed		
Labor hold		Swing		

1941 Queensland state election: Gregory
Party	Candidate	Votes	%	±%
Labor	George Devries	2,709	54.2	−10.7
Independent	Charles Brown	2,291	45.8	+45.8
Total formal votes		5,000	97.3	−0.6
Informal votes		136	2.7	+0.6
Turnout		5,136	72.6	−8.8
Labor gain from Independent		Swing	N/A	

=== Elections in the 1930s ===
1938 Queensland state election: Gregory
Party	Candidate	Votes	%	±%
Labor	George Pollock	3,785	64.9	−35.1
Country	Edward Phillott	2,045	35.1	+35.1
Total formal votes		5,830	97.9	
Informal votes		125	2.1	
Turnout		5,955	81.4	
Labor hold		Swing	N/A	

1935 Queensland state election: Gregory
Party	Candidate	Votes	%	±%
Labor	George Pollock	unopposed		
Labor hold		Swing		

1932 Queensland state election: Gregory
Party	Candidate	Votes	%	±%
Labor	George Pollock	unopposed		
Labor hold		Swing		

=== Elections in the 1920s ===
1929 Queensland state election: Gregory
Party	Candidate	Votes	%	±%
Labor	George Pollock	unopposed		
Labor hold		Swing		

1926 Queensland state election: Gregory
Party	Candidate	Votes	%	±%
Labor	George Pollock	unopposed		
Labor hold		Swing		

1923 Queensland state election: Gregory
Party	Candidate	Votes	%	±%
Labor	George Pollock	2,014	66.8	+7.9
United	Fergus McMaster	1,000	33.2	+33.2
Total formal votes		3,014	98.8	+0.2
Informal votes		38	1.2	−0.2
Turnout		3,052	58.8	+0.9
Labor hold		Swing	N/A	

1920 Queensland state election: Gregory
Party	Candidate	Votes	%	±%
Labor	George Pollock	2,504	58.9	−11.6
Northern Country	Robert Nowland	1,748	41.1	+41.1
Total formal votes		4,252	98.6	+1.4
Informal votes		62	1.4	−1.4
Turnout		4,314	57.9	+0.6
Labor hold		Swing	−11.6	

=== Elections in the 1910s ===
1918 Queensland state election: Gregory
Party	Candidate	Votes	%	±%
Labor	Colin Pollock	2,593	70.5	−29.5
National	Eric Anning	1,084	29.5	+29.5
Total formal votes		3,677	97.2	
Informal votes		104	2.8	
Turnout		3,781	57.3	
Labor hold		Swing	N/A	

1915 Queensland state election: Gregory
Party	Candidate	Votes	%	±%
Labor	William Hamilton	unopposed		
Labor hold		Swing		

1912 Queensland state election: Gregory
Party	Candidate	Votes	%	±%
Labor	William Hamilton	1,249	74.4	
Liberal	Francis North	429	25.6	
Total formal votes		1,678	96.4	
Informal votes		63	3.6	
Turnout		1,741	46.6	
Labor hold		Swing		
