= Helen Danesh-Meyer =

New Zealand ophthalmology academic

Dame Helen Danesh-Meyer DNZM FRSNZ
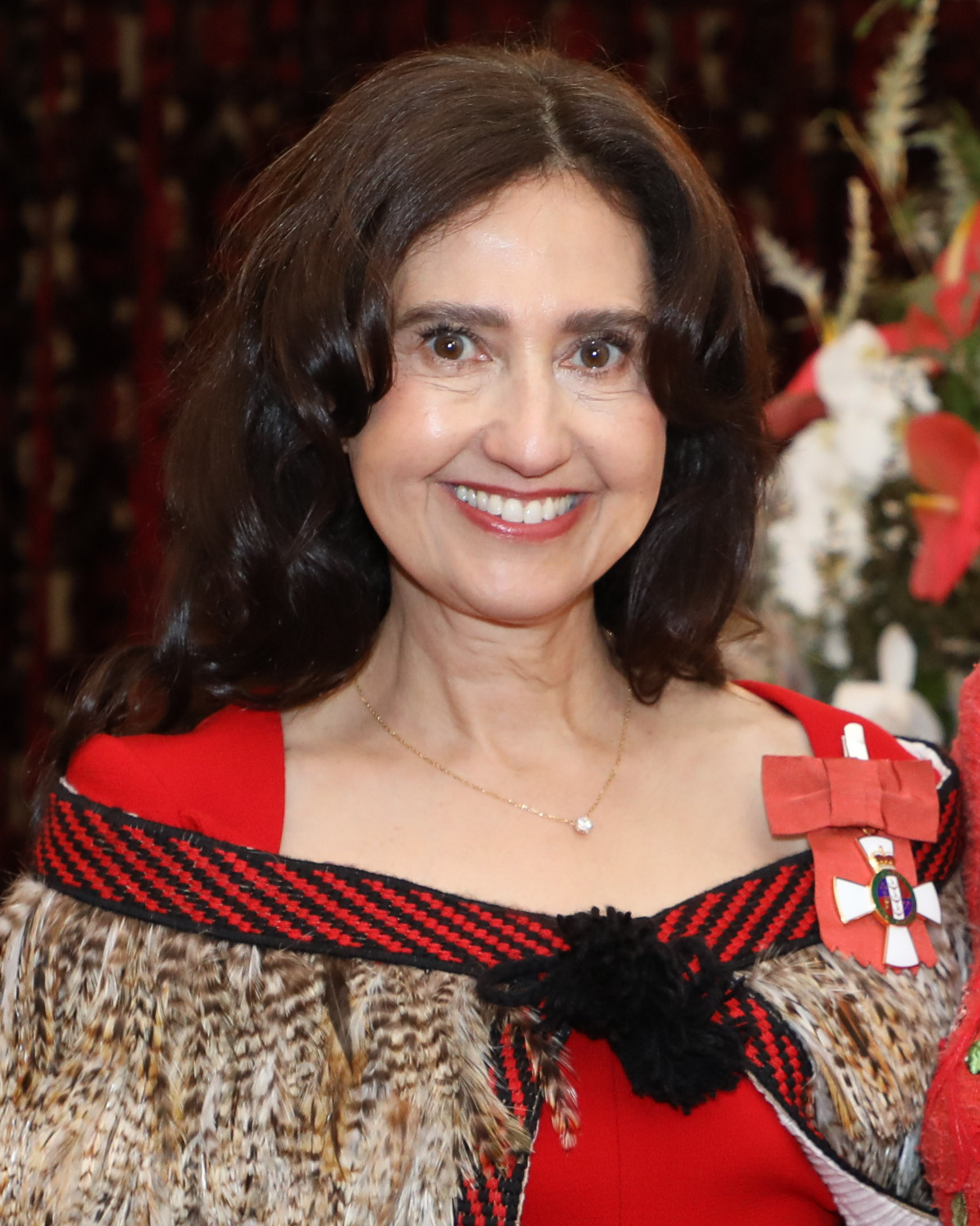
- Danesh-Meyer in 2026
- Born: Helen Victoria Danesh-Meyer; 1967 or 1968 (age 58–59)
- Education: University of Auckland
- Scientific career
- Fields: Ophthalmology
- Workplaces: University of Auckland
- Theses: Evaluation of diagnostic procedures, visual outcome and optic nerve morphology in giant cell arteritis (2004); Evaluation of optic nerve morphology in non-glaucomatous optic neuropathies with quantitative optic nerve imaging modalities (2013)

Dame Helen Victoria Danesh-Meyer DNZM FRSNZ (born 1967 or 1968) is a New Zealand ophthalmology academic, and since 2008 is a full professor at the University of Auckland. She is the first female professor of ophthalmology in New Zealand, and the second female professor in any surgical speciality in New Zealand. In 2025 Danesh-Meyer was elected a Fellow of the Royal Society Te Apārangi.

== Early life ==
Danesh-Meyer was born in 1967 or 1968 to Iranian parents—her mother was a gynaecologist and her father a psychiatrist—and lived in various cities of the United States until the age of 14, when her father was appointed to a position as a psychiatrist at the University of Otago and the family moved to Dunedin. There she was educated at Logan Park High School, before going on to study medicine at the University of Otago, graduating MB ChB in 1991.

== Career ==
After graduating, Danesh-Meyer worked as a house surgeon at Dunedin Hospital, and began to specialise in ophthalmology in 1993. In 1998, she received a fellowship at the Wills Eye Hospital in Philadelphia, where she studied neuro-ophthalmology; in 1999 she received a second fellowship at Wills in which she studied glaucoma.

In 2004, Danesh-Meyer earned a MD degree at the University of Auckland with a thesis titled The evaluation of diagnostic procedures, visual outcome and optic nerve morphology in giant cell arteritis. and in 2013 she completed a PhD with a thesis titled Evaluation of optic nerve morphology in non-glaucomatous optic neuropathies with quantitative optic nerve imaging modalities, also at the University of Auckland.

Danesh-Meyer joined the staff at Auckland in 2001 as an associate professor, and was appointed the Sir William and Lady Stevenson Professor of Ophthalmology in 2008. She is the first female professor of ophthalmology in New Zealand, and the second female professor in any surgical speciality in New Zealand.

Danesh-Meyer is the chair and a founding trustee of Glaucoma NZ, a national charity dedicated to glaucoma awareness and support. She leads advocacy, public education and the strategic direction of the organisation. In 2022, she co-founded Vision Research Foundation and acts as its scientific director and chair. Vision Research Foundation focuses on supporting early- and mid-career vision researchers in New Zealand.

Danesh-Meyer has been an author or co-author of over 200 peer-reviewed publications. Much of her academic profile is due to her work on neuro-ophthalmology, eye-brain interactions and glaucoma. Her work has linked retinal nerve thinning to dementia and inflammation pathways relevant to eye diseases.

== Honours ==
In the 2023 New Year Honours, Danesh-Meyer was appointed a Companion of the New Zealand Order of Merit, for services to ophthalmology. In March 2025, she was elected a Fellow of the Royal Society Te Apārangi "for being an international leader in the field of neuro-ophthalmic disorders". In the 2026 New Year Honours, Danesh-Meyer was promoted to Dame Companion of the New Zealand Order of Merit, for services to ophthalmology.

Danesh-Meyer has received several awards from the Royal Australian and New Zealand College of Ophthalmologists, including the 2022 College Medal and the Dorothy Potter Medal, and she gave the 2022 Dame Ida Mann Lecture.

== Selected works ==
- Danesh-Meyer, H. V.; Birch, H.; Ku, JY-F.; Carroll, Stuart; Gamble, Gregory (2006). "Reduction of optic nerve fibers in patients with Alzheimer disease identified by laser imaging". Neurology. 67 (10): 1852–1854.
- Danesh-Meyer, Helen V.; Papchenko, Taras; Savino, Peter J.; Law, Andrew; Evans, James; Gamble, Greg D. (2008). "In vivo retinal nerve fiber layer thickness measured by optical coherence tomography predicts visual recovery after surgery for parachiasmal tumors". Investigative Ophthalmology & Visual Science. 49 (5): 1879–1885.
- Danesh-Meyer, Helen V. (2008). "Radiation-induced optic neuropathy". Journal of Clinical Neuroscience. 15 (2): 95–100.
- Danesh-Meyer, Helen V. (2011). "Neuroprotection in glaucoma: recent and future directions". Current Opinion in Ophthalmology. 22 (2): 78–86.
- Danesh-Meyer, Helen V.; Savino, Peter J.; Sergott, Robert C. (2001). "Ocular and cerebral ischemia following facial injection of autologous fat". Archives of Ophthalmology. 119 (5): 777–778.
- Danesh-Meyer, Helen V.; Savino, Peter J.; Sergott, Robert C. (2001). "The prevalence of cupping in end-stage arteritic and nonarteritic anterior ischemic optic neuropathy". Ophthalmology. 108 (3): 593–598.
