= Bill Glasson =

Bill Glasson may refer to:

- Bill Glasson (golfer) (born 1960), American golfer
- Bill Glasson (politician) (1925–2012), Australian politician
- Bill Glasson (surgeon) (born 1953), Australian ophthalmologist
