= Dorothy Potter =

New Zealand ophthalmologist

Dorothy Potter CBE
- Born: 27 August 1922; Auckland
- Died: 11 August 2009 (aged 87)
- Resting place: Archer Street Cemetery
- Other name: Dorothy Field Usher Potter
- Known for: first woman president of Ophthalmological Society of New Zealand; founder of the New Zealand Glaucoma Society

Academic background
- Education: University of Otago

Dorothy Field Usher Potter CBE (27 August 1922 – 11 August 2009) was a New Zealand ophthalmic surgeon. She was the second woman ophthalmic surgeon in New Zealand, and the first woman president of the Ophthalmological Society of New Zealand.

== Early life and education ==
Born in Auckland in 1922, Potter's father was Victor Usher, a surgeon. She attended Hilltop School for Girls and Woodford House in Havelock North, before completing her medical intermediate studies at the University of Auckland. She then studied medicine at the University of Otago, graduating in 1948. Potter worked as a house-surgeon in Napier, where she developed her interest in ophthalmology. She studied for her Diploma in Ophthalmology at the Royal Westminster Eye Hospital (now Moorfields) and Central Eye Hospitals in London, where she worked with and came to admire Ida Mann, the first woman professor of ophthalmology in the UK. Potter was the second woman ophthalmic surgeon in New Zealand, after Caroline Stenhouse.

== Career ==
Potter returned to New Zealand in 1953, after the accidental death of her father. She applied for a position at Auckland Hospital, but despite being short staffed they declined to employ a woman. She worked instead as a locum at Hamilton Hospital. She married farmer Charles Potter, on the condition that she did no housework, and kept the name Usher. Settling in Masterton, she found "the people of Masterton could not handle" her using her maiden name, and so from 1965 she was known by her married name. She worked in both Masterton and Wellington as a non-surgical ophthalmologist. An interest in glaucoma led Potter to conduct a research project with Ida Mann on glaucoma rates in Māori in the King Country, Bay of Plenty, East Cape, and Wairarapa, in comparison to African American and New Zealand Europeans. Potter established the New Zealand Glaucoma Society and a trust fund to promote glaucoma research. Potter worked as an examiner for the Civil Aviation Department and co-founded the New Zealand branch of the Australia and New Zealand Medical Aviation Society. Potter assisted in the re-creation of the Wellington branch of the Medical Women's Association in 1971.

Potter was among the first New Zealand ophthalmologist to fit contact lenses, and this led her to an interest in ocular allergies, which she published on.

Potter was elected President of the Ophthalmological Society of New Zealand (now part of the Royal Australian and New Zealand College of Ophthalmologists) in 1984, and was the first and only woman to hold the role between its establishment in 1946 and its merger in 1998. During her presidency, Potter organised the 1985 annual conference in Masterton, and arranged an official coat of arms for the society.

== Recognition ==
She was a Fellows of the Royal Australian and New Zealand College of Ophthalmologists (RANZCO), and of the Royal College of Ophthalmologists. Potter was made an honorary life member of the Medical Women's Association in 1991. In 1993 she was awarded a CBE in the New Year Honour List, for services to ophthalmology.

In 2019 RANZCO established the Dorothy Potter Medal lecture in Potter's honour.

== Personal life ==
Potter's husband died in 2008. Potter died in 2009, and was survived by her son.

== Selected works ==
Potter published on ocular allergies, and edited an edition of Ida Mann's autobiography:

- Mann, Ida (1998). Elizabeth Imlay Buckley; Usher, Dorothy (eds.). Ida and the eye : a woman in British ophthalmology. Speldhurst. ISBN 1-898594-63-5. Wikidata Q135693132.
- Potter, Dorothy F.; Duncan, R. Bruce (May 1976). "Ocular Allergy in Association with Diet". Australian Journal of Ophthalmology. 4 (2): 112–115.
