= Edgar Hartley Kettle =

British pathologist (1882-1936)

Edgar Hartley Kettle FRS (20 April 1882, London – 1 December 1936) was a British pathologist.

After education at Skipton Grammar School, Kettle studied medicine at St Mary's Hospital and graduated there M.B., B.Chir. (Lond.) in 1907. From 1907 to 1911 he was a demonstrator in pathology at the Cancer Hospital, Fulham. In 1910 he received the higher medical qualification M.D. (Lond.). He spent a year in 1911–1912 working under Ludwig Aschoff in Freiburg. In 1912 Kettle returned to St Mary's and became an assistant to Bernard Spilsbury. In 1926 Kettle qualified as M.R.C.P. After holding various posts, he took in 1927 the chair of pathology at the Cardiff University School of Medicine and remained there until 1934. From 1934 until his death in 1936 he was the director of the Royal Postgraduate Medical School at Hammersmith. Kettle gained an international reputation by his studies on silicosis, tuberculosis, and gas gangrene.

In 1918 Kettle married Dr Marguerite Henrietta Pam (1887–1939), who was an assistant editor of The Lancet. They had no children.

== Awards and honours ==
- 1931 — Fellow of the Royal College of Physicians
- 1936 — F.R.S.

== Selected publications ==
- Kettle EH (1918). "Tumours arising from endothelium". Proceedings of the Royal Society of Medicine. 11(Pathol Sect): 19–34. PMC 2066263. PMID 19980260.
- with William E. Gye: "Silicosis and miners' phthisis". British Journal of Experimental Pathology. 3 (5): 241–251. 1922. PMC 2047740.
- "The demonstration by the fixation abscess of the influence of silica in determining B. tuberculosis infections". British Journal of Experimental Pathology. 5 (3): 158–164. 1924. PMC 2047896.
- "The relation of dust to infection". Journal of the Royal Society of Medicine. 24 (1): 79–94. 1930.
- "The interstitial reactions caused by various dusts and their influence on tuberculous infections". The Journal of Pathology and Bacteriology. 35 (3): 395–405. 1932. doi:10.1002/path.1700350310.
