= 2014 Griffith by-election =

- 8 February 2014

Griffith (Qld) in the House of Representatives
- Turnout: 82.03% ▼11.11
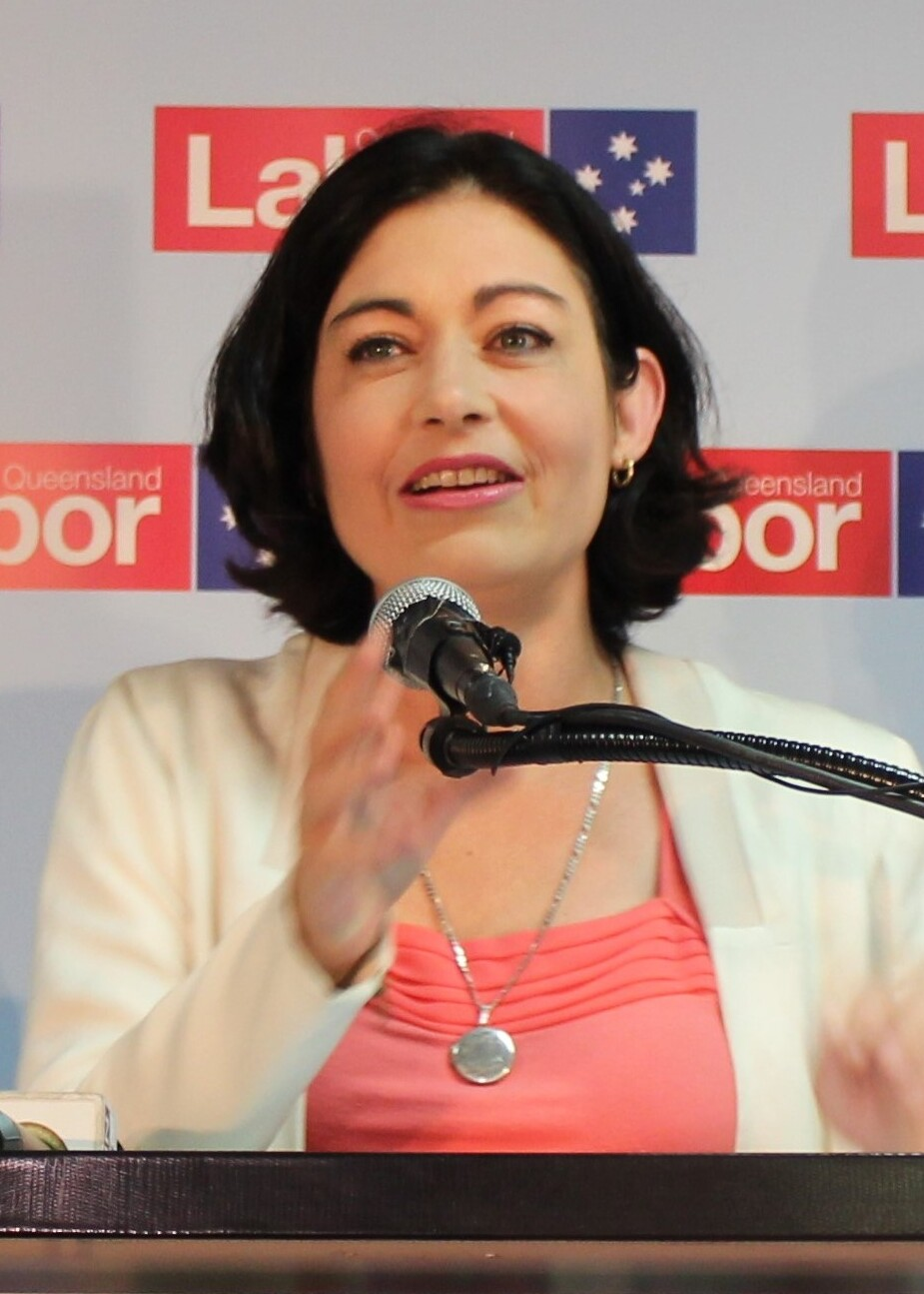

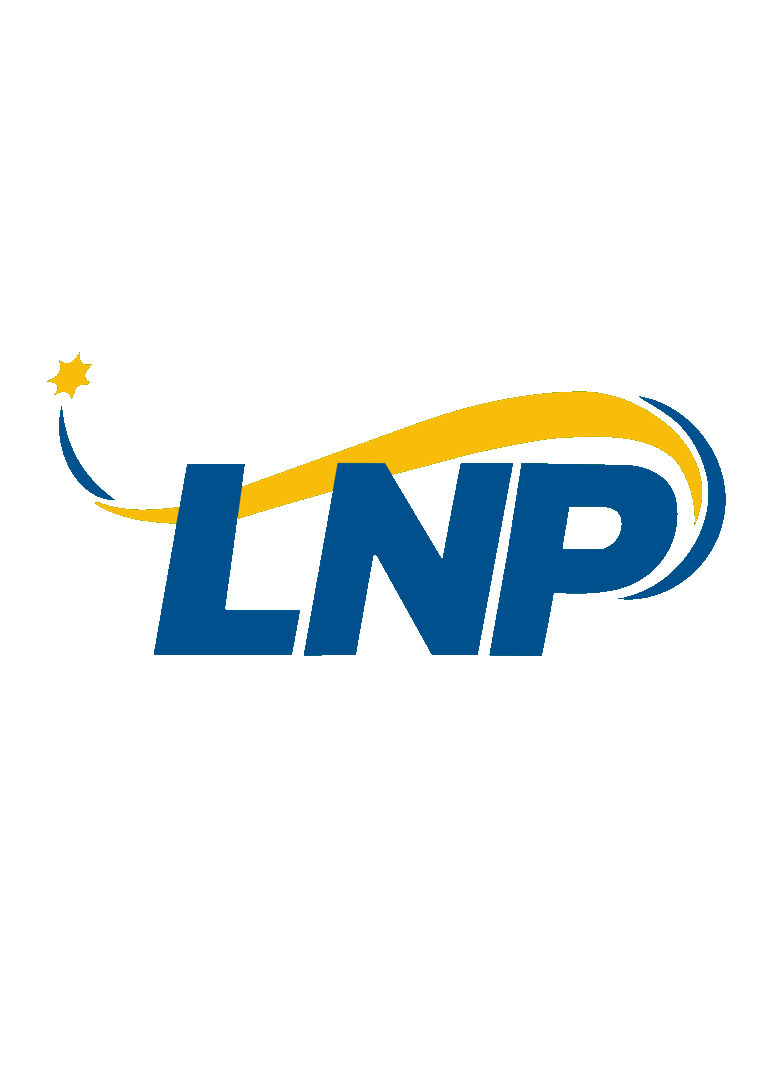

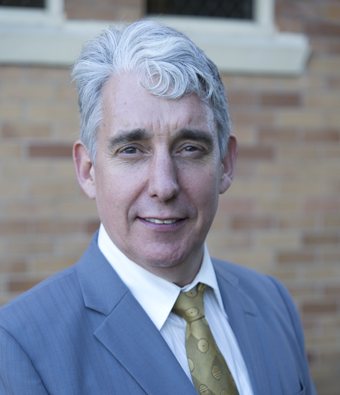
	First party	Second party	Third party
Candidate	Terri Butler	Bill Glasson	Geoff Ebbs
Party	Labor	Liberal National	Greens
Popular vote	30,023	34,491	7,635
Percentage	38.63%	44.38%	9.82%
Swing	▼1.73	▲2.16	▼0.36
TPP	51.76%	48.24%
TPP swing	▼1.25	▲1.25
MP before election
Kevin Rudd
Labor
Elected MP
Terri Butler
Labor

A by-election for the Australian House of Representatives seat of Griffith was held on 8 February 2014. Terri Butler retained the seat for Labor with a 51.8% two-party-preferred vote against Liberal National Party candidate Bill Glasson.

== Background ==
Former Prime Minister Kevin Rudd announced on 13 November 2013 that he would step down from the parliament after his party's defeat at the 2013 election.

The division of Griffith is located in the inner suburbs of Queensland's capital city, Brisbane. Since the seat's creation in 1934, Griffith has changed parties eight times. Labor's Kevin Rudd had held the seat since regaining it for Labor in 1998, having previously unsuccessfully contested the seat in 1996. Rudd retained Griffith at the 2013 election with 53 percent of the two-party-preferred vote from primary votes of Liberal 42.2 percent, Labor 40.4 percent, Greens 10.2 percent, Palmer 3.4 percent, with the remaining seven candidates on a collective 3.8 percent. Rudd's support was highest in Griffith at the 2007 election with 62.3 percent of the two-party vote when he led Labor to government. At the 2010 election he retained his seat with 58.5 percent of the two-party vote.

The tender of the resignation to the Speaker took place on 22 November 2013. The writ for the election was issued on 6 January 2014. Electoral rolls closed 8pm 13 January 2014, candidate nominations closed midday 16 January 2014, with declaration of candidate nominations and ballot order draw occurring midday 17 January 2014. The by-election occurred between 8am and 6pm on 8 February 2014.

It was the first by-election for the House of Representatives since the Bradfield and Higgins by-elections in December 2009, the second longest interval between by-elections.

== Candidates ==
The 11 candidate nominations in ballot paper order were:

Party	Candidate	Background
Australian Stable Population Party	Timothy Lawrence	Software developer.
Australian Greens	Geoff Ebbs	Publisher of the Westender newspaper. Contested the seat at the 2013 election.
Family First Party	Christopher Williams	Electrician, worship music band member. Campaigned strongly against same-sex marriage.
Independent	Karel Boele	Ran as an electronic direct democracy 'PeopleDecide' independent.
Bullet Train for Australia	Anthony Ackroyd	Sydney-based comedian.
Secular Party of Australia	Anne Reid	Accountant, secretary of the Humanist Society of Queensland. Contested the seat at the 2013 election.
Australian Labor Party	Terri Butler	Employment and IR law partner at Maurice Blackburn.
Pirate Party Australia	Melanie Thomas	Activist, active in Australian media industry. Contested Senate in Queensland at the 2013 election.
Independent	Travis Windsor	Small business mentor. Inspired by successful 2013 Cathy McGowan campaign in Indi.
Katter's Australian Party	Ray Sawyer	Worked for local government for 15 years. Contested Fairfax at the 2013 election.
Liberal National Party of Queensland	Bill Glasson	Ophthalmologist and former President of the Australian Medical Association. Contested the seat at the 2013 election.

The Palmer United Party, Rise Up Australia Party and Socialist Alliance did not re-contest Griffith at the by-election.

== Betting/polling ==
Upon the 6 January announcement of the by-election date, odds from Sportingbet favoured Labor at $1.18 against $4.25 for the LNP.

Queensland federal statewide Newspoll conducted from October to December 2013 indicated a three percent two-party swing from the LNP to Labor since the 2013 election, while Nielsen conducted in November 2013 indicated a 12 percent two-party swing from the LNP to Labor.

Only two times in history has a government won a seat from the opposition in a by-election; the first being the 1920 Kalgoorlie by-election, and the second instance not occurring until 103 years later with the 2023 Aston by-election. Political analysts predicted that Labor would retain Griffith.

== Two-party-preferred history ==
Election:	1975	1977	1980	1983	1984	1987	1990	1993	1996	1998	2001	2004	2007	2010	2013
Labor	42.0%	53.5%	62.9%	64.5%	60.3%	60.4%	60.3%	58.0%	48.5%	52.4%	55.7%	58.6%	62.3%	58.5%	53.0%
Liberal	58.0%	46.5%	37.1%	35.5%	39.7%	39.6%	39.7%	42.0%	51.5%	47.6%	44.3%	41.4%	37.7%	41.5%	47.0%

== Results ==
2014 Griffith by-election
Party	Candidate	Votes	%	±%
Liberal National	Bill Glasson	34,491	44.38	+2.16
Labor	Terri Butler	30,023	38.63	−1.73
Greens	Geoff Ebbs	7,635	9.82	−0.36
Pirate	Melanie Thomas	1,172	1.51	+1.51
Katter's Australian	Ray Sawyer	821	1.06	+0.37
Family First	Christopher Williams	729	0.94	+0.20
Stable Population	Timothy Lawrence	666	0.86	+0.67
Independent	Travis Windsor	656	0.84	+0.84
Bullet Train	Anthony Ackroyd	602	0.77	+0.77
Independent	Karel Boele	504	0.65	+0.65
Secular	Anne Reid	424	0.55	+0.04
Total formal votes		77,723	96.82	+1.58
Informal votes		2,552	3.18	−1.58
Turnout		80,275	82.03	−11.11
Two-party-preferred result
Labor	Terri Butler	40,229	51.76	−1.25
Liberal National	Bill Glasson	37,494	48.24	+1.25
Labor hold		Swing	−1.25	

== See also ==
- List of Australian federal by-elections
- 2014 Redcliffe state by-election
