= William Ewart Gye =

British pathologist and cancer researcher

William Ewart Gye FRS (born William Ewart Bullock; 11 August 1889, Breaston – 14 October 1952) was a British pathologist and cancer researcher.

== Career ==
After a difficult financial struggle, Bullock matriculated at University College, Nottingham and, after studying chemistry under Kipping, graduated there with a BSc in 1906.

In 1911, Bullock married his first wife, Elsa Gye, who was a dedicated suffragette. Bullock studied medicine at the University of Edinburgh and in 1912 graduated there MBChB. In 1913 he received his Doctor of Medicine qualification from the university, and won a gold medal for his medical thesis. He also won the Ellis Prize in Physiology for his essay, “The chemistry of nerve degeneration.”

In 1913, he joined the staff of the Imperial Cancer Research Fund, which at that time was under the direction of Ernest Francis Bashford. When World War I started, Bullock joined the Royal Army Medical Corps and served in France and then Italy in charge of a field ambulance unit. He was reassigned to London as a hospital pathologist and worked with William Cramer on gas gangrene.

After demobilization with the rank of captain, he joined the National Institute for Medical Research at Hampstead, where he worked with Edgar Hartley Kettle on silicosis. In June 1919, William Bullock's wife retook her maiden name, and William Ewart Bullock changed his surname to "Gye", perhaps because he wanted to please his wife and perhaps because he was irritated by having to often explain that he was not the bacteriologist William Bulloch — there is a theory that the name change was in gratitude to a benefactor (not Bullock's wife or father-in-law).

With W. J. Purdy, Gye conducted experiments confirming Peyton Rous's claims concerning the Rous sarcoma virus. Gye was the director of the Imperial Cancer Research Fund's laboratories at Mill Hill from 1934 to 1949, when he resigned due to ill health. He was elected a Fellow of the Royal Society in 1938 and a Fellow of the Royal College of Physicians in 1940.

Gye's and his first wife, Elsa, had three sons together. She died of cancer in 1943. On 30 December 1944, Gye married ophthalmologist Ida Mann (later Dame Ida Mann) and, in 1949, they moved to Perth, Western Australia.
