= Caroline Stenhouse =

First woman ophthalmic surgeon in New Zealand

- Born: 14 January 1900
- Died: 16 March 1988 (aged 88)
- Education: Otago Medical School

Caroline Morrow Stenhouse (14 January 1900 – 16 March 1988) was a New Zealand surgeon, and was the first woman ophthalmological surgeon in the country. After gaining her medical degree, she chose to specialise in ophthalmology due to being diagnosed with progressive deafness. Stenhouse worked for most of her career at Christchurch Hospital, and was a founding member of the Opthalmological Society of New Zealand (now part of the Royal Australian and New Zealand College of Ophthalmologists), of which she was elected an honorary life member in 1974.

== Early life and education ==
Stenhouse was born in rural Otago, near Balclutha. She was the eldest child of Scottish parents, Andrew Stenhouse and Margaret Simpson nee McLeod. Her mother was a nurse, and had worked as a theatre nurse for ophthalmologist Lindo Ferguson, and her father was a doctor. Stenhouse's mother insisted that all three daughters were educated to a profession, with Caroline's sisters becoming a teacher and a dentist. Stenhouse attended school in Balclutha, and then completed a medical degree at Otago Medical School, graduating in 1924. Like other women medical students at the time, she reported that her school education in mathematics and sciences had been inadequate preparation for medical school.

== Surgical career ==
In 1924 Stenhouse was appointed to Southland hospital, where she worked as a house surgeon, replacing Rita Gillies, who was moving into private practice. After a year in Invercargill, Stenhouse travelled to London where she trained in ophthalmology at Moorfields Hospital (now Moorfields Eye Hospital). Ida Mann, the first woman to become a professor of ophthalmology in Britain, gained an honorary position at Moorfields the following year. Stenhouse had decided to specialise in ophthalmology due to her increasing deafness, caused by the progressive condition otosclerosis, which made using a stethoscope difficult. Stenhouse earned a Diploma in Ophthalmic Medicine and Surgery, awarded jointly by the Royal College of Surgeons, in London in 1927. She then undertook work in a variety of hospitals in India, although she found the work to be different to her expectations, as the sorts of cases encountered were not similar to those in New Zealand.

After several years in India, Stenhouse returned to New Zealand in 1930, where she joined a private practice in Christchurch. She was the first woman ophthalmic surgeon in New Zealand. In 1932, Stenhouse was appointed as an honorary eye specialist at Christchurch Hospital, a position she retained for the rest of her career (all hospital appointments at this time were honorary rather than salaried). Stenhouse lectured in ophthalmology at the hospital, speaking at the nursing students' graduation in 1952. From 1939 to 1945, she was consulting ophthalmologist to the NZ Army.

In 1948 Stenhouse spent ten months in the UK, returning in January of 1949, after studying the latest eye treatments used at hospitals in Glasgow and around Britain. In 1964 Stenhouse was appointed as ophthalmology lecturer to students of the Christchurch School of Nursing.

As the first woman ophthalmologist in New Zealand, Stenhouse faced barriers. The Ophthalmological Society of New Zealand (OSNZ), of which she was a founding member in 1946, didn't know what to do with her during the annual conference dinner, which was hosted at a gentleman's club. They settled on giving the women (Stenhouse and the gentlemen member's wives) a sherry party at another venue.

A similar situation arose in 1951 when the New Zealand branch of the British Medical Association held its biennial conference. Forty-four women doctors were excluded from the conference dinner, but were hosted by Stenhouse instead, who, as reported in the press, "wore a handsome dress of black velvet lightened with diamente embroidery".

In 1974 Stenhouse was elected an honorary life member of the OSNZ. Stenhouse was also an honorary medical officer of the Youth Centre in Christchurch.

== Personal life ==
Stenhouse retired in 1960, passing her private practice to Rod Suckling. In her retirement she learnt Japanese, studied theology and took up Scottish dancing. She died in Christchurch on 16 March 1988, at the age of 88 years.
