= Sean Dillon (politician) =

Australian politician

Sean Dillon MP

Member of the Legislative Assembly of Queensland for Gregory
- Incumbent
- Assumed office 26 October 2024
- Preceded by: Lachlan Millar

Mayor of Barcaldine Region
- In office 28 March 2020 – 16 March 2024
- Preceded by: Rob Chandler
- Succeeded by: Rob Chandler

Councillor of the Barcaldine Regional Council
- In office 19 March 2016 – 16 March 2024

Personal details
- Party: Liberal National
- Profession: Politician

Sean Dillon is an Australian politician who serves as the member for Gregory in the Legislative Assembly of Queensland. Prior to entering the state parliament, he was the mayor of the Barcaldine Regional Council in central western Queensland.

== Political career ==
In 2016, Dillon was elected to the Barcaldine Regional Council as a councillor.

In 2020, Dillon defeated long-time incumbent mayor Rob Chandler for the mayoralty of Barcaldine Regional Council in a close election. Upon his victory, Dillon cited his platform of "increased consultation" and "a new approach to water rates" as reasons for his victory. As mayor, he announced plans for a high-voltage transmission line to connect Barcaldine to the national power grid, as part of the Barcaldine Renewable Energy Zone proposal.

After criticising the feasibility of the COVID-19 vaccine rollout in Barcaldine based on the information provided to him in a council meeting, the Office of the Independent Assessor (OIA), an independent statutory body which investigates conduct complaints about Queensland local government councillors, announced an investigation into him. In response Dillon strongly criticised the OIA, labelling the investigation against him "farcical," and called for a parliamentary inquiry into its powers. These sentiments were echoed by Campbell Newman and Jack Dempsey. In February 2022, the complaint was dismissed by the OIA. The OIA blamed the investigation on Dillon having received "incorrect information" from council staff, which Dillon rejected as the OIA having "scapegoated" council employees "for the OIA's administrative incompetence and legal deficiency." In 2023, the Palaszczuk government reduced the scope of the OIA.

In December 2023, it was reported in Queensland Country Life that Dillon was retiring at the next Barcaldine Regional Council election in order to seek selection as a Liberal National Party candidate in the Legislative Assembly seat of Gregory, where incumbent Lachlan Millar was retiring. Dillon defeated Nicole Heslin, Millar's Longreach electorate office manager; Nicole Bond, an ABC Radio employee in Longreach; and Joe Burns, a councillor of the Central Highlands Regional Council for the preselection.

== Personal life ==
Dillon enjoys campdrafting, and was as of 2023 a vice-president of the Australian Campdrafting Association.
