= George Devries =

Australian politician

The Honourable George Devries
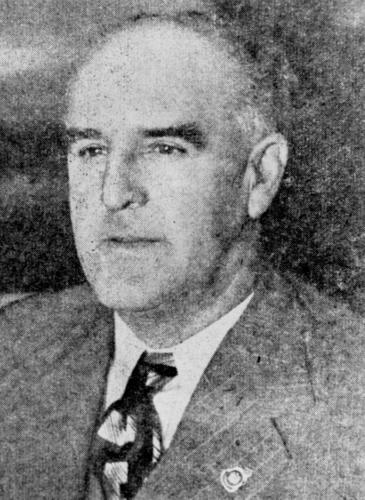

Member of the Queensland Legislative Assembly for Gregory
- In office 29 Mar 1941 – 13 Jul 1957
- Preceded by: Charles Brown
- Succeeded by: Wally Rae

Personal details
- Born: George Henry Devries; 4 July 1896 Stretford, England
- Died: 13 July 1957 (aged 61) Winton, Queensland, Australia
- Party: Queensland Labor Party
- Other political affiliations: Labor
- Spouse: Bridget Ellen Hillery (m.1920)
- Occupation: Bush worker

George Henry Devries (4 July 1896 – 13 July 1957) was a member of the Queensland Legislative Assembly.

== Biography ==
Devries was born at Stretford, England, the son of John Arms Devries and his wife Elizabeth (née Ware). He was apprenticed as a midshipman in 1911 and spent four years at sea before joining his parents at Bushley, near Rockhampton. In 1916 he joined the First Australian Imperial Force, serving with the 15th Battalion in France and Belgium. In July 1917 he suffered a self-administered gunshot wound to the knee. He was discharged with the rank of Lance Corporal in 1919. Once back in civilian life he held several jobs as a bushworker in the Longreach area before starting work with the Australian Workers' Union in 1925, first as a clerk and eventually as the Secretary of the Western District from 1929 until 1941.

On 16 December 1920 he married Bridget Ellen Hillery and together had two sons and two daughters. Devries died of a heart attack in Winton while campaigning for the 1957 Queensland state election.

== Public career ==
Devries, a member of the Labor Party, won the seat of Gregory at the 1941 Queensland state election. He defeated the sitting member Charles Brown. He went on to represent the electorate for the next 16 years before dying in office in 1957.

When the Premier, Vince Gair, was expelled from the Labor Party in 1957, he, and most of his ministry (including Devries) formed the Queensland Labor Party. During his political career, Devries held three ministerial portfolios:

- Attorney-General 1949–1950
- Secretary for Public Instruction 1950–1956
- Secretary for Mines 1956–1957

Devries was a champion boxer and had a reputation for his charity and philanthropy, especially during the depression years.

Parliament of Queensland
Preceded by Charles Brown	Member for Gregory; 1941–1957	Succeeded by Wally Rae
