= Electoral district of Gregory =

State electoral district of Queensland, Australia

Gregory Queensland—Legislative Assembly
- Map of the electoral district of Gregory, 2017
- State: Queensland
- Created: 1878
- MP: Sean Dillon
- Party: Liberal National
- Namesake: Augustus Charles Gregory
- Electors: 24,785 (2020)
- Area: 459,681 km^{2} (177,483.8 sq mi)
- Demographic: Rural and remote
- Coordinates: 24°39′S 145°22′E
Electorates around Gregory:
Northern Territory	Traeger	Burdekin
Northern Territory	Gregory	Mirani
South Australia	Warrego	Callide

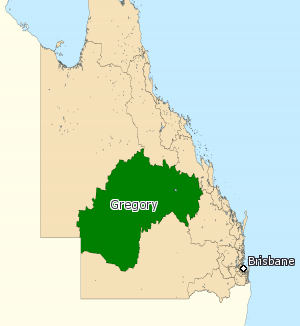
2008 map of Gregory

Gregory is a Legislative Assembly of Queensland electoral district in Queensland, Australia.

== Members for Gregory ==
Member	Party	Term
Charles Lumley Hill		1878–1882
Thomas McWhannell		1882–1888
William Henry Corfield	Ministerial	1888–1899
William Hamilton	Labor	1899–1915
George Pollock	Labor	1915–1939
Charles Brown	Independent	1939–1941
George Devries	Labor	1941–1957
George Devries	Queensland Labor	1957
Wally Rae	Country	1957–1974
Bill Glasson	National	1974–1989
Vaughan Johnson	National	1989–2008
Vaughan Johnson	Liberal National	2008–2015
Lachlan Millar	Liberal National	2015–2024
Sean Dillon	Liberal National	2024–present

== Election results ==
2024 Queensland state election: Gregory
Party	Candidate	Votes	%	±%
Liberal National	Sean Dillon	12,249	57.38	+3.18
Labor	Rebecca Humphreys	4,486	21.01	−3.79
One Nation	Michael Ellison	2,977	13.94	+0.14
Family First	John Campbell	993	4.65	+4.65
Greens	Ell-Leigh Ackerman	644	3.02	+0.22
Total formal votes		21,349	96.85	−0.43
Informal votes		694	3.15	+0.43
Turnout		22,043	83.90	−1.84
Two-party-preferred result
Liberal National	Sean Dillon	15,167	71.04	+3.84
Labor	Rebecca Humphreys	6,182	28.96	−3.84
Liberal National hold		Swing	+3.84	

== See also ==
- Politics of Australia
