= George Pollock (Australian politician) =

Australian politician

The Honourable George Pollock
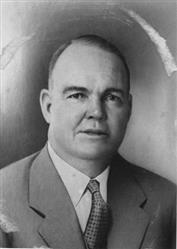

18th Speaker of the Queensland Legislative Assembly
- In office 15 August 1932 – 24 March 1939
- Preceded by: Charles Taylor
- Succeeded by: Ted Hanson

Member of the Queensland Legislative Assembly for Gregory
- In office 18 August 1915 – 24 March 1939
- Preceded by: William Hamilton
- Succeeded by: Charles Brown

Personal details
- Born: George Pollock; 27 June 1890 Charters Towers, Queensland, Australia
- Died: 24 March 1939 (aged 48) Brisbane, Queensland, Australia
- Party: Labor
- Spouse: Margaret Adeline Shepherd (m.1909)
- Occupation: Bush worker

George Pollock (27 June 1890 – 24 March 1939) was a member of the Queensland Legislative Assembly. He was the Speaker of the Queensland Legislative Assembly from 1932 until 1939 and died by a self-administered gunshot wound in Parliament House in 1939.

== Biography ==
Pollock was born at Charters Towers, Queensland, the son of Matthew Pollock and his wife Naomi (née Gauvin). He was educated at Richmond Hill State School in Charters Towers and for most of his working life he engaged in bush work in Western and Northern Queensland.

On 27 December 1909 he married Margaret Adeline Shepherd and together had two sons and a daughter. Pollock died at Parliament House, Brisbane in March 1939.

== Public career ==
Pollock, a member of the Labor, was unopposed for the seat of Gregory at the 1915 by-election caused by the resignation of the sitting member, William Hamilton. He had a long career representing the electorate and it ended with his death in 1939. He was the Chairman of Committees from 1924 to 1929 and Speaker of the Queensland Legislative Assembly from 1932 until 1939.

During his time in parliament he built up an extensive knowledge of standing orders which he used to great advantage against the Moore Government between 1929 and 1932. On becoming Speaker he served the position with dignity and distinction and he strictly interpreted the standing orders and kept close control over the House. He even once rebuked his leader, Premier Forgan Smith, for reading his speech on a bill, something that is not permitted in parliament.

== Death ==
For the last several years of his life Pollock was in poor health and for his last two years he was in need of a walking stick. On 24 March 1939, he could take no more and shot himself with a shotgun he used for pigeon shooting. A note was found and it read:

A complete nervous and mental breakdown. Cannot carry on. Too much pain. He signed his name to it and underneath was a postscript which read: My poor, tortured brain. Goodbye to my loved ones.

His body was found when the manageress of the parliamentary refreshment room, (Miss Curnow) went to inquire what Pollock would like for lunch. She went back to the refreshment rooms and told the Premier what had happened. He went to Pollock's room and found him, apparently dead, and ordered that the doctor and police be immediately summoned. Upon leaving the room, Forgan Smith forgot to leave it unlocked and the police had to gain entrance by walking along a narrow parapet on the first floor and climbing through the window.

Besides some of his parliamentary colleagues, his funeral, which was held the next day, was a private affair. It proceeded from the funeral parlour of K.M. Smith in South Brisbane to the Mt Thompson Crematorium.

Parliament of Queensland
Preceded by William Hamilton	Member for Gregory; 1915–1939	Succeeded by Charles Brown
