= Charles Brown (Australian politician) =

Australian politician

Dr Charles Brown

Member of the Queensland Legislative Assembly for Gregory
- In office 27 May 1939 – 29 March 1941
- Preceded by: George Pollock
- Succeeded by: George Devries

Personal details
- Born: Charles Victor Watson Brown; 24 May 1895 Paddington, New South Wales, Australia
- Died: 1 May 1970 (aged 74) Eagle Junction, Queensland, Australia
- Party: Independent
- Other political affiliations: Country-National (1943); Services Party (c. 1945-1946)
- Spouse: Beryl Askew Rusden (m.1920)
- Education: University of Sydney
- Occupation: Doctor

Dr Charles Victor Watson Brown (24 May 1895 – 1 May 1970) was an Australian politician. He was the Independent member for Gregory in the Legislative Assembly of Queensland from 1939 to 1941.

Brown was born in Paddington in Sydney and was educated at Fort Street Public School. He became a teacher before enrolling in a medical degree at the University of Sydney. He served for two years with the Royal Australian Army Medical Corps in World War I before completing his degree in 1920. He worked at the Mater Misericordiae Hospital and Royal Alexandra Hospital for Children and practised in Balmain in Sydney before moving to Isisford in Queensland as medical officer at the Isisford District Hospital. He later spent 17 years as a doctor at Longreach, including a stint as government medical officer, in which role he served until his election to parliament. He was known across the district for his early adoption of aeroplanes for use in medical care and his efforts to address children's welfare and trachoma.

He was elected to the Legislative Assembly at a 1939 by-election following the death of Labor MP George Pollock. Upon his election, he insisted that he would remain independent in addressing issues and touted key concerns as being the improvement of health services, housing and perishable food storage in western Queensland and the establishment of a local Australian Broadcasting Commission radio station. In February 1941, while a serving MP, he enlisted in the Royal Australian Air Force to serve in World War II. However, two months later, he lost his seat to Labor candidate George Devries at the 1941 Queensland state election.

Brown was the unsuccessful lead Senate candidate for the Country-National Organisation (affiliated with the federal United Australia Party) at the 1943 Australian federal election. He later served as the honorary secretary of the Services Party of Australia in the mid-1940s.

Parliament of Queensland
Preceded by George Pollock	Member for Gregory; 1939–1941	Succeeded by George Devries
