= Bill Glasson (surgeon) =

Australian ophthalmologist (born 1953)

William John Glasson AO (born 2 January 1953) is an Australian ophthalmologist. He was President of the Australian Medical Association 2003–05. He was an unsuccessful candidate for the Liberal National Party of Queensland in the contest for the seat of Griffith, held by the Prime Minister Kevin Rudd, in the 2013 federal election. He was again unsuccessful in the by-election held on 8 February 2014 as a result of Rudd's resignation from Parliament.

== Career ==
Glasson was born in Winton, Queensland on 2 January 1953. His father, also Bill Glasson (1925–2012), was a National Party Queensland state politician 1974–89, and a Cabinet minister in the Government of Joh Bjelke-Petersen, holding the portfolios of Police and Lands, among others.

He was a student at Anglican Church Grammar School (Churchie) in East Brisbane from 1965 to 1969.

He commenced his career as an optometrist, before studying to become an ophthalmologist. He studied at the University of Queensland, gaining a Bachelor of Medicine and Bachelor of Surgery (MBBS). He has a medical and surgical practice in suburban Brisbane. His practice extends to western Queensland and to East Timor, where he oversees the St John Eye Services and education in Oecuzzi.

He is a member of the Australian Army Reserve. He is also a consultant ophthalmologist to the Australian Army with the rank of lieutenant colonel. He was also medical adviser to the Northern Territory Emergency Response Taskforce 2006–07.

He has been President of the Royal Australian and New Zealand College of Ophthalmologists. He is a member of professional organisations such as the Royal Australasian College of Surgeons, American Academy of Ophthalmology, Australian Society of Cataract & Refractive Surgery, American Society of Cataract & Refractive Surgery and Australian Optometry Association. He is an Adjunct Associate Professor with the University of Queensland School of Medicine.

== Australian Medical Association ==
Glasson became involved in the Australian Medical Association (AMA) at the Queensland level in 1995, rising to become State President 2001–02. In 2003 he was elected to succeed Kerryn Phelps as National President of the AMA. He remained in this post until 2005.

== Politics ==
In September 2012 he was chosen as the Liberal National Party of Queensland's candidate for the Brisbane federal seat of Griffith to oppose the Labor sitting member, Kevin Rudd. At that time, Rudd was the former Prime Minister of Australia, as he had resigned the office in June 2010 and Julia Gillard had been elected unopposed in his place. In June 2013, however, Rudd regained the prime ministership. Glasson was unsuccessful at the September 2013 federal election, with Rudd retaining Griffith with 53.0% of the two-party preferred vote, representing a 5.5% swing against the ALP. This swing was the largest suffered by a Labor incumbent in Queensland at the election. Glasson led Rudd on primary votes by 42.2% to 40.4%. In his concession speech after losing the prime ministership to Tony Abbott, Kevin Rudd said "it would be un-prime ministerial of me to say Bill Glasson, eat your heart out, so I won't".

Rudd resigned from Parliament in November 2013, and a Griffith by-election was held on 8 February 2014. Glasson again contested for the LNP, but was defeated by Labor's Terri Butler.

In May 2015 Glasson unsuccessfully sought preselection for the casual vacancy in the representation of Queensland in the Senate caused by resignation of Senator Brett Mason. One of nine candidates, he was defeated by Joanna Lindgren on the final count. The Sydney Morning Herald reported that Lindgren was a "surprise candidate" who "opposes gay marriage, abortion and euthanasia" after Glasson was "called in" to explain his support for gay rights.

== Family ==
Glasson's wife Claire Jackson is a general practitioner and former president of the Royal Australian College of General Practitioners. Glasson himself is an Honorary Fellow of the college. They have three children, two daughters and a son.

== Honours ==
In the Australia Day Honours 2008 he was appointed an Officer of the Order of Australia, for services to medicine in rural and remote Australia, to the eye health of indigenous people, and to professional medical organisations.

Professional and academic associations
Preceded by Kerryn Phelps	President of the Australian Medical Association; 2003–2005	Succeeded by Mukesh Haikerwal
Preceded by Richard Stawell	President of the Royal Australian and New Zealand College of Ophthalmologists; 2011–2012	Succeeded by Stephen Best
