= Royal Australian and New Zealand College of Ophthalmologists =

The Royal Australian and New Zealand College of Ophthalmologists
- Abbreviation: RANZCO
- Formation: 1 July 1997
- Legal status: Company limited by guarantee
- Purpose: Regulation and Representation of Ophthalmologists
- Headquarters: 94–98 Chalmers Street, Surry Hills, New South Wales, Australia
- Region served: Australia and New Zealand
- President: Prof Peter McCluskey AO
- Affiliations: Australian Society of Ophthalmologists, Ophthalmology New Zealand, Australian Vision Research, Save Sight Society of New Zealand Inc.
- Website: https://ranzco.edu/

The Royal Australian and New Zealand College of Ophthalmologists (RANZCO) is the medical college responsible for training and professional development of ophthalmologists in Australia and New Zealand. Founded in 1997 in a merger of the Royal Australian College of Ophthalmologists (est. 1938) and the Ophthalmological Society of New Zealand (est. 1946), the primary headquarters of the college is in Sydney, Australia, with a branch in New Zealand and in each state of Australia.

== College role ==
In Australia and New Zealand, an ophthalmologist is required to have undertaken a minimum of 12 years of training, including:

- 5–7 years at a medical school, graduating with a degree in medicine,
- 2 years (minimum) as a newly qualified doctor undertaking basic medical training,
- 5 years of ophthalmic specialist training and successful completion of examinations set by RANZCO.

Ophthalmologists who have successfully completed the training program of The Royal Australian and New Zealand College of Ophthalmologists are known as Fellows of the college (FRANZCO). There are currently about 700 Fellows in Australia.

RANZCO is responsible for training, examining and representing medical practitioners in the specialty of ophthalmology, who upon completion of training, are equipped to undertake unsupervised ophthalmology practice. The RANZCO Continuing Professional Development Program assists its Fellows and Members in ongoing education and skills training.

RANZCO also has a role in advocating in the area of eye healthcare in Australia, New Zealand and the Asia-Pacific region, and participates alongside the International Council of Ophthalmology (ICO), the International Agency for the Prevention of Blindness (IAPB), and the Commonwealth Eye Health Consortium.

== History ==
In 1899, Dr James Barrett, who had been a founding member of the Ophthalmological Society of the United Kingdom in 1890, worked with Dr A. L. Kennedy from the Victorian Eye and Ear Hospital, to form the Ophthalmological Society of Victoria (OSV), which later became the Eye, Ear, Nose and Throat Section of the Victorian Branch of the British Medical Association (BMA) in 1913. In 1910 the Ophthalmological Society of New South Wales (OSNSW) was founded as an independent body, followed by groups in other states as sections or branches of the British Medical Association: Queensland in 1924, South Australia in 1925, and Western Australia in 1946.

=== Royal Australian College of Ophthalmologists ===
On 23 March 1938, 20 ophthalmologists from various states gathered in Sydney to form the Ophthalmological Society of Australia of the British Medical Association, with Sir James Barrett as its first president. Prior to this, the Intercolonial (later Australasian) Medical Congresses had provided the only vehicle for Australian ophthalmologists to meet and exchange professional ideas. Dissatisfaction with this arrangement led to the successful move to create a national organisation to represent the profession. The Australian society absorbed the OSNSW and the eye sections of the BMA branches from Victoria, Queensland, and South Australia.

In April 1939, the Ophthalmological Society of Australia held its first annual national scientific meeting in Melbourne. This meeting was followed later in 1939 by the publication of Transactions of the Ophthalmological Society of Australia. In the post-war years there was growing dissatisfaction about the standard of ophthalmological training in Australia, which led to the formation of the Australian College of Ophthalmologists in May 1969.

The new college absorbed the members, assets, policies and procedures of the Society. In addition, the new Articles of Association provided for the college to supervise the training of aspiring ophthalmologists and conduct examinations to test and recognise their competence. The college was granted the "Royal" prefix by Queen Elizabeth II in 1977.

=== Ophthalmological Society of New Zealand ===
In 1939 there was an attempt to include New Zealand ophthalmologists in the Australian Society, but this was frustrated by the rules of the British Medical Association. The Ophthalmological Society of New Zealand (OSNZ) found its beginnings in a special meeting in February 1946 organised by Dr Walter Hope-Robertson during the annual conference of the New Zealand Branch of the British Medical Association. Hope-Robertson noted to that meeting that changes to the Social Security Act 1938 by the Labour government of Peter Fraser raised the possibility of a government-paid specialist service in New Zealand, and that there was concern that ophthalmic service fees could be restricted without an appropriate body to lobby for their interests. A few days later, Dr William Fairclough was elected the first society president, and Sir Lindo Ferguson, New Zealand's first fully trained ophthalmologist, was asked to become the society's first patron. At its founding, the OSLiNZ had one woman member, Caroline Stenhouse, who was forced to dine separately to the men at the annual conferences for many years as dinners were held at men's clubs. Dorothy Potter CBE (1922–2009), New Zealand's second woman ophthalmic surgeon, was president of OSNZ in 1984.

=== Presidents (OSNZ) ===
List of presidents of the OSNZ:

- William A. Fairclough (1947–48)
- Rowland P. Wilson (1948–49)
- William H. Simpson (1949–50)
- Leonard S. Talbot (1950–51)
- Eric Lachlan Marchant OBE (1951–52)
- Howard V. Coverdale (1952–53)
- William E. Carswell (1953–55)
- Jack S. Monro (1954–55)
- Walter J. Hope-Robertson (1955–56)
- Duncan C. Macdiarmid (1956–57)
- Cecil A. Pittar (1957–58)
- R. Gair Macdonald (1958–59)
- William L. B. Burns (1959–60)
- Roderick G. S. Ferguson (1960–61)
- Jim I. R. Gray (1961–62)
- Graeme Talbot OBE (1962–63)
- John C. Parr (1963–64)
- (Angus) Leslie Sutherland (1964–65)
- Lenn G. Bell (1965–66)
- C. Calvin Ring (1966–67)
- Kenneth J. Talbot (1967–68)
- Ernest J. Velvin (1968–69)
- Harry Jenner Wales (1969–70)
- Sir Randal F. Elliott (1970–71)
- George de L. Fenwick (1971–72)
- Arthur N. Talbot (1972–73)
- Bernard J. Bowden (1973–74)
- Anthony C. Sandston (1974–75)
- R. John Croke (1975–76)
- Charles Swanston OBE (1976–77)
- Murray R. Ashbridge (1977–78)
- Colin R. Fenton (1978–79)
- R.H. Lindo Ferguson CBE (1979–80)
- Garth G. Powell (1980–81)
- Roderick D. Suckling (1981–82)
- James D.C. Macdiarmid (1982–83)
- W. Roy Holmes (1983–84)
- Dorothy F. Potter CBE (1984–85)
- Hylton LeGrice OBE, CNZM (1985–86)
- David W. Sabiston MNZM (1986–87)
- David Sturman (1987–88)
- Richard S. Clemett (1988–89)
- David C. Warnock (1989–90)
- Harold V. Coop (1990–91)
- David G. Wilson (1991–92)
- Peter C. Wellings (1992–93)
- Anthony C.B. Molteno ONZM (1993–94)
- O. Bruce Hadden CNZM (1994–95)
- S. Douglas Cox (1995–96)
- Philip E. Boulton (1996–97)
- C. Peter Ring (1997–98)

=== Royal Australian and New Zealand College of Ophthalmologists ===
In 1992, discussions began on the full amalgamation of OSNZ and RACO, culminating in 1997 with the joint decision to form a New Zealand Branch of the college. The amalgamation took place on 1 July 1997, with the interim name being the "Royal Australian College of Ophthalmologists incorporating the Ophthalmological Society of New Zealand", pending the resolution of the 1999 Australian republic referendum to determine the royal status of the college. There was discussion about whether the new name should be the "Australasian" or "Australian and New Zealand" College of Ophthalmologists, with the latter choice being favoured by the New Zealanders and was the one eventually chosen. Approval was also required from the Queen regarding the retention of the "Royal" patronage of the new college, which was given in November 2000, with the change of name to "The Royal Australian and New Zealand College of Ophthalmologists".

=== Presidents (OSA/ACO/RACO/RANZCO) ===
- Sir James Barrett (1938–1940)
- Dr Leonard Mitchell (1940–1941)
- Sir Norman Gregg MC (1944–1945)
- Dr Joseph Ringland Anderson MC (1945–1946)
- Dr Darcy Ambrose Williams (1946–1947)
- Dr George Brew (1948–1949)
- Dr Arthur Joyce (1949–1950)
- Dr Walter Lockhart Gibson (1950–1951)
- Dr J. Bruce Hamilton (1951–1952)
- Dr Alfred Ladyman Tostevin (1952–1953)
- Dr Maxwell Clifford Moore AM (1964–1965)
- Dr Hugh Ryan AM (1965–1966)
- Dr Waddy Pockley (1966–1967)
- Dr David Waterworth (1967–1968)
- Dr James Foster (1968–1969)
- Dr Daniel Hart (1969–1970)
- Dr Reuben Hertzberg CBE AM (1970–1971)
- Dr Daniel Wilson (1971–1972)
- Dr Ronald Lowe (1972–1973)
- Dr David Crompton AO (1973–1974)
- Dr Lloyd Cahill MBE (1974–1975)
- Dr Tim Yates (1975–1976)
- Dr James McBride-White (1976–1977)
- Dr James Rogers (1977–1978)
- Dr Eddie Donaldson AO (1978–1979)
- Dr Geoffrey Harley AM (1979–1980)
- Dr Mark Harrison (1980–1981)
- Dr Kenneth George Howsam (1981–1982)
- Dr Remington Pyne (1982–1983)
- Dr Jack Hornbrook (1983–1984)
- Dr Theo Keldoulis (1984–1985)
- Dr Dick Galbraith OBE (1985–1986)
- Dr Ray Whitford (1986–1987)
- Professor Frank Billson AO (1987–1988)
- Dr Frank Sullivan OAM (1988–1989)
- Dr Peter Hardy-Smith OAM (1989–1990)
- Dr Wal Thyer (1990–1991)
- Dr John Milverton (1991–1992)
- Associate Professor Ian Favilla (1992–1993)
- Dr Emmanuel Gregory (1993–1994)
- Associate Professor Justin O'Day AM (1994–1995)
- Dr Geoffrey Morlet OAM (1995–1996)
- Associate Professor Frank Martin AM (1996–1997)
- Dr Brian Lockhart Gibson (1997–1998)
- Dr Bill Gillies OAM (1998–1999)
- Dr Michael Steiner (1999–2000)
- Dr John Crompton (2000–2001)
- Associate Professor Ivan Goldberg AM (2001–2002)
- Dr Bruce Hadden CNZM (2002–2003)
- Dr Peter Henderson (2003–2004)
- Dr Allan Rosenberg (2004–2006)
- Dr Andrew Stewart (2006–2007)
- Dr Iain Dunlop (2007–2009)
- Dr Richard Stawell (2009–2011)
- Dr William Glasson AO (2011–2012)
- Dr Stephen Best (2012–2014)
- Dr Bradley Horsburgh (2014–2016)
- Professor Mark Daniell (2016–2018)
- Associate Professor Heather Mack AM (2018–2020)
- Professor Nitin Verma AM (2020–2022)
- Dr Grant Raymond (2022–2024)
- Professor Peter McCluskey (2024–present)

== Training ==
The RANZCO trains ophthalmologists through the Vocational Training Program, which typically takes 5 years which includes both basic and advanced training. Trainees rotate through different hospitals for clinical development and training. The 7 key roles underpinning selection, training and assessment are: ophthalmic expert and clinical decision maker, communicator, collaborator, manager, health advocate, scholar, and professional.

In January 2010, the Commonwealth Government's Department of Health and Ageing (DoHA) announced that it was to consolidate a range of programs aimed at establishing training places in settings other than the traditional public teaching hospitals into the one Specialist Training Program (STP). The STP is designed to expand the training opportunities for specialist trainees particularly in rural and private practice settings.

== Publications ==
The college publishes a scientific journal, Clinical and Experimental Ophthalmology (Clin. Exp. Ophthalmol.).

== Coat of arms ==
=== Australian arms ===
When the Ophthalmological Society of Australia became the Australian College of Ophthalmologists, there was some discussion among members on adopting armorial bearings for the new college. In 1969, Dr James Foster, the first President of the college, and the Council asked Dr Edward Ryan and Dr Hugh Ryan to finalise a design. With assistance from A. Geoffrey Puttock, a final design was finally submitted to the College Council in 1970. In the Australian Journal of Ophthalmology, Hugh Ryan described the final design as such:

"The design finally submitted to the Council was a shield resting on a grassy mound and supported on one side by the Lion of England and on the other side by the Eagle of the United States of America. These symbolised the debt Australian ophthalmologists owed to these countries. Above the shield was a helmet partly covered with a cloth and a wreath, surmounted by a kangaroo carrying a flaming torch – the torch of knowledge. The shield contained the sun, representing light and life, the staff of Aesculapius with a single serpent, which is a familiar and universal symbol in medicine, and the eye of Horus; to the latter a stalk and tail have been added to represent the “R” used in writing a prescription. This insignia is derived from the ancient Egyptian symbol known as the wedjat-eye or “sound-eye” (i.e. uninjured-eye) of Horus. The symbol is derived from the ancient myth in which the eye of the falcon god Horus was torn into fragments by the wicked god Seth. Later, the ibis god Thoth miraculously restored the injured eye by joining together its parts, whereby the eye regained its title the “sound-eye” or wedjat-eye. The symbol itself represents the human eye with markings of a falcon’s head. Wedjat-eye represents the myth of the restoration of the eye, its parts, exactness and precision, the sum of its parts, the skill and art needed in its restoration. It is a symbol of very great antiquity and was familiar to the world’s first ophthalmic specialists in ancient. The final design and the motto Ut Videamus were submitted to the Council in 1970. It made two alterations: the kangaroo holding the torch of knowledge was slightly altered, and the motto was altered from Ut Videamus (that we may see) to Ut Videant (that they may see). The quotation, of course, is from the Bible and is derived from the story of Bartimaeus, the blind man of Jericho, who, when asked what he wanted, cried out "Domine ut videam” (Lord that I may see). With a small modification to Ut Videamus (that we may see) – meaning that not only our patients should see, but also we ophthalmologists should have the understanding and the skill to heal them – it seemed an appropriate motto. However, the Council altered the motto to read Ut Videant (that they may see), a kind of restricted health benefit."

When the Queen granted the Australia College the right to use the prefix Royal in 1977, in 1978 it was decided to apply to the College of Arms for a formal grant of arms. In granting the arms in 1982, the college made amendments to the design, including that the species of the eagle should be changed to the Bald eagle (Haliaetus leucocephalus) with its wings folded not raised, that the lion and eagle should have a red Tudor rose on their breast, and the removal of the grassy mound compartment.

Coat of arms of the Royal Australian College of Ophthalmologists

Adopted
Granted by the Kings of Arms, 15 March 1982.
Crest
Upon a Helm with a Wreath Or and Vert A Kangaroo holding in the sinister paw a Torch Or enflamed proper.
Helm
A closed Helmet, mantled Vert doubled Or.
Escutcheon
Vert in chief a Sun in splendour and in base a Rod of Aesculapius Or on a Canton of the last the Eye of Horus Sable.
Supporters
Dexter a lion Or and Sinister a Bald-headed Eagle proper on the breast of each a Rose Gules barbed and seeded proper.
Badge
A Plate rayonny Or thereon a Pomeis charged with the Eye of Horus Gold.

=== New Zealand arms ===
In 1993, the Ophthalmological Society of New Zealand obtained its own coat of arms due to the efforts of Dr Dorothy Potter, featuring two Tuatara as supporters and a motto: Latin: E Tenebris Lux ("From Darkness, Light").

=== Amalgamated college arms ===
With the merger of the two bodies in 1997, the New Zealand Herald Extraordinary, Phillip O'Shea, advised that the armorial bearings of OSNZ, like those of the Australian College, would become dormant upon amalgamation. Following an estimation that designing and applying for a new coat of arms might cost around $20,000, the decision was made that a new coat of arms for the amalgamated college would be designed "in-house" by Dr Harold Coop, an Auckland-based ophthalmologist, and that no official sanction would be sought from the College of Arms. This coat of arms was adopted in 2001, and is used in all college publications today.

The arms features a kangaroo supporter to represent Australia and a Kiwi for New Zealand. The appearance and meaning of the escutcheon and the motto (Ut Videant – "That they may see") from the Australian arms granted in 1982 were retained in the new arms, except with the mantling and shield differenced Azure, to use the primary colour of the 1993 OSNZ arms and to represent the Pacific Ocean. The new crest incorporates the national flowers of the two countries – the golden wattle of Australia and the pōhutukawa of New Zealand, in front of a flaming torch to represent enlightenment and learning.
