= William Hamilton (Australian politician) =

Australian politician

The Honourable William Hamilton
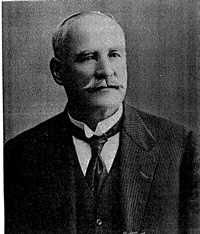

7th President of the Queensland Legislative Council
- In office 15 February 1917 – 17 August 1920
- Preceded by: Arthur Morgan
- Succeeded by: William Lennon

Member of the Queensland Legislative Council
- In office 10 July 1915 – 27 July 1920; Life councillorship

Member of the Queensland Legislative Assembly for Gregory
- In office 25 March 1899 – 10 July 1915
- Preceded by: William Corfield
- Succeeded by: George Pollock

Personal details
- Born: William Hamilton; 3 August 1858 Little Scotland, Geelong, Colony of Victoria
- Died: 27 July 1920 (aged 61) Brisbane, Queensland, Australia
- Resting place: Toowong Cemetery
- Party: Labor
- Spouse: Mary Ann Mitchell (m. 1896)
- Occupation: Shearer; Unionist; Politician

William Hamilton (3 August 1858 – 27 July 1920) was a shearer, trade union official, and member of both the Queensland Legislative Council and Queensland Legislative Assembly.

== Early life ==
Hamilton was born in August 1858 at Geelong, Victoria, to George Hamilton, miner, and his wife Mary Ann (née Richardson). Educated at Heathcote, he began his working career there on the McIvor Creek goldfields before moving to New South Wales in 1875 and then on to Queensland in 1882 where he commenced work as a shearer. In 1885, his work as a miner took him to Croydon in Queensland, the Kimberley region in Western Australia, and Broken Hill, New South Wales before returning to Queensland in 1885 to once again take up shearing.

Taking part in the 1891 shearer's strike, Hamilton led a group of strikers in Clermont. On 7 March the strikers jostled and abused members of the Pastoralists' Association and threw rocks at the accompanying police. While Hamilton himself had called on his men to show restraint, he was charged with criminal conspiracy and sentenced to three years imprisonment, which was served at the St Helena Penal Settlement. When his release was first proposed, Hamilton exclaimed "I will see you in Hell before I'll scab on my mates", and went on to serve the full term.

== Political career ==
At the 1899 election, Hamilton, representing the Labour Party, contested the seat of Gregory and defeated the Ministerialist candidate. He went on to serve Gregory for sixteen years before resigning his seat on 10 July 1915. On that same day Hamilton was appointed by the Ryan Ministry to the Legislative Council, remaining there until his death some five years later.

During his time in parliament, he served as Minister without office for one month in 1915, and on the day of his appointment to the council, Hamilton was promoted to Secretary for Mines. He resigned from the ministry on 15 February 1917 to become President of the Legislative Council following the death of Sir Arthur Morgan and served in that role until his own death in 1920.

== Personal life ==
Hamilton married Mary Ann Mitchell at Rockhampton on 8 June 1896 and together had four children. He died in July 1920 and was awarded a state funeral which proceeded from St John's Cathedral in Brisbane to the Toowong Cemetery.

Parliament of Queensland
Preceded by William Corfield	Member for Gregory; 1899–1915	Succeeded by George Pollock
