= Wally Rae =

Australian politician

Sir Wally Rae KBE

Member of the Queensland Legislative Assembly for Gregory
- In office 5 October 1957 – 7 December 1974
- Preceded by: George Devries
- Succeeded by: Bill Glasson

Personal details
- Born: Wallace Alexander Ramsay Rae; 31 March 1913 Lindfield, New South Wales, Australia
- Died: 18 March 2006 (aged 92) Port Macquarie, New South Wales, Australia
- Party: Country Party
- Occupation: Grazier

Sir Wallace Alexander Ramsay Rae (31 March 1913 – 18 March 2006) was a member of the Queensland Legislative Assembly in Australia. He served in various Queensland Government ministries.

== Biography ==
Rae worked as a stock and station agent before serving as a bomber pilot in World War II. After the war, he bought a property located between Blackall and Isisford.

A member of the Country Party he was elected to the Queensland Legislative Assembly representing the electorate of Gregory in 1957. During his long career in Parliament, he held several ministerial positions including Minister for Local Government and Electricity and Minister for Lands and Forestry. He was later appointed Queensland's Agent-General in London.

In the 1976 Queen's Birthday Honours, he was made a knight bachelor.

He died in Port Macquarie, New South Wales, on 18 March 2006.

Parliament of Queensland
Preceded by George Devries	Member for Gregory; 1957–1974	Succeeded by Bill Glasson
