= Vaughan Johnson (politician) =

Australian politician (1947–2023)

The Honourable Vaughan Johnson OAM

Queensland Government Chief Whip
- In office 3 April 2012 – 31 January 2015
- Premier: Campbell Newman
- Preceded by: Margaret Keech
- Succeeded by: Mick de Brenni

Shadow Minister for Police and Corrective Services
- In office 29 January 2008 – 29 November 2010
- Leader: Lawrence Springborg; John-Paul Langbroek
- Preceded by: Rob Messenger
- Succeeded by: Glen Elmes
- In office 9 February 2003 – 21 September 2006
- Leader: Lawrence Springborg
- Preceded by: Jeff Seeney
- Succeeded by: Rob Messenger

Shadow Minister for Regional Development, Small Business and Industry and Shadow Minister for Aboriginal and Torres Strait Island Partnerships
- In office 17 September 2007 – 29 January 2008
- Leader: Jeff Seeney
- Preceded by: Fiona Simpson (Small Business)
- Succeeded by: Rob Messenger

Shadow Minister for Transport and Main Roads
- In office 21 September 2006 – 17 September 2007
- Leader: Jeff Seeney
- Preceded by: Michael Caltabiano
- Succeeded by: Fiona Simpson
- In office 2 July 1998 – 8 March 2004
- Leader: Rob Borbidge; Mike Horan; Lawrence Springborg
- Preceded by: Jim Elder
- Succeeded by: Fiona Simpson
- In office 2 August 1995 – 19 February 1996
- Leader: Rob Borbidge
- Succeeded by: Jim Elder

Deputy Leader of the Opposition of Queensland Deputy Leader of the Queensland National Party
- In office 2 March 2001 – 4 February 2003
- Leader: Mike Horan
- Preceded by: Lawrence Springborg
- Succeeded by: Jeff Seeney

Minister for Transport and Main Roads of Queensland
- In office 26 February 1996 – 26 June 1998
- Premier: Rob Borbidge
- Preceded by: Jim Elder
- Succeeded by: Steve Bredhauer

Member of the Queensland Parliament for Gregory
- In office 2 December 1989 – 31 January 2015
- Preceded by: Bill Glasson
- Succeeded by: Lachlan Millar

Personal details
- Born: 20 July 1947 Bourke, New South Wales, Australia
- Died: 22 January 2023 (aged 75)
- Party: Liberal National Party (2008–2023)
- Other political affiliations: National Party (1970–2008)
- Spouse: Robin Anne Balchin
- Children: 3
- Occupation: Grazier

Vaughan Gregory Johnson OAM (20 July 1947 – 22 January 2023) was an Australian politician who served in the Legislative Assembly of Queensland from 1989 to 2015.

== Early life ==
Born in Bourke, New South Wales, he was a grazier and contractor before entering politics.

== Political career ==
Having moved to Queensland, he was a councillor on Quilpie Shire Council from 1970 to 1973. From 1972 to 1973, he was Chairman of the Quilpie Branch of the National Party.

In 1989, Johnson was elected to the Legislative Assembly of Queensland as the National Party member for Gregory. He followed the Queensland Nationals into the Liberal National Party in 2008, and held the seat until his retirement in 2015.

=== Government Minister (1996–98) ===
After Rob Borbidge became Premier, Johnson was made Minister for Transport and Main Roads.

=== Opposition frontbencher (1998–2010) ===
Following the heavy coalition defeat at the 2001 election he was elected Deputy National Leader, a position he held until Lawrence Springborg replaced Mike Horan as leader in 2003.

Johnson held many shadow cabinet positions between 1998 and 2010 including Shadow Minister for Sport and the Shadow Minister for Police and Corrections.

Johnson was removed from the frontbench by LNP leader John-Paul Langbroek in November 2010, however he returned as Shadow Parliamentary Secretary for Western Queensland after Langbroek was replaced by Campbell Newman.

Johnson was appointed Government Chief Whip following the LNP victory at the 2012 election.

In October 2014, Johnson announced that he would retire from the Queensland Parliament at the next election. The Premier of Queensland, Campbell Newman, praised his contribution to Queensland, saying "Vaughan will forever be known as the bloke who fought tooth and nail for the farmers and graziers, truck drivers, small business owners and everyone in between right across Western Queensland."

== Controversies ==
In 2014 on Fairfax Radio, Johnson stated "I'm not against Asian people, don't get me wrong – but a lot of those Asian people come from an environment where they have no comprehension of road rules in their own country". Johnson issued a letter later that day apologising for his remarks, adding "I wanted to convey that all drivers in Queensland must take care on the roads".

== Personal life and death ==
Johnson was married with three children.

Johnson died suddenly in the early hours of 22 January 2023, at the age of 75.

== Awards and honours ==
In 2020 he was awarded a Medal of the Order of Australia in the Australia Day honours list.

Parliament of Queensland
Preceded by Bill Glasson	Member for Gregory; 1989–2015	Succeeded by Lachlan Millar
