= Elsa Gye =

Scottish suffragette

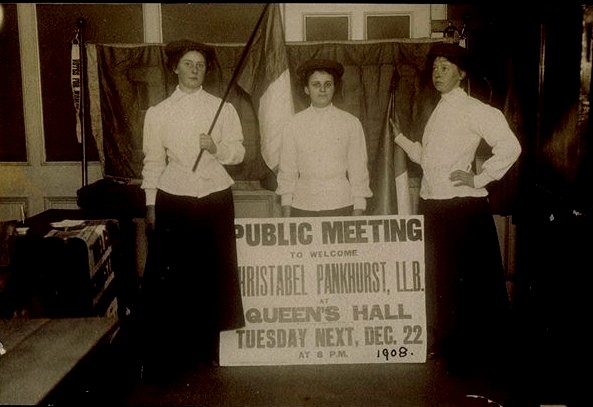
- Charlotte Marsh, Dorothy Radcliffe and Elsa Gye on 22 December 1908 ready to welcome Christabel Pankhurst as she left prison
- Born: 3 October 1881
- Died: 1943 (aged 61–62)
- Education: Guildhall School of Music
- Organization: Women's Social and Political Union
- Known for: suffragette activism and creating the Suffragette Record Room, London
- Spouse: William Ewart Gye (né Bullock) (he took her surname)

Elsa Gye (1881–1943) was a music student at Guildhall who became a suffragette and involved in disruptive events in London and Scotland and was imprisoned for the cause of women's suffrage.

She married the brother of fellow suffragette Daisy Bullock, William Ewart Gye in 1911 whilst he was a medical student at Edinburgh, and had her first child in 1912. He took her surname. Later he went on to work with the Imperial Cancer Research Fund and Gye helped the creation of the Suffragette Record Room in London.

== Early life ==
Elsa was educated at Croydon High School and the Guildhall School of Music.

== Life as a suffragette ==
Gye was one of a large number of women who hid in furniture vehicles and rushed on Parliament on 11–13 February 1908, and was arrested and sentenced to six weeks in prison. She had met Daisy Bullock in 1907 and was with Gladice Keevil, Nellie Martel, Emmeline Pankhurst, Aeta Lamb when they disrupted Chancellor H. Asquith speaking at a meeting in Nottingham. In 1908, Gye worked with Minnie Baldock to open a local branch of Women's Social and Political Union (WSPU) in Nottingham. Gye was taken for a celebration breakfast by WSPU members including former prisoners, at Inns of Court Hotel, Holburn when released from prison in April 1909.

Daisy Bullock's brother William Ewart Gye had studied chemistry in Nottingham and then was a medical student at Edinburgh, when he married Elsa Gye in 1911, whilst a student, with financial support or friends, including Elsa herself. Her husband took her surname and became Dr W.E. Gye.

During Churchill's campaign for the by-election in 1908 in Dundee, after losing his seat in Peckham, Gye went with Rachel Barrett and Helen Fraser to over 200 meetings, spoke at factories and at the large Gaiety Theatre in Dundee, gathering crowds to hear them criticising the Prime Minister's dealings with women over the question of suffrage.

Gye was supportive to Constance Lytton during her first activism in 1909, recommending she should breach the peace to get herself arrested and make speeches to attract attention. She was separated from Lytton in the crowd and the crush affected Lytton's weak heart. She was also one of the organisers with Gladys Keevil of noisy protests at Budget meetings at Bingley Hall, Birmingham on 17 September 1909 when firemen were on standby, and other women used slates thrown from a nearby roof to drown out Asquith's speech.

The mother of fellow suffragette, Elsie Howey wrote to Gye in 1928 to complain about the effect of force feeding on her daughter's voice.

== Later life ==
After the passing of the Representation of the People Act 1918, in which some women within the United Kingdom were first given the right to vote, Elsa Gye's husband worked on cancer research with the Imperial Cancer Research Fund, and on infection in World War I.

== Legacy ==
Gye helped the creation of the Suffragette Record Room in London. At one time no photograph of her was known to exist. She died in 1943.
