= Lachlan Millar =

Australian politician

Lachlan Millar MP

Member of the Queensland Legislative Assembly for Gregory
- Incumbent
- Assumed office 31 January 2015
- Preceded by: Vaughan Johnson
- Majority: 17.2%

Personal details
- Born: 17 December 1970 (age 55) Goondiwindi, Queensland
- Party: Liberal National Party
- Children: 3
- Occupation: ABC rural reporter, media advisor

Lachlan Lucas Millar (born 17 December 1970) is a former Australian politician. He was the Liberal National Party member for Gregory in the Queensland Legislative Assembly from 2015 until his retirement at the 2024 election.

Millar grew up on a family property in the Central Highlands region, attending school in Capella and Emerald. After spending a decade working in the Emerald area, Millar was employed a rural reporter for ABC Local Radio for nine years.

He then operated a small business on the Sunshine Coast where he worked as a public relations manager for Maroochy Shire Council for six years and unsuccessfully stood as a Division 7 councillor in the Sunshine Coast Regional Council local government elections in 2008.

Prior to being elected, he worked as a media advisor to Mike Horan, Lawrence Springborg and John McVeigh.

From 2017 until 2020, Millar was the Shadow Minister for Fire, Emergency Services and Volunteers. In November 2020, Millar was named as Assistant Shadow Minister to the Leader of the Opposition.

Parliament of Queensland
Preceded by Vaughan Johnson	Member for Gregory; 2015–present	Incumbent
