= Bill Glasson (politician) =

Australian politician (1925–2012)

The Honourable Bill Glasson

Member of the Queensland Legislative Assembly for Gregory
- In office 7 December 1974 – 30 November 1989
- Preceded by: Wally Rae
- Succeeded by: Vaughan Johnson

Personal details
- Born: William Hamline Glasson; 23 February 1925 Toowoomba, Queensland, Australia
- Died: 20 March 2012 (aged 87) Brisbane, Queensland, Australia
- Resting place: Lutwyche Cemetery
- Party: National Party
- Spouse: Shirley Margaret Lockhart (m.1949 d.2003)
- Relations: Bill Glasson (son)
- Occupation: Grazier

William Hamline Glasson (23 February 1925 – 20 March 2012) was an Australian politician.

Glasson was born in Toowoomba to Rupert Hamline Glasson and Melda Olive, née Lane. He attended correspondence and state schools and then Church of England Grammar School in East Brisbane. He served in the Royal Australian Air Force from 1943 to 1945 and on his return became a grazier. On 18 August 1949, he married Shirley Margaret Lockhart, with whom he had four children.

A member of the Country Party, he was elected to Winton Shire Council in 1955, serving until 1957. In 1974 he was elected to the Queensland Legislative Assembly as the member for Gregory. He joined the front bench in 1980 as Minister for Lands and Forestry. He served throughout the 1980s but in 1989 lost the position after Russell Cooper became Premier, since Glasson was a loyal supporter of Mike Ahern. As a result, he resigned from Parliament on 30 November 1989, two days before the state election.

Glasson died in Brisbane in 2012 and was buried in Lutwyche Cemetery.

One of Glasson's sons, Bill Glasson, was President of the Australian Medical Association from 2003 to 2005. He unsuccessfully contested the federal electorate of Griffith in 2013 and 2014.

Parliament of Queensland
Preceded by Wally Rae	Member for Gregory; 1974–1989	Succeeded by Vaughan Johnson
