= Ida Mann =

English-Australian ophthalmologist

Professor Dame Ida Mann DBE, FRCS
- Born: Ida Caroline Mann; 6 February 1893; West Hampstead, London, England, UK
- Died: 18 November 1983 (aged 90); Perth, Western Australia, Australia
- Education: London School of Medicine for Women
- Scientific career
- Fields: Ophthalmology
- Workplaces: University of Oxford

Dame Ida Caroline Mann, DBE, FRCS (6 February 1893, West Hampstead, London – 18 November 1983, Perth, Western Australia) was "a distinguished ophthalmologist ... equally well known for her pioneering research work on embryology and development of the eye, and on the influences of genetic and social factors on the incidence and severity of eye disease throughout the world". Only six other women were Fellows at this time.

== Education ==
Mann was educated at Wycombe House School, Hampstead, London. She passed the Civil Service Girl Clerk's examination and took a job at the Post Office Savings Bank.

Despite opposition from her father, she applied to study medicine at the London School of Medicine for Women, the only medical school which was open to women at that time. She passed the matriculation examination in 1914, one of only eight women out of hundreds of passes. She completed her studies, 'with no trouble and intense delight', and qualified Bachelor of Medicine and Bachelor of Surgery (MB, BS) in 1920.

== Early career ==
After qualification she had no clear idea about specialising and applied for all available positions as a houseman (a junior role for newly qualified doctors). She was appointed as the Ophthalmic House Surgeon at St Mary's Hospital, London, under Leslie Paton and Frank Juler. Thus began a lifelong passion for ophthalmic research and practice. During her medical studies she had developed an interest in embryology, working alongside Professor J. E. S. Frazer.

Now she combined this interest with ophthalmology and wrote her thesis on the embryology of the human eye, for which she was awarded her D.Sc. in 1924. To further her career she qualified in general surgery, becoming a Fellow of the Royal College of Surgeons in 1924.

Mann was ambitious and determined to reach the top in her chosen field. To her this meant securing an honorary staff post at Moorfields Eye Hospital, London, and running her own private practice at Harley Street, London. She had achieved both by 1927.

Her stepping stones had been the following posts: Junior Clinical Assistant at Moorfields (1921); staff appointment at the Elizabeth Garrett Anderson Hospital for Women (1922); Senior Clinical Assistant to A. C. Hudson at Moorfields (1922); Pathologist and Assistant Surgeon to Ernest Lane at the Central London Ophthalmic Hospital (1925); staff appointment at the Central London Eye Hospital (1925).

== Second World War ==
At the outbreak of war, Moorfields Eye Hospital was commandeered as a first aid post and the staff were dispersed. The premises in which Mann conducted her private practice were also closed down by the landlord. She found new premises for her own practice and then set about re-siting Moorfields. She found hospital premises in Edgware (10 miles from central London), belonging to the Priory of the Holy Sepulchre, secured the lease, moved the nursing staff there and saw the gradual return of the surgical staff.

There was still a need for a central London site to treat ophthalmic emergencies, and by a mixture of bravado and sheer energy, she managed to re-occupy part of the old Moorfields Hospital on City Road, which remained operational throughout the war despite being bombed. In 1940 she undertook some personal research on the treatment of mustard gas burns of the eye, using laboratories belonging to the Imperial Cancer Research Fund at Mill Hill. It was here she met her future husband, William Ewart Gye, the fund's director.

When the results of her private research became known, she was put in charge of one of the research teams of the Chemical Defence Research Department under the Ministry of Supply. Working with her friend, Davidine Pullinger, and the biochemist, Antoinette Pirie, she worked out the entire pathology of mustard gas keratitis, which afflicted soldiers from the First World War some ten to fifteen years after they had survived a mustard gas attack. Although the team did not find a cure, they were able to alleviate symptoms through the use of contact lenses.

== Oxford ==
During the war, honorary staff were not allowed to resign from their posts at civilian hospitals. Therefore, when Mann applied for, and was appointed to, the post of Margaret Ogilvy Reader in Ophthalmology at the University of Oxford in 1941, she was obliged to combine this research and teaching post with her work at Moorfields in London, her work on the Chemical Defence Research team and her work as a private consultant in London and Oxford.

During her tenure at Oxford, among other achievements, she oversaw the building of the Nuffield Laboratory of Ophthalmology, restarted the diploma courses for post-graduates, inaugurated the Orthoptic School and re-instituted the Oxford Ophthalmological Congress. In her own words, she had 'cleared the Augean stable' in nine months.

Her efforts were recognised by the university in 1945 when she was given a personal professorship: the first woman to receive one at Oxford. She was Titular Professor there from January 1945 until 30 September 1947. Mann was also a Fellow of St Hugh's College, Oxford.

== Marriage ==
Mann became acquainted with William Ewart Gye, known as Bill Gye, who was Director of the Imperial Cancer Research Fund at Mill Hill, and his wife, Elsa, during the war. After Elsa’s death from cancer, Mann and Gye married in December 1944.

Mann became stepmother to her husband's three sons from his first marriage. Mann did not change her name on marriage, as the complications arising from having two Professor Gyes in the same household were easily foreseen.

== Australia ==
Mann had first visited Australia in 1939 as the British Medical Association's representative at the 1st Annual General Meeting of the Ophthalmological Society of Australia (B.M.A.). She flew there in an Imperial Airways Flying Boat, which took a week to fly at low altitude from Southampton to Melbourne. She gave a number of papers and made the return journey "with the feeling that the gloom of Europe would soon descend, and that this brilliant, sunny and friendly land would be blotted from my memory". In 1949 she and her husband set off for Perth and Melbourne on an autumn cruise.

The introduction of the National Health Service in Britain had drastically changed Mann's work and she was dissatisfied with the impact on ophthalmology. Perhaps more pressingly her husband had retired from Mill Hill and was suffering from ill-health which was exacerbated by the English winters. They were immediately smitten with Perth. Mann purchased a bungalow in Dalkeith, resigned from Moorfields, and arranged for all their belongings to be shipped to Australia. Here they conducted experiments on cancer viruses using in-bred strains of mice to ensure consistency. She started a private practice as an ophthalmologist, which was always her insurance against economic uncertainty.

Bill died in 1952, leaving her bereft, of this she said: 'I was unhinged; so tired that I was almost insane'.

== Trachoma research ==
Shortly after her husband's death Mann took an assignment reporting on the incidence of eye disease for the Western Australia Public Health Department. This assignment extended to four years and provided incontrovertible proof of endemic trachoma among the Indigenous population at an early stage when the symptoms were not yet visible.

She traveled extensively throughout Australia and Oceania studying the incidence of eye disease in different races and cultures, with particular reference to the Aboriginal people living in remote communities in Western Australia and the Northern Territory, although she had a particular focus on The Kimberley region. She would often travel to these locations with the Royal Flying Doctor Service and found that, in these communities, up to 80% of residents were suffering from trachoma. This research produced the classic work, Culture, Race, Climate and Eye Disease (1966).

Mann published extensively in the area of eye anatomy and eye disease, publishing many scientific articles and several books. She also wrote on her travels and findings relating to trachoma, published under her married name Ida Gye or a pseudonym, Caroline Gye. These were China 13 and The Cockney and the Crocodile.

== Honors ==
- She was appointed CBE in 1950 and DBE in 1980 for services to the welfare of Aboriginal people.
- She receive an honorary medical degree from the University of Western Australia in 1977.
- She received an honorary Doctor of Science from Murdoch University in 1983.
- She was inducted onto the Victorian Honour Roll of Women in 2001.
- She was inducted into the ASCRS Ophthalmology Hall of Fame in 2007.

== Death ==
Dame Ida Mann died at her home in Perth in 1983, aged 90.

== Publications ==
- Ida Mann, The Development of the Human Eye (Cambridge, 1928)
- Ida Mann, Developmental Abnormalities of the Eye (Cambridge, 1937); (2nd edition, 1957)
- Ida Mann and Antoinette Pirie, The Science of Seeing (Harmondsworth, 1946)
- Ida Mann, Culture, Race, Climate and Eye Disease (Illinois, 1966)
- Caroline Gye, The Cockney and the Crocodile (London, 1962)
- Caroline Gye, China 13 (London, 1964)

Mann's papers are available at the State Library of Western Australia.
