= Aramac State School =

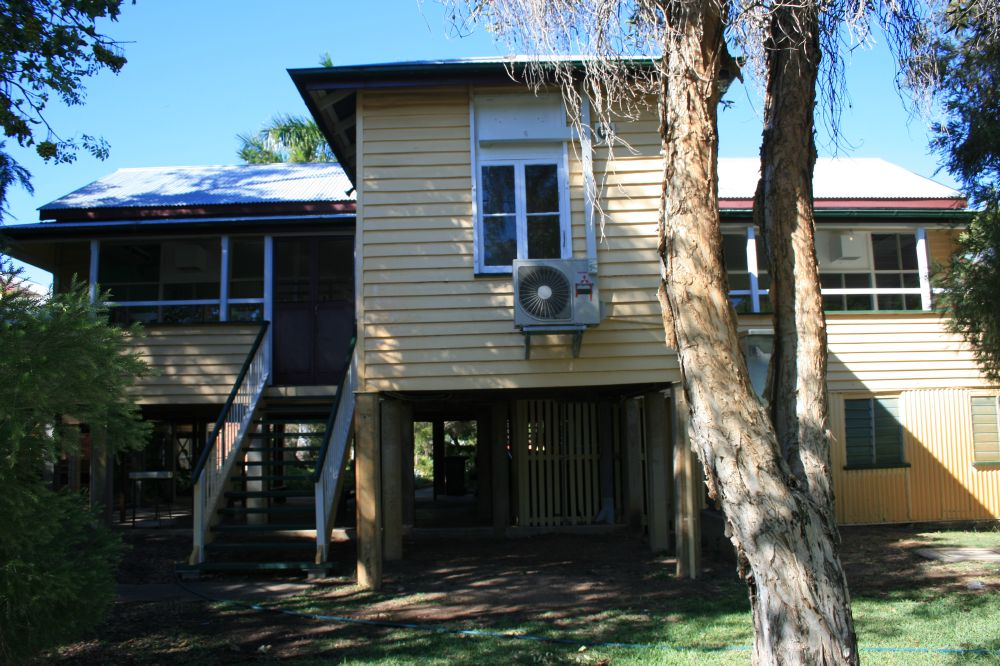
- Aramac State School (Stanley teaching building), 2014

- Location within Queensland
- 22.9746°S 145.2431°E
- Location: 69 Porter Street, Aramac, Barcaldine Region, Queensland, Australia

History
- Built: 1880, 1919, 1928, 1935

Site notes
- Architect: Francis Drummond Greville Stanley

Queensland Heritage Register
- Official name: Aramac State School
- Type: state heritage
- Designated: 10 October 2014
- Reference no.: 602842
- Type: Education, research, scientific facility: School-state
- Theme: Educating Queenslanders: Providing primary schooling
- Builders: McMahon and Cowper

Aramac State School is a heritage-listed state school at 69 Porter Street, Aramac, Barcaldine Region, Queensland, Australia. It was designed by Francis Drummond Greville Stanley and built in 1880 by McMahon and Cowper. It was added to the Queensland Heritage Register on 10 October 2014.

== History ==
Aramac State School, originally established as Aramac Provisional School in 1878, is located in the rural town of Aramac, in central western Queensland. It is important as a school complex which includes significant pre-World War II buildings – a Stanley teaching building (1880), a teacher's residence (1919), a Sectional School (1928), and a domestic science building (1935).

William Landsborough and Nathaniel Buchanan explored the area around Aramac in 1859 and established pastoral leases in the district from 1862. The town of Aramac arose after John William Kingston erected a store in 1867, and later a hotel, beside Aramac Creek. The settlement was declared a town site in 1869 and surveyed in 1875. Thereafter, Aramac acted as a service town for the sparse but growing rural population of the district.

Schooling commenced at Aramac with a temporary provisional school conducted in a rented building, between January and December 1878, with an average attendance of 20 children. In August 1878, the Department of Public Instruction decided to establish a state school at Aramac. Contractors McMahon and Cowper commenced construction of the teaching building and separate teacher's residence on a 5 acres (2.0 ha) site in 1879. After delays obtaining materials the school finally opened on 14 June 1880.

The provision of state-administered education was important to the colonial governments of Australia. In 1848 the New South Wales Government established National Schools. This was continued by the Queensland Government after the colony's creation in 1859. The Education Act 1860 established the Queensland Board of General Education and began to standardise curriculum, teacher training, and facilities. The State Education Act 1875 provided for the further key initiatives of free, compulsory and secular primary education and established the Department of Public Instruction to administer the Act. This move standardised the provision of education and, despite difficulties, colonial educators achieved a remarkable feat in bringing basic literacy to most Queensland children by 1900.

The establishment of schools was considered an essential step in the development of early communities and integral to their success. Locals often donated land and labour for a school's construction and the school community contributed to maintenance and development. Schools became a major community focus for social interaction, a symbol of progress and a source of pride with enduring connections formed with past pupils, parents and teachers. The inclusion of war memorials and halls used for community purposes reinforced these connections together with fetes, markets, public holiday celebrations, school break-up days, fundraisers, polling days, sporting events, reunions, and dances, all held within the schools' buildings and grounds.

From the 1860s until the 1960s, Queensland school buildings were predominantly timber framed, taking advantage of the material's abundance in the state and the high number of builders skilled in its use. This also allowed for easy and economical construction and enabled the government to provide facilities in remote areas. Due to the standardisation of facilities, schools across the state were developed in distinctly similar ways and became complexes of typical components. These components included: teaching building/s, school yard, sports oval, head teacher's residence, and a variety of landscape elements such as sporting facilities or play equipment, playsheds, gardens and trees.

The new Aramac state school comprised a timber school room and separate residence, built to a standard design by Queensland Colonial Architect Francis Drummond Greville (FDG) Stanley, who was then responsible for all government school designs. During his prolific career he was also responsible for many important government and private buildings. For his schools, Stanley became the first to develop standard designs and produce "classes" of buildings that would later evolve into "types". The vast majority of subsequent school buildings in Queensland were built from standard "type" designs.

Stanley's school designs remedied the weatherproofing problem of preceding single-skin school designs by cladding the exterior with chamferboards or weatherboards as well as providing an interior lining. Other distinguishing Stanley design characteristics were: classroom width; the location, size and detailing of windows and central stairs to the verandah aligned with the central entrance door. These were employed throughout the colony as the first deliberately "standard" plans. Although many Stanley school buildings were constructed, few remain and extant examples are rare. Known examples survive at the former Carbrook State School, Tallegalla State School, former Hemmant State School, Kalkie State School and Petrie State School.

The Stanley teaching building and residence were both lowset timber-framed buildings on stumps with gable roofs and verandahs, front and back. The school room, with two three-tiered galleries measured 34 by 18 feet (10.4 m × 5.5 m) with an 11-foot-9-inch (3.58 m) high coved ceiling and a tie beam 10 feet (3.0 m) above the floor. Three narrow windows were housed in each gable end with a door and four pairs of windows to each side elevation. The residence contained two rooms separated by a hall. Its gable ends were clad in corrugated iron and its weatherboard front wall contained a large double-hung window, either side of the front door.

Under the stewardship of the Department of Public Works which retained responsibility for schools until 2013, and through the involvement of some of Queensland's most innovative architects, school buildings became more advanced and diverse. This was the outcome of years of systematic reform and experimentation.

Achieving an ideal or even adequate level of natural light in classrooms, without glare, was of critical importance to educators. After 1900 the virtues of maximum natural ventilation and controlled, high-levels of natural light in teaching buildings were extolled and became a primary determinant of the design concept and layout of all school buildings. Architects experimented with different combinations of roof, ceiling and wall vents, larger windows, dormer windows and ducting. Roof ventilators became fleches which grew larger as the experimentation continued.

In c. 1909 highset timber buildings were introduced, providing better ventilation as well as further teaching space and a covered play space underneath. Windows were rearranged and enlarged to provide a greater amount of gentle, southern light into the room. Desks were rearranged so that the light would fall onto students' left-hand sides to avoid throwing shadows onto the pages; this presupposed that all students would be right-handed. The change in philosophy often meant a complete transformation of the fenestration of existing buildings. Interiors became lighter and airier and met with immediate approval from educators. This was a noticeable new direction and the better lit and ventilated form became a characteristic of Queensland schools.

As a service town to its pastoral district, Aramac was subject to the same vicissitudes as those it served. During the 1890s it suffered the economic consequences of depression, drought, insecure markets, low wool and meat prices and the spread of cattle tick. The town's population fell from 398 in 1881, to 389 in 1891, then 361 in 1901. Aramac did however gain more reliable and rapid transportation via the Central Western Railway line opened in 1886, and a reliable water supply from the establishment of artesian bores.

Even though the population was in decline, the introduction of compulsory school attendance saw the Aramac State School enlarged in 1900. The Stanley teaching building was extended by 20 feet (6.1 m) and included a lavatory and hat room on the southern corner of the rear verandah to a standard design by the Department of Public Works. The southern gable end wall was relocated to form the gable end of the new extension and the new interior walls were unlined. Two new windows were added to the east and west elevations and a fleche to the roof. In 1916, interior walls were lined, the building painted and fly screens were installed on the verandahs and boxed out over the windows.

In Australia, only Queensland offered free accommodation to teachers, the government policy applying to male teachers (only) from as early as 1864. This was partial recompense for low wages; an incentive for teacher recruitment in rural areas and provided onsite caretakers. Refinement of the standard residence design occurred over time, with each modification responding to teacher complaints and Teachers' Union agitation. Following World War I, teacher shortages were blamed on the inadequacy and shortage of teachers' residences. Consequently, many new teacher residences were constructed across Queensland in the 1930s and again following World War II.

From the outset, teachers' residences were built to standards regulated by the Board of General Education rather than to specific designs which varied according to architects responsible. Initially, residences were most often attached as annexes to the classroom building, but from the 1880s were built as detached residences. These residences were very similar in design to the vernacular Queensland house with few, if any, education-specific requirements or features.

Residences designed by the Department of Public Works' architects, and constructed to the high standard demanded by the state, were typically of a higher-quality in design, materials and construction than most similarly scaled private residences. The detached teacher's residence was located within the school grounds at a distance from the teaching buildings, usually with a separate, fenced yard with gardens and trees. The designs ranged from one to four bedrooms and evolved simultaneously with the teaching buildings to keep up with modern needs and styles.

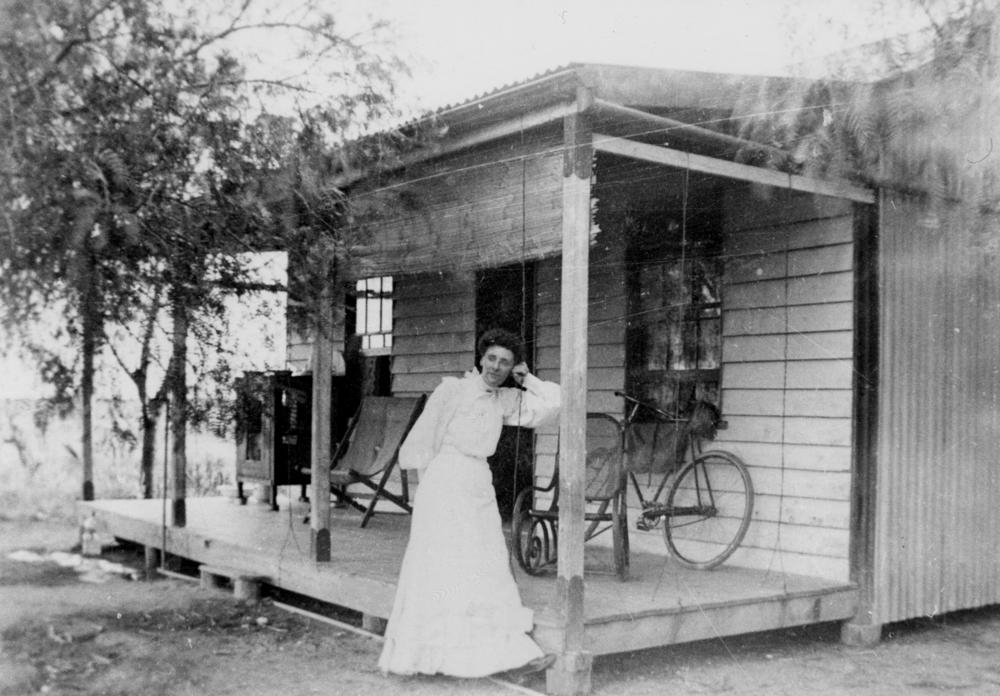
Original teacher's residence (subsequently replaced), Aramac State School, circa 1914

In 1919 a new teacher's residence was constructed at Aramac. Plans for the new teacher's residence show a highset, timber residence with a core of four rooms under a hipped roof, and wide verandahs to three sides under a lower pitched roof, with a dining area, kitchen and bathroom on the rear verandah. The external walls were clad in weatherboards and the internal frame was single skin, lined with v-jointed tongue-and-groove boards. Joinery included double hung windows without hoods.

During the 1920s and 1930s alterations were made to the vast majority of older school buildings to upgrade their lighting and ventilation. In 1921, the fenestration at Aramac State School was altered for improved lighting and ventilation. New 18-light windows (three pairs of casements with fanlights over) replaced the gable end windows with sunshades and flyscreens retained. The gauze to the verandahs was removed to railing height and replaced with tongue-and-groove hardwood boards. In addition, the school was raised on stumps and concrete paving laid to provide additional shaded play space beneath in 1922. Part of the understorey area was enclosed in 1923 to create a domestic science room.

Aramac experienced a revival after the breaking of the Federation drought in 1903. Selection in the Aramac district resumed and the town's population increased to 639 in 1911. In 1913 Aramac Shire opened a tramway connecting Aramac with the Central railway line to Barcaldine and Longreach, which benefitted the shire and the town. Economic slow-down occurred between 1914 and 1919 due to drought, industrial unrest and the departure of men to war. Post-war, the population increased again to about 400 in 1923 but Aramac Shire continued to struggle economically until about 1933.

Improvements to achieve an optimum classroom culminated in 1920 with the Sectional School type, a highset timber structure. This fundamentally new design combined all the best features of previous types and implemented theories of an ideal education environment. It proved very successful and was used unaltered until 1950. This type was practical, economical, and satisfied educational requirements and climatic needs. Most importantly, it allowed for the orderly expansion of schools over time. By late 1914, in accordance with the accepted principles, buildings were optimally orientated to maximise natural light from the south. Before the Sectional School, solar orientation was not a key consideration and all school buildings were positioned in relation to the street and property boundaries. The Sectional School type had only one verandah typically on the northern side, allowing the southern wall, with a maximum number of windows, to be unobstructed. The building was designed so that the blank end wall could be detached as the school grew and the building extended in sections, hence the name. This led to the construction of long narrow buildings of many classrooms - a distinctive feature of Queensland schools.

In 1928, a Sectional School building was constructed at Aramac State School providing accommodation for an extra 80 pupils. It comprised two rooms, 21 by 18 feet (6.4 m × 5.5 m), with a north facing verandah and was located southeast of, and at right angles to, the existing school. There were double hung windows in the northern wall of the classrooms and large banks of casements in the southern walls. The classrooms were lined with vertical boards and the coved ceiling was braced with metal ties. A teachers' room was also added to the western verandah of the Stanley building as part of these improvements.

Vocational education was a Queensland Government priority to support the development of primary industries; this evolved after World War I into a variety of subjects. Vocational training within primary education began in 1895 with drawing classes and expanded to include domestic sciences, agriculture, and sheet metal and wood working classes. The subjects required a variety of purpose-built facilities and were initially gender segregated. Standard, purpose-designed vocational buildings were first introduced in 1928. In 1936 the Minister for Education permitted students to take vocational subjects in lieu of geography or history in the Junior Examination, increasing the subjects' popularity.

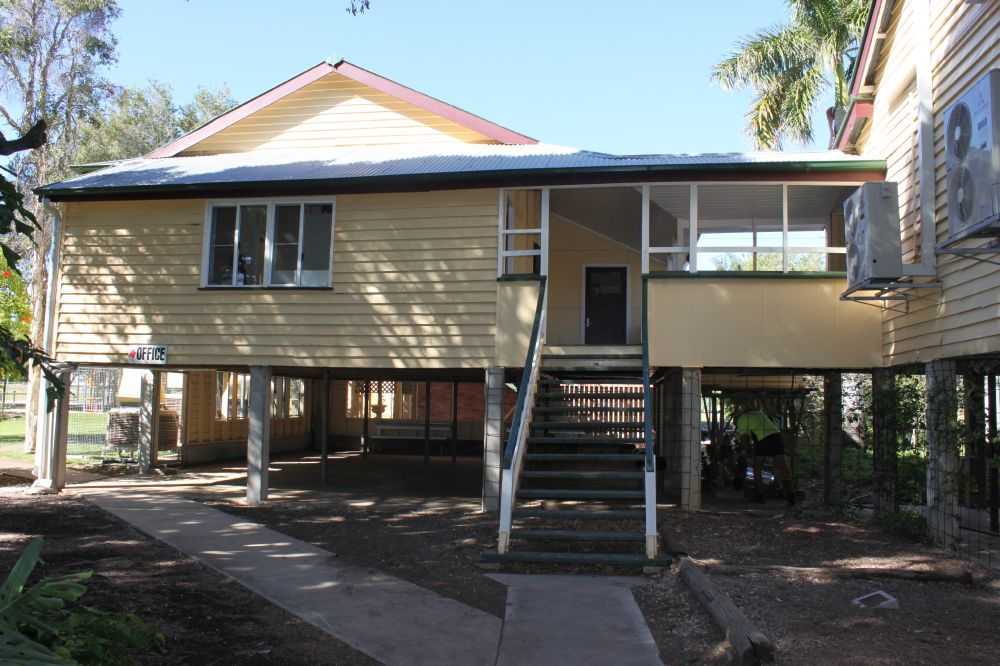
Domestic science building, 2014

Aramac State School received its domestic science classroom building in 1935. The highset timber-framed structure, clad in weatherboards, with a half-hipped roof clad in corrugated iron was built to the northeast of the original school and contained a cookery and dressmaking room 21 by 18 feet (6.4 m × 5.5 m), lined with vertical boards, with a coved ceiling and metal tie rod. Its south facing verandah was flyscreen lined, and return wings on the east and west sides accommodated a fitting room and laundry respectively. As part of this program of works, the back verandah of the teacher's residence was also enclosed and the kitchen extended.

Between the 1960s and the 1980s Queensland education was reformed and the teaching buildings at Aramac State School were altered as a result. The Education Act 1964 was a turning point and the first major update of Queensland education's governing legislation since 1875. Effectively, a new era of state education evolved, requiring new architectural responses. The Department of Education (as it had been renamed in 1957) continued to give the responsibility of building design to the architects of the Department of Public Works. With new educational philosophies, government policies and functional requirements combined with new architectural styles, materials and technologies, the evolution of standard designs became more fragmented. Rather than "improving" on the previous designs, architects began to design with inspiration drawn from new precedents. Fundamentally, timber construction was no longer favoured and buildings were no longer predominantly highset.

Post-World War II, was a period of growth for Aramac with the town's population peaking in 1961 at 654. Plans for enlarging the school grounds were produced by the Land Administration Board in 1948, and in 1964–5 a high school opened at Aramac State School. The new secondary department was built to the south of the original school in 1964 and a new general purpose classroom and commercial classroom was built in 1966. An additional classroom was as added to the eastern end of the Sectional School in 1969 and the domestic science building received a new fitout.

Other school improvements dating from the 1960s included the replacement of the casement windows on the Stanley teaching building with louvres in 1963 and a partition wall was added which required the removal and relocation of the door. Hat and bag racks were added to the verandah and the eastern end of the domestic science building was enclosed for a library. The Sectional School building was extended by 8 feet (2.4 m) for a new staff room.

The school continued to expand in the 1970s with the construction of the two storey masonry building to the east of the domestic science building in 1973. The original Stanley school building was converted to an activity centre in 1976 – the gable windows were infilled and the central partition was removed.

Aramac State School has been a focus for the local community as a place of important social and cultural activity. Centenary celebrations were held by the school between 30 March and 2 April 1978. With the general downturn in the rural economy the town's population has declined to 428 in 1981 and 299 in 2011. In 2014, the primary and secondary school continues to operate from the site and the primary school retains the Stanley teaching building as an activity centre, the Sectional School building as classrooms, the domestic science building for home economics, and the residence continues to be used as teacher's accommodation.

The school is important to the town and district having operated since 1880 and educated generations of Aramac students. Since establishment it has been a key social focus for the Aramac community with the grounds and buildings having been the location of many social events over time.

== Description ==
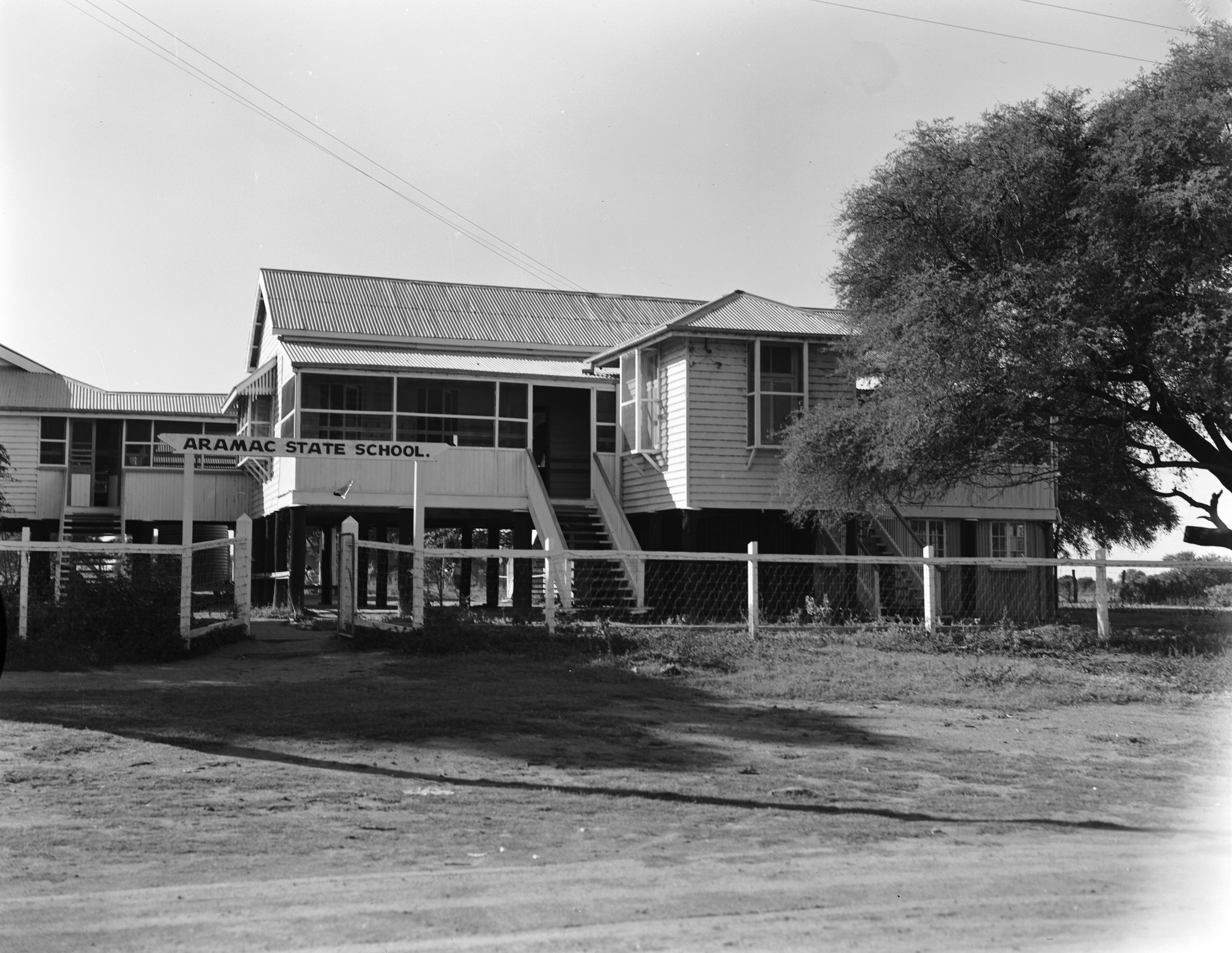
Aramac State School, 1955

Aramac State School is located on a level site on Porter Street on the southern side of township, near the intersection of the Barcaldine-Aramac Road and Aramac Creek. The complex comprises significant early school buildings and residence, as well as a secondary school and later facilities with grounds extending between McWhannell and Drury Streets that incorporate an oval and cricket pitch.

The three early school buildings are linked by verandahs to form a U-shape. Fronting the school but concealed by a heavily vegetated western boundary is the original 1880 Stanley teaching building. Behind and perpendicular to it is the 1928 Sectional School to the south and the 1935 Vocational building to the north. The 1919 residence is separately fenced and located a short distance to the north of the school along Porter Street, while the secondary school and other structures are located to the south.

The Stanley teaching building is a timber-framed building, highset on concrete stumps and clad in weatherboards, with a metal clad gable roof and verandahs to the west and east. Attached to the centre of western verandah, which has a sheeted raked ceiling and weatherboard balustrade, is the 1928 teacher's room addition, which is of similar construction with a hipped roof and original joinery. The eastern verandah with bag racks forming the balustrade, extends to the north and south connecting to the verandahs of the Sectional School and domestic science buildings. The understorey is open, except at the southern end, where a workshop area is located. There is a set of stairs leading from the eastern verandah with one of two sets of stairs from the western verandah remaining. The interior walls of the school building are lined with v-jointed tongue-and-groove boards and the coved ceiling with wider beaded boards contains a lattice ceiling vent. A timber cover strip conceals the junction between the original building and its 1900 addition. The gable end windows have been infilled with lining boards and there are two pairs of French doors between two large windows housing four fixed lights above eight banks of louvres in both the east and west elevations. The original door opening has been enclosed with weatherboards.

The Sectional School is a timber framed, weatherboard clad building, highset on concrete stumps with a corrugated metal clad gable roof, north-facing verandah, large window openings in the north and south walls and an open understorey. Fixed glazing is located above the windows in the northern wall where double hung sashes have been replaced with sliding aluminium. Door openings retain their fanlights above single-light flush panel doors which have replaced French doors. Windows in the south wall have sheeted-in fanlights over four banks of sliding aluminium sashes which have replaced timber casements. The school building comprises two rooms interconnected through a large opening in the partition wall. Walls and the coved ceiling are lined with v-jointed tongue-and-groove boards, and the verandah and internal partition wall are single-skin. Lattice ceiling vents and metal bracing ties are located in the centre of each room.

The domestic science building is a timber framed, weatherboard clad building, with a corrugated metal clad half-hipped roof, highset on concrete stumps with a partially walled, open understorey. Its south facing verandah is enclosed at its eastern end to form a library and the western end has a bag rack balustrade. The entrance to the domestic science room from the verandah has a fanlight over a pair of panelled French doors. The interior is lined with v-jointed tongue-and-groove boards, and a lattice ceiling vent and metal bracing tie are located at the centre of the coved ceiling. Original cupboards are located in the southeast and across the southwest corner and the workspaces have a c. 1960s fitout. Flanking rooms to the east and west, house a sewing room and laundry respectively. Both have raked ceilings and are accessible from the domestic science room. Window sashes in both these rooms have been replaced with aluminium sliding windows. The laundry retains an early cupboard across the northeast corner and early door joinery to the verandah. There are later access stairs to the eastern elevation and southern verandahs.

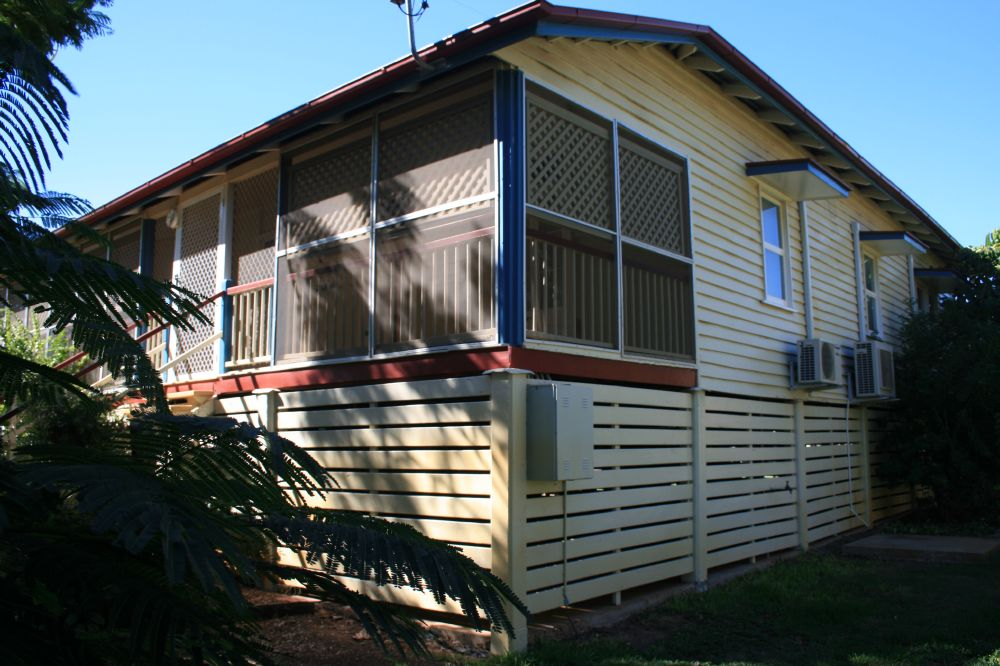
Teacher's residence, 2014

The teacher's residence is highset on concrete stumps with later panels of wide horizontal battens enclosing the understorey. It has a hipped roof clad in corrugated metal sheeting without soffits and its verandah is supported on timber posts with recent lattice panels above a dowel balustrade. The external walls are clad in weatherboards and the verandah and internal partitions are single-skin lined with v-jointed tongue-and-groove boards. Original joinery includes four panel doors, three-light low waisted French doors onto the verandahs with fanlights (external walls) or fixed fretwork (internal walls) and double hung windows with recent hoods. The interior layout comprises three bedrooms, living room and hall in the central core, with verandahs to the west and north and a dining area, bathroom and kitchen on the eastern verandah. The timber frame is generally lined on one side with vertical v-jointed tongue-and-groove board. The living room ceiling, rear verandah and kitchen are lined with flat sheeting. Original front and rear stairs have been replaced.

The other buildings and structures on the site are not of State cultural heritage significance.

== Heritage listing ==
Aramac State School was listed on the Queensland Heritage Register on 10 October 2014 having satisfied the following criteria.

The place is important in demonstrating the evolution or pattern of Queensland's history.

Aramac State School, opened in 1880 (initially established in 1878 as Aramac Provisional School), is important in demonstrating the evolution of state education, and its associated architecture, in Queensland.

The place retains excellent, representative examples of standard government designs that were architectural responses to prevailing government educational philosophies. The teaching building designed by architect FDG Stanley is an early standardised design; the teacher's residence resulted from a government initiative to address the state's post-WWI teacher shortage; the Sectional School building demonstrates the culmination of many years of experimental timber school design providing equally for educational and climatic needs; and the domestic science building reflects the Queensland Government's focus on vocation education as a way of ensuring the state's economic prosperity.

The place demonstrates rare, uncommon or endangered aspects of Queensland's cultural heritage.

The Stanley teaching building at Aramac State School is rare as one of six known surviving examples of this once common type.

The place is important in demonstrating the principal characteristics of a particular class of cultural places.

Aramac State School is important in demonstrating the principal characteristics of an early Queensland state school complex, comprising: a Stanley teaching building (1880) with an extension (1900), a Sectional School building (1928); a teacher's residence (1919) and a domestic science building (1935) constructed to standard designs by the Queensland Government. Standing on a landscaped site, the buildings are positioned to allow natural ventilation and daylighting of the interiors. Each of these buildings is highset, of timber-framed construction, clad in weatherboards and have interiors lined in tongue-and-groove boarding.

In particular, the standard designs represented at Aramac are:

- the Stanley teaching building, with its gable roof, front and rear verandahs, centrally placed stairs and coved ceiling;
- the Sectional School building with gable roof, northern verandah, large south-facing windows, coved ceiling with metal tie beam and subsequent classroom duplication;
- the domestic science building, an intact pre-World War II vocational building with large, airy classroom and flanking sewing and laundry rooms;
- and the teacher's residence comprising a four-room core, front and side verandahs and rear dining verandah with bathroom and kitchen.

Changing philosophies in state primary education are evident in the modifications made to these buildings, including attached teacher's rooms, enlarged windows and verandah bag racks.

The place has a strong or special association with a particular community or cultural group for social, cultural or spiritual reasons.

Queensland schools have always played an important part in Queensland communities - as a venue for social interaction, volunteer work, and as a source of pride, symbolising local progress and aspirations. They typically retain a significant and enduring connection with former pupils, their parents, and teachers. Aramac State School has a strong and ongoing association with the Aramac community. It was established through the efforts of the local community and has educated generations of Aramac children. The place is important for its contribution to the educational development of Aramac and is a prominent community focal point and gathering place for social events with widespread community support.
