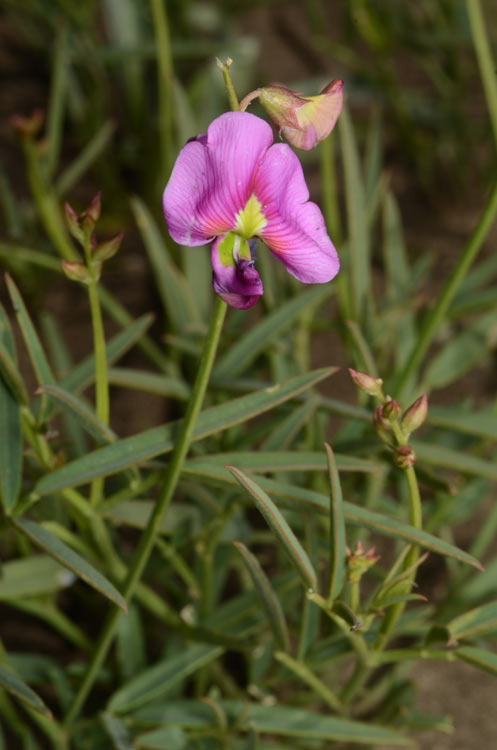
- West of Blackall

Scientific classification
- Kingdom: Plantae
- Clade: Tracheophytes
- Clade: Angiosperms
- Clade: Eudicots
- Clade: Rosids
- Order: Fabales
- Family: Fabaceae
- Subfamily: Faboideae
- Genus: Swainsona
- Species: S. campylantha

Binomial name
- Swainsona campylantha F.Muell.

Synonyms
- Swainsona fragilis F.M.Bailey; Swainsonia campylantha F.Muell. orth. var.

= Swainsona campylantha =

Species of legume

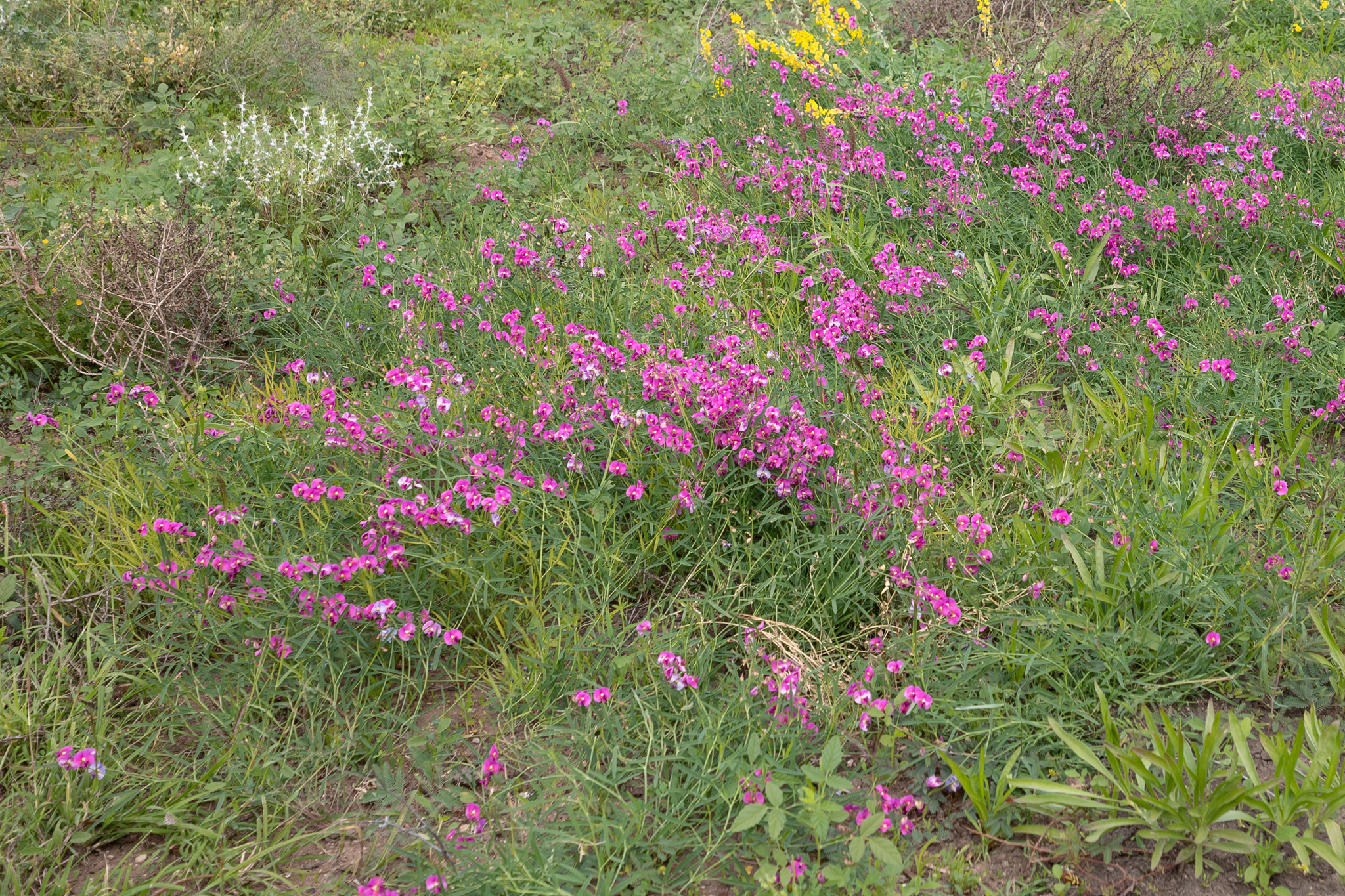
Habit near Aramac

Swainsona campylantha, commonly known as Gilgai Darling pea, is a species of flowering plant in the family Fabaceae and is endemic to inland areas of Australia. It is a low-growing perennial with imparipinnate leaves usually with up to 7 narrowly lance-shaped to narrowly elliptic leaflets, and racemes of 2 to 10 pink to purple flowers.

== Description ==
Swainsona campylantha is a low-growing perennial herb, that typically grows to a height of up to 25 cm (9.8 in) with more or less glabrous, strongly ribbed stems. Its leaves are imparipinnate, mostly 30–60 mm (1.2–2.4 in) long on short petiole with up to 7 narrowly lance-shaped to narrowly elliptic leaflets 5–60 mm (0.20–2.36 in) long and 1–5 mm (0.039–0.197 in) wide. There are stipules 1–15 mm (0.039–0.591 in) long at the base of the petiole. The flowers are arranged in racemes 50–100 mm (2.0–3.9 in) long of 2 to 10 on a peduncle 1.5–3 mm (0.059–0.118 in) long, each flower 7–10 mm (0.28–0.39 in) long. The sepals are joined at the base, forming a tube about 2 mm (0.079 in) long, the sepal lobes about the same length as the tube. The petals are pink to purple, the standard petal 15–25 mm (0.59–0.98 in) long and 10–15 mm (0.39–0.59 in) wide, the wings crescent-shaped and 7–11 mm (0.28–0.43 in) long, and the keel 7–10 mm (0.28–0.39 in) long with a broad, erect, beak-like tip. Flowering depends on the environment, and the fruit is an elliptic or oblong pod mostly 10–30 mm (0.39–1.18 in) long and 6–7 mm (0.24–0.28 in) wide with the remains of the strongly curved style about 6 mm (0.24 in) long.

== Taxonomy and naming ==
Swainsona campylantha was first formally described in 1859 by Ferdinand von Mueller in New South Wales - Parliamentary Papers- Votes and Proceedings of the Legislative Assembly, from specimens collected by Augustus Charles Gregory "on the plains along Cooper's River. The specific epithet (campylantha) means "bent or curved flowers".

== Distribution and habitat ==
This species of pea grows in heavy red or black soils in depressions and along creek lines and is widespread in Queensland, the southern parts of the Northern Territory, northern South Australia, north-western New South Wales and northern Western Australia.
