= Bowen Downs Station =

Pastoral lease and cattle station in Queensland

Coordinates: 22.469°S 145.003°E

Location in Queensland

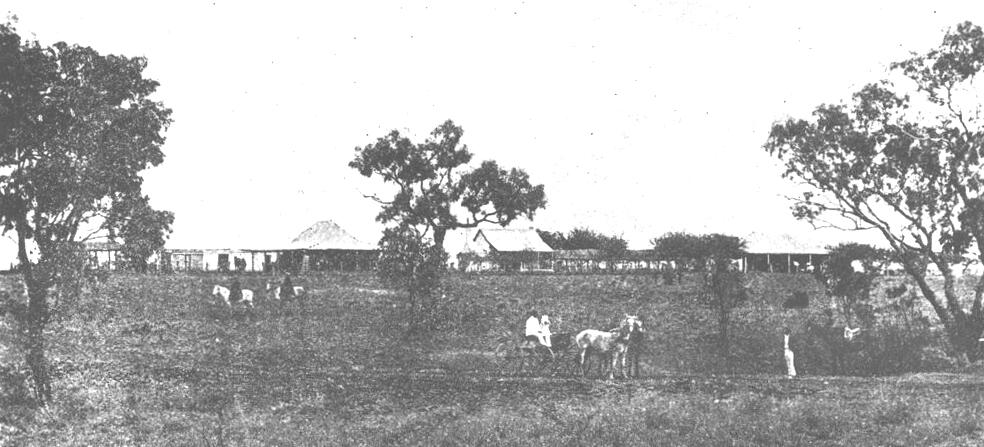
Tuaburra, an outstation of Bowen Downs Station, 1898

Bowen Downs Station is a pastoral lease that has operated both as a cattle station and a sheep station.

It is located about 49 kilometres (30 mi) east of Muttaburra and 61 kilometres (38 mi) north west of Aramac in the outback of Queensland. It is watered by the Thomson River and tributaries Reedy Creek and Cornish Creek that all run through the property.

== History ==
The traditional owners of the area are the Iningai peoples. Iningai (also known as Yiningay, Muttaburra, Tateburra, Yinangay, Yinangi) is an Australian Aboriginal language spoken by the Iningai people. The Iningai language region includes the landscape within the local government boundaries of the Longreach Region and Barcaldine Region, particularly the towns of Longreach, Barcaldine, Muttaburra and Aramac as well as the properties of Bowen Downs and catchments of Cornish Creek and Alice River.

The first Europeans to visit the area were the explorers William Landsborough and Nathaniel Buchanan, who passed through in 1860. Landsborough named the area Bowen Downs after the Queensland Governor, Sir George Bowen. By 1861 the area was opened for settlement and the pair applied for the lease. To finance the station Landsborough and Buchanan formed a partnership with Robert Morehead and Matthew Young, of the Scottish Australian Investment Company, and Edward Cornish, a friend of Landsborough.

The property was established in 1862, and was the last post at which people travelling further inland could purchase provisions. Nat Buchanan was the initial manager of the property, which was stocked with 3,000 cattle. The property occupied an area of 1,500 square miles (3,885 km^{2}) at the time. Aramac Station, to the south of Bowen Downs, was next to be settled in 1863.

Following a period of drought, Buchanan walked off Bowen Downs in 1867, abandoning his one eighth share to Morehead.

By 1870 the run was regarded as one of the finest in Australia stretching over 200 kilometres (124 mi) across the plains of Central Queensland and covered with Mitchell grass supporting a herd of 60,000 cattle. Harry Redford and his accomplices George Dewdney and William Rooke stole between 600 and 1,000 cattle, then overlanded the stock approximately 1,300 kilometres (808 mi) down Cooper Creek to outback South Australia. The trek took over three months and the men sold the stock for £5000 to Blanchewater Station. Station employees tracked the herd and Redford was eventually arrested for the crime.

During the 1870s and 1880s, much of the labouring on the property was being performed by blackbirded South Sea Islanders. Some of these Islanders died on the 800-kilometre (500 mi) journey they were required to take from the coast to Bowen Downs.

In 2013 the property was acquired by the Hartley family who had just sold their Barcaldine properties. They paid A$9.7 million for the 44,500-hectare (109,962-acre) property that adjoined other properties in their portfolio.

== See also ==
- List of ranches and stations
