= Marra Wonga =

Site of ancient Aboriginal rock art in Queensland, Australia

Marra Wonga (or Turraburra), formerly known as Gracevale, is a major Aboriginal rock art site near Barcaldine in Queensland, Australia. The location of a sandstone escarpment forming a rock shelter over 160 metres in length, it comprises 111 stencils and over 15,000 petroglyphs (carvings), the oldest of which date back more than 5,000 years. The petroglyphs are mostly lines, grooves, drilled holes, and representations of animal tracks, although a cluster of human feet with six toes is carved into the floor of the shelter. Amongst the unique compositions to be found at Marra Wonga are "engraved star-like designs with central engraved pits and large, engraved snake-like designs running across and through other petroglyphs".

In 2019, the site was purchased for the custodians of the local Iningai people by the Indigenous Land and Sea Corporation (ILSC) of the Australian Government. It is now managed by the Yambangku Aboriginal Cultural Heritage and Tourism Development Aboriginal Corporation (YACHATDAC) and there are plans to open a multimillion-dollar education centre.

== See also ==
- Rock art
- Indigenous Australian art
