= Acacia microcybe =

Scientific classification
- Kingdom: Plantae
- Clade: Tracheophytes
- Clade: Angiosperms
- Clade: Eudicots
- Clade: Rosids
- Order: Fabales
- Family: Fabaceae
- Subfamily: Caesalpinioideae
- Clade: Mimosoid clade
- Genus: Acacia
- Species: A. microcybe

Binomial name
- Acacia microcybe Pedley
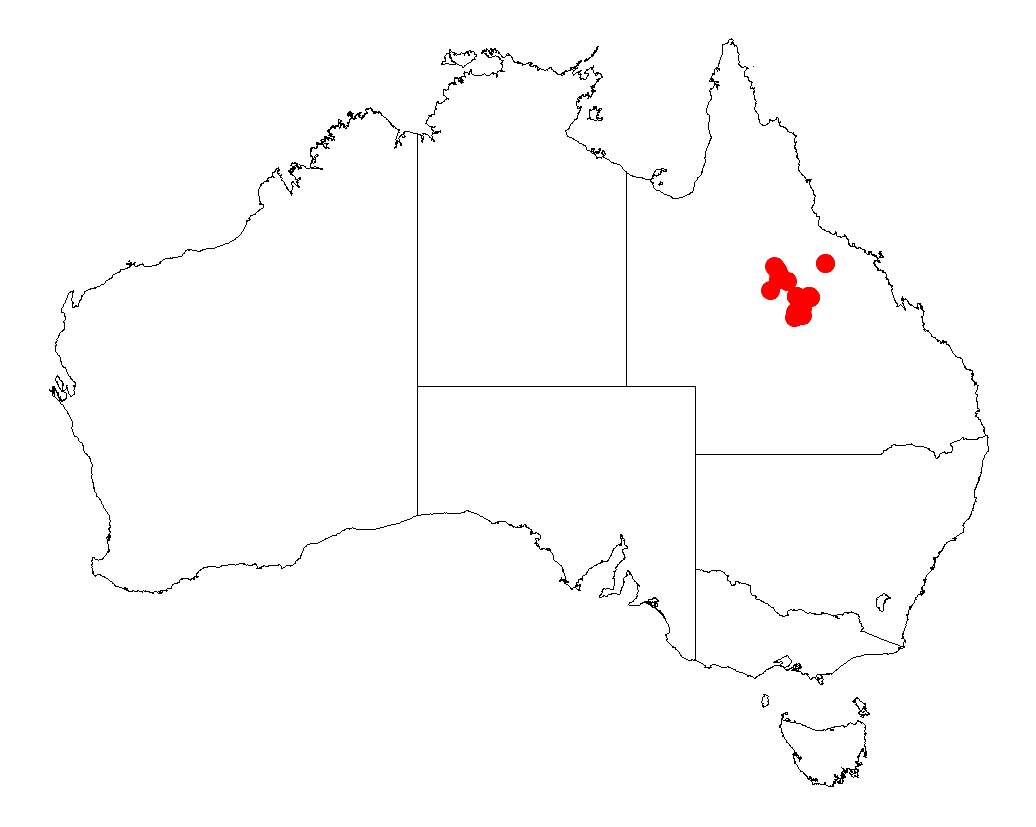
- Occurrence data from AVH

Synonyms
- Acacia microcephala Pedley nom. illeg.; Racosperma microcephalum (Pedley) Pedley

Species of legume

Acacia microcybe is a species of flowering plant in the family Fabaceae, and is endemic to west-central Queensland, Australia. It is a tree with finely fissured bark, hairy branchlets, linear phyllodes, spherical heads of golden yellow flowers, and papery to very thinly crusty pods, appearing more or less like a string of beads.

== Description ==
Acacia microcybe is a tree that typically grows to a height of 3–10 m (9.8–32.8 ft) and has finely fissured, dark grey bark and branchlets with sparsely to moderately hairy branchlets, the hairs pressed against the surface. Its phyllodes are linear, straight to slightly curved, 65–135 mm (2.6–5.3 in) long, 1–2 mm (0.039–0.079 in) wide with a curved to hooked tip and many closely parallel, indistinct veins. The flowers are borne in up to six spherical heads in racemes on peduncles 2–7 mm (0.079–0.276 in) long, the heads 3.5–4.0 mm (0.14–0.16 in) in diameter with 10 to 20 golden yellow flowers. The pods are up to 45 mm (1.8 in) long, 3–4 mm (0.12–0.16 in) wide, papery to very thinly crusty and appearing somewhat like a string of beads. The seeds are elliptic, 3–4.5 mm (0.12–0.18 in) long and glossy brown with a small aril.

== Taxonomy ==
This species was first formally described in 1978 by Leslie Pedley who gave it the name Acacia microcephala in the journal Austrobaileya from specimens collected at Corinda, about 80 km (50 mi) north of Aramac by Selwyn Lawrence Everist in 1949. But that name was illegitimate, and in 2006, Pedley changed the name to Acacia microcybe in a later edition of Austrobaileya. The specific epithet (microcybe) is derived from Greek meaning 'small head'.

== Distribution and habitat ==
This species of wattle has a limited distribution in North West Queensland to the north and north west of Aramac growing in alkaline, hard, stony, clay soils.

== Conservation status ==
Acacia microcybe is listed as 'least concern', under the Queensland Government Nature Conservation Act 1992.

== See also ==
- List of Acacia species
