= Tablederry, Queensland =

Tablederry Queensland
- Coordinates: 22.3947°S 144.5105°E
- Population: 32 (2016 census)
  - Density: 0.01954/km^{2} (0.0506/sq mi)
- Postcode(s): 4732
- Area: 1,637.7 km^{2} (632.3 sq mi)
- Location: 24.8 km (15 mi) N of Muttaburra; 109 km (68 mi) NW of Aramac; 177 km (110 mi) NNW of Barcaldine; 1,247 km (775 mi) NW of Brisbane
- LGA(s): Barcaldine Region
- State electorate(s): Gregory
- Federal division(s): Maranoa
Suburbs around Tablederry:
Corfield	Prairie	Prairie
Bangall	Tablederry	Cornish Creek
Longreach	Muttaburra	Cornish Creek

Tablederry is a former rural locality in the Barcaldine Region, Queensland, Australia. In the 2016 census, Tablederry had a population of 32 people.

On 22 November 2019, the Queensland Government decided to amalgamate the localities in the Barcaldine Region, resulting in five expanded localities based on the larger towns: Alpha, Aramac, Barcaldine, Jericho and Muttaburra. Tablederry was incorporated into Muttaburra.

== Geography ==
The Hughenden Muttaburra Road passes through the locality from the north to the south-east. The Cramsie Muttaburra Road passes through the locality from the south-west to the south.

The Bangall, Landsborough and Towerhill Creeks flow through the locality towards Muttaburra.

The predominant land use is grazing cattle on native vegetation.

== Economy ==
In 2017, the 4832 postcode (which includes Tablederry) was one of the lowest 10 postcodes by income level in Australia, with an average income of $21,415.

== Education ==
The nearest primary school is in Muttaburra. The nearest secondary school is in Aramac but only provides education up to Year 10. The nearest secondary schools that offers education through to Year 12 are in Barcaldine, Longreach and Winton.
