= AXC =

AXC may refer to:

- AXC, the IATA code for Aramac Airport, Queensland, Australia
- AXC, the ICAO code for Indochina Airlines, a defunct Vietnamese airline based in Ho Chi Minh City
