= Aramac Tramway Museum =

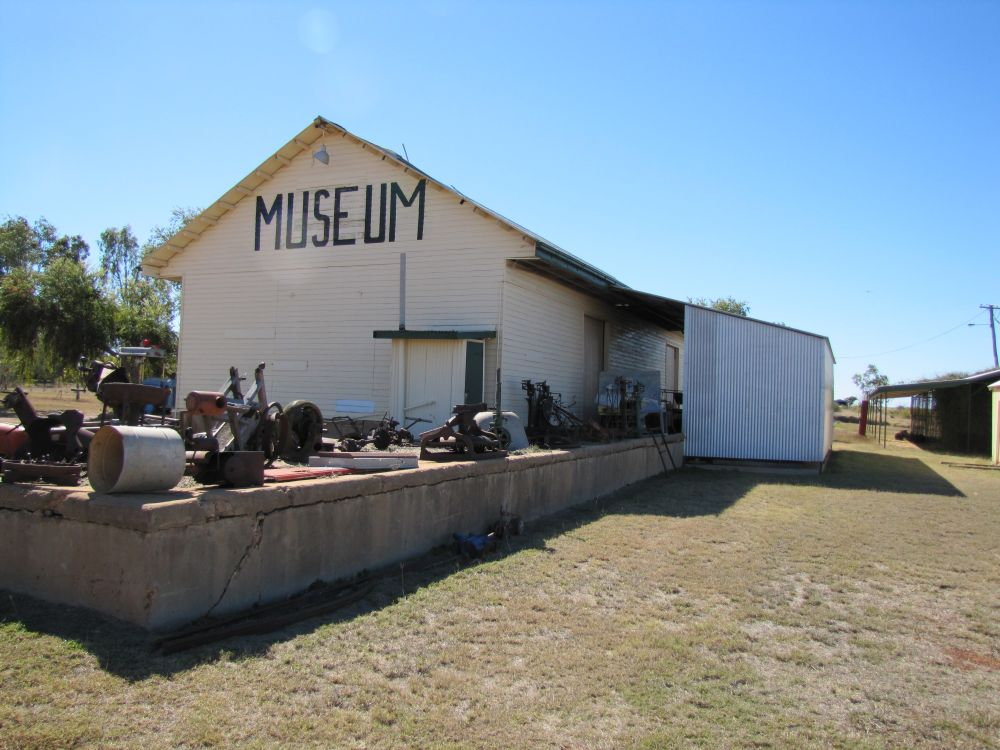
- Aramac Tramway Museum, 2011

- Location within Queensland Location within Australia
- 22.9752°S 145.2462°E
- Location: Boundary Street, Aramac, Barcaldine Region, Queensland, Australia

History
- Design period: 1900 - 1914 (early 20th century)
- Built: 1912 - 1913

Queensland Heritage Register
- Official name: Aramac Tramway Museum, Aramac Tramway Station
- Type: state heritage (archaeological, built)
- Designated: 26 November 1999
- Reference no.: 601172
- Significant period: 1912-1970s (historical); 1912 - ongoing (social)
- Significant components: shed - goods, platform, yards - livestock, out building/s, machinery/plant/equipment - transport - rail

Aramac Tramway Museum is a heritage-listed former tramway station and now a museum at Boundary Street, Aramac, Barcaldine Region, Queensland, Australia. It was built from 1912 to 1913. It is also known as Aramac Tramway Station. It was added to the Queensland Heritage Register on 26 November 1999.

== History ==
The Aramac Tramway Museum is located within the Aramac Tramway Station. The Aramac Tramway was constructed in 1912–1913, funded by the Aramac Shire Council. It closed on 31 December 1975.

When Queensland separated from New South Wales in 1859, the new Queensland Government was quick to throw open land for grazing, and a great wave of pastoral settlement swept across western and northern Queensland in the early 1860s.

The establishment of towns in the west soon followed, for example Tambo, Blackall and Aramac which developed as commercial centres to service the pastoral industry. Aramac Town Reserve was gazetted on 26 June 1869 and the first businesses were established in the town that same year. On 6 April 1880, local government commenced when the Aramac Divisional Board, established under the Divisional Boards Act 1879, held its first meeting in the Court House.

Nineteenth century Queensland development was further influenced by the pattern of building railway lines west into the hinterlands from the major ports, first Main Line railway from near Brisbane in 1865, then the Central Western railway line from Rockhampton in 1867 and the Great Northern Railway from Townsville in 1880. The Central Western Line reached Barcaldine in 1886 and was extended to Longreach in 1892. These towns were founded when the railway arrived, and had the immediate effect of taking business away from the nearby well-established towns of Aramac and Blackall.

Throughout Australia, the early twentieth century heralded a time of rapid railway expansion, and competition between towns for services was fierce. Aramac had first asked for a railway extension in 1896, without success. Ten years later, in 1906, a deputation of Aramac Councillors visited the Premier, William Kidston, seeking his support for the railway. It also failed. Despite these disappointing responses, the Aramac Shire Council (the successor to the Aramac Divisional Board) persevered with their plans. In 1908 Council asked the Queensland Treasury for a special loan of £1,375 to finance a survey of the route of the proposed line. With some reservation from the Railways Department, the Council was granted its survey loan, and employed George Phillips to peg out the route from Aramac to Barcaldine. When the survey was completed, Council moved in March 1906 to borrow £66,500 to build the tramway. The Railways Department responded by commissioning two reports on the best commercial link between the Central Western and Great Northern lines. The second of these recommended the shortest and least expensive method of connecting the lines was by the Longreach to Winton route, and the Railways Commissioner decided in favour of this route.

Although it was to be another eighteen years before the Longreach-Winton line opened, the Aramac Shire Council committed itself to the courageous decision to construct a tramway for which the Council would be financially responsible. In March 1911, Treasury approval was given for a loan to Aramac Shire Council to build the Barcaldine-Aramac tramway. George Phillips was appointed Engineer in charge of construction.

In June 1911 Council fixed the station site "at the Eastern End of Gordon Street about 100 yards before the bore drain". That point was to become the end of the track, where the locomotive shed was built; the station building was actually built about 200 metres (660 ft) to the south, near the end of McWhannell Street.

Construction from the Central Western Line commenced at Lagoon Creek, 1 mile (1.6 km) west of the Barcaldine railway station, on 14 February 1912. The construction standard that Phillips adopted was the minimum acceptable to the Queensland Railways Commissioner; although the tramway belonged to the Council, it needed to conform to Queensland Railways specifications because government rolling stock would be using it. The line was to be 3 ft 6 in gauge, with very light 42-pound (19 kg) Moss Bay rails. For most of its length, the line had no ballast, with the sleepers simply laid on levelled earth. This was a technique Phillips had pioneered on the Croydon-Normanton railway (now the Gulflander), and while it was frowned on by most railway engineers, it was satisfactory under light loads on level going. As most of the route extended over open grassed plains, simply following the gentle rise and fall of the ground, there was very little earthwork to do. There were only about 12 bends on the line, one cutting and no embankments, and 24 wooden trestle bridges, most of them over small creeks. Because the route ran through grazing country, the whole line was stock-fenced.

Only 6 miles (9.7 km) of line had been laid by April 1912. Unusually heavy rain on the blacksoil plains held up progress, and the workers struck for higher pay. The late delivery of sleepers was a constant problem throughout the project. In August the line reached the halfway point, and on 12 September the 21 miles (34 km) of track to Mildura siding were officially opened to traffic. These delays meant that construction expenses had been heavier than Phillip's estimates, and in November the money ran out. Council was forced to go to the Queensland Treasury for another loan of £10,000 to complete the work. The total cost of the completed tramway was £88,983, one third more than Phillips' estimate.

By May 1913 the bridges over Aramac Creek were being built, and the tramway was approaching town. Final preparations were underway as the construction phase neared completion. The station buildings were being built by O'Brien and Company, and a contract was signed with Blair Athol Coal Company for the supply of coal. Phillips was to be kept on as Supervising Engineer after the line opened. The first locomotive to work the line was already in use during the construction work. It was an elderly Avonside Engine Company B12, built in 1877, which had spent many years in Queensland Railways service as Engine No 31 before being purchased by Aramac Shire Council to become Aramac Tramway Engine No 1.

The official opening of the tramway took place on 2 July 1913. It was expected that the work would be completed by then, but unseasonal rain had again delayed construction, so the line was still a few hundred metres short of its objective. As the date had been chosen to coincide with the festivities of the annual race meeting, the opening went ahead regardless. The ceremony was held at the end of the completed line, which at that time was between the two channels of Aramac. The Honourable Walter Paget, Minister for Railways, performed the opening.

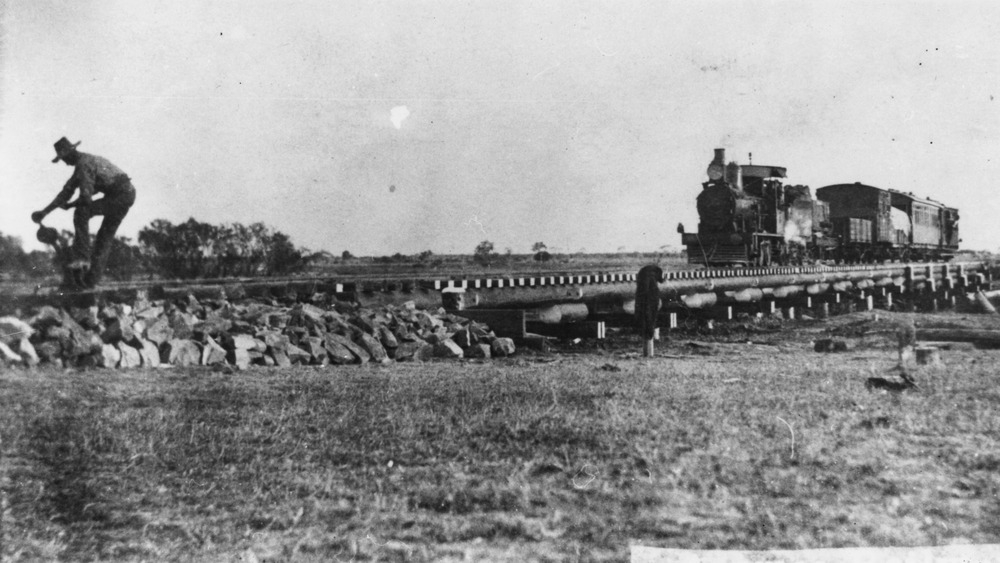
First train to cross the bridge into Armac, 1913

Despite the official opening, there were still two more months of construction work ahead. Building the 41-mile (66 km) line took 19 months in all, and it was not until September 1913 that the bridge over Aramac Creek was completed, and the first train steamed into Aramac Tramway Station.

The station at the Aramac terminus of the line was the place where passengers and goods from all over the district converged on departing trains, and dispersed from arriving ones. The activities at the tramway terminus were spread out over a distance of about 400 metres (1,300 ft) running up the eastern side of the town, with the three east–west streets of the town grid all terminating at the tramway yards.

Trains arriving in Aramac crossed the bridges over the creek channels and steamed up the grade into the station. The main line led directly into the passenger station, and the train stopped under a large timber-framed corrugated iron canopy covering the line, an unusual and prominent building. The station master's office, ticket office and waiting rooms were in the weatherboard station building alongside the canopy, and when a train was due a row of taxicabs stood waiting in the street outside. Ahead of the train, built over the end of the main line, was the locomotive shed, and near it were the coal stage and the station master's residence.

When passengers had alighted, the train was reversed onto a side line which led to the goods shed and the wool loading platform, back in the direction of Aramac Creek. Here goods and parcels were unloaded into the shed which still stands, and a row of trucks and wagons lined up on the other side of the concrete platform to collect merchandise for the town's businesses. The Aramac yard had four tracks for shunting, and a triangle running east from the main line for turning the locomotives. That line also led to the sheep and cattle loading ramps and yards, east of the station.

Immediately it opened, the tramway had a beneficial impact on the economy of Aramac. Wool, the staple product of the district, was carried to market faster and more efficiently. From places all over the shire, goods, passengers and business which had once gone by road to the government railway stations at Longreach, Barcaldine or Jericho now all converged on the town of Aramac. The whole town took on an air of bustle and excitement with the arrival of every train, and all its businesses benefited. The tramway offered four regular passenger services each week, with additional trains for goods and livestock as required. In 1915, the second full year of operation, the tramway carried over 4,000 long tons (4,100 t) of wool and 4,000 long tons (4,100 t) of general goods, over 250,000 sheep and nearly 7000 passengers.

The graziers and shopkeepers who made up the Aramac Shire Council found themselves in the unfamiliar business of running a railway, and it was to form a prominent part of their agenda for the next 62 years. The tramway was a financial success, but only marginally so; even in the busy year of 1915, total revenue was only 8% greater than expenditure. Running expenses had to be watched very closely, and many Council meetings became largely concerned with tramway management issues such as timetables, claims for delayed goods, locomotive maintenance, mail contracts and coal purchases.

Experience showed that the old Engine No 1 was not sufficiently powerful to operate the line, and in November 1914 Council resolved to call tenders for a second larger B15 steam locomotive. Engine No 113 was leased from Queensland Railways for a time, but proved unsatisfactory and was returned to State service. Then in late 1915 Council bought B15 class engine No 308 second-hand from the Railways Department for £2002. It had been built by Walkers Limited at Maryborough in 1897, and now became Aramac Engine No 2. The older engine remained in service for light work until it was scrapped in 1939. The engine shed was lengthened to take the second engine in 1915, and the bridges on the line were strengthened to take the extra weight.

In November 1915, Council passed the motion offering the tramway to the Queensland Government and that the Minister for Railways now be written to asking the Government to take it over as a government line. This may be the first indication that Council had doubts about the future viability of the tramway, or it may simply have been part of the plan from the beginning. There is no record that any reply was ever received from the Queensland Government.

The initial success of the tramway was not to last. Drought, industrial unrest, and the economic slowdown brought on by the departure of volunteers from throughout the district to the First World War all combined to reduce traffic on the tramway. Between 1914 and 1918 Council brought in severe cost-cutting measures. George Phillips was dismissed as engineer when it was believed the government would take over the line, and no other engineer was ever employed. Half the maintenance gang was laid off, and staff were withdrawn from the sidings along the line. In 1918 the station master's cottage at the Mildura siding was moved into Aramac and rented to the Aramac station master. Previously, employees had been paid the same rates as their Queensland Railways equivalents; now their wages were reduced by a third. Timetabled services were reduced to two a week, and freights and fares were raised.

The Council managed to keep the operations of the tramway running profitably during this time, but only at the twin costs of making the service less attractive to customers, and reducing maintenance on the line. After the first few years, the condition of the track began to suffer. Phillips' cheap construction methods had a serious downside, for the un-ballasted track was very difficult to maintain. It quickly deteriorated, giving passengers a rough ride, and leading to frequent derailments. The heavier B15 locomotive in use after 1915 exacerbated the problem.

The decision to dispense with engineering advice and reduce track maintenance to only the minimum level of necessary repairs was a critical moment in the Aramac tramway's history. While successfully cutting operating costs in the short term, it meant that the tramway would have to carry smaller loads at slower speeds, giving customers a declining level of service over the years. The progressively deteriorating track would eventually doom its operations altogether.

Business picked up in the post-war era, services were increased again, and the tramway held its own and continued to run at a small profit each year. The accumulated reserve was sufficient to encourage Council to seek a Treasury loan of £7,500 to buy a new locomotive in 1924. The new engine was a PB15 built in the Ipswich railway workshops, and the first locomotive to be purpose-built for the Aramac line, unlike the two second-hand government ones already in service.

Traffic declined as the 1920s advanced, and although the tramway continued to provide an economic benefit to the Aramac district, Council struggled to break even financially in most years. The service was never again as popular or as successful as it had been at the outset, and drought and rural depression continued to keep business down. There was increasing competition from road transport as private motor cars and trucks became cheaper and more popular in the 1920s. Operating perilously close to the edge of viability, the tramway faced a catastrophe in 1928 when cyclonic rains flooded the district. The damage to the line stopped all traffic for weeks, and the lost revenue combined with the cost of repairs sent the accounts for the year heavily into the red. Council had to levy a special rate to pay the tramway's expenses, and was unable to meet its loan repayments that year; there was no option but to go to State Treasury and negotiate a three-year suspension of payments.

The tramway's prosperous heyday was over, and it was to be many years before things improved. The deepening depression made the situation even worse, and saw staff retrenchments and the withdrawal of concession fares and freight rebates for primary producers. The onset of the Second World War brought further austerity; there were constant labour and material shortages, and it was difficult to buy coal. By 1944 the tramway was offering the bare minimum of service to customers, and Council had exhausted almost every trick it knew to keep it running. Scheduled services had again been cut back to twice weekly, and track maintenance was reduced to only the most urgent and necessary repairs. The two old engines had both been scrapped, and the only locomotive left in service was now 20 years old. Treasury had been waiving interest and loan repayment for years, and had written off a part of the debt; effectively the Queensland Government was subsidising the Aramac tramway because it was cheaper to do so than to provide an alternative service to the Aramac district at government expense.

The tramway station was the main focus of Aramac's economic and social life. It was an intimate enterprise in a small tight-knit community.

The layout of the Aramac station changed over time, brought about by changes in the operation of the line. The locomotive shed, for example, was built in 1913 to house one locomotive, then doubled in length in 1915 to house two. It was apparently not lengthened again after 1912; Engine No 1 sat outside for the remainder of its life. The shed was shortened again after 1943, when there was once more only one locomotive in service. Then in 1958 when the tramway went over to diesel power, the old shed was demolished and a new and even smaller shed was built to house the much shorter engine.

The other two major buildings - the station and goods shed - had no need for any such functional changes and remained virtually unaltered from 1913 onwards, the station until it was demolished in 1976, and the goods shed to the present day.

In the post-war era the Aramac tramway faced its greatest challenge ever as its principal competitor, road transport, became stronger and more popular. Since 1945 the face of Australian transport has been completely transformed by bigger trucks operating on improved roads. If the tramway had been faced with this challenge in its enfeebled condition of the 1930s, it would have been defeated very quickly.

There were two important changes ahead for the tramway. The first was brought about by a dramatic boom in the post-war rural economy, which saw the price of some agricultural products increase by as much as ten to twenty times between 1939 and the early 1950s. Small outback towns such as Aramac experienced a sudden return to a level of prosperity not seen for decades. Traffic on the tramway picked up steadily from 1945 onwards, and while there was still a large burden of debt to overcome before the Council could think about declaring a profit, operations by the early 1950s were again running at a more comfortable level.

The second change was a complete transformation of the tramway, by means of both long-overdue repairs to the track and the purchase of a new engine. Years of neglected maintenance had left the railway line in a deteriorated condition. In 1957 the Railways Department gave Council an ultimatum that unless the track was substantially upgraded, it would no longer permit government-owned rolling stock to be used on the Aramac run. The increased prosperity of the district enabled Council both to increase freight charges and levy ratepayers, raising £30,000 which was spent on the first major repairs to the line in many years, including rebuilding of the bridges.

There was also a major upgrading of the motive power driving the tramway. In 1957, Council ordered a 150-horsepower Comeng diesel-hydraulic locomotive to replace its 33 year old steam engine. It was cheaper to run and easier to maintain, and weighing only 16 long tons (16 t), it was much less subject to derailment and bogging. The old PB15 steam locomotive was sold to Queensland Government Railways, and the new diesel engine commenced service on 17 January 1958.

After fifty years of service with four locomotives, the tramway in 1963 finally hit upon the ideal vehicle for the line. To supplement the little diesel engine, Council bought a second-hand railmotor, RM 28, from the State service for £100. The railmotor remained in service for as long as the tramway operated. It was much lighter than a conventional locomotive, and its weight was spread more evenly over its length, so it performed much better on the rough track. Derailments became almost unknown, and in wet weather the locomotive sat in its shed while the railmotor was pressed into service.

Council bought still another new diesel locomotive in 1968. The 1958 locomotive was a little under-powered for heavy loads, and was supplemented by a slightly bigger 19 long tons (19 t) diesel-hydraulic locomotive built by Walkers Limited. For a time the two engines could be coupled together and operated as a single unit, but in January 1970 the Queensland Government bought the old diesel locomotive.

These developments and improvements of the 1950s and 1960s kept the tramway going into the post-war era, but they could not change the economic circumstances in which the service operated. Road transport was becoming faster and more efficient year by year, and the tramway simply could not compete. Passenger traffic dwindled to virtually nothing by the 1960s because nearly everyone travelled by car. Wool and livestock increasingly travelled by truck in dry weather. The tramway was only eking out an existence, and Council's aim was simply to keep the financial loss down as low as possible.

The losses remained acceptable until 1970, then there was a drop in income as competition from road transport really began to take hold. The condition of the track, reconditioned over ten years before, was again becoming a big problem, and there was industrial trouble with the workforce. The Queensland Government agreed to subsidise the tramway service until the road was sealed from Aramac to Barcaldine. A Tramways Undertaking Fund was established, and State Treasury began to pay the annual shortfall. While this arrangement was in force, the great floods of January 1974 caused major damage to the line, and the cost of repairs dramatically increased the debt.

The progressively increasing debt to the Queensland Government added to the money owed to Treasury over the entire life of the tramway, since the original loan of 1911. By 1975, the accumulated size of the government loan was $225,000, and there was no longer any prospect of reducing it. The road was already sealed about halfway from Barcaldine, and the likelihood was that traffic on the tramway would soon shrink to nothing. No longer an asset to the Shire's economy, the tramway had become simply a burden on the ratepayers. In November 1975, the Permanent Way Inspector gave a gloomy description of the state of the track. In the face of this report, Council decided to close the Tramway. It was decided that the service would terminate on 31 December 1975, and tenders would be called for the sale of 150 long tons (150 t) of steel rails and the diesel locomotive.

The tramway ran its last service at some time in the days just before New Year 1976. In February 1976, four tenders were received for the purchase of 82 miles (132 km) of steel rails and the eight year old locomotive. Council accepted the tender of £262,400 from the Australian Sugar Producers Association, and the tracks were torn up and trucked away over the next few months. The bitumen-sealed road arrived in Aramac a few months after the tramway closed.

The closure of the tramway left the Council's financial situation unresolved, for there was uncertainty about the status of the Tramways Undertaking Fund, and whether it had been composed of outright grants, or loans which had to be repaid. State Treasury took the view that the Aramac Shire should use the tramway sale money to repay the Queensland Government's contribution to the Fund. The State Treasurer wrote to the Aramac Shire Council accordingly; however politics were to intervene in the Council's favour when the State Treasurer, Sir Gordon Chalk, Leader of the Liberal Party in Queensland, retired from Parliament after 29 years in politics on 13 August 1976. Aramac Shire kept the surplus tramway money.

After the tramway closed, its few remaining assets were dispersed. The railway station building was in poor condition because of termite infestation, and was demolished in 1976. The goods shed remained standing, as did the cold store near the station, which remained in service as a Council facility. The railmotor and its carriages, two maintenance trolleys, and some other passenger carriages that the tramway had acquired over the years were placed in a steel mesh cage on a short length of the main line near the goods shed. Following the tramway's closure, the station building was demolished, while the goods shed and rolling stock were preserved. Community efforts led to the establishment of the Aramac Tramway Museum, which opened in 1994 and was incorporated in 1997. The museum continues to preserve the history of the tramway and associated local heritage.

The Tramway Museum has also become a focus for local historical activity generally, and in recent years people have donated a number of items which have been stored in and around the goods shed. There has also been a proposal put forward to reinstate a section of track to run the railmotor as a tourist attraction, and Queensland Rail has donated sleepers and rails for a kilometre of track.

== Description ==
The principal elements of the Tramway Museum are the goods shed, six other buildings, other structures and relics of the tramway, rolling stock, the local history collection housed in the goods shed, and machinery and vehicles in the open air.

=== Goods Shed ===
The most substantial relic of the tramway is the goods shed, built at the time the line opened in 1913, and used for the entire period it operated. The goods shed is rectangular in plan, about 30 metres (98 ft) long and 10 metres (33 ft) wide. It is timber-framed with a corrugated iron roof, and clad with chamferboards externally. The roof is unlined, and there is an air gap of about 20 centimetres (7.9 in) between the roof and the tops of the side walls. The interior walls have been lined with opened-out wool bales, displaying the station brands of the Aramac district that once travelled on the tramway. The interior of the building is quite dark, lit only by the doorway, some fluorescent lights on the overhead beams, and a small amount of light that comes in over the tops of the side walls. On the railway side of the goods shed, a concrete platform four metres wide runs the entire length of the building, and extends 10 metres (33 ft) further at the southern end.

The interior of the goods shed is dominated by the railmotor "Aunt Emma", which is positioned in a cage of steel pipe and wire mesh running down the central axis of the building. As the cage is about 3 metres (9.8 ft) wide and 24 metres (79 ft) long, it leaves little space inside the building. Around the railmotor cage is a corridor a little more than a metre wide, fenced on both sides. Historical material is displayed between the fenced corridor and the walls of the goods shed.

At the northern end of the goods shed, an area three metres wide running the width of the building has been set up as the Tramway Office, with a safe, desks and cupboards, some from the goods shed and some removed from the demolished railway station. Most of the collection in this area is directly relevant to the tramway: there are original tickets, waybills, reports. rubber stamps, and some important memorabilia preserved from the tramway closure, including a handwritten feltpen notice advising: "Due to the closure of this tramway all goods and parcels will have to be collected from goods shed, office and railway wagons before 4.00 pm Wednesday 31-12-75". On the wall is a photocopy of the cheque from the Australian Sugar Producers Association for £262 400, dated 10 June 1976. There are some historic photographs of the tramway on display, and two interpretation signs, one about the closure and one about "Aunt Emma". There are also rate assessment books and other Council documents on display in this area.

Housed along the walls on the other three sides of the goods shed is a general collection of historical material, very little of which is connected with the Aramac tramway. There are a wide range of household items, including clothing, chinaware, shaving gear, electrical appliances, musical instruments, typewriters, slide projectors, gramophones, sewing machines, trophies, and a large collection of glass bottles. There is a telephone exchange, workshop tools, stock bells, a wool press, a wheelchair, rocks pumps and watering cans. A number of books, photographs, medals and smaller items are housed in a glass case near the entrance. Several books are lying loose, some of general interest such as a home medical textbook, others of great relevance and value to the tramway such as an original manual for the railmotor's Gardner diesel engine.

=== Other buildings ===
There are six other buildings on the site, but not all are related to the tramway, and only two are buildings that existed on their present sites while the tramway was functioning. The locomotive shed at the very end of the line is the second or perhaps third shed in that position. This very small steel-framed corrugated iron clad building dates from the tramway's last years of operation, and was probably built in 1958 to house the first diesel locomotive. The doorway appears to have been rather crudely raised in height, suggesting that the second diesel engine may have been slightly higher.

The cold store is the only other surviving building of the tramway station complex. A small building clad partly in asbestos cement sheeting and partly in corrugated iron, it was built in the 1950s and stands near the southern end of the station platform. It is still in use as a Council-owned public facility for storing refrigerated goods.

Parallel to the goods shed on roughly the former alignment of the main line is an open shelter shed, consisting of a low-pitched gabled corrugated iron roof supported on tubular steel posts, enclosed with cyclone wire mesh. It houses a passenger carriage and two small motorised railcars.

Near the southern end of the shelter is a small toolshed or workshop, timber-framed and clad with corrugated iron, which houses a maintenance trolley, a blacksmith's forge and other tools. The trolley sits on a short section of track which runs at right angles to the main line.

Beside the shelter shed is a three-sided hut of corrugated iron on a bush timber frame, containing a wood stove and a bedframe.

At the northern end of the goods shed, and the first building encountered by visitors entering the museum, is a police lockup, measuring about seven metres by three metres in plan. It is built of timber, weatherboard clad, and consists of two cells side by side with a narrow verandah in front. It was brought to the site from the Aramac police station.

=== Structures and Relics of the Tramway ===
On the site of the demolished railway station, about 80 metres (260 ft) north of the goods shed, the concrete platform runs for about 45 metres (148 ft) alongside the alignment of the main line. The cold store stands near its southern end. At the northern end of the platform are a row of four lengths of steel rail put upright in the ground as posts. These marked the site of the taxi rank, and were to stop cars encroaching onto the pedestrian area of the passenger platform.

Further north along the main line, near the locomotive shed, are the concrete foundations of the diesel fuel tank. There is no sign of the coal bins or the station master's house.

The remains of the cattle yards are on a side line about 100 metres (330 ft) east of the station platform. There are modern yards on the site, but these are completely different in their layout from the tramway yards. A cattle dip was located to the south, of which a small section of the concrete floor and an intact drain remain. A few disturbed pieces of broken-up loading ramps are still on the site. Near the cattle yards there are some timber pieces of the railway station building lying loose, including the base of a 30 centimetres (12 in) diameter post set in concrete.

Thirty metres south of the goods shed and parallel with the goods line is the wool loading platform, a raised concrete-faced earth platform 45 metres (148 ft) long, nearly identical with the platform at the station building.

Midway between the goods shed and the wool platform is a steel gantry straddling the goods line.

Four hundred metres south of the goods shed, the main line crosses the two channels of Aramac Creek. There are two low bridges, each about 30 metres (98 ft) in length, built to a standard Queensland Railways trestle design. The rails have been removed, but the timber structure appears more or less intact, although not capable of supporting a load.

=== Rolling Stock ===
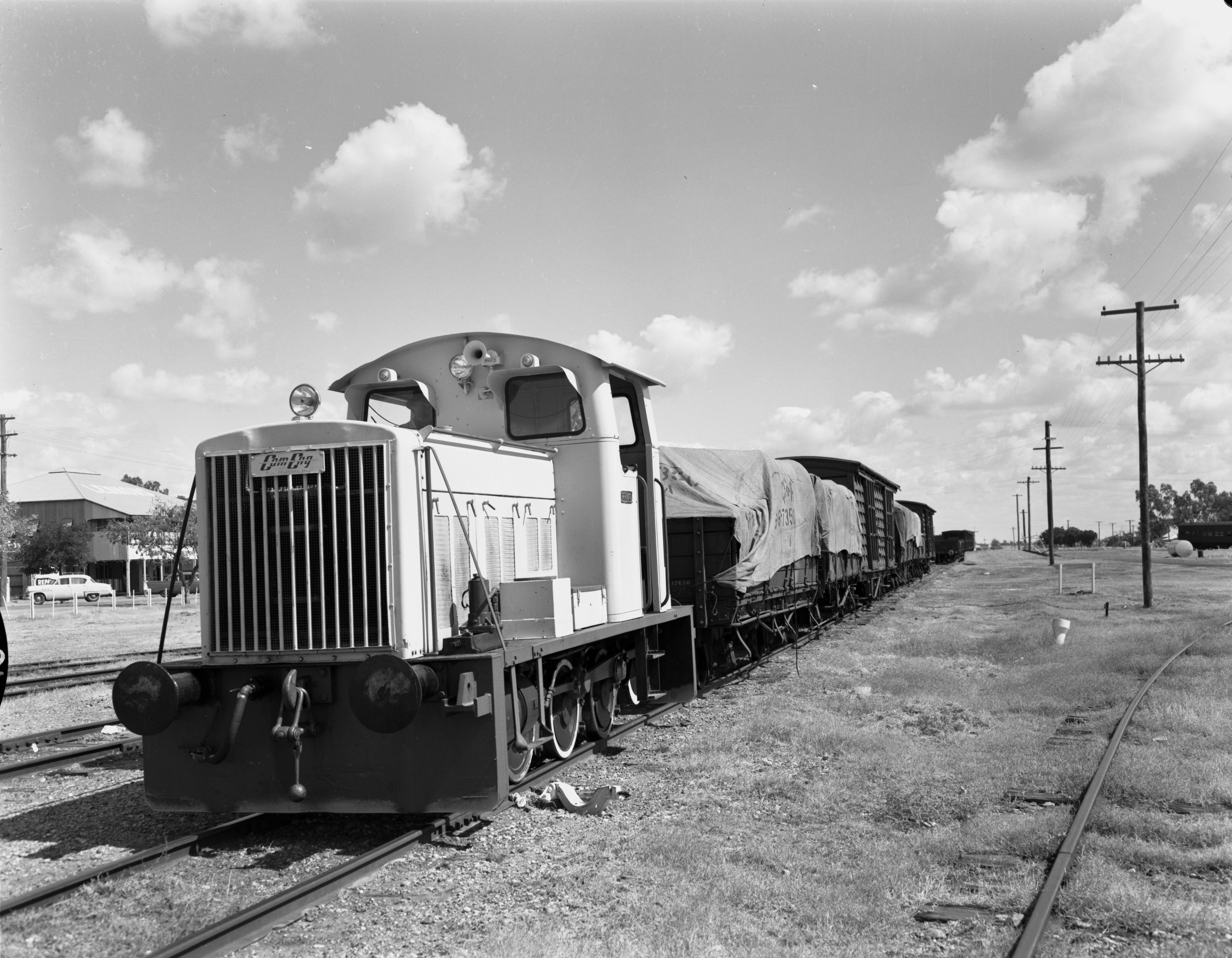
Aramac tramway station in Barcaldine, 1967

The Tramway Museum still has six intact rail vehicles on site, and the partial remains of two more. Pride of place in the collection is the railmotor "Aunt Emma". One passenger carriage is still attached to the engine carriage.

In the open shelter shed is a timber passenger carriage which was designed to be hauled by a steam locomotive. Most of the seats had been removed when fittings for a mobile fettler's camp were installed. Two refrigerators remain.

The Tramway Museum also has two Fairmont light motorised trolleys. One Fairmont is in the open shelter shed, the other in the enclosed toolshed.

Also in the open shelter shed is an even smaller motorised track inspection car, barely big enough for two people. It is enclosed with a glass windscreen, and is equipped with a stretcher to act as an ambulance in emergencies.

Abandoned near the end of the main line outside the locomotive shed are the remains of Engine No 1 and its tender. The tender is reasonably intact, although missing its wheels and bogies, but the locomotive consists of simply the chassis and boiler mounts, with the boiler, cylinders and driving mechanism, wheels, bogies and cabin all missing.

== Heritage listing ==
Aramac Tramway Museum was listed on the Queensland Heritage Register on 26 November 1999 having satisfied the following criteria.

The Aramac Tramway Museum is important in demonstrating the pattern of Queensland's history, forming part of a tramway built during the rapid expansion of railways in Queensland in the late nineteenth and early twentieth centuries. The Aramac Tramway was funded by the local council as a branch line of the Winton - Longreach line, and remained under the control of the Aramac Shire Council for the entire period of its operation. It was the last of such locally controlled tramways operating when it closed in 1975.

Aramac Tramway Museum demonstrates a rare and unusual aspect of Queensland's cultural heritage as an example of a railway service operated by a local community.

The place has a special association with the Aramac community through their efforts to have the tramway constructed and maintained over a 62-year period. For many years the tramway provided an important economic and social link to Barcaldine and the Central Line running to Rockhampton. In times of flood, the road between Aramac and Barcaldine would be closed and the tramway provided the sole transport link between the towns.

== See also ==
- Aramac Tramway
- List of tramways in Queensland
