= Aramac War Memorial =

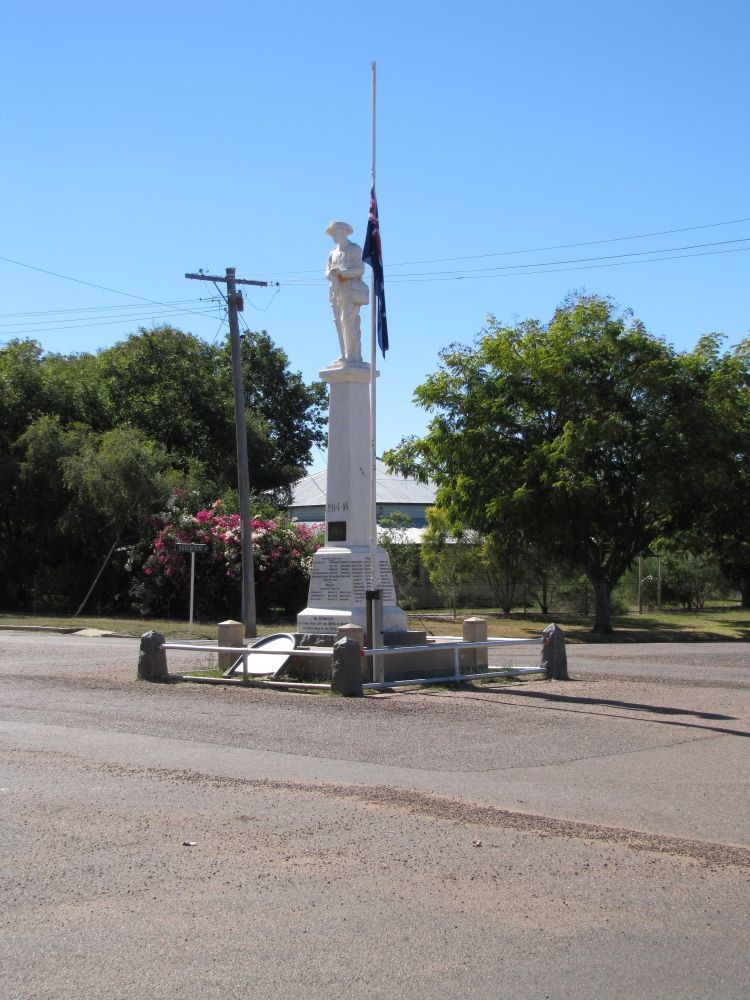
- Aramac War Memorial from south-west, 2011

- Location within Queensland
- 22.9719°S 145.2451°E
- Location: Lodge Street, Aramac, Barcaldine Region, Queensland, Australia

History
- Design period: 1919 - 1930s (interwar period)
- Built: 1924

Site notes
- Architect: F M Allan

Queensland Heritage Register
- Official name: Aramac War Memorial
- Type: state heritage (built)
- Designated: 21 October 1992
- Reference no.: 600008
- Significant period: 1924-
- Significant components: flagpole/flagstaff, memorial - obelisk, memorial surrounds/railings, memorial - soldier statue, views to
- Builders: F M Allan

Aramac War Memorial is a heritage-listed memorial at Lodge Street, Aramac, Barcaldine Region, Queensland, Australia. It was designed and built by F M Allan in 1924. It was added to the Queensland Heritage Register on 21 October 1992.

== History ==
The Aramac War Memorial was unveiled on 12 April 1924 by Aramac Shire Chairman, E W Bowyer in lieu of the Queensland Governor who was unable to attend. It was designed and executed by monumental masonry firm, F M Allan and cost £700 in total; £580 for the monument and £48 for the fence. Funds were raised by the Memorial Committee, a group of mostly young women who held entertainments and collected public subscriptions. The stone memorial honours the 132 local men who served in the First World War, including fifteen dead and eleven wounded.

The memorial serviced the whole of the Aramac Shire and is located in the main intersection of the town of Aramac. It is of a comparatively large scale and dominates the small town.

The area of Aramac was first settled in the late 1850s after the area was discovered by European explorers Nathaniel Buchanan and William Landsborough. The town reserve was gazetted on 26 June 1869. Settlement was slow and sheep and cattle stations difficult to establish due to the remoteness of the area and the lack of water. By the late 1870s most land settlement had taken place.

Australia, and Queensland in particular, had few civic monuments before the First World War. The memorials erected in its wake became our first national monuments, recording the devastating impact of the war on a young nation. Australia lost 60,000 from a population of about 4 million, representing one in five of those who served. No previous or subsequent war has made such an impact on the nation.

Even before the end of the war, memorials became a spontaneous and highly visible expression of national grief. To those who erected them, they were as sacred as grave sites, substitute graves for the Australians whose bodies lay in battlefield cemeteries in Europe and the Middle East. British policy decreed that the Empire war dead were to be buried where they fell. The word "cenotaph", commonly applied to war memorials at the time, literally means "empty tomb".

Australian war memorials are distinctive in that they commemorate not only the dead. Australians were proud that their first great national army, unlike other belligerent armies, was composed entirely of volunteers, men worthy of honour whether or not they paid the supreme sacrifice. Many memorials honour all who served from a locality, not just the dead, providing valuable evidence of community involvement in the war. Such evidence is not readily obtainable from military records, or from state or national listings, where names are categorised alphabetically or by military unit.

Australian war memorials are also valuable evidence of imperial and national loyalties, at the time, not seen as conflicting; the skills of local stonemasons, metalworkers and architects; and of popular taste. In Queensland, the soldier statue was the popular choice of memorial, whereas the obelisk predominated in the southern states, possibly a reflection of Queensland's larger working-class population and a lesser involvement of architects.

Many of the First World War monuments have been updated to record local involvement in later conflicts, and some have fallen victim to unsympathetic re-location and repair.

Although there are many different types of memorials in Queensland, the digger (soldier) statue is the most common. It was the most popular choice of communities responsible for erecting the memorials, embodying the ANZAC spirit and representing the qualities of the ideal Australian: loyalty, courage, youth, innocence and masculinity. The digger was a phenomenon peculiar to Queensland, perhaps due to the fact that other states had followed Britain's lead and established Advisory Boards made up of architects and artists, prior to the erection of war memorials. The digger statue was not highly regarded by artists and architects who were involved in the design of relatively few Queensland memorials.

Most statues were constructed by local masonry firms, although some were by artists or imported.

The maker of the Aramac War Memorial, F M Allan was located in Rockhampton and was responsible for many war memorials in Central Queensland. This memorial and the one at Bundaberg are the two most intact digger memorials still remaining in their original settings at intersections.

== Description ==
The First World War Memorial dominates the main intersection of Aramac. It is surrounded by sandstone kerbing and corner posts and then by another enclosure comprising granite corner posts linked by double metal rails. A metal flagstaff is located at the south-west corner of the enclosure.

The granite and Ulam marble memorial comprises an obelisk surmounted by a digger statue. It sits on a square base of rock-faced grey granite, slightly higher than the surrounding sandstone wall.

The remainder of the monument is of Queensland Ulam marble. The obelisk sits on a slightly larger base comprising a single smooth-faced step with an angled top surmounted by a larger tapered smooth-faced block with cyma recta moulding to the top. The step has a leaded inscription on the front face and the larger block bears the leaded names of the 132 men who served in the First World War, including the 15 dead and 11 wounded, whose names are recorded on the front face.

Rising from the base is the obelisk, slightly tapering towards a plain cornice. On the lower front face is a leaded AIF badge and the dates of the First World War.

Surmounting the obelisk is the digger statue, which is life-sized. The soldier stands with his head bowed. His hands are crossed on top of a reversed rifle which rests on his left boot. A tree stump is located behind and to the side of the right leg for support.

== Heritage listing ==
Aramac War Memorial was listed on the Queensland Heritage Register on 21 October 1992 having satisfied the following criteria.

The place is important in demonstrating the evolution or pattern of Queensland's history.

War Memorials are important in demonstrating the pattern of Queensland's history as they are representative of a recurrent theme that involved most communities throughout the state. They provide evidence of an era of widespread Australian patriotism and nationalism, particularly during and following the First World War. The monuments manifest a unique documentary record and are demonstrative of popular taste in the inter-war period.

The place is important in demonstrating the principal characteristics of a particular class of cultural places.

Erected in 1924, the memorial at Aramac demonstrates the principal characteristics of a commemorative structure erected as an enduring record of a major historical event. This is achieved through the use of appropriate materials and design elements. As a digger statue it is representative of the most popular form of memorial in Queensland.

The place is important because of its aesthetic significance.

This memorial is of particular significance as it is extravagant in scale and design in comparison to the size of the town. It is a dominant landmark in the area and is an uncommon example of a memorial still situated in its original and intact setting.

The place has a strong or special association with a particular community or cultural group for social, cultural or spiritual reasons.

The memorial has a strong association with the community as evidence of the impact of a major historic event and also with Rockhampton masonry firm, F M Allan as an example of their work.

The place has a special association with the life or work of a particular person, group or organisation of importance in Queensland's history.

The memorial has a strong association with the community as evidence of the impact of a major historic event and also with Rockhampton masonry firm, F M Allan as an example of their work.
