= Aramac Airport =

- IATA: AXC; ICAO: YAMC

Summary
- Airport type: Public
- Operator: Barcaldine Regional Council
- Location: Aramac, Queensland, Australia
- Elevation AMSL: 760 ft / 232 m
- Coordinates: 22°57′28.4″S 145°14′58.6″E

Map
- Location in Queensland

Runways
Direction	Length		Surface
Direction	m	ft	Surface
11/29	914	2,999	Bitumen
- Sources: AIP

Aramac Airport (IATA: AXC, ICAO: YAMC) is an unlicensed airport located 1 km (0.62 mi) from the town of Aramac in remote Central Queensland. The airport is used by suppliers bringing goods into the town and is also used by the locals to fly to major towns or cities in their own planes or by booking a private plane.

If required planes from nearby Longreach or Muttaburra can be booked to land and pick up any passengers.

== See also ==
- List of airports in Queensland
