= Iningai =

Aboriginal Australian people

The Iningai (Yiningayi) are an indigenous Australian people of the present-day Longreach Region in the state of Queensland.

== Country ==
The traditional lands of the Iningai lay to the west of the Great Dividing Range as far as the Forsyth Range, Maneroo Creek, and Longreach. Norman Tindale estimated their territory as encompassing an area close to 19,500 sq. miles. Their southern frontier lay along the tributaries of the Alice River down to the vicinity of Mexico. Their northern limits were at Muttaburra, Cornish Creek, Tower Hill, Bowen Downs, and North Oakvale. They were also present at Aramac.

Muttaburra derives its name from one of the Iningai clan names.

== Social organization ==
The Iningai were composed of several band society hordes, some of whose names survive:

- Muttaburra
- Tateburra (north of Cornish Creek)
- Terreburra (Alice River)

== Alternative names ==
The Iningai were known by several names, some of which were used to refer to both the whole group and clans within. Alternate names include:

- Muttaburra
- Mutabura, Moothaburra, Mootaburra
- Tateburra
- Terreburra
- Kana

== Sources ==
- "AIATSIS map of Indigenous Australia". Canberra: AIATSIS. 14 May 2024.
