= Alice River (Barcoo River tributary) =

River in Queensland, Australia

Coordinates: 23°23′S 145°08′E

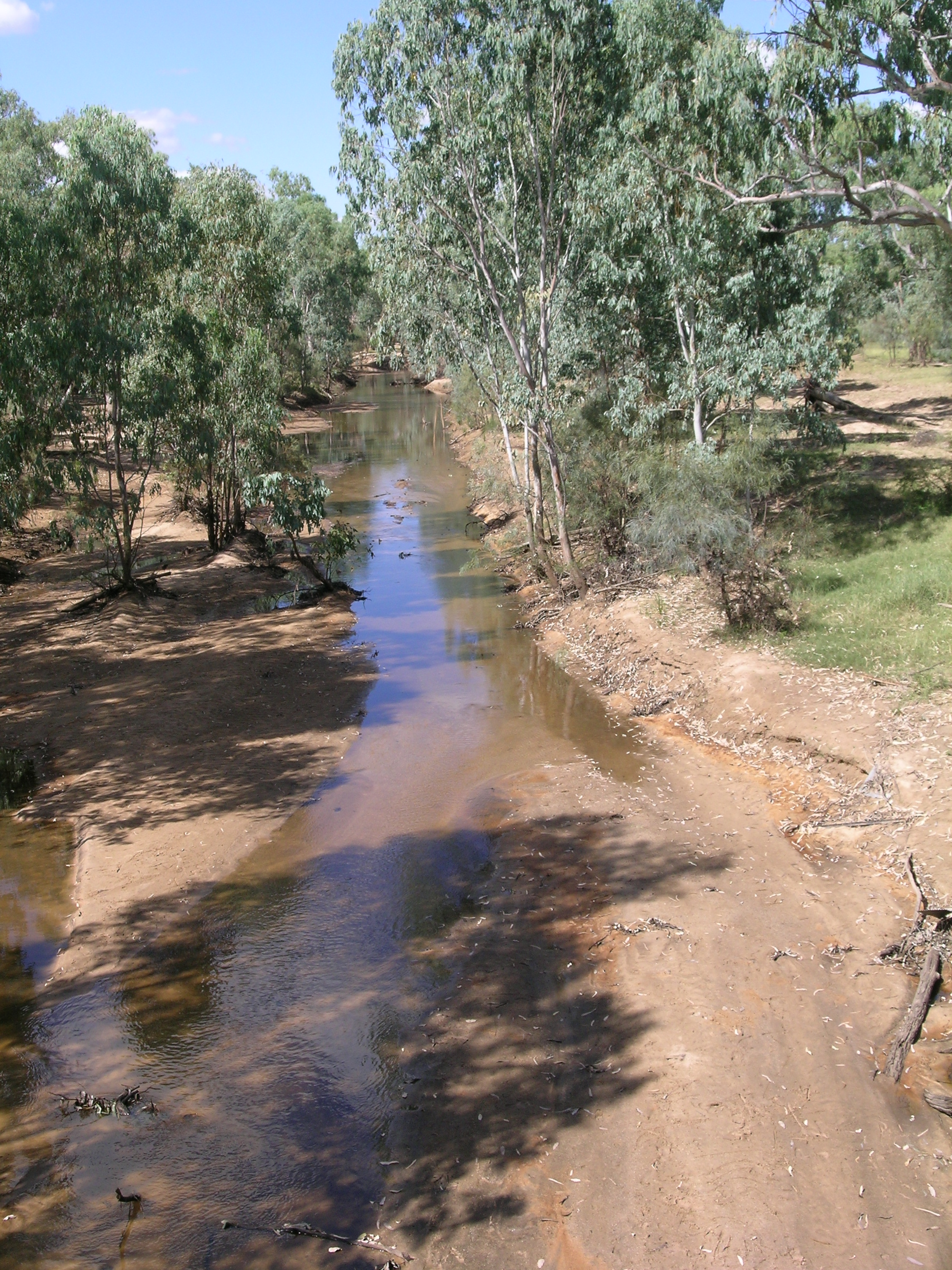
- Alice River, near the Landsborough Highway

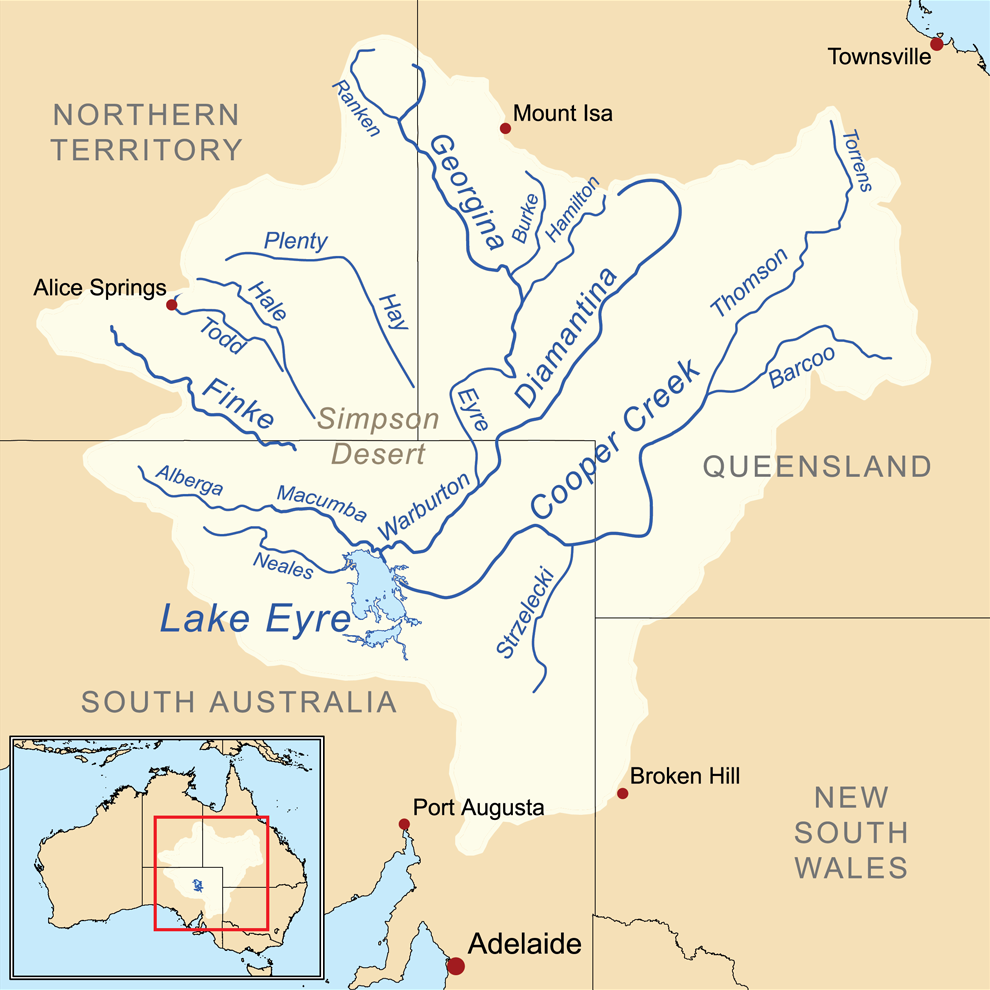
- Map of the Lake Eyre Basin showing Barcoo River

Location
- Country: Australia
- State: Queensland

Physical characteristics
- Source: Great Dividing Range
  - location: east of Aramac, Central Queensland
- Mouth: confluence with the Barcoo River
  - location: north-east of Isisford
  - elevation: 225 m (738 ft)
- Length: 303 km (188 mi)

Basin features
- River system: Barcoo River, Lake Eyre basin

The Alice River in central Queensland, Australia rises on the western slopes of the Great Dividing Range. The river bisects the Shire of Barcaldine, flowing in a south-westerly direction towards Isisford and its confluence with the Barcoo River. The town of Barcaldine is located on the Alice River. The Alice River's tributaries include Jordan Creek and Lagoon Creek. The Alice River is often dry, except after the annual summer rains.

The Barcoo River forms the boundary of outback Australia with little in the way of civilisation west of the Barcoo. Waters from the Barcoo and Alice Rivers flow towards Lake Eyre in Central Australia, while rivers further east join the Murray-Darling basin and reach the sea in South Australia.

== History ==
The traditional owners of the area are the Iningai people. Iningai (also known as Yiningay, Muttaburra, Tateburra, Yinangay, Yinangi) is an Australian Aboriginal language spoken by the Iningai people. The Iningai language region includes the landscape within the local government boundaries of the Longreach Region and Barcaldine Region, particularly the towns of Longreach, Barcaldine, Muttaburra and Aramac as well as the properties of Bowen Downs and catchments of Cornish Creek and Alice River.

In 1846, Thomas Mitchell became the first European to see the Barcoo and Alice Rivers. The Alice River was named by Mitchell and Mitchell's name was adopted for the pastoral district and for its grass, Mitchell grass. In October 1863, Donald Cameron, his son John, together with James and William Crombie walked sheep from the New England district of New South Wales and grazed them along a 40-mile frontage of the Alice River. They named their property Barcaldine after a family farm in Scotland.

In 1891 the Alice River had a record flood that stopped traffic for a week. On 20 March 1910 the Alice River flooded all the low-lying country and the railway line was blocked.

== See also ==
- Alice River, Queensland
- List of rivers of Australia
