= Aramac Station =

Pastoral lease in Queensland

Coordinates: 22°58′06″S 145°14′42″E

Location in Queensland

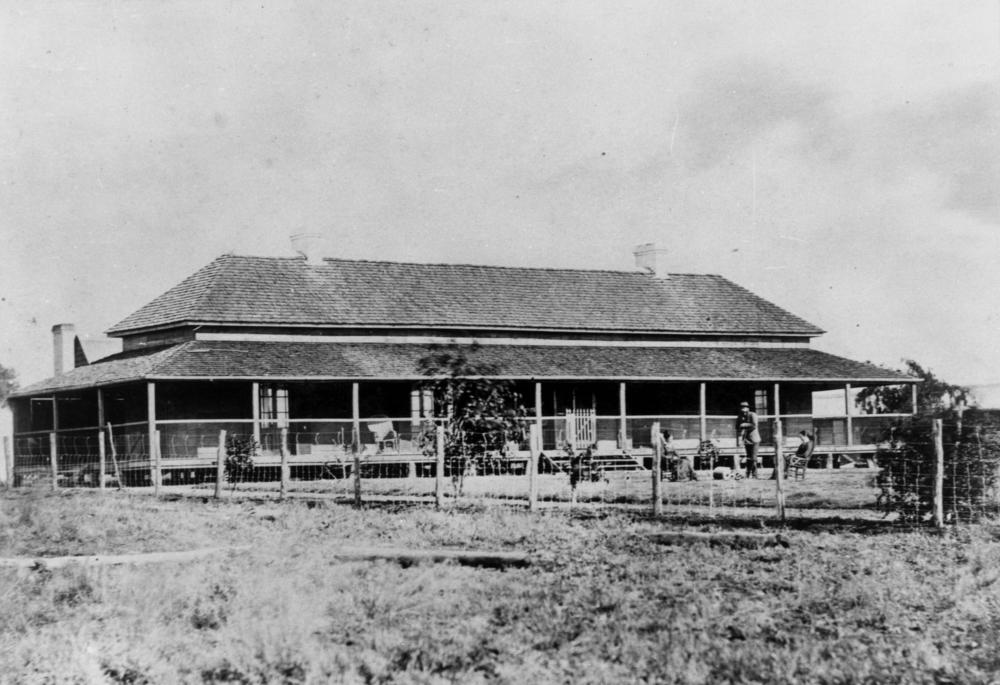
Aramac Station homestead 1877

Aramac Station was a pastoral lease that has operated both as a cattle station and a sheep station. It is located about 83 kilometres (52 mi) south east of Muttaburra and 162 kilometres (101 mi) north west of Alpha near the town of Aramac in Queensland.

The district was first explored by William Landsborough in 1859 who named the Aramac Creek, a tributary of the Thomson River, after a former pastoralist, Robert Ramsay MacKenzie. The station, in turn, takes its name from the creek.

The station was established in 1863, shortly after Bowen Downs Station in 1862. Aramac Station was initially settled by John Rule and Dyson Lacey along the banks of the creek, and they stocked the area with sheep. The early part of the year and several waterholes failed causing other pastoralists in the area to move on. When the rains came in June the creek flooded and the homestead was found to be too close to the creek and had to be moved to higher ground. Lacey was later speared along with another of the station shepherds by Aboriginal men.

The first manager of the station was Alexander "Long" Gordon, who worked for Rule and Lacey. During his time there, he shot a large number of Aboriginal people near Greyrock in the nearby Mailman's Gorge, although another account blames the massacre on a tribal war between Aboriginal people.

Originally occupying an area of approximately 850 square miles (544,000 acres), the station is made up of about two thirds open and grazing country and about one third described as desert country.

In 1867 an employee of Aramac, John Kingston, started a trading post at an outlying point of the creek that later became the town of Aramac.

Rule left Aramac in 1871,

An Aboriginal shepherd murdered a European man at Aramac in 1872.

Roderick Travers had bought Aramac off Rule and Lacey some time prior to 1873 and added it to his other holding of Malvern Downs which combined held some 60,000 sheep and 10,000 cattle.

3,000 sheep from the station were sold off in 1873 and taken to Mr McCormack's Peak Downs Station.

By 1875 the station was owned by Messrs Travers and Gibson, who had a flock of approximately 20,000 sheep on the run. By this stage they also had about 200,000 acres (80,937 ha) fenced suitable for both cattle and sheep. This in turn reduced the number of dog attacks on the flock.

An additional 15,000 sheep were delivered to the station from Malvern Downs in 1876, along with 15 stud bulls that arrived later in the dry season.

Several bushfires broke out in December 1876 resulting in the death of a man named Robert Durban and a Kanaka labourer who were carting water to men who were beating out the flames when he got burnt. Two horses and a dray were also lost during the fire. The men were volunteers from town who had come to help the Forsyths, of Aramac Station, to quell the blaze. The Forsyths later established a fund to help Durban's widow.

Messrs. Anderson and Nicoll of Manuka Station purchased 10,000 sheep from Aramac that were droved overland and delivered in 1879 with the stock "looking remarkably well".

In 1880 Travers and Gibson bought 5636 ewes from Huntly Station for Aramac. Another 5,000 were sent to Aramac from Spottiswoode Station in 1881.

Sometime prior to 1890 the station fell into the hands of the Bank of New South Wales and was managed by William Forsyth but was later purchased in 1891 for £100,000 by James Tolson, who also owned the neighbouring properties of Corinda and Uanda Station. In 1900 the station had a flock of 150,000 sheep and was still owned by Tolson.

The station was subdivided and put up for ballot in 1930 attracting 396 applicants from all over Australia. The property was split into seven different blocks ranging from 18,215 acres (7,371 ha) to 40,964 acres (16,578 ha). The land was described as "not being in first class order" after being heavily stocked for many years.

All the station plant, homestead and stock were sold off in 1930. Many of the selectors were among those who purchased the equipment. Some of the new newly formed properties were named Politic, Powella, Edgebaston and Stainburn.

== See also ==
- List of ranches and stations
