= Aramac, Queensland =

Aramac
- Town
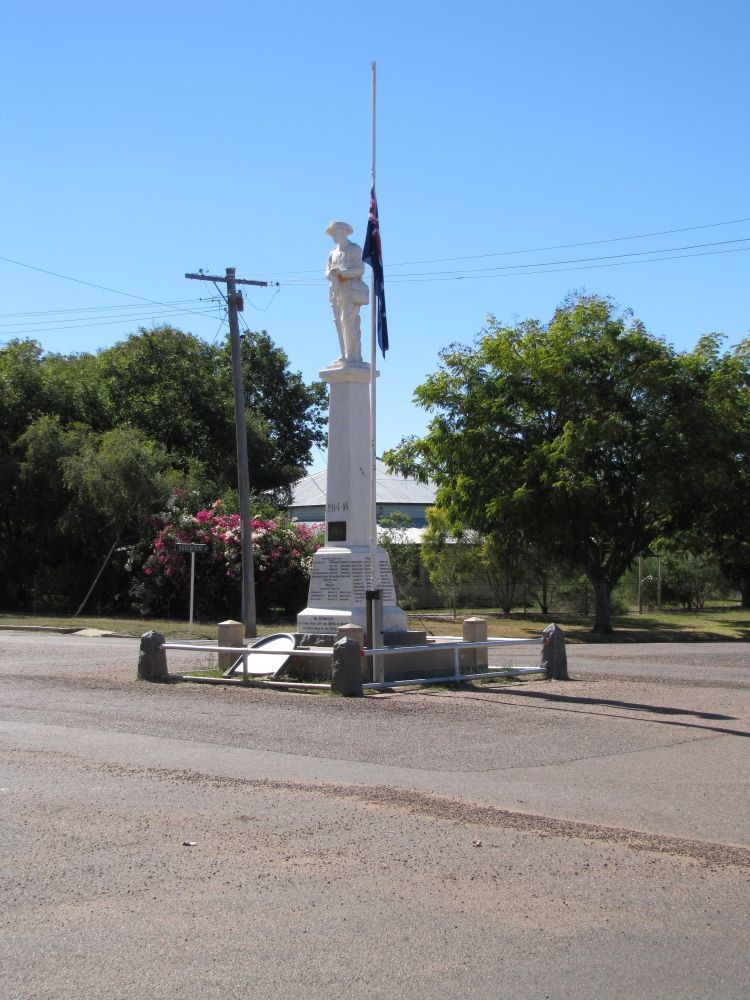
- Aramac War Memorial, 2011

- Interactive map of Aramac
- Coordinates: 22.9719°S 145.2430°E
- Country: Australia
- State: Queensland
- LGA: Barcaldine Region
- Location: 67.3 km (41.8 mi) N of Barcaldine; 127 km (79 mi) NE of Longreach; 646 km (401 mi) W of Rockhampton; 1,138 km (707 mi) NW of Brisbane
- Established: 1869

Government
  - State electorate: Gregory
  - Federal division: Maranoa

Area
  - Total: 38.7 km^{2} (14.9 sq mi)

Population
  - Total: 372 (2021 census)
  - Density: 9.612/km^{2} (24.90/sq mi)
- Time zone: UTC+10:00 (AEST)
- Postcode: 4726
Localities around Aramac
Prairie	Torrens Creek	Pentland
Muttaburra	Aramac	Laglan
Ilfracombe	Barcaldine	Jericho

Aramac /ˈærəmæk/ is a rural town and locality in the Barcaldine Region, Queensland, Australia. In the 2021 census, the locality of Aramac had a population of 372 people.

== Geography ==
Aramac is located 68 kilometres (42 mi) north of Barcaldine, and 1,280 kilometres (800 mi) by road from the state capital, Brisbane. It is situated on Aramac Creek, which flows into the Thomson River 60 kilometres (37 mi) west of town. The Muttaburra–Aramac Road enters from the north and exits as Barcaldine–Aramac Road to the south.

The predominant industry is grazing. The town water for Aramac is supplied from two bores connecting into the Great Artesian Basin.

== History ==
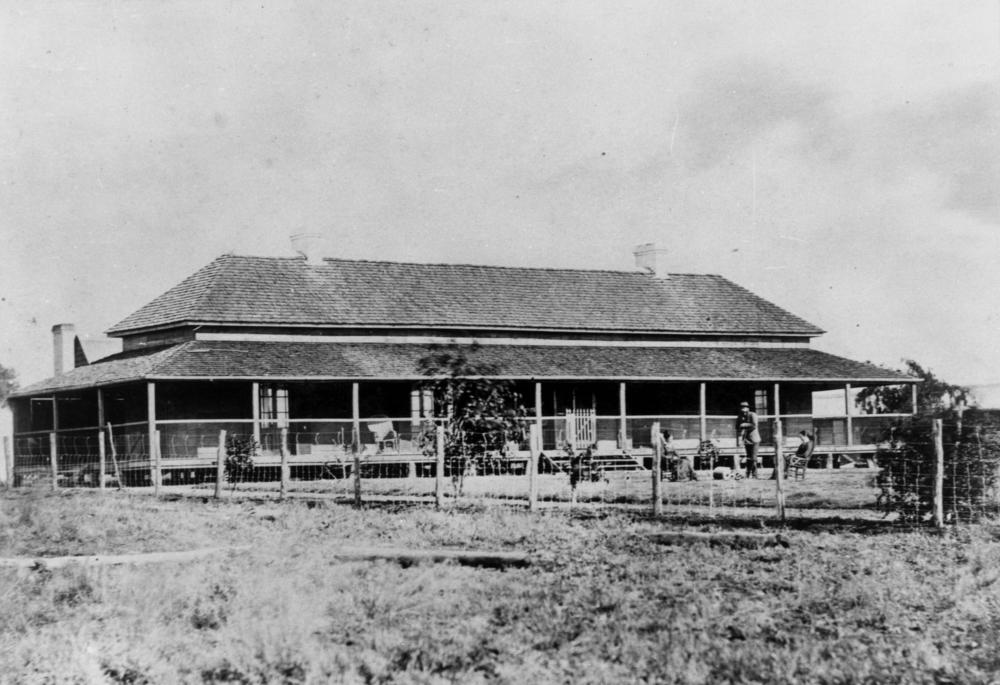
Aramac station ca. 1877

Aramac lay on the traditional tribal lands of the Iningai. Iningai (also known as Yiningay, Muttaburra, Tateburra, Yinangay, Yinangi) is an Australian Aboriginal language spoken by the Iningai people. The Iningai language region includes the landscape within the local government boundaries of the Longreach Region and Barcaldine Region, particularly the towns of Longreach, Barcaldine, Muttaburra and Aramac as well as the properties of Bowen Downs and catchments of Cornish Creek and Alice River.

In 1860, pastoralists and explorers, William Landsborough and Nathaniel Buchanan, travelled through the region looking for land to acquire. They came across a creek surrounded by good grazing country and Landsborough named it Aramac (derived from R.R. Mac) in honour of the future Premier of Queensland, Robert Ramsey Mackenzie.

British pastoral occupation began in the region in 1862 with the formation of the massive Bowen Downs station. Aramac Station was established by John Rule and Dyson Lacey in 1863.

In 1867, an employee of Aramac Station, John William Kingston, opened a bark-hut store at an outlying point on the Aramac Creek. Enlarged two years later to include a hotel (Kingston's Bazaar), Kingston's settlement was declared a town site in 1869 and surveyed as a town in 1875. It was the region's first town, and the centre of the first local-government division. To this day John William Kingston is recognised as the original founder of Aramac. His grave bears a plaque in the Aramac Cemetery acknowledging his achievement.

The town was originally called Marathon. The name was changed to that of Aramac, after the station, when the survey was conducted in 1875. Recollections of an 1878 visit to Aramac were published in the Rockhampton Morning Bulletin in 1933, describing the township as consisting of "neat weatherboard structures, painted, and comprising four stores, three hotels, and three butchers' shops, with a post office, bank, court house, and surgery", and the surrounding countryside and as "one of the emporia of the West."

"The place is known to so many by name only that the visitor feels himself travelled. Moreover, he has become, acquainted, however slightly, with the great western country, of which we have all heard so much. "He has been on its threshold, having traversed the desert, and beheld, not without surprise, broad rolling downs stretching away to the horizon, with an open landscape, sparsely mottled with trees, the whole presenting a vivid contrast to the dense scrub and scanty herbage of some of the more easterly districts. He has, in a word, seen an oasis in the 'Sahara' -one which, to him, has a beginning, but is boundless on the western side. Besides this, if the visit has been made during Show week, he has come more, fully to appreciate the great pastoral interest, as represented in the persons of men of intelligence and energy -the pioneers of colonisation, the promoters of commerce."

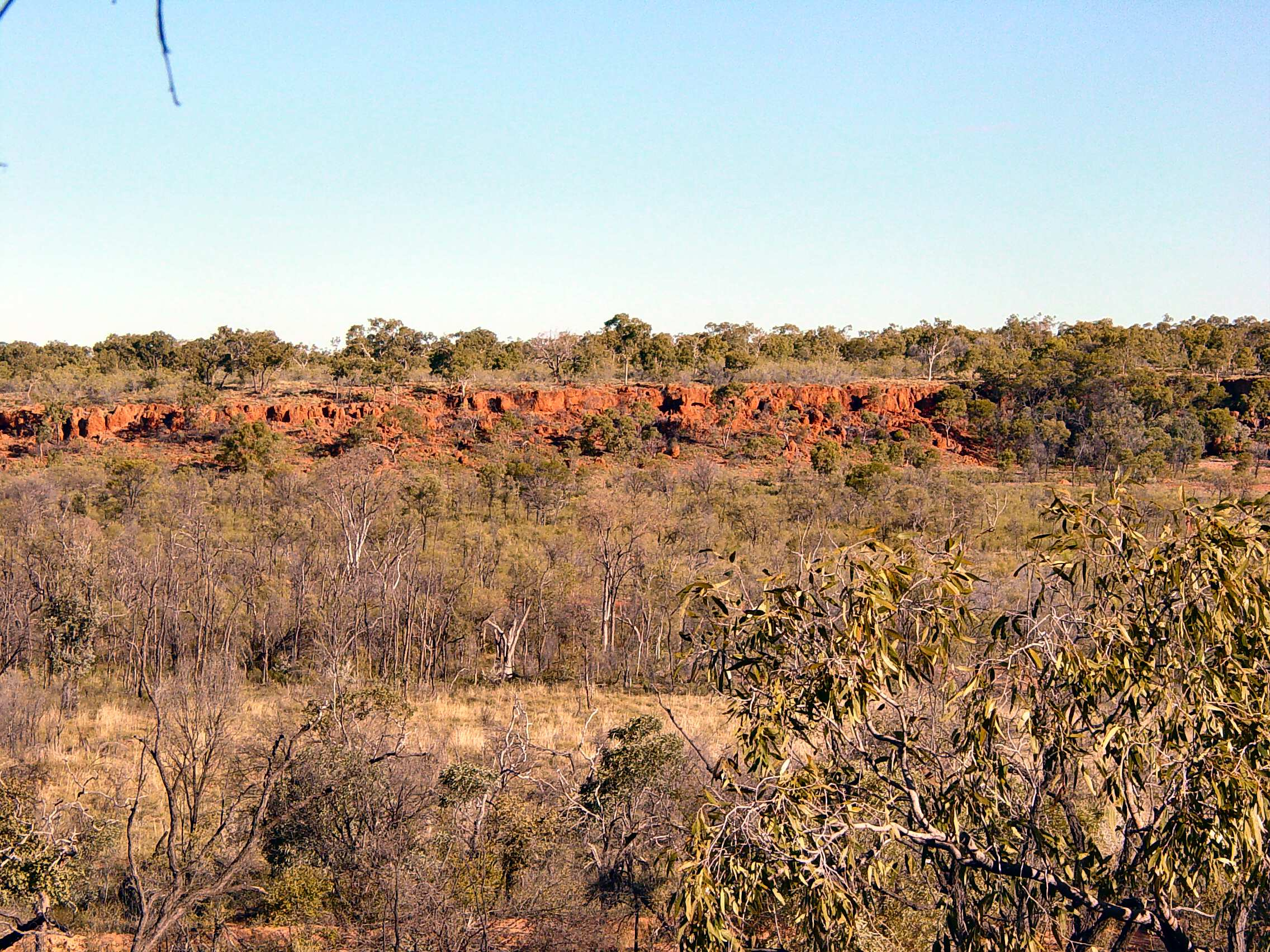
Mailman's Gorge massacre site, near Aramac

Little is known about the original indigenous population, although there was a reported massacre of 25 local Aborigines at the nearby Mailman's Gorge. This event remained largely unknown until the publication of North Queensland Pioneers in 1932. The author stated:

"The indigenous people were very numerous in the ranges around Aramac in the early days and the murder of a travelling jeweller and his wife and child caused reprisals. Harried by the police, the offending tribe took refuge in the country of a hostile tribe, and this precipitated wholesale tribal warfare. To this day it is said the mountain caves yield skeletons, the result of this tribal war."

An 1865 account said the death of a shepherd or a government employee at Stainburn Downs station, north-west of Aramac, led to a revenge attack by squatters. Three Europeans are supposed to have tracked 30 Aborigines to a cave at Mailman's Gorge and shot them.

Another account states that after the body of the station-worker was found, Alexander "Long" Gordon (after whom the main street of Aramac is named) tracked "the blacks" out to a cave near Greyrock at Mailman's Gorge where he shot every one of them dead.

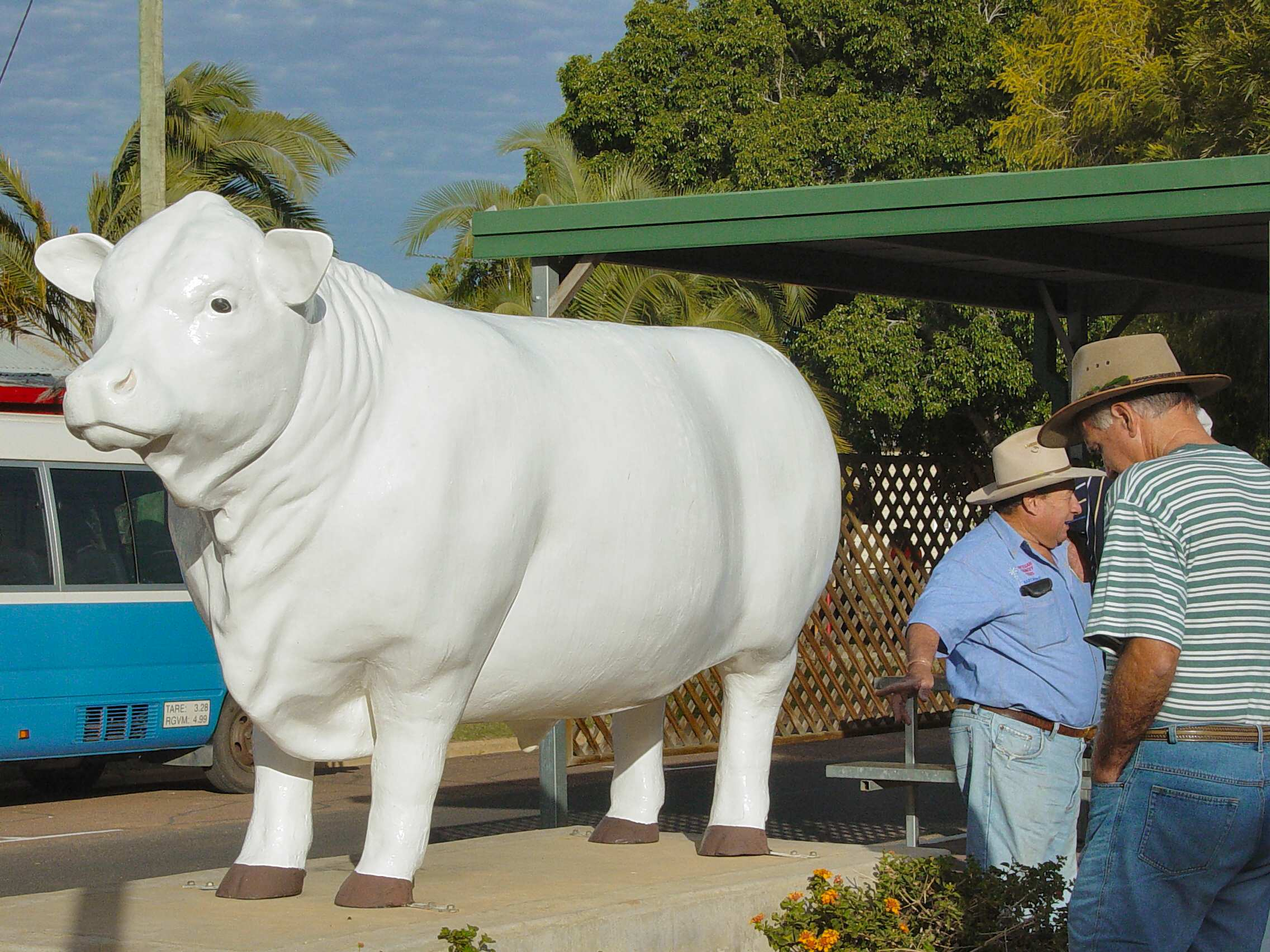
White Bull statue, commemorating Harry Redford's cattle duffing

In 1870, Henry 'Harry' Redford duffed cattle from a property called Bowen Downs. He amassed a herd of about 1,000 cattle. Knowing that the Bowen Downs cattle brand would be recognised locally, Redford knew he could not sell them locally, so decided to drive the cattle overland to South Australia. This was a remarkable achievement of droving, but unfortunately for Redford, his herd included a prize white bull which was sufficiently unusual that it was recognised and Redford and his conspirators were arrested. Redford is believed to be the inspiration for the fictional bushranger Captain Starlight in the novel Robbery Under Arms.

Aramac Post Office opened on 1 March 1874.

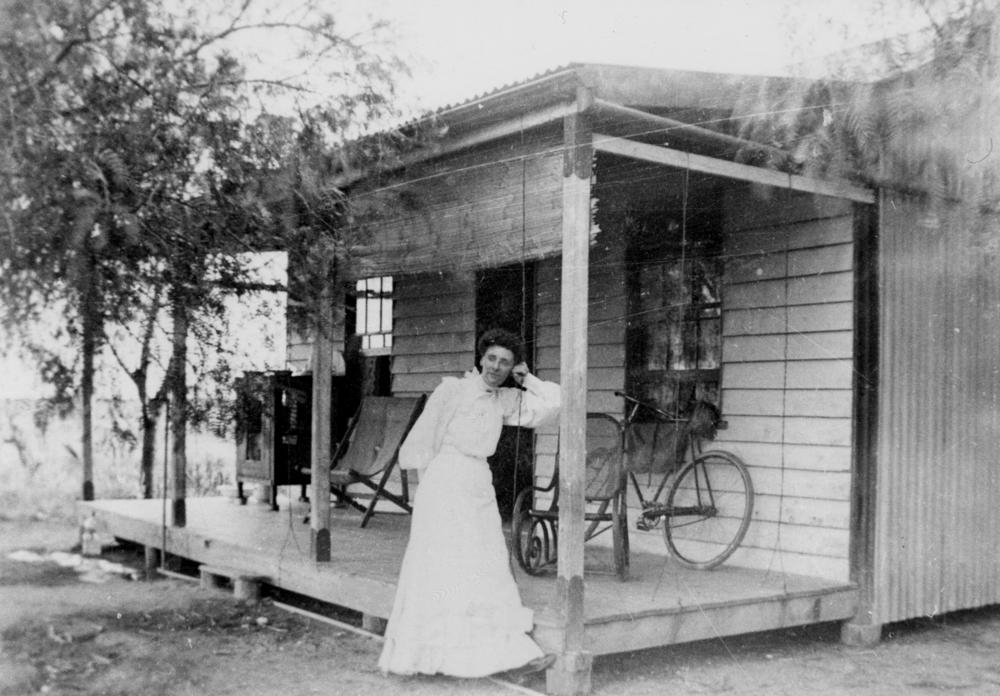
Aramac teacher stands outside her residence, circa 1914

Aramac State School opened on 21 January 1878. By 1901 the school was well established and received a very positive report from the School Inspector, Mr. Benbow, printed in The Western Champion.

"The discipline is kind, quietly firm, and sensible; the moral tone appears to be healthy; the school habits are very satisfactory; general behaviour is respectful and attentive; the class movements are quietly and effectively carried out, and very good order is maintained. Methods: The methods employed in teaching are generally intelligent and skillful; they are applied with skill and considerable energy; the amount of revision is sufficient. Progress: The progress made by the pupils may be regarded as good and sound. General condition: Everything considered the general condition of the school is highly satisfactory. Remarks: The two highest classes have been carefully and intelligently instructed, and the pupils of these classes have evidently been taught to think. The demeanor of the children during inspection was most pleasing."

The hospital opened in 1879. Circa 1888-1889 an Anglican church opened in Aramac.

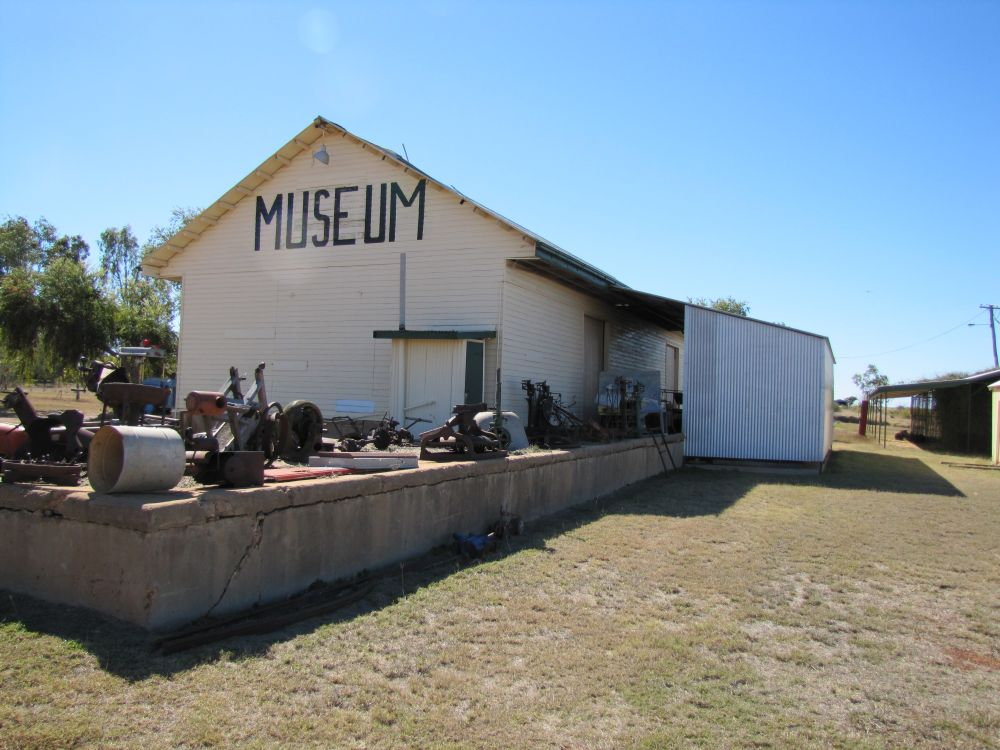
Aramac Tramway Museum (2011)

Aramac was initially a major outback town. However, when the Central Western railway line reached Barcaldine to the south in 1886, it drew trade away from Aramac. The residents agitated to get a railway connection to Aramac, but the Queensland Government was not willing. Having surveyed a route, in 1906, the Aramac Shire Council tried to borrow money from the Queensland Government to build their own railway. At that time, the Queensland Government was interested in creating a western connection between the Central Western railway line and the Great Northern railway and making that connection via Aramac was one possibility, but the government decided instead to build the connection between Longreach and Winton. Eventually the council borrowed the funding to build the Aramac Tramway connecting to the Western Central Line at Lagoon Creek, 1 mile (1.6 km) west of the Barcaldine railway station. The tramway opened on 2 July 1913 and operated until 31 December 1975. A tramway museum opened in 1994 in the old goods sheds.

St John's Catholic Church was opened circa 23 May 1901 by Bishop Joseph Higgins. In 1952, the old church was demolished to enable the construction of a new church, with services being held temporarily in the presbytery. On Sunday 14 December 1952, the new St John's Catholic Church was officially opened by Bishop Andrew Tynan.

In 1914, Aramac developed thermal baths with its artesian water to promote itself as a health resort; however, it did not attract many invalids due to its isolated geographic location and the failure of the local government to promote the baths.

The Aramac War Memorial was officially unveiled in April 1924, at a well attended public ceremony. The Last Post was played by Mr Affoo, and the children were all given a bag of lollies at the end of the ceremony. Shire Chairman, E.W. Bowyer presided and, as the Governor was unable to attend, gave the following speech:

"This memorial was erected by the people of the Aramac Shire, as a modest tribute to the patriotism and loyalty of the men who enlisted to take part in the late deplorable European War. It will serve as an ineffaceable record to remind not only the rising generation but succeeding generations that Australians fought, bled, and died in the defence of their country."

In June 1924, a branch of the Country Women's Association was formed in Aramac, and by August that year were active, their efforts much appreciated in the town, and reported in the Western Champion: "Something new in entertainments was provided on Friday evening at the Shire Bail, when the Aramac branch of the Country Women's Association arranged a Euchre and Ping Pong tournament for us, with dance thrown in."

On 22 November 2019, the Queensland Government decided to amalgamate the localities in the Barcaldine Region, resulting in five expanded localities based on the larger towns: Alpha, Aramac, Barcaldine, Jericho and Muttaburra. Aramac was expanded to incorporate Cornish Creek (eastern part), Dunrobin (south-western corner), Galilee, Garfield (western corner), Ibis, Ingberry (northern part), Pelican Creek, Sardine (eastern part), Upland, and Upper Cornish Creek.

== Demographics ==
In the 2006 census, the town of Aramac had a population of 341 people.

In the 2011 census, the locality of Aramac had a population of 299 people.

In the 2016 census, the locality of Aramac had a population of 299 people.

In the 2021 census, the locality of Aramac had a population of 372 people.

== Heritage listings ==
Aramac has a number of heritage-listed sites, including:

- Aramac Tramway Museum, Boundary Street
- Aramac War Memorial, Lodge Street
- Aramac State School, 69 Porter Street

== Education ==
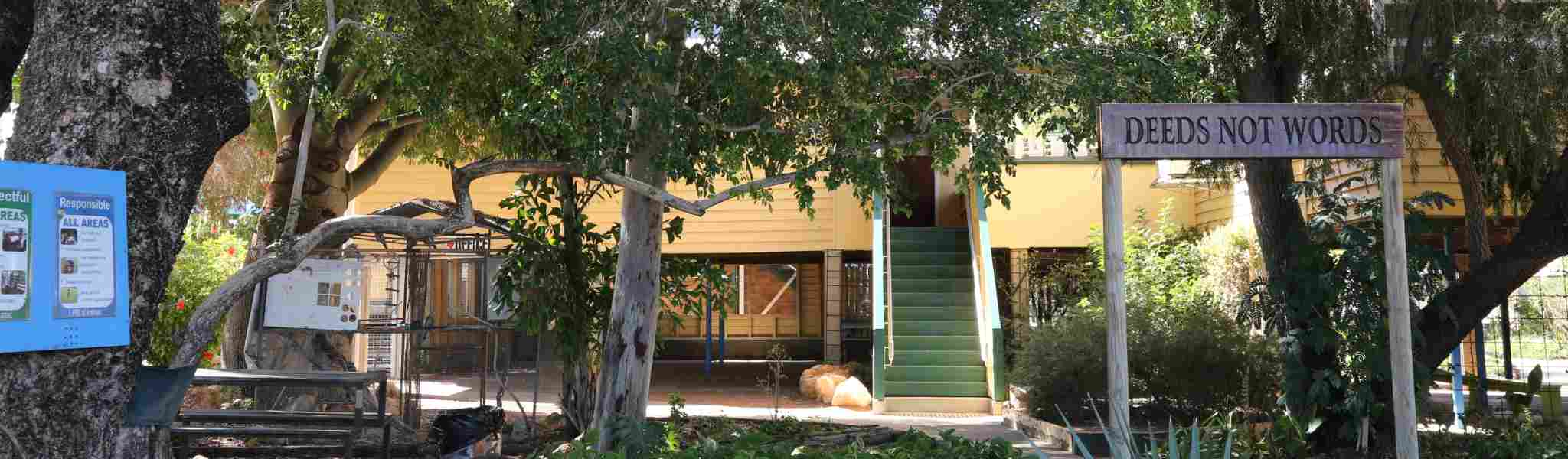
Aramac State School, 2019

Aramac State School is a government primary and secondary (Early Childhood-10) school for boys and girls at 69 Porter Street (22.9744°S 145.2426°E). In 2017, the school had an enrolment of 56 students with 10 teachers (9 full-time equivalent) and 10 non-teaching staff (6 full-time equivalent). In 2018, the school had an enrolment of 55 students with 10 teachers (9 full-time equivalent) and 12 non-teaching staff (6 full-time equivalent).

The closest secondary school for students in Years 11 and 12 is Barcaldine State School, 67 km (42 mi) to the south in Barcaldine.

== Facilities ==
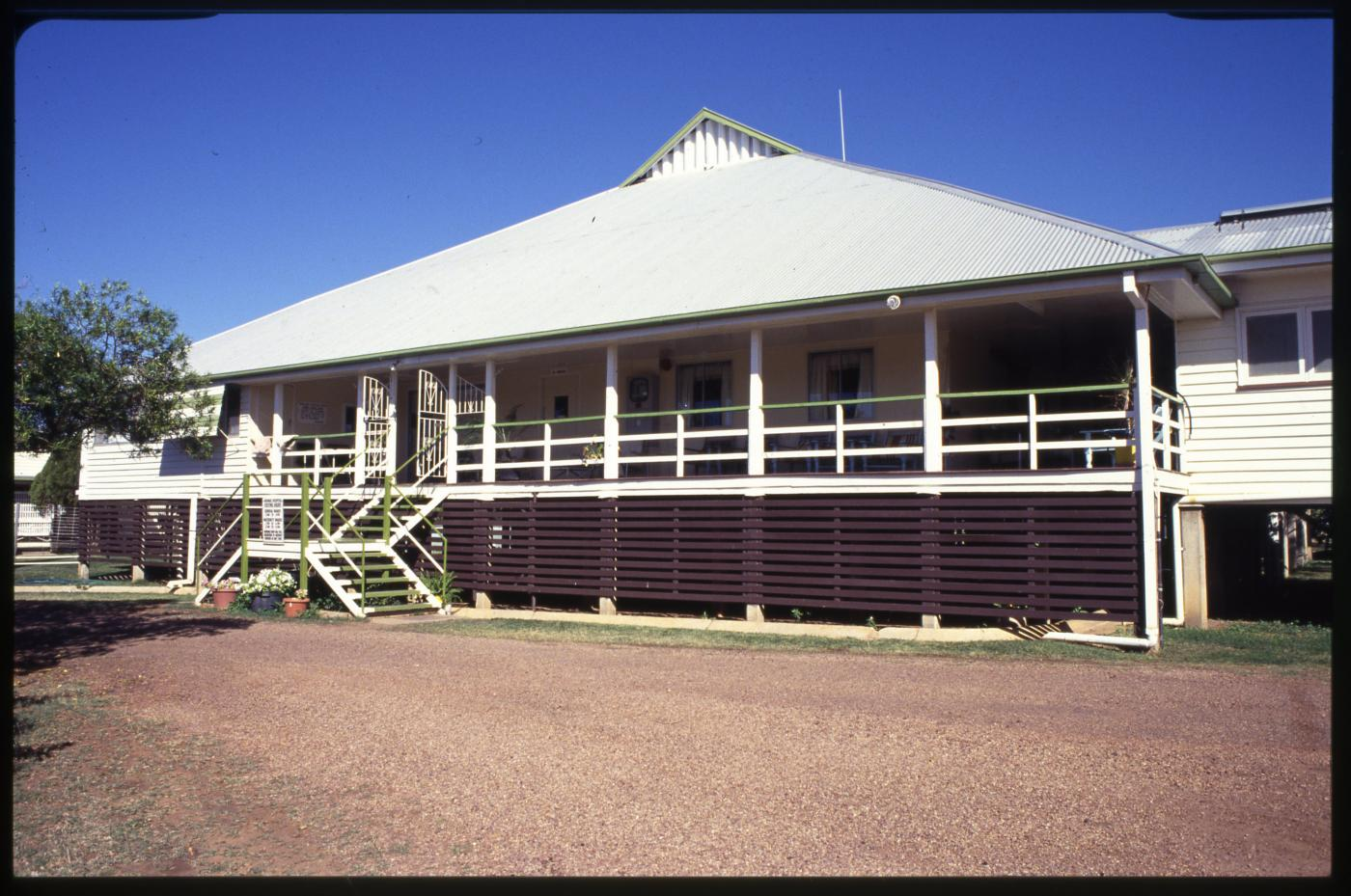
Old Aramac Hospital, built 1910s

Aramac has a visitor information centre, swimming pool located within the grounds of the Aramac Memorial Park in Gordon Street, a town hall, showground and a pub. There is no hospital, but nurse-led clinic facilities (Monday to Friday), ambulance services and 24-hours a day, seven days a week emergency on-call services. In 2016 the community had access to two doctors, with one staying overnight for two full days each week. The town is also serviced by the Royal Flying Doctor Service.

Barcaldine Regional Council operates the Ollie Landers Community Library at 68 Gordon Street.

== Events ==
The annual Harry Redford Cattle Drive begins in Aramac and partly traces the 1870 footsteps of renowned cattle duffer Harry Redford who walked 1,000 head of cattle from Bowen Downs, north of Aramac, to South Australia. In 2015 and 2016 the drive was cancelled due to prolonged drought in the region.

== Nearby cattle and sheep stations ==
- Aramac Station
- Bowen Downs Station
- Gracevale Station is about 52 km (32 mi) west of Aramac, about an hour by road and occupying about 9,000 hectares (22,000 acres). It was returned to the traditional owners, the Iningai people, in 2019, and will be renamed Turraburra. Much work on restoring the land and waterways has been done, and as of 2020 it is being opened to visitors. Cliffs on the property are covered with ancient rock art, including paintings and etchings of megafauna, emu symbols and the traditional songline of the Seven Sisters. Planning for an educational centre created from local rock is under way.

== See also ==
- Aramac Airport
- Aramac Station
- Lake Galilee (Queensland)
- List of tramways in Queensland
