= Hughenden–Muttaburra–Aramac–Barcaldine Road =

Road route in Queensland, Australia

Hughenden–Muttaburra–Aramac–Barcaldine Road Hughenden–Muttaburra Road, Muttaburra–Aramac Road, Barcaldine–Aramac Road Queensland

General information
- Type: Rural road
- Length: 359 km (223 mi)
- Route number(s): Entire route

Major junctions
- North end: Flinders Highway, Hughenden
- Prairie Road; Cramsie–Muttaburra Road; Crossmoor Road; Aramac–Torrens Creek Road; Ilfracombe–Aramac Road
- South end: Capricorn Highway, Barcaldine

Location(s)
- Major settlements: Muttaburra, Aramac

Hughenden–Muttaburra–Aramac–Barcaldine Road is a continuous 359-kilometre (223 mi) road route in the Flinders and Barcaldine local government areas of Queensland, Australia. It is designated as State Route 19. It has three official names, Hughenden–Muttaburra Road (number 5701), Muttaburra–Aramac Road (number 572), and Barcaldine–Aramac Road (number 573). Each component is a state-controlled district road, rated as a local road of regional significance (LRRS).

== Route description ==
The road commences as Hughenden–Muttaburra Road at an intersection with the Flinders Highway in the southern part of Hughenden. It proceeds south through Tangorin before entering the locality of Muttaburra Here it runs through the former locality of Tablederry, passing the exit to Prairie Road to the north-east, and the Geographical Centre of Queensland to the west.

Before reaching the town of Muttaburra the road passes the exit to Cramsie–Muttaburra Road to the west, and takes the name of that road from there to the town. It enters the town from the north and exits to the east, having changed its name to Muttaburra–Aramac Road. In the town it passes the Muttaburrasaurus Interpretation Centre to the south. After leaving the town the road turns south-east, passes the exit to Crossmoor Road to the south, and runs through the former locality of Sardine, where it passes the exit to Aramac–Torrens Creek Road to the north.

In Aramac the road turns south as Barcaldine–Aramac Road. It passes the exit to Ilfracombe–Aramac Road to the south-west, and continues south through the former localities of Ibis and Ingberry. Reaching Barcaldine it ends at an intersection with the Capricorn Highway.

=== Upgrade of Barcaldine–Aramac Road ===
A project to rehabilitate and widen more than 26 kilometres (16 mi) of Barcaldine–Aramac Road, at a cost of $21.842 million, was expected to be completed by mid-2023.

== Other roads ==
The following state-controlled district roads, each rated as a local road of regional significance (LRRS), intersect with the Hughenden–Muttaburra–Aramac–Barcaldine Road:

- Aramac–Torrens Creek Road (number 5703)
- Cramsie–Muttaburra Road (number 5705)
- Ilfracombe–Aramac Road (number 5732)

=== Aramac–Torrens Creek Road ===
Aramac–Torrens Creek Road
- Location: Muttaburra–Aramac Road, Aramac to Flinders Highway, Torrens Creek
- Length: 247 km (153 mi)
- Route number: 18

This road starts at an intersection with the Muttaburra–Aramac Road in Aramac. It runs north as State Route 18 for 247 kilometres (153 mi) to Torrens Creek, where it ends at an intersection with the Flinders Highway.

==== Upgrade of Aramac–Torrens Creek Road ====
A project to upgrade and seal more than 27 kilometres (17 mi) of this road, at a cost of $30.8 million, was completed in December 2022.

=== Cramsie–Muttaburra Road ===
Cramsie–Muttaburra Road
- Location: Landsborough Highway, Longreach to Hughenden–Muttaburra Road, Muttaburra
- Length: 113 km (70 mi)

This road starts at an intersection with the Landsborough Highway in Longreach, in an area known as Cramsie. It runs north-east for 113 kilometres (70 mi) to an intersection with the Hughenden–Muttaburra Road, about 1 kilometre (0.62 mi) north of the town of Muttaburra. It runs concurrent with that road to the town.

==== Upgrade of Cramsie–Muttaburra Road ====
A project to pave and seal the last 17 kilometres (11 mi) of the Cramsie–Muttaburra Road, at a cost of $9.54 million, was completed in December 2022.

=== Ilfracombe–Aramac Road ===
Ilfracombe–Aramac Road
- Location: Landsborough Highway, Ilfracombe to Barcaldine–Aramac Road, Aramac
- Length: 97.7 km (60.7 mi)

This road starts at an intersection with the Landsborough Highway in Ilfracombe. It runs north-east for 97.7 kilometres (60.7 mi) to an intersection with the Barcaldine–Aramac Road in Aramac, where it ends.

== History ==
Hughenden pastoral run was established in 1863. By 1864 several other runs had been taken up in the district. A township was started in 1866, and the town was surveyed in 1877. In 1887 the railway arrived and the town became a Municipality. With the arrival of the railway the town became the hub for a large number of carriers, transporting goods, mail, and passengers to outlying areas. One such run was that established between Hughenden and Muttaburra. It took two days each way, with passengers accommodated at a hotel in Tangorin overnight.

European settlement occurred in the Aramac district from 1862, and the township of Muttaburra was proclaimed in 1878. The site for the town of Aramac was declared in 1869 and surveyed in 1875.

Barcaldine Downs pastoral run was established in 1863. It was partly resumed for closer settlement in the 1880s. The town was established in 1885 and surveyed in 1886. The railway also arrived in 1886.

== Major intersections ==
All distances are from Google Maps.

| LGA | Location | km | mi | Destinations | Notes |
|---|---|---|---|---|---|
| Flinders | Hughenden | 0 | 0.0 | Flinders Highway – north – Hughenden – east – Prairie, Torrens Creek | Northern end of Hughenden–Muttaburra–Aramac–Barcaldine Road (State Route 19). Road continues south as Hughenden–Muttaburra Road. |
| Barcaldine | Muttaburra | 170 | 110 | Prairie Road – northeast – Prairie | Road continues south. |
| Barcaldine | Muttaburra | 205 | 127 | Cramsie–Muttaburra Road – west – Camoola, Longreach | Road continues south as Cramsie–Muttaburra Road. |
| Barcaldine | Muttaburra | 207– 208 | 129– 129 | In the town the road name changes to Bruford Street, then Bridge Street, then Muttaburra–Aramac Road. | Road continues east, then south-east. |
| Barcaldine | Muttaburra | 215 | 134 | Crossmoor Road – south – Crossmoor Station and Longreach. | Road continues south-east. |
| Barcaldine | Aramac | 270 | 170 | Aramac-Torrens Creek Road – north – Torrens Creek | Road continues south-east. |
| Barcaldine | Aramac | 291– 294 | 181– 183 | In the town the road name changes to Booker Street, then Lodge Street, then Drury Street, then Barcaldine–Aramac Road. | Road continues south. |
| Barcaldine | Aramac | 295 | 183 | Ilfracombe–Aramac Road – southwest – Ilfracombe | Road continues south. |
| Barcaldine | Barcaldine | 359 | 223 | Capricorn Highway – east – Grant, Jericho – west – Barcaldine, Ilfracombe | Southern end of Hughenden–Muttaburra–Aramac–Barcaldine Road (State Route 19). |
1.000 mi = 1.609 km; 1.000 km = 0.621 mi: Route transition

== See also ==
- List of road routes in Queensland
- List of numbered roads in Queensland
