= Shire of Aramac =

- Local government area
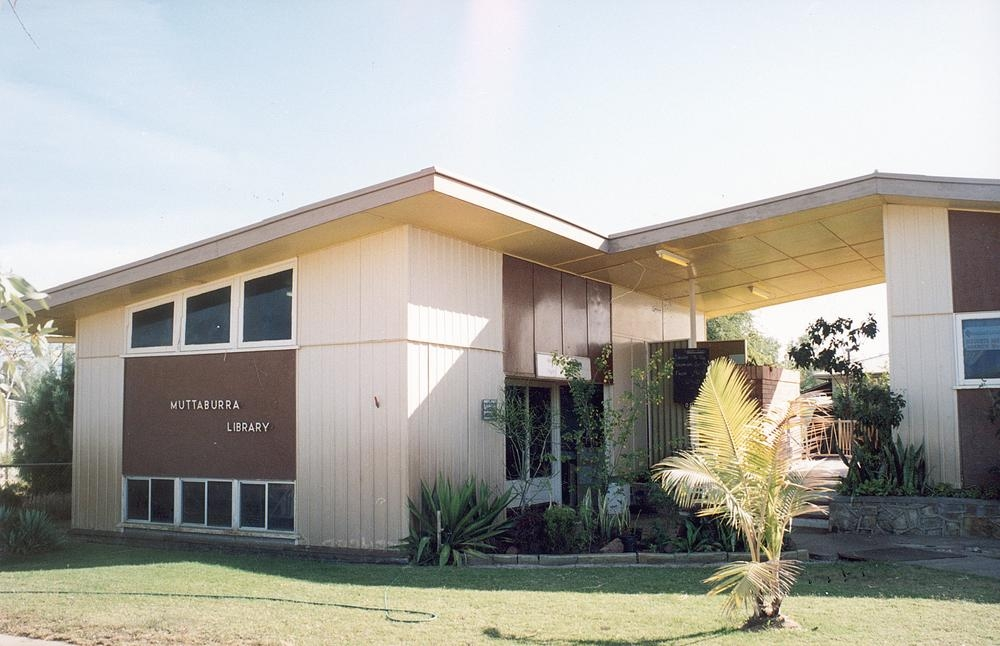
- Muttaburra Library, operated by the Aramac Shire Council

- Country: Australia
- State: Queensland
- Region: Central Queensland
- Established: 1879
- Council seat: Aramac

Area
  - Total: 23,364.1 km^{2} (9,020.9 sq mi)

Population
  - Total: 754 (2006 census)
  - Density: 0.032272/km^{2} (0.08358/sq mi)
LGAs around Shire of Aramac
Winton	Flinders	Dalrymple
Longreach	Shire of Aramac	Belyando
Ilfracombe	Barcaldine	Jericho

The Shire of Aramac was a local government area located in central Queensland about 1,100 kilometres (684 mi) north west of the state capital, Brisbane, between the towns of Barcaldine and Winton. It covered an area of 23,364.1 square kilometres (9,020.9 sq mi), and existed as a local government entity from 1879 until 2008, when it amalgamated with the Shires of Barcaldine and Jericho to form the Barcaldine Region.

== History ==
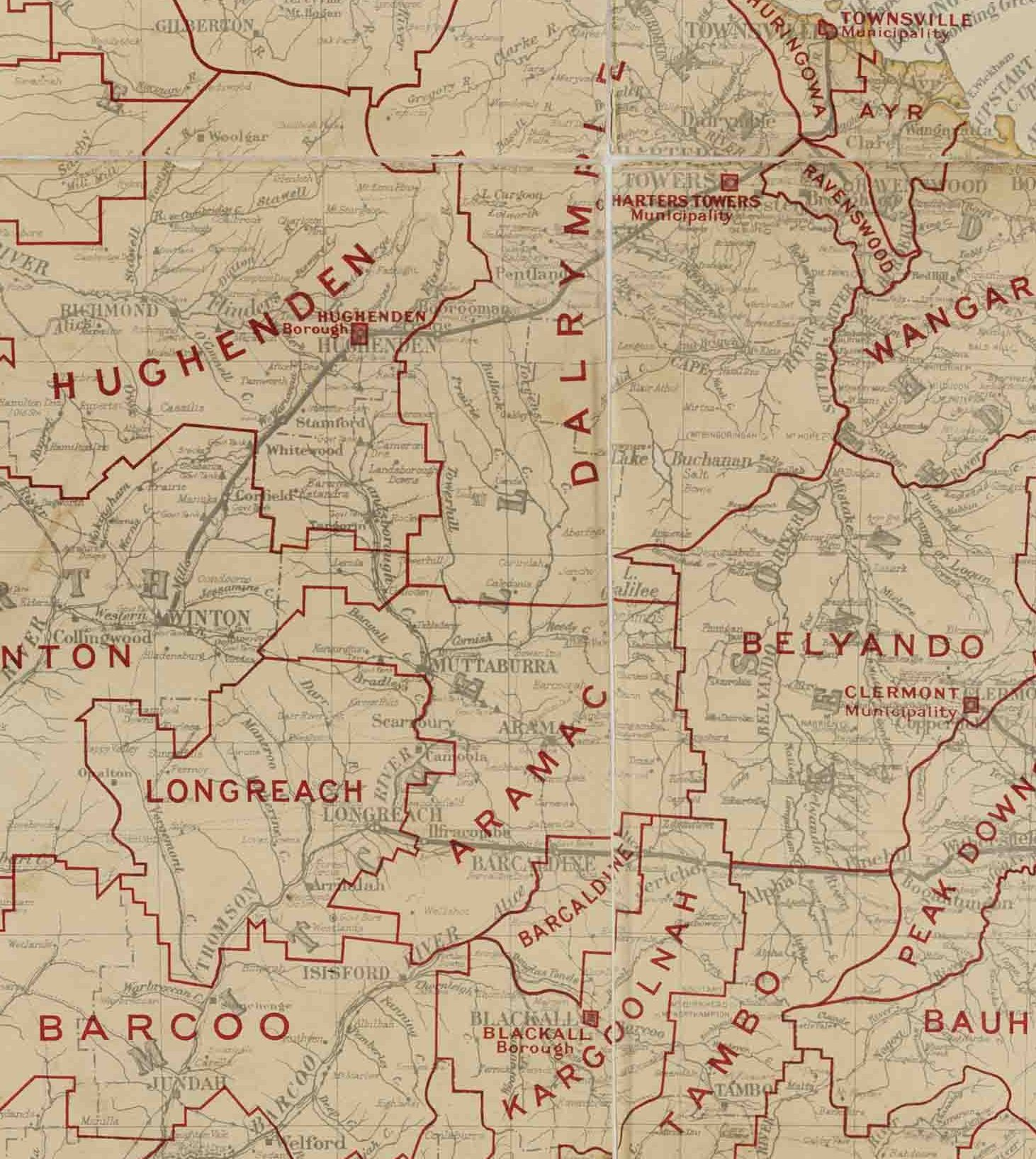
Map of Aramac Division and its adjacent local government areas, March 1902

The Aramac Division was created on 11 November 1879 as one of 74 divisions around Queensland under the Divisional Boards Act 1879 with a population of 841.

On 9 May 1900, part of the Aramac Division was excised to create the new Longreach Division under the Divisional Boards Act 1887.

On 27 December 1902, part of the Aramac Division was excised to create the Ilfracombe Division under the Divisional Boards Act 1887.

With the passage of the Local Authorities Act 1902, Aramac Division became the Shire of Aramac on 31 March 1903.

On 15 March 2008, under the Local Government (Reform Implementation) Act 2007 passed by the Parliament of Queensland on 10 August 2007, the Shire of Aramac merged with the Shires of Barcaldine and Jericho to form the Barcaldine Region.

The Shire operated the Aramac Tramway from Aramac to its junction near Barcaldine with the Central Western railway line from Rockhampton to Longreach from 1911 to 1975.

== Towns and localities ==
The Shire of Aramac included the following settlements:

- Aramac (town)
- Bangall
- Cornish Creek
- Galilee
- Ibis
- Ingberry
- Muttaburra (town)
- Pelican Creek
- Sardine
- Tablederry
- Upland
- Upper Cornish Creek

== Chairmen ==
- 1880: T. Whannell
- 1881: J. Tilbury (resigned November 1881)
- 1882: E.R. Edkins (resigned March 1882)
- 1882: W. Forsyth
- 1883–1884: T. Whannell
- 1885: W. Forsyth
- 1886–1888: E.R. Edkins
- 1889–1890: S.P. Fraser
- 1891: E.R. Edkins
- 1892–1901: S.P. Fraser
- 1902: E.R. Edkins
- 1903–1905: S.P. Fraser
- 1906: D.C.K. Cameron
- 1907–1914: S.P. Fraser
- 1915 – December 1923: E.W. Bowyer
- 1924–1936: Sydney Harold Fraser
- 1936–1939: B. Duke
- 1939–1946: Sydney Harold Fraser
- 1946–1955: R.A. Stobo
- 1955–1976: J.T. Neill
- 1976–1982: O.N. Landers
- 1986: Antonio Monte de Ramos Jr

== Population ==
Year	Population
1933	1,679
1947	1,592
1954	1,714
1961	1,790
1966	1,652
1971	1,168
1976	1,059
1981	1,082
1986	1,097
1991	832
1996	778
2001	742
2006	754

== See also ==
- List of tramways in Queensland
