= Evora, Queensland =

Evora Queensland
- Coordinates: 24.0436°S 145.5413°E
- Population: 0 (2016 census)
  - Density: 0.0000/km^{2} (0.0000/sq mi)
- Postcode(s): 4725
- Area: 508.8 km^{2} (196.4 sq mi)
- Time zone: AEST (UTC+10:00)
- Location: 43.6 km (27 mi) N of Blackall; 94.5 km (59 mi) SSE of Barcaldine; 581 km (361 mi) W of Rockhampton; 1,039 km (646 mi) NW of Brisbane
- LGA(s): Barcaldine Region
- State electorate(s): Gregory
- Federal division(s): Maranoa
Suburbs around Evora:
Narbethong	Narbethong	Narbethong
Home Creek	Evora	Blackall
Blackall	Blackall	Blackall

Evora is a former rural locality in the Barcaldine Region, Queensland, Australia. In the 2016 census, Evora had a population of 0 people.

On 22 November 2019, the Queensland Government decided to amalgamate the localities in the Barcaldine Region, resulting in five expanded localities based on the larger towns: Alpha, Aramac, Barcaldine, Jericho and Muttaburra. Evora was incorporated into Barcaldine.

== Geography ==
The Landsborough Highway forms part of the south-western boundary of the locality.

Evora Creek rises in the south-east of the locality and flows through the locality exiting to the north-west (Narbethong), eventually becoming a tributary of the Alice River.

The principal land use is grazing on native vegetation.

== History ==
The locality takes its name from the pastoral run, which was named by Mr Williams after the residence in St Kilda, Melbourne, of banker Francis Grey Smith, who was Williams' cousin. The house was named after the city of Evora in Portugal.

In October 1892 the Evora wool shed in Evora was destroyed in a fire.

== Education ==
There are no schools in Evora. The nearest primary and secondary schools are in Barcaldine and Blackall.
