= Pelican Creek, Queensland =

Pelican Creek Queensland
- Coordinates: 22.8611°S 145.3877°E
- Population: 20 (2016 census)
  - Density: 0.0107/km^{2} (0.028/sq mi)
- Postcode(s): 4726
- Area: 1,871.8 km^{2} (722.7 sq mi)
- Time zone: AEST (UTC+10:00)
- Location: 42.7 km (27 mi) E of Aramac; 110 km (68 mi) NE of Barcaldine; 689 km (428 mi) W of Rockhampton; 1,182 km (734 mi) NW of Brisbane
- LGA(s): Barcaldine Region
- State electorate(s): Gregory
- Federal division(s): Maranoa
Suburbs around Pelican Creek:
Upper Cornish Creek	Upper Cornish Creek	Upland
Sardine; Ibis	Pelican Creek	Dunrobin
Aramac	Ingberry	Garfield

Pelican Creek is a former rural locality in the Barcaldine Region, Queensland, Australia. In the 2016 census, Pelican Creek had a population of 20 people.

On 22 November 2019, the Queensland Government decided to amalgamate the localities in the Barcaldine Region, resulting in five expanded localities based on the larger towns: Alpha, Aramac, Barcaldine, Jericho and Muttaburra. Pelican Creek was incorporated into Aramac.

== Geography ==
The Muttaburra Aramac Road forms the south-west boundary of the locality.

Pelican Creek (from which the locality presumably takes its name) flows from Lake Mueller in the north of the locality to the south-west of the locality where it becomes a tributary to Aramac Creek, which is in turn a tributary of the Thomson River and contributes to the Lake Eyre drainage basin.

The Aramac Range is within the east and south-east of the locality.

The principal land use is grazing on native vegetation.

== Education ==
There are no schools in Pelican Creek. The nearest primary school is in neighbouring Aramac. The nearest secondary schools are in Aramac (to Year 10 only) and Barcaldine (to Year 12).
