= Drummondslope, Queensland =

Drummondslope Queensland
- Coordinates: 24.0786°S 146.5677°E
- Population: 43 (2016 census)
  - Density: 0.01783/km^{2} (0.0462/sq mi)
- Postcode(s): 4724
- Area: 2,411.7 km^{2} (931.2 sq mi)
- Time zone: AEST (UTC+10:00)
- Location: 56.5 km (35 mi) S of Alpha; 197 km (122 mi) ESE of Barcaldine; 493 km (306 mi) W of Rockhampton; 982 km (610 mi) NW of Brisbane
- LGA(s): Barcaldine Region
- State electorate(s): Gregory
- Federal division(s): Maranoa
Suburbs around Drummondslope:
Hobartville	Hobartville	Alpha
Mexico	Drummondslope	Sedgeford
Blackall	Windeyer	Mantuan Downs

Drummondslope is a former rural locality in the Barcaldine Region, Queensland, Australia. In the 2016 census, Drummondslope had a population of 43 people.

On 22 November 2019, the Queensland Government decided to amalgamate the localities in the Barcaldine Region, resulting in five expanded localities based on the larger towns: Alpha, Aramac, Barcaldine, Jericho and Muttaburra. Drummondslope was incorporated into Alpha.

== Geography ==
The Capricorn Highway and, to its immediate north, the Central Western railway form the northern boundary of the locality. The western boundary roughly follows the Great Dividing Range while the southern boundary follows the southern tip of the Drummond Range (and may be the origin of the locality's name).

The Tambo Road traverses the locality from north-east (Alpha) to south-west (Blackall/Windeyer).

Alpha Creek starts in the south of the locality and flows north through the locality exiting to the north-east (Alpha). Being east of the Great Dividing Range, all watercourses in the area are part of the North East Coast drainage basin. Alpha Creek is a tributary of the Native Companion Creek, then Belyando River, Suttor River and the Burdekin River, which flows into the Coral Sea at Rita Island in the Shire of Burdekin.

The principal land use is grazing on native vegetation.

== History ==
In 1910, the pastoral run Drummondslope was offered for a 20-year lease; the property was 273 square miles (710 km^{2}). Edmund Jowett secured the lease with a bid of £0/20/6 per square mile. Jowett operated many pastoral runs in Australia. In 1930, the property was sold to George Oliver Carter. He sold the property in 1935 to B. Hooke & Co. As at 2019, the Drummondslope pastoral run still exists (24.37°S 146.56°E) but is considerably smaller at 200.6 square kilometres (77.5 sq mi).

== Education ==
There are no schools in Drummondslope. The nearest primary school is in Alpha. The nearest secondary school is in Alpha but only offers secondary schooling to Year 10. The nearest secondary schools to Year 12 is in Barcaldine. Boarding schools and distance education are other options.
