= Mexico, Queensland =

Mexico Queensland
- Coordinates: 23.8672°S 146.1958°E
- Population: 26 (2016 census)
  - Density: 0.00916/km^{2} (0.0237/sq mi)
- Postcode(s): 4728
- Area: 2,839.9 km^{2} (1,096.5 sq mi)
- Time zone: AEST (UTC+10:00)
- Location: 33.9 km (21 mi) S of Jericho; 84.7 km (53 mi) SW of Alpha; 117 km (73 mi) ESE of Barcaldine; 524 km (326 mi) W of Rockhampton; 1,086 km (675 mi) NW of Brisbane
- LGA(s): Barcaldine Region
- County: Mexico County, Queensland
- State electorate(s): Gregory
- Federal division(s): Maranoa
Suburbs around Mexico:
Grant; Garfield	Jericho	Hobartville
Narbethong	Mexico	Drummondslope
Blackall	Blackall	Drummondslope

Mexico is a former rural locality in the Barcaldine Region, Queensland, Australia. In the 2016 census, Mexico had a population of 26 people.

On 22 November 2019, the Queensland Government decided to amalgamate the localities in the Barcaldine Region, resulting in five expanded localities based on the larger towns: Alpha, Aramac, Barcaldine, Jericho and Muttaburra. Mexico was incorporated into Jericho.

== Geography ==
The Capricorn Highway and, to its immediate south, the Central Western railway line form the western end of the northern boundary of the locality. The highway and the railway (but with the railway to the north) form the eastern end of the northern boundary, having crossed within the town of Jericho to the immediate north.

The Great Dividing Range runs through the western part of the locality from north-east to south-east. Jordan Creek rises in the south of the locality and flows north to Jericho. Like all creeks in the locality west of the range, they are eventually tributaries of the Barcoo River within the Lake Eyre drainage basin, whereas watercourses to the east of the range are within the North East Coast drainage basin flowing into the Coral Sea.

The predominant land use is grazing on native vegetation.

== History ==
The origin of the name is unclear, but there was a pastoral run called Mexico in 1880s in the area.

== Education ==
There are no schools in Mexico. The nearest primary school is in Jericho. The nearest secondary schools are in Alpha (to Year 10) and Barcaldine (to Year 12). Due to the travelling time involved, alternatives are boarding schools and distance education.
