= Grant, Queensland =

Grant Queensland
- Coordinates: 23.5855°S 145.6647°E
- Population: 11 (2016 census)
  - Density: 0.0082/km^{2} (0.0211/sq mi)
- Area: 1,348.9 km^{2} (520.8 sq mi)
- Time zone: AEST (UTC+10:00)
- Location: 50.0 km (31 mi) E of Barcaldine; 50.7 km (32 mi) W of Jericho; 540 km (336 mi) W of Rockhampton; 1,123 km (698 mi) NW of Brisbane
- LGA(s): Barcaldine Region
- State electorate(s): Gregory
- Federal division(s): Maranoa
Suburbs around Grant:
Ingberry	Ingberry	Garfield
Barcaldine	Grant	Mexico
Narbethong	Narbethong	Narbethong

Grant is a former rural locality in the Barcaldine Region, Queensland, Australia. In the 2016 census, Grant had a population of 11 people.

On 22 November 2019, the Queensland Government decided to amalgamate the localities in the Barcaldine Region, resulting in five expanded localities based on the larger towns: Alpha, Aramac, Barcaldine, Jericho and Muttaburra. Grant was mostly incorporated into Barcaldine, except for the eastern corner which was incorporated into Jericho.

== Geography ==
The Capricorn Highway and, to its immediate south, Central Western railway line pass through the locality from east (Garfield/Mexico) to the west (Barcaldine).

The Alice River flows through the locality from the north-east (Garfield) to the south-west (Barcaldine).

The undeveloped town of Alice is within Grant, located along the Central Western railway line.

== Education ==
There are no schools in Grant. The nearest primary schools are in Barcaldine and Jericho. The nearest secondary school is in Barcaldine.
