= Saltern Creek, Queensland =

Saltern Creek Queensland
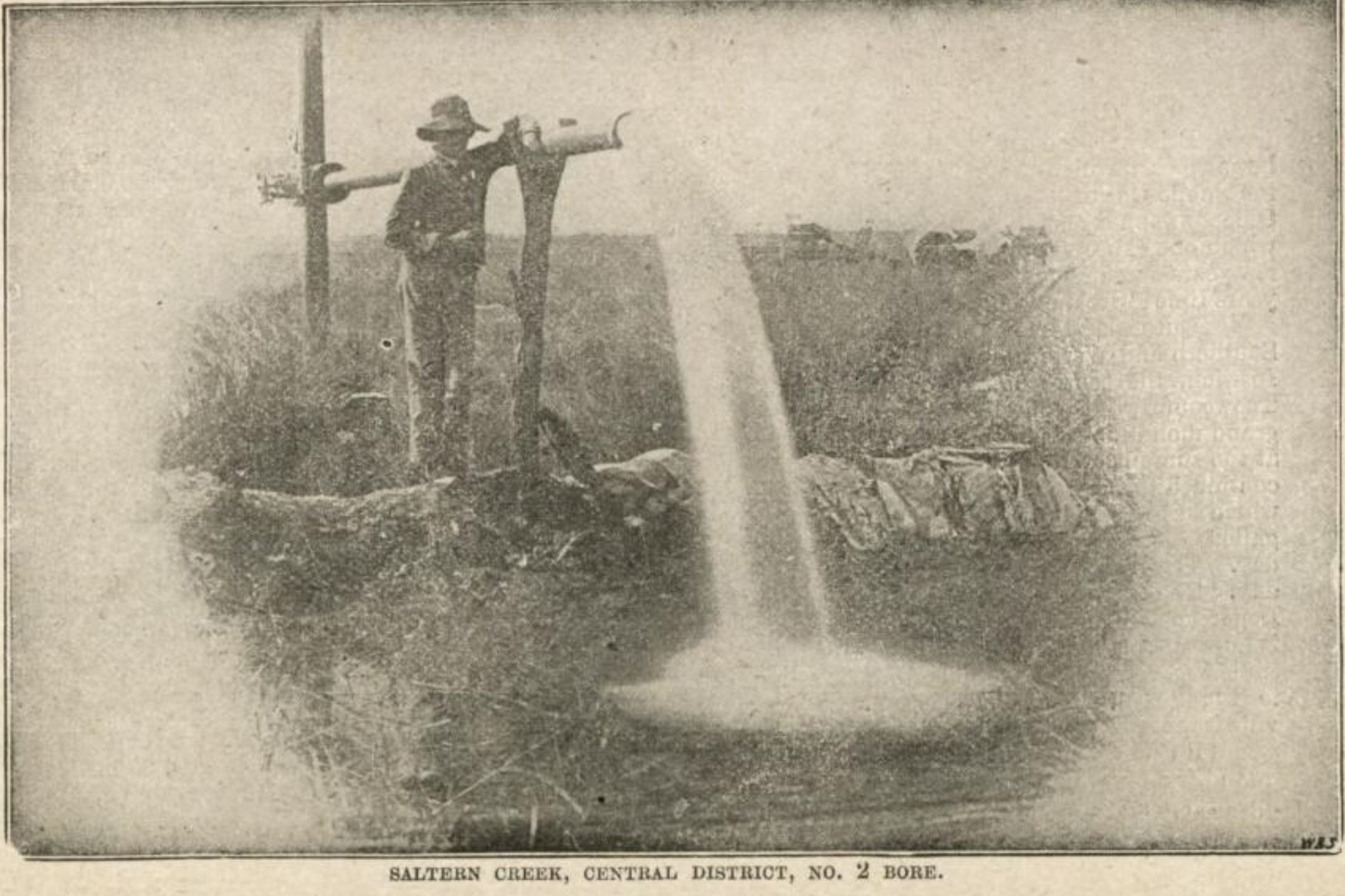
- No 2 bore, Saltern Creek, 1899

- Coordinates: 23.3547°S 145.0797°E
- Population: 12 (2016 census)
  - Density: 0.0180/km^{2} (0.0466/sq mi)
- Area: 666.6 km^{2} (257.4 sq mi)
- Time zone: AEST (UTC+10:00)
- Location: 37.8 km (23 mi) NW of Barcaldine; 144 km (89 mi) E of Longreach; 616 km (383 mi) W of Rockhampton; 1,109 km (689 mi) NW of Brisbane
- LGA(s): Barcaldine Region
- State electorate(s): Gregory
- Federal division(s): Maranoa
Suburbs around Saltern Creek:
Ibis	Ibis	Ingberry
Tara Station	Saltern Creek	Ingberry
Tara Station	Tara Station	Barcaldine

Saltern Creek is a former rural locality in the Barcaldine Region, Queensland, Australia. In the 2016 census, Saltern Creek had a population of 12 people.

On 22 November 2019, the Queensland Government decided to amalgamate the localities in the Barcaldine Region, resulting in five expanded localities based on the larger towns: Alpha, Aramac, Barcaldine, Jericho and Muttaburra. Saltern Creek was incorporated into Barcaldine.

== Geography ==
The watercourse Saltern Creek (after which the locality is presumably named) flows through the locality from south-east (Ingberry) to south-west (Tara Station).

The principal land use is grazing on native vegetation.

== History ==
On 23 March 1888, an artesian bore successfully struck a supply of fresh water at 950 feet (290 m), flowing at a rate of 509 imperial gallons (2,310 L; 611 US gal) per hour. On 17 September 1889 the No 2 bore was successful, finding fresh water at 1,500 feet (460 m) which flowed at a rate of 250,000 imperial gallons (1,100,000 L; 300,000 US gal) per day, that is, 10,416 imperial gallons (47,350 L; 12,509 US gal) per hour, "completely eclipsing" the first bore. On 31 May 1890, No 3 bore struck fresh water at 1,970 feet (600 m) flowing at 690,000 imperial gallons (3,100,000 L; 830,000 US gal) per day at a temperature of 160 °F (71 °C).

== Education ==
There are no schools in Saltern Creek. The nearest primary and secondary schools are in Barcaldine.
