= Garfield, Queensland =

Garfield
- Suburb
- Coordinates: 23.2583°S 145.9747°E
- Country: Australia
- State: Queensland
- LGA: Barcaldine Region
- Location: 47.8 km (29.7 mi) NNW of Jericho; 98.6 km (61.3 mi) NW of Alpha; 119 km (74 mi) NE of Barcaldine; 537 km (334 mi) W of Rockhampton; 1,100 km (680 mi) W of Brisbane

Government
  - State electorate: Gregory
  - Federal division: Maranoa

Area
  - Total: 2,850.5 km^{2} (1,100.6 sq mi)

Population
  - Total: 37 (2016 census)
  - Density: 0.01298/km^{2} (0.0336/sq mi)
- Time zone: UTC+10:00 (AEST)
- Postcode: 4728
Suburbs around Garfield
Pelican Creek	Dunrobin	Dunrobin
Ingberry	Garfield	Hobartville
Grant	Mexico	Jericho

Garfield is a former rural locality in the Barcaldine Region, Queensland, Australia. In the 2016 census, Garfield had a population of 37 people.

On 22 November 2019, the Queensland Government decided to amalgamate the localities in the Barcaldine Region, resulting in five expanded localities based on the larger towns: Alpha, Aramac, Barcaldine, Jericho and Muttaburra. Garfield was mostly incorporated into Jericho, except for the western corner which was incorporated into Aramac.

== Geography ==
The Capricorn Highway and, immediately south, the Central Western railway line form the southern boundary of the locality.

The Great Dividing Range passes through the north-east of the locality.

The Alice River flows through the locality entering from the north-east (Dunrobin) and exiting to the south-west (Grant). It is part of the Lake Eyre drainage basin.

The principal land use in grazing on native vegetation.

== History ==
The town and the parish take their name from a pastoral run named by Thomas Behan in 1886 after the American president James Abram Garfield.

== Education ==
There are no schools in Garfield. The nearest primary school is in neighbouring Jericho and the nearest secondary schools are in Alpha (to Year 10 only) and Barcaldine (to Year 12). However, due to travelling times, boarding schools and distance education are other options.
