= Dunrobin, Queensland =

Dunrobin Queensland
- Coordinates: 22.7711°S 146.0994°E
- Population: 14 (2016 census)
  - Density: 0.00382/km^{2} (0.0099/sq mi)
- Postcode(s): 4728
- Area: 3,669.2 km^{2} (1,416.7 sq mi)
- Time zone: AEST (UTC+10:00)
- Location: 109 km (68 mi) N of Jericho; 160 km (99 mi) NNW of Alpha; 180 km (112 mi) NE of Barcaldine; 599 km (372 mi) WNW of Rockhampton; 1,162 km (722 mi) NW of Brisbane
- LGA(s): Barcaldine Region
- State electorate(s): Gregory
- Federal division(s): Maranoa
Suburbs around Dunrobin:
Galilee	Laglan	Laglan
Upland	Dunrobin	Surbiton
Pelican Creek	Garfield	Hobartville

Dunrobin is a former rural locality in the Barcaldine Region, Queensland, Australia. In the 2016 census, Dunrobin had a population of 14 people.

On 22 November 2019, the Queensland Government decided to amalgamate the localities in the Barcaldine Region, resulting in five expanded localities based on the larger towns: Alpha, Aramac, Barcaldine, Jericho and Muttaburra. Dunrobin was mostly incorporated into Jericho, except for the south-east corner which was incorporated into Alpha and the south-west corner which was incorporated into Aramac.

== Geography ==
The Great Dividing Range passes through the locality from north to south-east, creating a watershed. To the west of the range, the Alice River rises in the south-east of the locality and flows to the south (Garfield) while Clara Creek rises in the south and flows to the west (Upland), eventually becoming a tributary of the Thomson River. Both of these watercourses are within the Lake Eyre drainage basin. In contrast, Dunda Creek also rises in the south-east of the locality but to the east of range. Dunda Creek flows north through the locality exiting to the north-east (Laglan), eventually contributing to the Burdekin River in the North East Coast drainage basin.

In the south-east of the locality are two protected areas, the Cudmore National Park and the Cudmore Resources Reserve.

Apart from the protected areas, the principal land use is grazing on native vegetation.

== Education ==
There are no schools in Dunrobin. The nearest primary schools are in Aramac 121 kilometres (75 mi), Jericho 109 kilometres (68 mi) and Mistake Creek 115 kilometres (71 mi). The nearest secondary school is in Aramac but only offers secondary schooling to Year 10. For Years 11 and 12, the nearest schools are in Barcaldine 180 kilometres (110 mi) and Clermont 222 kilometres (138 mi). However, the long driving times on the poor roads in this area make it unlikely that children could feasibly attend any of these schools. Boarding schools and distance education would be the alternatives.
