= Ingberry, Queensland =

Ingberry Queensland
- Coordinates: 23.2463°S 145.4636°E
- Population: 11 (2016 census)
  - Density: 0.00439/km^{2} (0.0114/sq mi)
- Area: 2,507.0 km^{2} (968.0 sq mi)
- Time zone: AEST (UTC+10:00)
- Location: 40.2 km (25 mi) SE of Aramac; 93.5 km (58 mi) NE of Barcaldine; 672 km (418 mi) WNW of Rockhampton; 1,165 km (724 mi) NW of Brisbane
- LGA(s): Barcaldine Region
- State electorate(s): Gregory
- Federal division(s): Maranoa
Suburbs around Ingberry:
Aramac	Pelican Creek	Pelican Creek
Ibis	Ingberry	Garfield
Saltern Creek	Barcaldine	Grant

Ingberry is a former rural locality in the Barcaldine Region, Queensland, Australia. In the 2016 census, Ingberry had a population of 11 people.

On 22 November 2019, the Queensland Government decided to amalgamate the localities in the Barcaldine Region, resulting in five expanded localities based on the larger towns: Alpha, Aramac, Barcaldine, Jericho and Muttaburra. The larger southern part of Ingberry was incorporated into Barcaldine, while the smaller northern part was incorporated into Aramac.

== Geography ==
The Barcaldine Aramac Road passes through the locality entering from the south (Barcaldine) and exiting to the west (Ibis).

Aramac Creek rises in the south-east of the locality and flows through the locality, exiting to the north (Pelican Creek). It is a tributary of the Thomson River which is part of the Lake Eyre drainage basin.

The principal land use is grazing.

== Education ==
There are no schools in Ingberry. The nearest primary schools are in neighbouring Aramac and Barcaldine. The nearest secondary schools are also in Aramac (to Year 10 only) and Barcaldine (to Year 12).
