= Hobartville, Queensland =

Hobartville Queensland
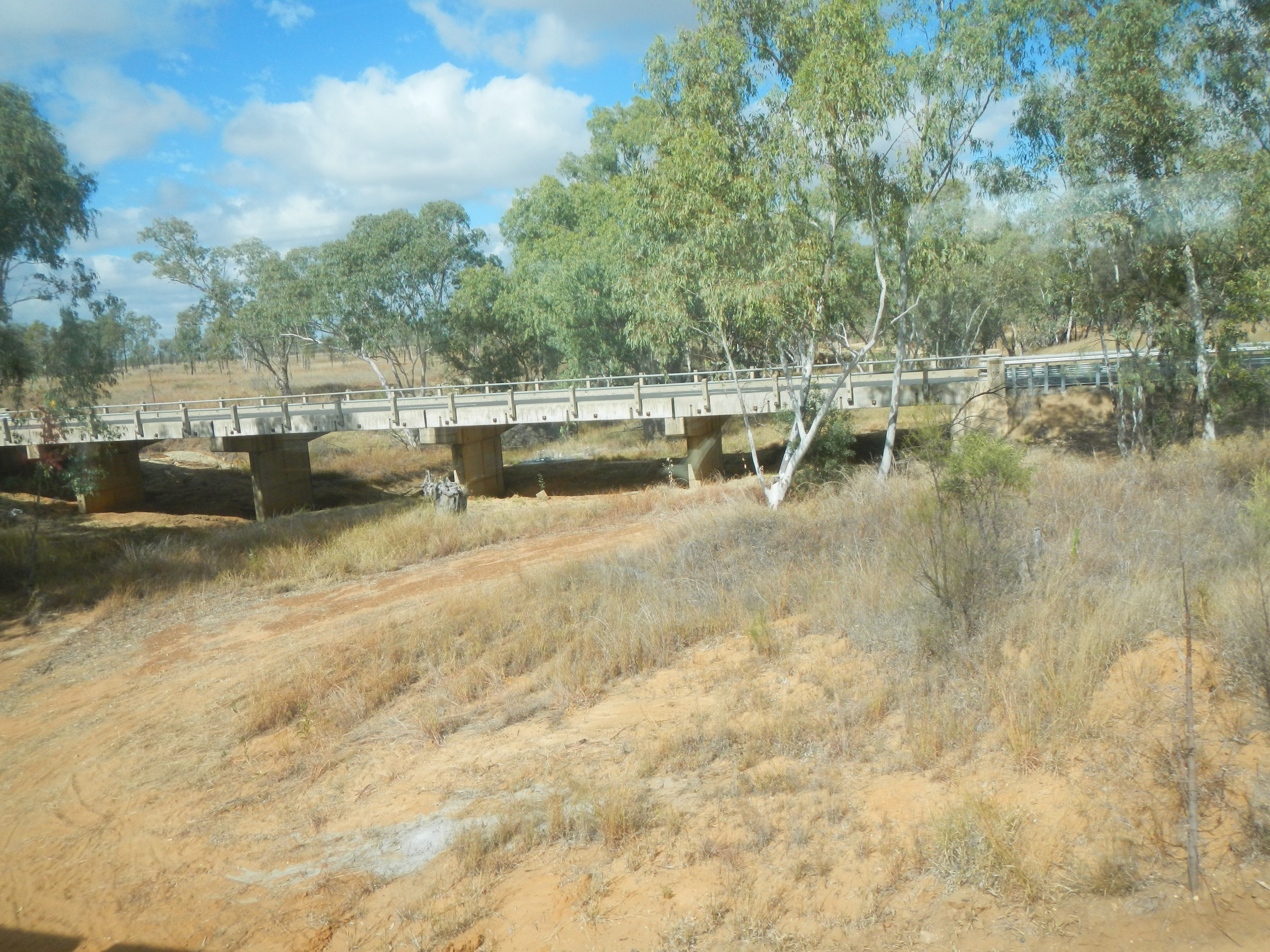
- Capricorn Highway crossing over Tallarenha Creek at Hobartville, 2013

- Coordinates: 23.3561°S 146.3805°E
- Population: 50 (2016 census)
  - Density: 0.0223/km^{2} (0.058/sq mi)
- Postcode(s): 4724
- Area: 2,245.1 km^{2} (866.8 sq mi)
- Time zone: AEST (UTC+10:00)
- Location: 42.0 km (26 mi) NE of Jericho; 71.6 km (44 mi) NW of Alpha; 131 km (81 mi) ENE of Barcaldine; 535 km (332 mi) W of Rockhampton; 1,098 km (682 mi) NW of Brisbane
- LGA(s): Barcaldine Region
- State electorate(s): Gregory
- Federal division(s): Maranoa
Suburbs around Hobartville:
Dunrobin	Surbiton	Surbiton
Garfield	Hobartville	Surbiton
Jericho	Mexico; Drummondslope	Alpha

Hobartville is a former rural locality in the Barcaldine Region, Queensland, Australia. In the 2016 census, Hobartville had a population of 50 people.

On 22 November 2019, the Queensland Government decided to amalgamate the localities in the Barcaldine Region, resulting in five expanded localities based on the larger towns: Alpha, Aramac, Barcaldine, Jericho and Muttaburra. The northern and eastern parts of Hobartville were incorporated into Alpha, while the south-western part was incorporated into Jericho.

== Geography ==
The Central Western railway line and, to its immediate south, the Capricorn Highway form the southern boundary of the locality.

The Great Dividing Range passes through the south-west of the locality. Therefore most of the locality is within the North East Coast drainage basin. Therefore the creeks within the locality are tributaries eventually of the Burdekin River which empties into the Coral Sea at Rita Island in the Shire of Burdekin.

The principal land use is grazing on native vegetation.

== History ==
The origin of the locality name is unclear but it is likely to have been taken from the Hobartville pastoral run operated by Mr Holland in 1885.

== Education ==
There are no schools in Hobartville. The nearest primary schools are in neighbouring Jericho and Alpha. The nearest secondary school is in Alpha but only to Year 10. For Years 11 and 12 the nearest secondary schools are in Barcaldine and Emerald. Boarding schools and distance education might also be used.
