= Bangall, Queensland =

Bangall Queensland
- Coordinates: 22.4202°S 144.0091°E
- Population: 4 (2016 census)
  - Density: 0.00179/km^{2} (0.0046/sq mi)
- Postcode(s): 4726
- Area: 2,230.6 km^{2} (861.2 sq mi)
- Location: 66.4 km (41 mi) WNW of Muttaburra; 141 km (88 mi) E of Winton; 219 km (136 mi) NW of Barcaldine; 1,289 km (801 mi) NW of Brisbane
- LGA(s): Barcaldine Region
- State electorate(s): Gregory
- Federal division(s): Maranoa
Suburbs around Bangall:
Corfield	Corfield	Corfield
Corfield	Bangall	Tablederry
Longreach	Longreach	Longreach

Bangall is a former rural locality in the Barcaldine Region, Queensland, Australia. In the 2016 census, Bangall had a population of 4 people.

On 22 November 2019, the Queensland Government decided to amalgamate the localities in the Barcaldine Region, resulting in five expanded localities based on the larger towns: Alpha, Aramac, Barcaldine, Jericho and Muttaburra. Bangall was incorporated into Muttaburra.

== Geography ==
Bangall Creek and Western Creek flow through the locality towards the south-east, eventually becoming tributaries of the Thomson River and hence part of the Lake Eyre basin.

The predominant land use is cattle grazing.

== Education ==
There are no schools in Bangall. The nearest primary schools are in Muttaburra and Winton and the nearest secondary schools are in Aramac, Barcaldine, Longreach and Winton.
