= Mount Cornish Homestead =

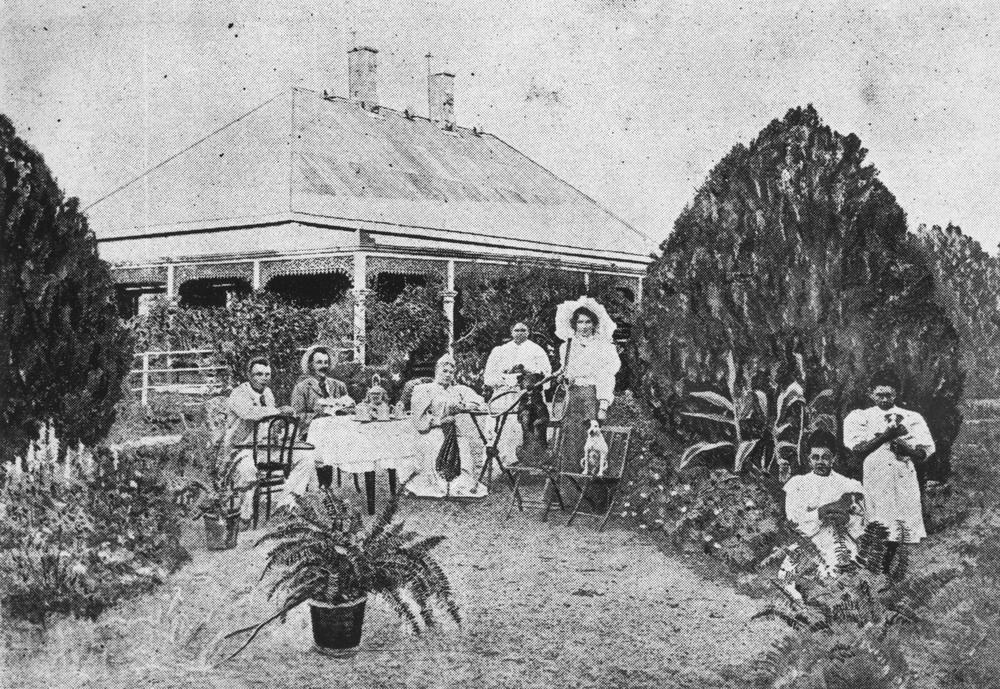
- Tea party at Mount Cornish Homestead, 1898

- Location within Queensland Location within Australia
- 22.5538°S 144.6125°E
- Location: Cornish Creek near Muttaburra, Barcaldine Region, Queensland, Australia

Queensland Heritage Register
- Official name: Mt Cornish Homestead
- Type: state heritage
- Designated: 21 August 1992
- Reference no.: 600009

Mount Cornish Homestead is a heritage-listed homestead at Cornish Creek near Muttaburra, Barcaldine Region, Queensland, Australia. It was added to the Queensland Heritage Register on 21 August 1992.

== History ==
Mount Cornish was established on the head of the Thomson River in 1872 as an outstation of the Bowen Downs Station which was taken up by William Landsborough in 1861. The Edkins family, along with 12,000 head of cattle were sent to manage Bowen Downs Station, from which Mount Cornish was later resumed. Prior to the construction of a wooden house in 1876, the Edkins lived in a simple mud hut with a roof of bark. In 1883, a stone section was added to the wooden house. It comprised two rooms surrounded by a verandah. The white stone was quarried approximately one mile from the site and it is thought to have been constructed by two highly skilled German masons. Mount Cornish was partially resumed in 1889. The property was again divided in 1895 and this was followed by droughts which lasted until 1902. Bowen Downs was partially resumed after the lease expired in 1927 and continued to operate as a sheep and cattle run until the 1960s.

== Heritage listing ==
Mount Cornish Homestead was listed on the Queensland Heritage Register on 21 August 1992.
