= UTB =

UTB may stand for:

- The University of Texas at Brownsville (formerly known as UTB/TSC)
- USCG Utility Boat
- Under the Blacklight
- Universidad Tecnológica de Bolívar
- Universiti Teknologi Brunei
- Uzina Tractorul Braşov (Braşov Tractor Factory), a Romanian producer of tractors
- United Television Broadcasting Systems
- Untribium, a hypothetical chemical element
- "Under the Bridge", a song by the Red Hot Chili Peppers
- United Television Broadcasting, a TV channel in California
- Muttaburra Airport, IATA airport code "UTB"
- Up The Boro, associated with fans of Middlesbrough Football Club
