= Central West Queensland =

Coordinates: 23°00′S 145°00′E

- Region
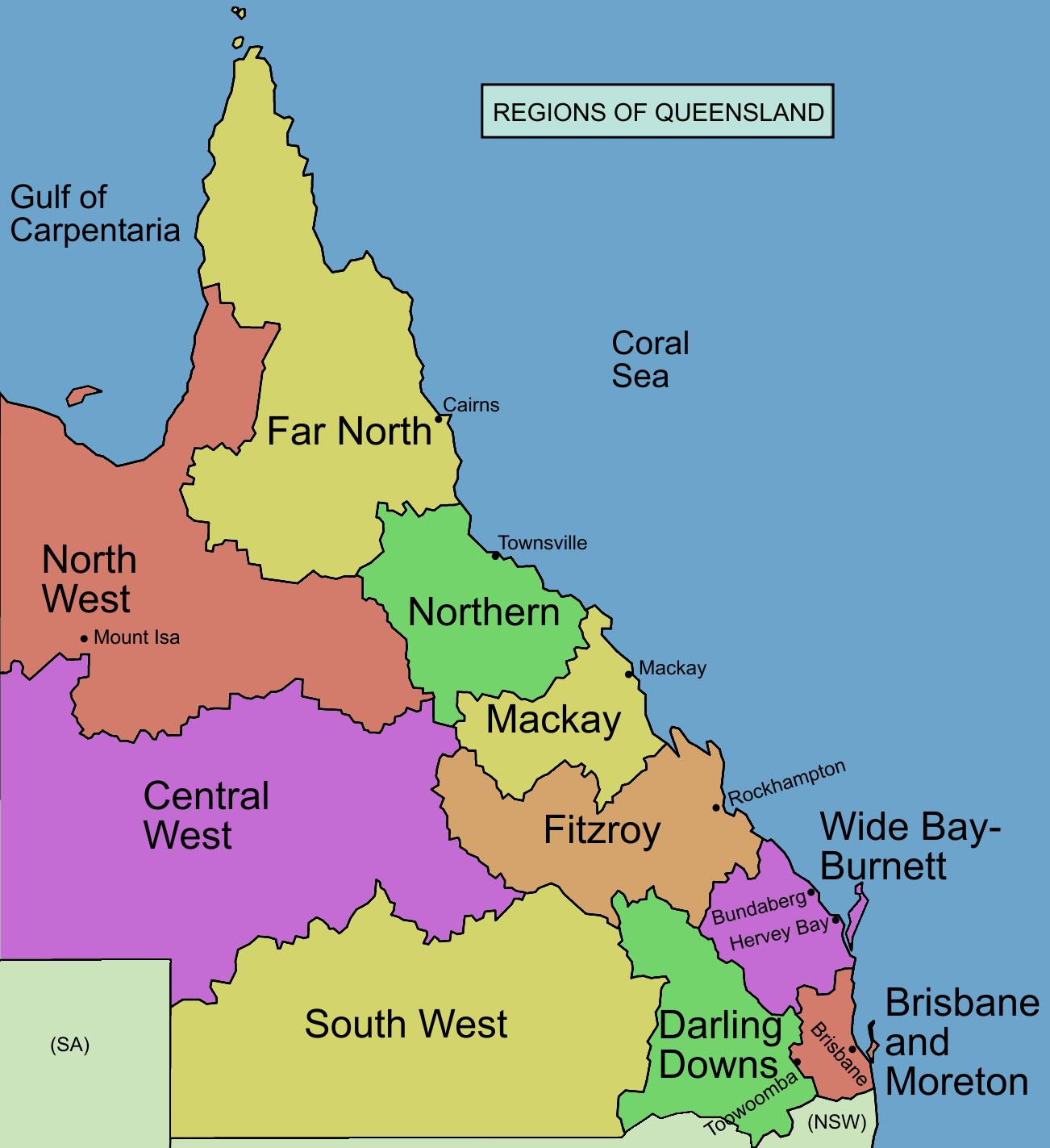
- Regions of Queensland
- Country: Australia
- State: Queensland
- LGA: Shire of Barcoo, Shire of Diamantina, Shire of Boulia, Shire of Winton, Longreach Region, Blackall-Tambo Region, Barcaldine Region

Government
  - State electorate: Gregory
  - Federal division: Maranoa, Kennedy

Area
  - Total: 396,650.2 km^{2} (153,147.5 sq mi)

Population
  - Total: 12,387 (2010)
  - Density: 0.0312290/km^{2} (0.080883/sq mi)

Central West Queensland (abbreviated CWQ) is a remote region in the Australian state of Queensland which covers 396,650.2 km^{2}. The region lies to the north of South West Queensland and south of the Gulf Country. It has a population of approximately 12,387 people. As of 2018, it is one of 16 Aged Care Planning Regions (ACPR) in Queensland.

== History ==
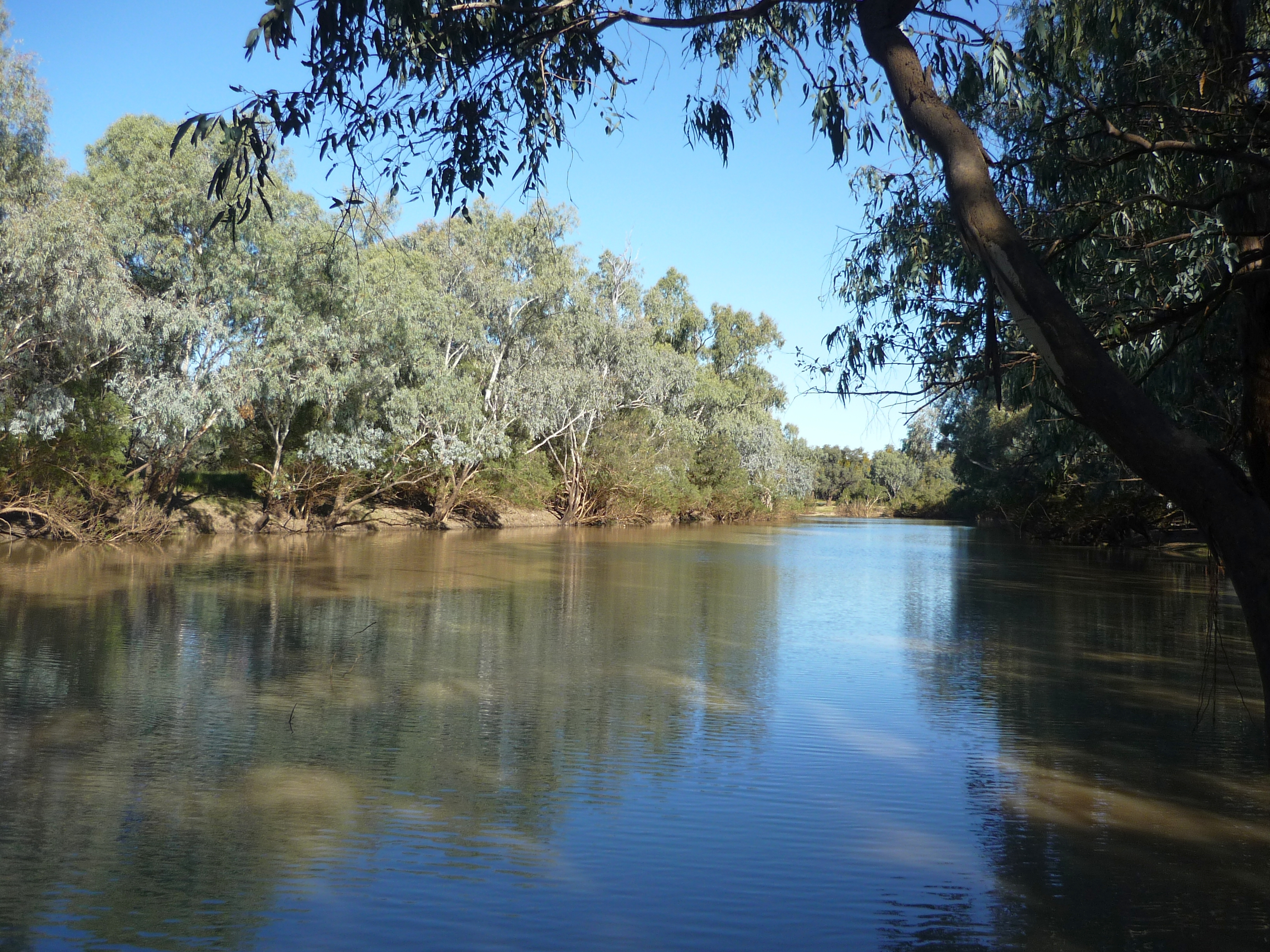
Barcoo River at Isisford, 2011

The first exploration by Europeans was by Major Thomas Mitchell who passed through the area in 1846. Mitchell was near Isisford on the Barcoo River when his party was lacking supplies and threatened by Aboriginals. He then decided to return to Sydney, completing a successful expedition which had explored a large area of unknown country.

== Geography ==
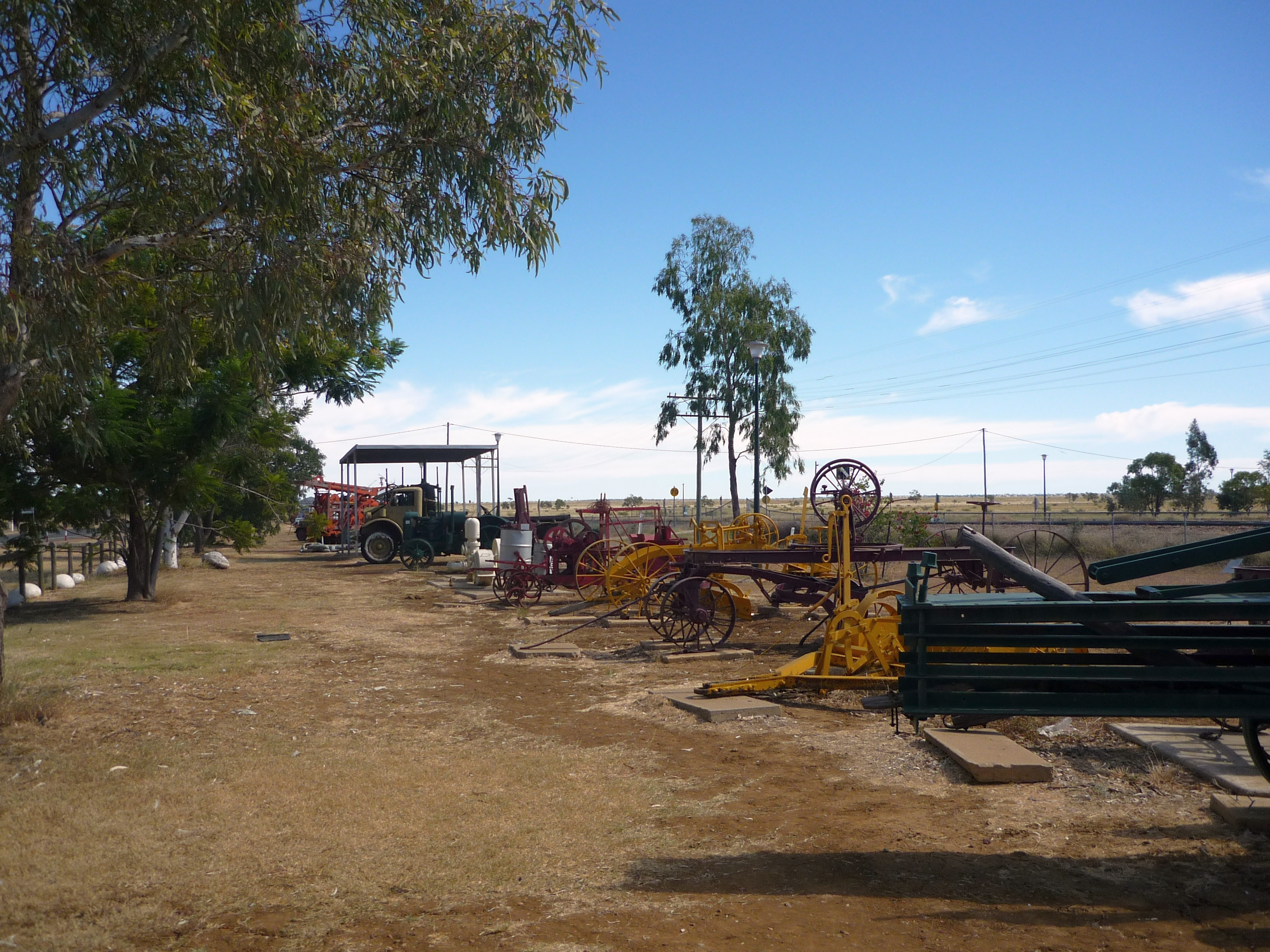
Farming equipment along the Landsborough Highway at Ilfracombe, 2011

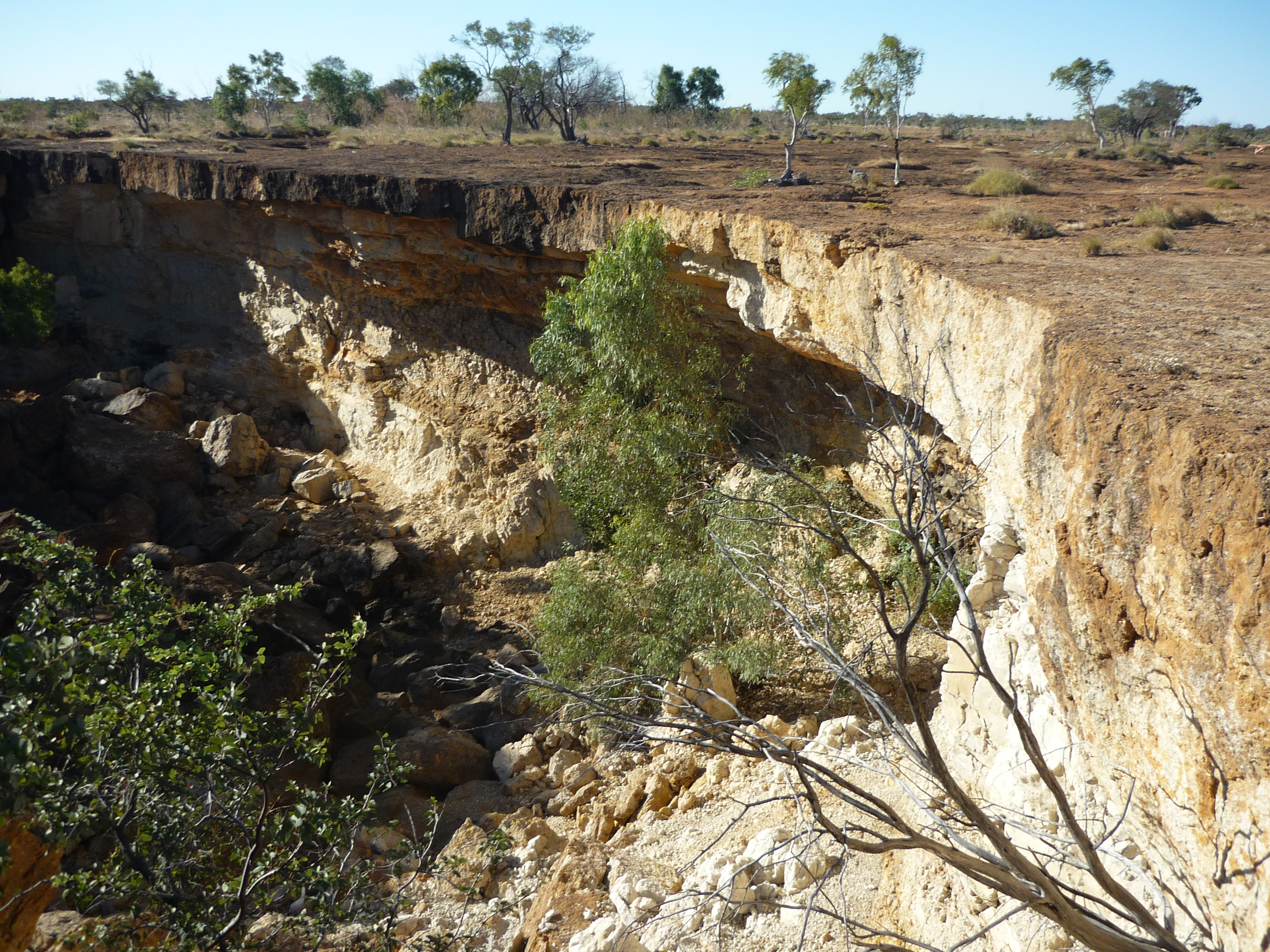
Scrammy Gorge near Winton, 2011

The eastern extent of the Simpson Desert lies within the region. Haddon Corner and Poeppel Corner on the Queensland border are also located here. Bioregions in the area include the Channel Country.

Part of the Cooper Basin is located in the region. The basin contains the most significant on-shore petroleum and natural gas deposits in Australia.

At the federal level the region partly falls in the Division of Maranoa and the Division of Kennedy. Local government areas included in the region are Shire of Barcoo, Shire of Diamantina, Shire of Boulia, Shire of Winton, Longreach Region, Blackall-Tambo Region and Barcaldine Region.

=== Geology ===
The Diamantina River's hook-shaped upper reaches have drawn scientific attention. In March 2015, Geoscience Australia reported that the river's course at and near its headwaters flows along the edge of a roughly circular crustal anomaly that might well be an impact structure. It is 130 km in diameter and lies some 60 km west of Winton; Middleton and Dagworth Station lie right in it. The asteroid impact, if indeed this is the explanation for the anomaly, would have happened roughly 300 million years ago.

=== Settlements ===
Major towns of Central West Queensland include Longreach, Winton, Blackall and Barcaldine. Barcaldine was the location for the 1891 Australian shearers' strike, one of Australia's earliest and most important industrial disputes. The Australian Stockman's Hall of Fame is a museum located in Longreach which pays tribute to pioneers of the Australian outback. The building was completed in 1987 and opened by Queen Elizabeth II on 29 April 1988.

Smaller towns in the region include Bedourie, Birdsville, Boulia, Urandangi, Ilfracombe, Isisford, Yaraka, Jundah, Stonehenge, Windorah, Alpha, Aramac, Jericho, Tambo and Muttaburra.

The ghost town of Betoota has been designated as Australia's smallest town. Other ghost towns in the region include Scarrbury and Collingwood, both of which have vanished without a trace. There is also the depopulated town of Middleton, with only a handful of inhabitants.

=== Rivers ===
Waterways coursing through Central West Queensland include the Barcoo River, Georgina River, Diamantina River, Thomson River, Burke River, Hamilton River and Cooper Creek.

=== Protected areas ===
A number of national parks have been declared in the region, including Simpson Desert National Park, Cudmore National Park, Diamantina National Park, Astrebla Downs National Park, Welford National Park, Goneaway National Park, Lochern National Park and Bladensburg National Park.

== Transport ==
Major roads in the region include the Capricorn Highway and the Landsborough Highway. In the north of the region, the Kennedy Highway leads from Boulia to Cairns on the eastern coast of Australia. The Central railway line reached Longreach in 1892. Today, the Spirit of the Outback is a long-distance passenger rail service operating from Brisbane to Longreach. The region is serviced by six airports, including Longreach Airport, Winton Airport, Windorah Airport, Barcaldine Airport, Aramac Airport and Blackall Airport.

== Media ==
Through a series of transmitters and repeater stations located throughout the vast region, Central West Queensland is serviced by the local ABC radio station ABC Western Queensland along with commercial stations 4LG and West FM, both owned by Resonate Broadcasting.

The Central West's local newspaper is The Longreach Leader, published weekly.

== See also ==
- Lake Galilee
- Regions of Queensland
- Windorah Solar Farm
