= Narbethong =

Narbethong may refer to:

- Narbethong, Queensland, a locality in the Barcaldine Region, Queensland, Australia
- Narbethong, Victoria, a town in central Victoria, Australia
