= Narbethong, Queensland =

Narbethong Queensland
- Coordinates: 23.8180°S 145.6513°E
- Population: 0 (2016 census)
  - Density: 0.0000/km^{2} (0.0000/sq mi)
- Area: 1,060.2 km^{2} (409.3 sq mi)
- Time zone: AEST (UTC+10:00)
- Location: 60.1 km (37 mi) SE of Barcaldine; 70.3 km (44 mi) SW of Jericho; 104 km (65 mi) N of Blackall; 560 km (348 mi) W of Rockhampton; 1,080 km (671 mi) NW of Brisbane
- LGA(s): Barcaldine Region
- State electorate(s): Gregory
- Federal division(s): Maranoa
Suburbs around Narbethong:
Barcaldine	Grant	Grant
Patrick	Narbethong	Mexico
Home Creek	Evora	Blackall

Narbethong was a rural locality in the Barcaldine Region, Queensland, Australia. In the 2016 census, Narbethong had a population of 0 people.

On 22 November 2019, the Queensland Government decided to amalgamate the localities in the Barcaldine Region, resulting in five expanded localities based on the larger towns: Alpha, Aramac, Barcaldine, Jericho and Muttaburra. Most of Narbethong was incorporated into Barcaldine, except for the north-eastern corner which was incorporated into Jericho.

== Geography ==
The Landsborough Highway forms the western boundary of the locality. Narbethong Road commences at the highway and passes west to east through the locality.

The principal land use is grazing on native vegetation.

== Education ==
There are no schools in Narbethong. The nearest primary schools are in Barcaldine, Jericho, and Blackall. The nearest secondary schools are in Barcaldine and Blackall.
