= Ibis, Queensland =

Ibis Queensland
- Coordinates: 23.0816°S 145.0650°E
- Population: 4 (2016 census)
  - Density: 0.0034/km^{2} (0.0089/sq mi)
- Area: 1,166.6 km^{2} (450.4 sq mi)
- Time zone: AEST (UTC+10:00)
- Location: 16.8 km (10 mi) SW of Aramac; 78.9 km (49 mi) N of Barcaldine; 657 km (408 mi) WNW of Rockhampton; 1,151 km (715 mi) NW of Brisbane
- LGA(s): Barcaldine Region
- State electorate(s): Gregory
- Federal division(s): Maranoa
Suburbs around Ibis:
Sardine	Pelican Creek	Aramac
Ilfracombe	Ibis	Ingberry
Tara Station	Saltern Creek	Ingberry

Ibis is a former rural locality in the Barcaldine Region, Queensland, Australia. In the 2016 census, Ibis had a population of 4 people.

On 22 November 2019, the Queensland Government decided to amalgamate the localities in the Barcaldine Region, resulting in five expanded localities based on the larger towns: Alpha, Aramac, Barcaldine, Jericho and Muttaburra. Ibis was incorporated into Aramac.

== Geography ==
The Ilfracombe Aramac Road passes through the locality from the south-west (Ilfracombe) to the north-east (Aramac).

Aramac Creek flows from the north-east of the locality (Aramac) to the north-west (Sardine). The creek is a tributary of the Thomson River which is part of the Lake Eyre drainage basin.

The principal land use is grazing.

== Education ==
There are no schools in Ibis. The nearest primary school is in neighbouring Aramac. The nearest secondary schools are in Aramac (to Year 10 only) and in Barcaldine (to Year 12).
