= Sardine, Queensland =

Sardine Queensland
- Coordinates: 22.8569°S 144.7894°E
- Population: 5 (2016 census)
  - Density: 0.00315/km^{2} (0.0081/sq mi)
- Area: 1,589.0 km^{2} (613.5 sq mi)
- Time zone: AEST (UTC+10:00)
- Location: 76.2 km (47 mi) NW of Aramac; 104 km (65 mi) NE of Longreach; 144 km (89 mi) NW of Barcaldine; 1,216 km (756 mi) NW of Brisbane
- LGA(s): Barcaldine Region
- State electorate(s): Gregory
- Federal division(s): Maranoa
Suburbs around Sardine:
Cornish Creek	Cornish Creek	Upper Cornish Creek
Camoola	Sardine	Pelican Creek
Camoola	Ilfracombe	Ibis

Sardine is a former rural locality in the Barcaldine Region, Queensland, Australia. In the 2016 census, Sardine had a population of 5 people.

On 22 November 2019, the Queensland Government decided to amalgamate the localities in the Barcaldine Region, resulting in five expanded localities based on the larger towns: Alpha, Aramac, Barcaldine, Jericho and Muttaburra. The eastern part of Sardine was incorporated into Aramac, while the western part was incorporated into Muttaburra.

== Geography ==
The Muttaburra Aramac Road forms part of the northern boundary of the locality and then passes through the locality to the east, then forming part of the north-east boundary. The Crossmoor Road passes through the locality from the north-west (Muttaburra) to the south-west (Longreach).

The Thomson River forms the western boundary of the locality. Aramac Creek flows through the locality from the south-east (Ibis) to the south-west (Longreach), where it becomes a tributary of the Thomson River. Sardine Creek (after which the locality is presumably named) rises in the north of the locality and flows south to become a tributary of Aramac Creek. All the watercourses in the locality are part of the Lake Eyre drainage basin.

The principal land use is grazing.

== Education ==
There are no schools in Sardine. The nearest primary schools are in Aramac, Muttaburra and Ilfracombe. The nearest secondary schools are in Aramac (to Year 10 only), Barcaldine (to Year 12) and Longreach (to Year 12).
