= Alice, Queensland =

Alice Queensland
- Coordinates: 23.5662°S 145.7983°E
- Postcode(s): 4725
- Time zone: AEST (UTC+10:00)
- Location: 37.3 km (23 mi) W of Jericho; 52.9 km (33 mi) E of Barcaldine; 527 km (327 mi) W of Rockhampton; 1,126 km (700 mi) NW of Brisbane
- LGA(s): Barcaldine Region
- State electorate(s): Gregory
- Federal division(s): Maranoa

Alice is an undeveloped rural town in the locality of Barcaldine in the Barcaldine Region, Queensland, Australia.

== Geography ==
The town is located to the immediate south of the Capricorn Highway and Central Western railway line. It was served by the Alice railway station.

The town sits between two branches of the Alice River, the western smaller branch is nicknamed as the Dry Alice and the eastern larger branch is known as Wet Alice.

The town shows no evidence of having developed.

== History ==
The town takes its name from the Alice River, which in turn was named Sir Thomas Mitchell on 23 September 1846.

In April 1924 a railway accident occurred when the train crossed the railway bridge over the Dry Alice. The bridge was undergoing repairs and it collapsed, derailing the train. The train was damaged but no passengers were injured.
