= Muttaburra Airport =

- IATA: UTB; ICAO: YMTB

Summary
- Airport type: Public
- Operator: Barcaldine Regional Council
- Location: Muttaburra, Queensland, Australia
- Elevation AMSL: 753 ft / 230 m
- Coordinates: 22°34′59″S 144°31′43″E

Map
- Location in Queensland

Runways
Direction	Length		Surface
Direction	m	ft	Surface
04/22	1,524	5,000	Bitumen
- Source: Enroute Supplement Australia

Muttaburra Airport (IATA: UTB, ICAO: YMTB) is a small airstrip in the remote town of Muttaburra in the state of Queensland, Australia. The airport is located about 6 km (4 mi) from the town and is near the golf course.

Its main use is for bringing in supplies, but it is also used by the Royal Flying Doctor Service of Australia and some of the local property owners that hire a plane because they don't have their own airstrip or plane to fly to major cities or towns to go shopping and get more supplies.

== See also ==
- List of airports in Queensland
