= Goneaway National Park =

National park in Australia

- IUCN category II (national park)
- Location within Queensland
- Location: Queensland
- Coordinates: 23°46′02″S 142°13′47″E
- Area: 248 km^{2} (96 sq mi)
- Established: 1994
- Governing body: Queensland Parks and Wildlife Service

Goneaway is a national park in Central West Queensland, Australia, 1158 km west of Brisbane.

The park is a habitat for 17 species of plants and 55 species of animals. The elevation of the terrain is 215 metres.

== See also ==
- Protected areas of Queensland
