= Barcaldine Region =

Coordinates: 23°34′S 145°17′E

- Local government area
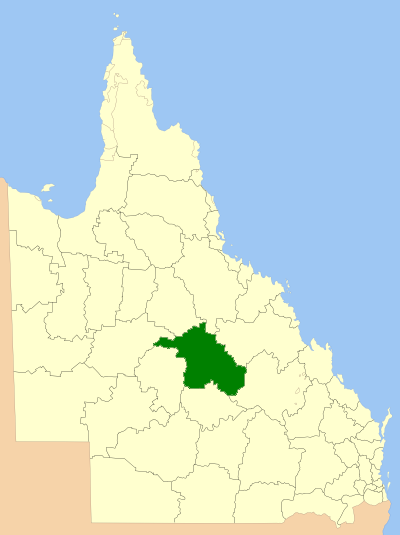
- Location within Queensland

- Interactive map of Barcaldine Region
- Country: Australia
- State: Queensland
- Region: Central West Queensland
- Established: 2008
- Council seat: Barcaldine

Government
  - Mayor: Sean Micheal Dillion
  - State electorate: Gregory
  - Federal division: Maranoa

Area
  - Total: 53,383 km^{2} (20,611 sq mi)

Population
  - Total: 2,849 (2021 census)
  - Density: 0.053369/km^{2} (0.138225/sq mi)
- Website: Barcaldine Region
LGAs around Barcaldine Region
Winton	Flinders	Charters Towers
Longreach	Barcaldine Region	Isaac / Central Highlands
Longreach	Blackall-Tambo	Central Highlands

The Barcaldine Region is a local government area in Central West Queensland, Australia. Established in 2008, it was preceded by three previous local government areas which had existed for over a century.

It has an estimated operating budget of A$21.6 million.

In the 2021 census, the Barcaldine Region had a population of 2,849 people.

== History ==
Barcaldine Region includes the traditional tribal lands of the Iningai. Iningai (also known as Yiningay, Muttaburra, Tateburra, Yinangay, Yinangi) is an Australian Aboriginal language spoken by the Iningai people. The Iningai language region includes the landscape within the local government boundaries of the Longreach Region and Barcaldine Region, particularly the towns of Longreach, Barcaldine, Muttaburra and Aramac as well as the properties of Bowen Downs and catchments of Cornish Creek and Alice River.

Kuungkari (also known as Kungkari and Koonkerri) is a language of Western Queensland. The Kuungkari language region includes the landscape within the local government boundaries of Longreach Shire Council and Blackall-Tambo Shire Council.

Jirandali (also known as Yirandali, Warungu, Yirandhali) is an Australian Aboriginal language of North-West Queensland, particularly the Hughenden area. The language region includes the local government area of the Shire of Flinders, including Dutton River, Flinders River, Mount Sturgeon, Caledonia (in the Barcaldine Region), Richmond, Corfield, Winton, Torrens, Tower Hill, Landsborough Creek, Lammermoor Station, Hughenden, and Tangorin.

Prior to the 2008 amalgamation, the Barcaldine Region existed as three distinct local government areas:

- the Shire of Barcaldine;
- the Shire of Aramac;
- and the Shire of Jericho.

When the Divisional Boards Act 1879 was proclaimed on 11 November 1879, what is now the Barcaldine Region was part of the Barcaldine, Aramac, Kargoolnah and Bauhinia divisions. With the passage of the Local Authorities Act 1902, all four became Shires on 31 March 1903. A number of boundary changes took place thereafter, but by the establishment of the Shire of Jericho on 1 January 1916, the boundaries were to remain unchanged for 92 years.

In July 2007, the Local Government Reform Commission released its report and recommended that the three areas amalgamate. All three councils were rated as weak to moderate in terms of financial sustainability, and the three areas were believed to form a collective community of interest with the town of Barcaldine serving as a regional centre with commercial facilities and an airport. All three councils opposed the amalgamation, with Aramac putting an alternate suggestion together with the Shire of Winton. On 15 March 2008, the three Shires formally ceased to exist, and elections were held on the same day to elect councillors and a mayor to the Regional Council.

On 22 November 2019 the Queensland Government decided to amalgamate the localities in the Barcaldine Region, resulting in five expanded localities based on the larger towns:

- Alpha, absorbing Beaufort, Drummondslope, Dunrobin (south-eastern corner), Hobartville (north-eastern part), Pine Hill, Port Wine, Sedgeford, Surbiton
- Aramac, absorbing Cornish Creek (eastern part), Dunrobin (south-western corner), Galilee, Garfield (western corner), Ibis, Ingberry (northern part), Pelican Creek, Sardine (eastern part), Upland, Upper Cornish Creek
- Barcaldine, absorbing Barcaldine Downs, Evora, Grant (bulk), Home Creek, Ingberry (southern part), Moombria, Narbethong (bulk), Patrick, Saltern Creek, Tara Station
- Jericho, absorbing Dunrobin (bulk), Garfield (bulk), Grant (eastern corner), Hobartville (south-western part), Mexico, Narbethong (north-east corner)
- Muttaburra, absorbing Bangall, Cornish Creek (western part), Sardine (western part), Tablederry

== Wards ==
The council is undivided, with six councillors and a mayor serving the whole region.

== Towns and localities ==
The Barcaldine Region includes the following settlements:

Barcaldine area:

- Barcaldine
- Alice
- Barcaldine Downs
- Evora
- Grant
- Home Creek
- Moombria
- Narbethong
- Patrick
- Saltern Creek
- Tara Station

Aramac area:

- Aramac
- Bangall
- Cornish Creek
- Galilee
- Ibis
- Ingberry
- Muttaburra
- Pelican Creek
- Sardine
- Tablederry
- Upland
- Upper Cornish Creek

Jericho area:

- Alpha
- Jericho
- Beaufort
- Drummondslope
- Dunrobin
- Garfield
- Hobartville
- Mexico
- Pine Hill
- Port Wine
- Sedgeford
- Surbiton

== Mayors ==
2008–2020 : Rob Chandler

2020–present: Sean Micheal Dillion

== Demographics ==
The populations given relate to the component entities prior to 2008. The 2011 census was the first for the new Region.

Year	Population (Total)	(Barcaldine)	(Aramac)	(Jericho)
1933	5,905	2,612	1,679	1,614
1947	5,218	2,147	1,592	1,479
1954	5,514	2,200	1,714	1,600
1961	5,797	2,384	1,790	1,623
1966	5,435	2,282	1,652	1,501
1971	4,456	1,868	1,168	1,420
1976	4,059	1,780	1,059	1,220
1981	4,042	1,783	1,082	1,177
1986	3,981	1,779	1,097	1,105
1991	3,762	1,813	832	1,117
1996	3,594	1,850	778	966
2001	3,536	1,773	742	1,021
2006	3,264	1,818	754	920
2011	3,215			
2016	2,865			
2021	2,849			

== Services ==
In cooperation with Rural Libraries Queensland, Barcaldine Regional Council operate libraries in Alpha, Aaramac, Barcaldine (headquarters), Jericho, and Muttaburra.
