= Thomson River (Queensland) =

River in Queensland, Australia

Thomson
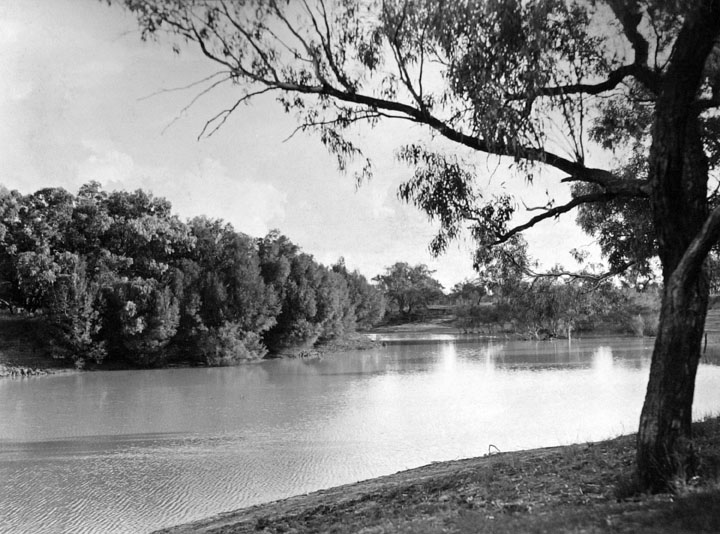
- Longreach, 1938

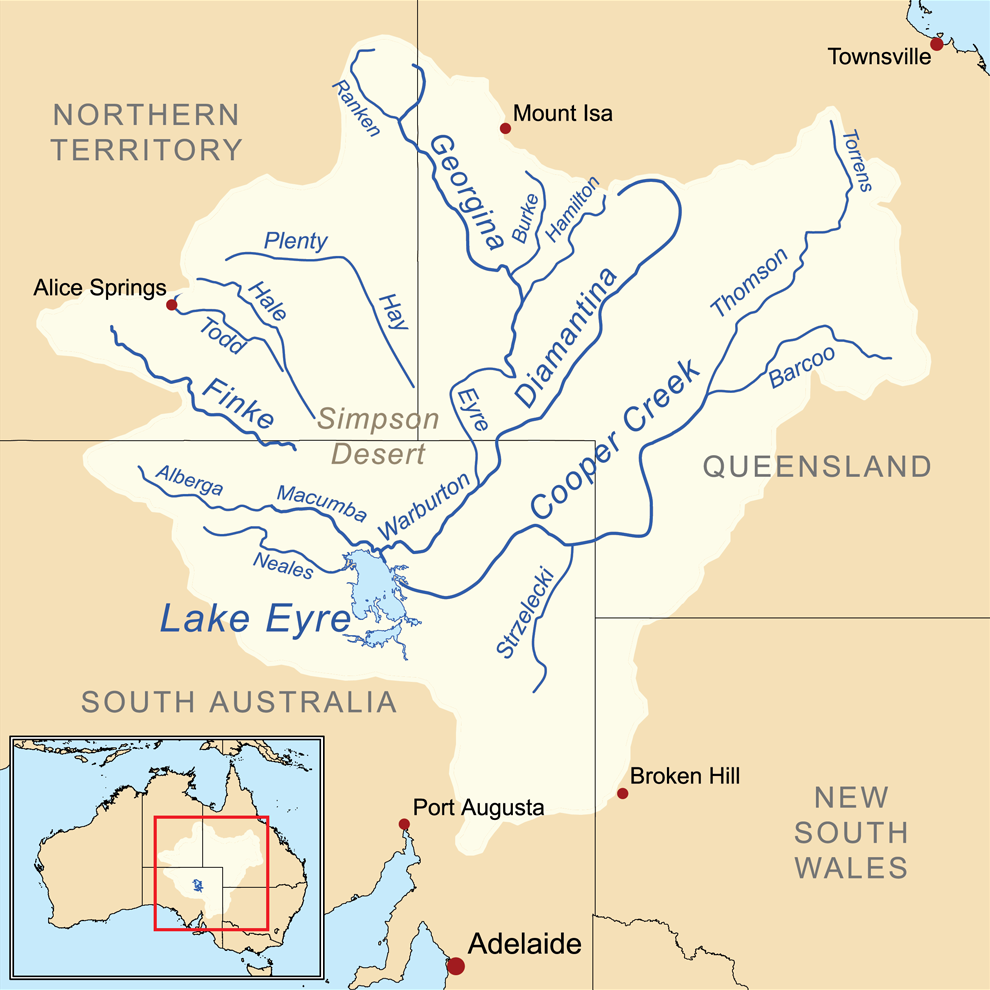
- Map of the Lake Eyre Basin showing Thomson River
- Etymology: Sir Edward Deas Thomson KCMG, CMG

Location
- Country: Australia
- State: Queensland
- Region: Central West Queensland, Western Queensland
- City: Longreach

Physical characteristics
- Source: Alma Range, Great Dividing Range
  - location: north of Muttaburra
  - elevation: 215 m (705 ft)
- Mouth: confluence with the Barcoo River to form Cooper Creek
  - coordinates: 25°10′2″S 142°53′24″E
  - elevation: 130 m (430 ft)
- Length: 350 km (220 mi)

Basin features
- River system: Lake Eyre Basin
- Tributaries
  - right: Landsborough Creek, Darr River

The Thomson River is a perennial river that forms part of the Lake Eyre Basin, situated in the central west and western regions of Queensland, Australia. Much of the course of the river comprises a series of narrow channels synonymous with the Channel Country and the Galilee subregion.

The river was named in 1847 by the explorer, Edmund Kennedy, in honour of The Hon. Sir Edward Deas Thomson KCMG, CMG, the Colonial Secretary of New South Wales at the time of discovery.

== History ==
Kuungkari (also known as Kungkari and Koonkerri) is a language of Western Queensland. The Kuungkari language region includes the landscape within the local government boundaries of Longreach Shire Council and Blackall-Tambo Shire Council.

== Course and features ==
Draining the Alma Range, part of the western slopes of the Great Dividing Range, the northernmost headwaters of the river begin as Torrens Creek, inland from Charters Towers. The watercourse becomes the Thomson just north of the town of Muttaburra, where the channels of Landsborough River, Towerhill Creek and Cornish Creek meet. Aramac Creek joins the river from the east, at Camoola south of Muttaburra and Maneroo Creek flows from the west, joining the Thomson south of Longreach. Just to the west of Longreach the river is crossed by the Landsborough Highway.

The river continues in a south westerly direction, passing the towns of Longreach, Stonehenge and Jundah, before reaching its confluence with the Barcoo River, 40 km north of Windorah, to form Cooper Creek. This is the only place in the world where the confluence of two rivers form a creek. From source to mouth, the Thomson is joined by 41 named tributaries over its 350 km (210 miles) course.

As with all of the rivers in the Lake Eyre Basin, the waters of the Thomson never reach the sea, and instead either evaporate, or, in exceptional flood, empty into Lake Eyre. Floods are relatively common within the catchment because of the summer monsoon rains. Due to the flat nature of the country traversed, the river can then become many kilometres wide. For much of the time, however, the river does not flow, and becomes a line of billabongs, of which fifteen are named.

The area through which the river flows is semi-arid blacksoil plains. The main industries of the area are sheep and beef cattle.

== See also ==
- Great Artesian Basin
- Lake Galilee (Queensland)
- List of rivers of Australia
- Rivers of Queensland
- Bradfield Scheme, proposed water management scheme involving the Thomson River
