= Capricorn Highway =

Highway in Queensland, Australia

Capricorn Highway Queensland

General information
- Type: Highway
- Length: 575 km (357 mi)
- Route number(s): A4; (Entire Route); Duplexes: A7; (Emerald – Emerald East)
- Former route number: National Route 66

Major junctions
- West end: Landsborough Highway (National Highway A2), Barcaldine
- Gregory Highway (State Highway A7); Leichhardt Highway (State Highway A5)
- East end: Bruce Highway (Queensland Highway A1), Rockhampton

Location(s)
- Major settlements: Jericho, Alpha, Emerald, Blackwater, Gogango, Westwood

Highway system
- Highways in Australia; National Highway • Freeways in Australia; Highways in Queensland

The Capricorn Highway is located in Central Queensland, Australia, and links the city of Rockhampton with western Queensland. The highway is 575 kilometres (357 mi) long, and joins the Landsborough Highway at Barcaldine. Formerly National Route 66, Queensland began to convert to the alphanumeric system much of Australia had adopted in the early-2000s and is now designated as A4. The highway runs parallel with the Tropic of Capricorn, hence its name.

Other towns situated along the highway include (from east to west): Gracemere, Kabra, Stanwell, Westwood, Gogango, Duaringa, Dingo, Bluff, Blackwater, Comet, Emerald, Bogantungan, Alpha and Jericho.

Running virtually east/west, the highway traverses the area known as the Central Highlands, and crosses the Great Dividing Range between Alpha and Jericho.

Capricorn Highway (green on black)

== State-controlled road ==
Capricorn Highway is a state-controlled state-strategic road. It is defined in four sections, as follows:

- Number 16A, Rockhampton to Duaringa.
- Number 16B, Duaringa to Emerald.
- Number 16C, Emerald to Alpha.
- Number 16D, Alpha to Barcaldine.

== Northern Australia Roads Program upgrade ==
The Northern Australia Roads Program announced in 2016 included the following project for the Capricorn Highway.

=== Highway duplication ===
The project to duplicate the section between Rockhampton and Gracemere was completed in mid 2021 at a total cost of $75 million. This will facilitate the construction of the south-western entry to the proposed Rockhampton Ring Road.

== Northern Australian Beef Roads Upgrade ==
The Northern Australia Beef Roads Program announced in 2016 included the following project:

=== Road train access to Rockhampton (stage 2) ===
The project for upgrading between Gracemere saleyards and the Rockhampton abattoirs to provide access for Type 1 Road Trains was completed by early 2021 at a total cost of $30 million. It involved about 29 kilometres (18 mi) of road improvements on four roads:

- Capricorn Highway – from Saleyards Road at Gracemere to the Bruce Highway roundabout at Rochhampton (7.7 kilometres (4.8 mi)).
- Bruce Highway – from the Capricorn Highway roundabout to the Yaamba Road intersection (8.3 kilometres (5.2 mi)).
- Rockhampton–Yeppoon Road – from the Bruce Highway intersection south-west to the Emu Park Road intersection (2.4 kilometres (1.5 mi).
- Rockhampton–Emu Park Road – from the Rockhampton-Yeppoon Road intersection to St Christophers Chapel Road at Nerimbera (10.2 kilometres (6.3 mi)).

== Roads of strategic importance upgrades ==
The Roads of Strategic Importance initiative, last updated in March 2022, included the following projects for the Capricorn Highway.

=== Corridor upgrade ===
A lead project to upgrade the Mount Isa to Rockhampton corridor, including sections of the Capricorn and Landsborough Highways and surrounding state and council roads, at an estimated cost of $237.5 million, was in the planning and scoping stage. Works are expected to include progressive sealing, lane duplications and crossing upgrades.

=== Intersection upgrade Gregory Highway ===
A project to upgrade the intersection with the Gregory Highway in Emerald at a cost of $7.9 million is scheduled for completion in mid-2023. This project was targeted for "early works" by the Queensland Government.

== Other upgrades ==
=== Intersection upgrade ===
A project to upgrade an intersection in Blackwater, at a cost of $6.24 million, was expected to finish in early 2022.

=== Pavement strengthening and/or widening ===
A project to strengthen and widen pavement just east of Emerald, at a cost of $5 million, was expected to finish in mid-2022.

A project to widen pavement east of Alpha, at a cost of $9.65 million, was due for completion in late 2022.

== Major intersections ==
LGA	Location	km	mi	Destinations	Notes
Barcaldine	Barcaldine	0	0.0	Landsborough Highway (National Route A2) west – Longreach / south – Blackall	Western end of Capricorn Highway
Central Highlands	Emerald	309	192	Gregory Highway (State Route A7) north – Clermont	Western concurrency terminus with Gregory Highway
Central Highlands	Emerald	311	193	Gregory Highway (State Route A7) south – Springsure	Eastern concurrency terminus with Gregory Highway
Central Highlands	Dingo	432	268	Fitzroy Developmental Road (State Route 67) north – Middlemount	
Rockhampton	Westwood	522.9	324.9	Leichhardt Highway (State Route A5) south – Banana and Biloela	
Rockhampton	Rockhampton	574.6	357.0	Bruce Highway (Queensland Highway A1) north – Rockhampton / south – Mount Larcom	Eastern end of Capricorn Highway. Intersection is approximately 4.1 km from Rockhampton CBD
1.000 mi = 1.609 km; 1.000 km = 0.621 mi: Concurrency terminus

== Intersecting state-controlled roads ==
In addition to the Bruce, Leichhardt, Gregory and Landsborough Highways, and the Fitzroy Developmental Road, the following state-controlled roads, from east to west, intersect with the Capricorn Highway:

- Gavial–Gracemere Road
- Biloela–Duaringa Road
- Duaringa Connection Road
- Blackwater–Rolleston Road
- Blackwater–Cooroorah Road
- Comet River Road
- Anakie–Sapphire Road
- Alpha–Tambo Road
- Clermont–Alpha Road
- Blackall–Jericho Road
- Barcaldine–Aramac Road

=== Biloela–Duaringa Road ===
Biloela–Duaringa Road
- Location: Capricorn Highway, Gainsford to Don River crossing, Gainsford / Kokotungo boundary
- Length: 24.3 km (15.1 mi)

Biloela–Duaringa Road is a state-controlled district road (number 462), rated as a local road of regional significance (LRRS). It runs from the Capricorn Highway in Gainsford to the Don River crossing on the Gainsford / Kokotungo boundary, a distance of 24.3 kilometres (15.1 mi). It does not intersect with any other state-controlled roads. The physical road continues south as Kokotungo–Don River Road.

=== Blackwater–Cooroorah Road ===
Blackwater–Cooroorah Road
- Location: Capricorn Highway, Blackwater to Coronado Curragh Mine, Blackwater
- Length: 15.5 km (9.6 mi)

Blackwater–Cooroorah Road is a state-controlled district road (number 513), rated as a local road of regional significance (LRRS). It runs from the Capricorn Highway in Blackwater to the Coronado Curragh Mine in Blackwater, a distance of 15.5 kilometres (9.6 mi). It does not intersect with any other state-controlled roads. The physical road continues north.

=== Comet River Road ===
Comet River Road
- Location: Capricorn Highway, Comet to Comet–Rolleston Road, Togara
- Length: 22.5 km (14.0 mi)

Comet River Road is a state-controlled district road (number 4607), rated as a local road of regional significance (LRRS). It runs from the Capricorn Highway in Comet to the northern boundary of Togara, where it becomes Comet–Rolleston Road, a distance of 22.5 kilometres (14.0 mi). It does not intersect with any other state-controlled roads.

=== Anakie–Sapphire Road ===
Anakie–Sapphire Road
- Location: Bon Accord Road, Anakie Siding to Rubyvale Road, Sapphire Central
- Length: 11.1 km (6.9 mi)

Anakie–Sapphire Road is a state-controlled district road (number 5501), rated as a local road of regional significance (LRRS). It runs from Bon Accord Road in Anakie Siding, across the Capricorn Highway, to Rubyvale Road in Sapphire Central, a distance of 11.1 kilometres (6.9 mi). It does not intersect with any other state-controlled roads.

=== Alpha–Tambo Road ===
Alpha–Tambo Road
- Location: Capricorn Highway, Alpha to Dawson Developmental Road, Windeyer
- Length: 121 km (75 mi)

Alpha–Tambo Road is a state-controlled district road (number 443), rated as a local road of regional significance (LRRS). It runs from the Capricorn Highway in Alpha to the Dawson Developmental Road in Windeyer, a distance of 121 kilometres (75 mi). It does not intersect with any other state-controlled roads.

== See also ==
- Highways in Australia
- List of highways in Queensland
