= Jericho, Queensland =

Jericho
- Town
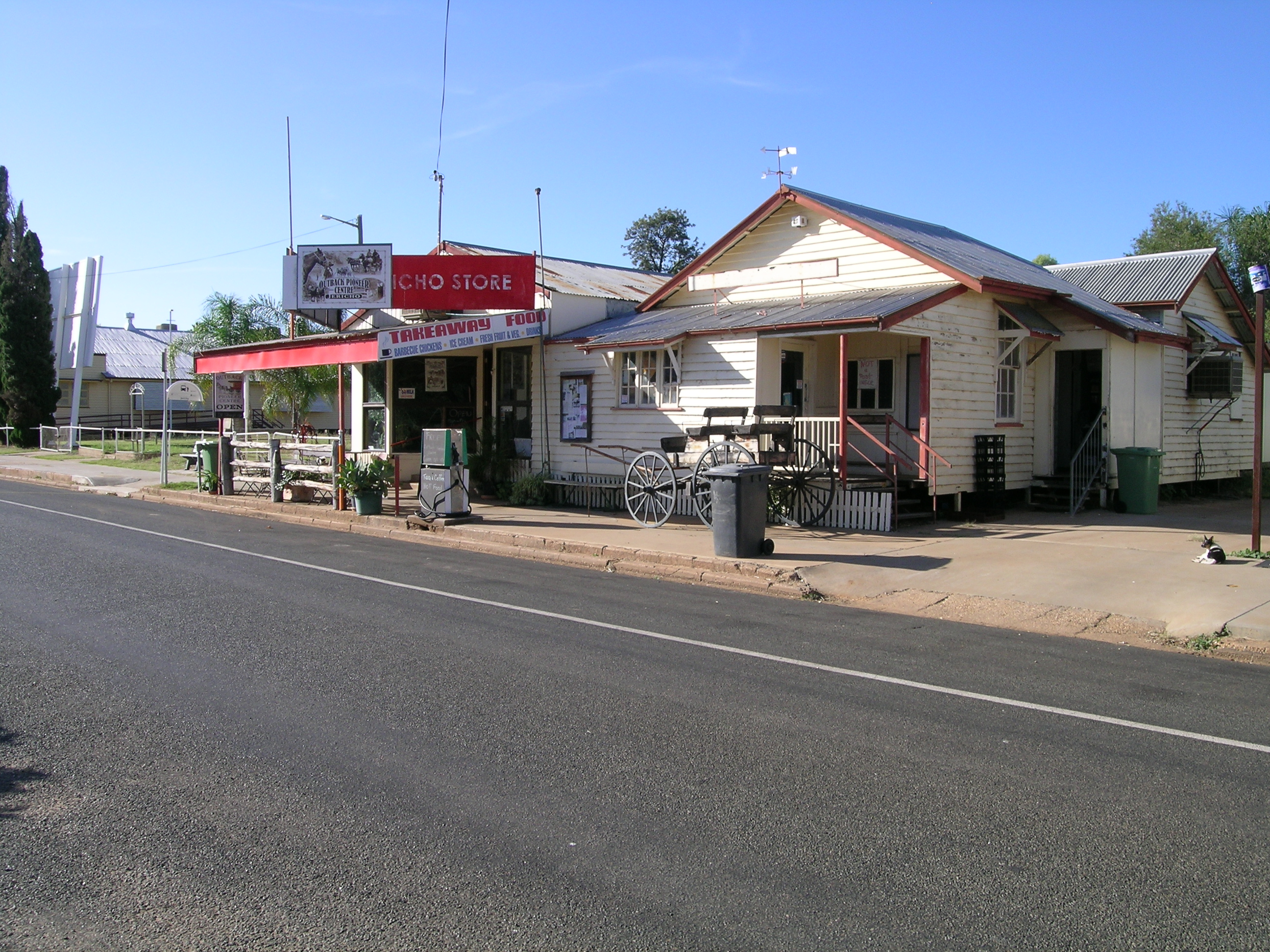
- The main street

- Interactive map of Jericho
- Coordinates: 23.605°S 146.1258°E
- Country: Australia
- State: Queensland
- LGA: Barcaldine Region
- Location: 86.8 km (53.9 mi) E of Barcaldine; 222 km (138 mi) W of Emerald; 493 km (306 mi) W of Rockhampton; 1,056 km (656 mi) NW of Brisbane

Government
  - State electorate: Gregory
  - Federal division: Maranoa

Area
  - Total: 86.4 km^{2} (33.4 sq mi)
- Elevation: 352 m (1,155 ft)

Population
  - Total: 229 (2021 census)
  - Density: 2.650/km^{2} (6.865/sq mi)
- Time zone: UTC+10:00 (AEST)
- Postcode: 4728
Localities around Jericho
| Aramac | Laglan | Laglan |
| Barcaldine | Jericho | Alpha |
| Barcaldine | Blackall | Alpha |

Jericho is a rural town and locality in the Barcaldine Region, Queensland, Australia. In the 2021 census, the locality of Jericho had a population of 229 people.

== Geography ==
Jericho is in Central West Queensland. The town is centrally located in the south of its locality. The Capricorn Highway traverses the locality from west (Garfield/Mexico) to east (Hobartville/Mexico), passing through the town on Darwin Street. The Blackall–Jericho Road commences at the town and exits the locality via the south (Mexico).

The Central Western railway passes through the town and locality, immediately to the south of the highway to the west of the town and immediately to the north of the highway to the east of the town. The town is served by the Jericho railway station on Darwin Street (23.6018°S 146.1258°E).

Lagoon Creek rises north of the town and exits the locality to the north-east (Garfield). Jordan Creek enters the locality from the south (Mexico), passes to the immediate east of the town and splits into two branches north of the town, both of which exit the locality to the north (Garfield). All of these watercourses become tributaries to the Alice River in Garfield and contribute to the Lake Eyre drainage basin.

The principal land use outside of the town is grazing on native vegetation.

== History ==
The first exploration by Europeans was by Major Thomas Mitchell who passed through the area in 1846. By the 1850s, settlers had moved in.

The Jordan Creek/River (as it is variously known) was named after Harry Jordan, an early settler in the area.

The town and locality name are derived from the railway station, which had been named Jericho in 1885 by railway surveyor and engineer Willoughby Hannam in a reference to the Biblical town of Jericho being to the west of the Jordan River, since it was the first station to the west of Jordan Creek. The Central Western railway was opened to Jericho on 8 June 1885.

Jericho Post Office opened on 2 July 1885; a receiving office had been open from 1884.

Jericho State School opened on 20 February 1888.

Jericho Methodist Church opened in October 1930. It became the Jericho Uniting Church following the merger of many Methodist, Presbyterian and Congregational churches into the Uniting Church in Australia in 1977, but closed subsequently and is now in private ownership. It was at 15 Davy Street (23.6058°S 146.1246°E).

In December 2010, half of the town's houses were inundated by floods.

On 22 November 2019 the Queensland Government decided to amalgamate the localities in the Barcaldine Region, resulting in five expanded localities based on the larger towns: Alpha, Aramac, Barcaldine, Jericho and Muttaburra. Jericho was expanded to incorporate Dunrobin (all except the south-west corner), Garfield (all except the western corner), Grant (eastern corner), Hobartville (south-western part), Mexico, and Narbethong (north-east corner).

== Demographics ==
In the 2011 census, Jericho and the surrounding region had a population of 369 people.

In the 2016 census, the locality of Jericho had a population of 115 people.

In the 2021 census, the locality of Jericho had a population of 229 people.

== Facilities ==
Jericho has a drive-in theatre, park, swimming pool, town hall and showground.

Barcaldine Regional Council operates a library at 6 Darwin Street inside the Tourist Information Centre.

The Jericho branch of the Queensland Country Women's Association has its rooms at 7 Faraday Street.

== Education ==
Jericho State School is a government primary (Prep-6) school for boys and girls at Pasteur Street (23.6042°S 146.1294°E). In 2017, the school had an enrolment of 9 students with 1 teacher and 4 non-teaching staff (2 full-time equivalent).

There are no secondary schools in Jericho. The nearest government secondary school is Alpha State School (to Year 10) in neighbouring Alpha to the east. However, most parts of Jericho are too distant to attend this school; the alternatives are distance education and boarding school.

== Tourist attractions ==
The Crystal Trumpeters monument and the statue of Joshua made of barbed wire are both located within Jericho.
