= Alpha, Queensland =

Alpha
- Town
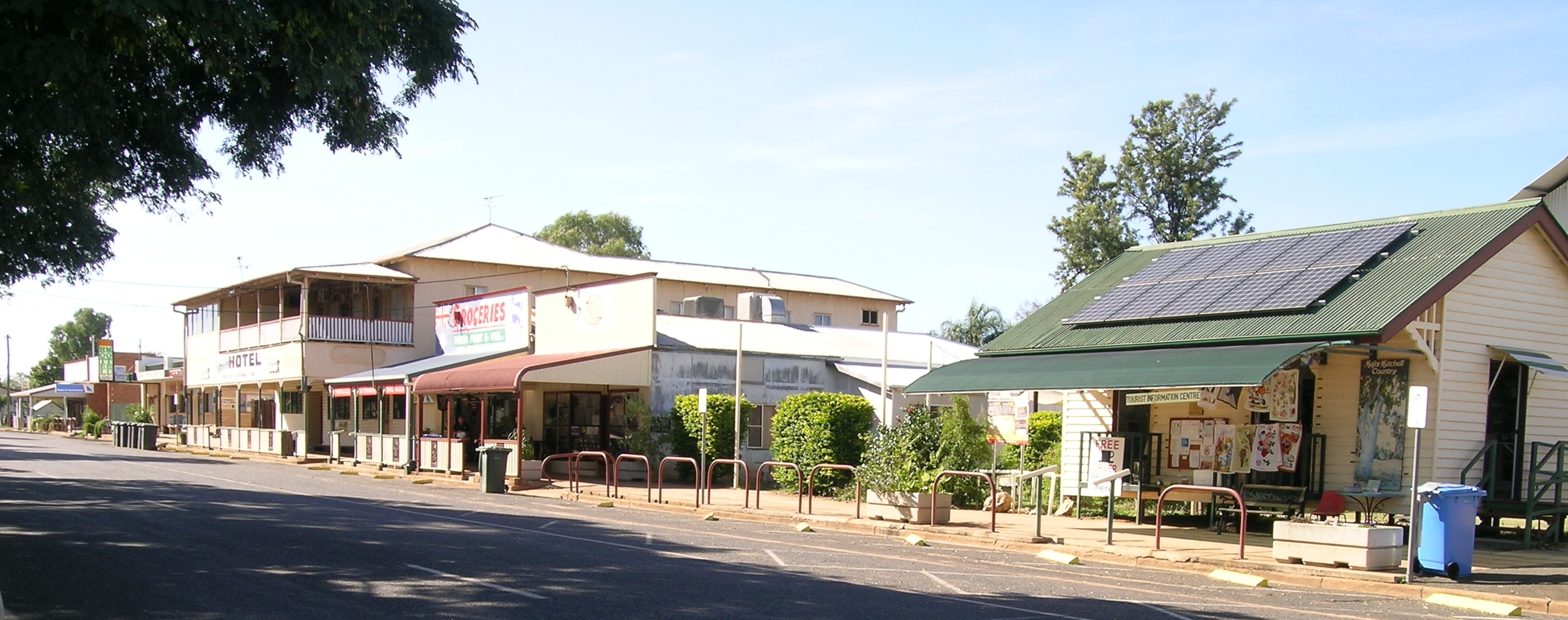
- The main street of Alpha

- Interactive map of Alpha
- Coordinates: 23.6519°S 146.6383°E
- Country: Australia
- State: Queensland
- LGA: Barcaldine Region
- Location: 144 km (89 mi) E of Barcaldine; 168 km (104 mi) W of Emerald; 438 km (272 mi) W of Rockhampton; 999 km (621 mi) NW of Brisbane

Government
  - State electorate: Gregory
  - Federal division: Maranoa

Area
  - Total: 203.4 km^{2} (78.5 sq mi)

Population
  - Total: 559 (2021 census)
  - Density: 2.7483/km^{2} (7.118/sq mi)
- Time zone: UTC+10:00 (AEST)
- Postcode: 4724
Localities around Alpha
Jericho	Laglan; Clermont	Quetta; Peak Vale
Jericho	Alpha	Willows
Blackall	Windeyer; Mantuan Downs	Lochington

Alpha is a rural town and a locality in the Barcaldine Region, Queensland, Australia. In the 2021 census, the locality of Alpha had a population of 559 people.

== Geography ==
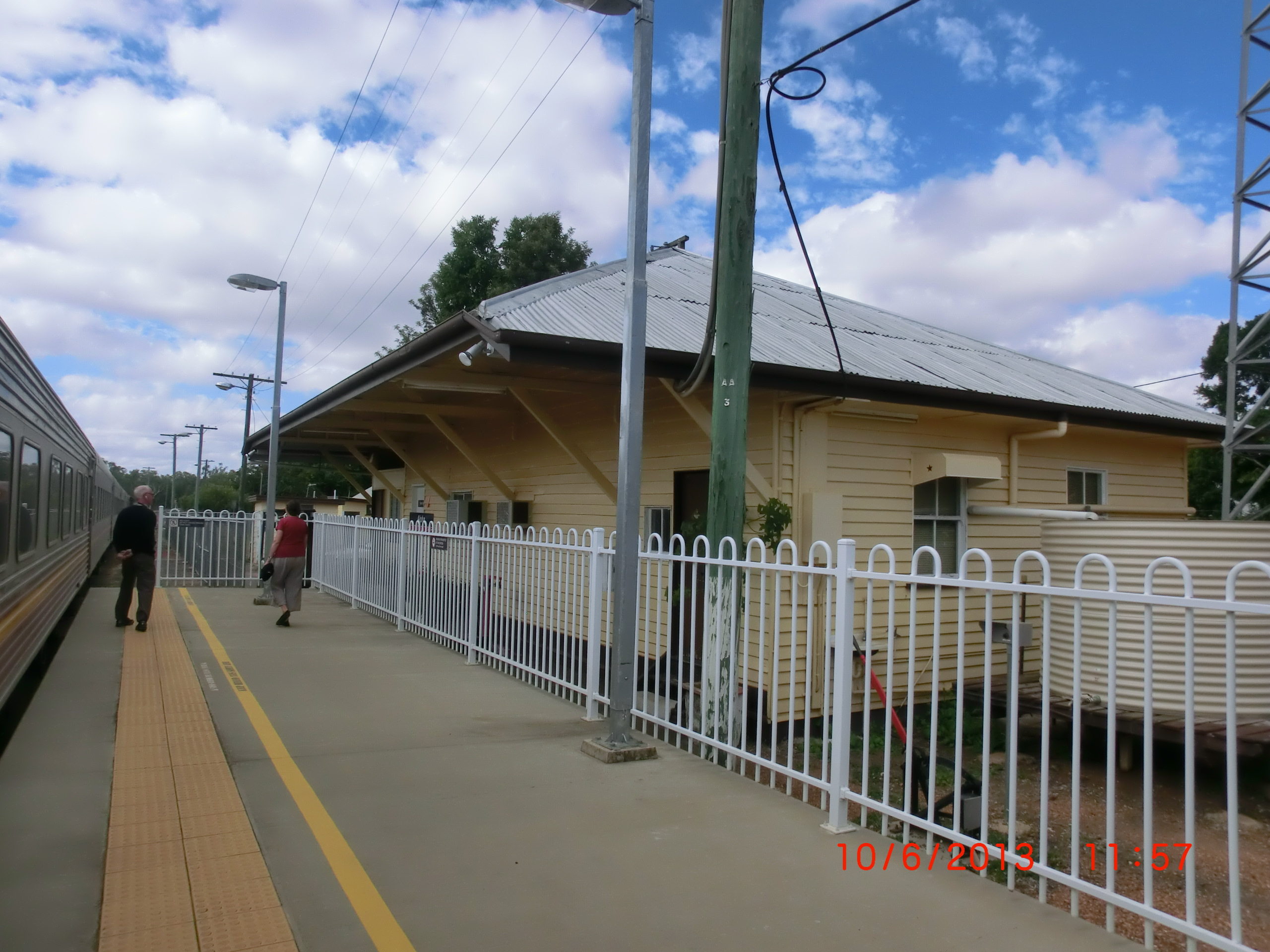
Alpha railway station, 2013

Alpha is in Central West Queensland. It lies on Alpha Creek.

The Capricorn Highway runs through from east to west, and the Clermont-Alpha Road enters from the north-east.

The Central Western railway line passes through the town, which is served by Alpha railway station.

The town is a service centre for the surrounding pastoral properties and travellers on the highway.

== History ==
The town of Alpha is situated approximately 400 kilometres to the west of Rockhampton, with the name being derived from Alpha Pastoral Station, established in 1863. This was a very large station, dominating the area and growing to more than 1,600 square kilometres by the 1890s.

The area was originally visited and partly explored by the New South Wales Surveyor-General, Thomas Mitchell, in 1846 and it was his reports that were to encourage settlement, particularly from the 1860s. Early European settlers to move into the region included Robert Donaldson and Agnes Adelaide Donaldson.

Alpha was initially established as a temporary terminus during construction of the Central Western railway line (then known as the Great Northern line, a name that would be subsequently assigned to the subsequent more northern line west of Townsville to Mount Isa), which was being built westwards from Rockhampton. The major coastal centre was keen to take full advantage of the inland pastoral wealth being generated and pushed for a central railway line. Construction commenced in 1867, reaching Emerald in 1879 and was opened to Alpha on 22 September 1884. The construction camp continued moving west, but a township remained at the former terminus. Until June 1990, Queensland Rail maintained a locomotive depot in the town.

Alpha Provisional School opened on 30 August 1886. It became Alpha State School on 7 September 1894. A preschool centre was added in 1987.

A United Protestant Church opened in March 1894.

A Catholic church opened in 1899.

Three Sisters of St Joseph of the Sacred Heart arrived by train in Alpha on Thursday 15 May 1902. The Sisters operated a temporary Catholic primary school in the church in 1902. A convent with school boarding facilities was established in 1904 and was officially opened by Bishop Higgins in June 1904. In November 1904, the pupils presented a successful concert for a large crowd. St Joseph's Convent School gained its own building, offiicially opened by Bishop Shiel in November 1918. It was erected at a cost of £820. When the convent became dangerously riddled with white ants in 1922, it was replaced by a single storey building.

In November 1950, Alpha was inundated with flood water and the Sisters were forced to leave their convent and shelter in the top floor of the school. To reach it they carried provisions and a primus stove in buckets on their heads and waded through waist deep water.

The Golden Jubilee was celebrated in 1952 with musical items and a three-act operetta, as well as a visit from Rev. Mother Pierre, head of St Joseph Order of Nuns in Queensland.

The older school building was replaced by another two-storey building 12 years later. The new school of St. Joseph's of Alpha, was opened by Francis Rush, Bishop of Rockhampton on June 12, 1963. It was constructed by local builders. Brownjohn and Johnson and supervised by Fr. W Collins at a cost of about 10,000 pounds and is now a private residence.

Before the Sisters left Alpha for the last time in December 1977, their 75 years of service in the community was celebrated. Many nuns had spent time in Alpha and were remembered by past pupils with respect and affection. A roll call of past pupils was answered by representatives of each decade including three names from the 1902–10 period. St Joseph's convent continued for two years under instruction from lay teachers, Michael & Irene Watkins; but by the end of 1979, only about 25 students remained and it closed altogether.

The Sisters of St Joseph were central to the development of a musical culture in Alpha. The basis was their teaching of practice and theory in pianoforte and violin, as well as singing. Pupils sat yearly for examinations from the London College of Music, Trinity College, London or the Australian Music Examination Board, many passing with honours.

Children travelled many miles to receive regular music instruction from the Nuns. Seven decades of music instruction provided the foundation for many concerts. The Golden Jubilee concert featured a choir, singing by individuals. duets, trios and groups, recitations, dance and comedy. Adults as well as the children performed.

Another impact of the music classes were years of dance music played by local people at debutante balls, shows, rodeos and fancy-dress balls, which continued long after St Joseph's School closed.

Jericho Shire, which included the town, was incorporated in 1917, with the main shire offices and council facilities located in the town of Jericho.

Killarney Park Provisional School opened in late 1918 as a half time provisional school in conjunction with Glenleigh Provisional School (meaning there was one teacher shared between the two schools). Both schools closed in late 1919 or early 1920 due to low student numbers.

On 8 April 1941, two people were killed when a goods train from Emerald plunged through a section of the wooden rail bridge over Alpha Creek on approach to the Alpha railway station.

On 22 November 2019, the Queensland Government decided to amalgamate the localities in the Barcaldine Region, resulting in five expanded localities based on the larger towns: Alpha, Aramac, Barcaldine, Jericho and Muttaburra. Alpha was expanded to incorporate Beaufort, Drummondslope, Dunrobin (south-eastern corner), Hobartville (north-eastern part), Pine Hill, Port Wine, Sedgeford, and Surbiton.

== Demographics ==
In the 2006 census, the town of Alpha had a population of 402 people.

In the 2011 census, the locality of Alpha had a population of 571 people.

In the 2016 census, the locality of Alpha had a population of 335 people.,

In the 2021 census, the locality of Alpha had a population of 559 people.

== Mining ==
On 29 May 2012 the first mine proposed to be developed in the Galilee Basin, known as the Alpha Coal Project, which is a joint development of Indian conglomerate GVK and Hancock Coal, was approved by the Government of Queensland.

Waratah Coal is planning to develop a new mine close to the town called the China First Coal Project. This mine is to be built on the Bimblebox nature refuge which is home to the endangered black-throated finch.

Waratah Coal's China First Project 2011 Environmental Impact Statement admits that there would be a range of both positive and negative effects on Alpha, and that they would "cause irreversible change to the physical landscape and the social fabric of towns." But it concludes that the development of mines in the vicinity of Alpha presents a unique opportunity for the town and surrounding communities to benefit from sustainable and socially acceptable development.

Bimblebox, a feature-length documentary directed by Michael C O'Connell (Mountaintop Removal), explores the "China First" mega mine project being developed by Waratah Coal close to the town of Alpha in the Galilee basin. The film also examines opposition to the China First mine from the owners of the Bimblebox nature refuge which stands in the path of the proposed project. In a 20 March 2012 press conference Waratah coal CEO Clive Palmer accused environmental groups and the film's producers of being funded by the Central Intelligence Agency.

The 8000 hectare property of Bimblebox Nature Refuge was gazetted in 2003 at the height of a panic clearing event during the tree-clearing debate in Queensland during the Beattie government administration. Land clearing rates were among the largest in the world at the time. The vegetation of the 7 million hectare desert uplands bioregion which was mostly untouched was the next logical area to be cleared following the decimation of the brigalow belt under the Fitzoy Land Development Scheme (Brigalow land development scheme) through the decades prior.

== Education ==
Alpha State School is a government primary and secondary (Prep–10) school for boys and girls at 11 Milton Street (23.6507°S 146.6422°E). In 2017, the school had an enrolment of 40 students with 8 teachers and 10 non-teaching staff (6 full-time equivalent). In 2018, the school had an enrolment of 39 students with 10 teachers and 11 non-teaching staff (6 full-time equivalent).

The nearest government secondary schools to Year 12 are in Barcaldine 140 kilometres (87 mi) to the west and Emerald 169 kilometres (105 mi) to the east. Alternatively, there is distance education and boarding schools. Alpha State School provides support to students studying Years 11 and 12 by distance education.

== Amenities ==
Alpha has a tourism information centre, golf course, art gallery, showground, Racecourse, parks, swimming pool, tennis courts, museum, hardware store, newsagents, bank, pub, grocery store, butcher, baker, post office, BP, Caltex, craft shop, hairdresser, pharmacy, hospital, police station and fire station.

Barcaldine Regional Council operates a library at the Alpha town hall on Tennyson Street.

Alpha Uniting Church is at 25 Milton Street (23.6500°S 146.6392°E).

The Alpha branch of the Queensland Country Women's Association meets at the Uniting Church Hall at 4724 Milton Street.
