= Muttaburra =

- Town
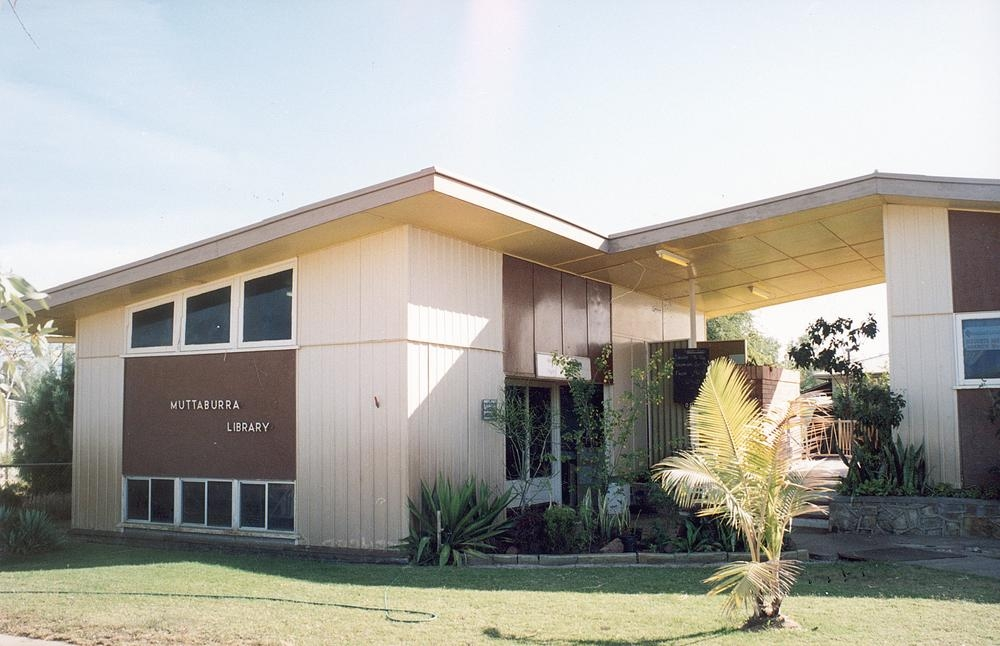
- Muttaburra Library

- Interactive map of Muttaburra
- Coordinates: 22.5944°S 144.5469°E
- Country: Australia
- State: Queensland
- LGA: Barcaldine Region
- Location: 121 km (75 mi) NNE of Longreach; 152 km (94 mi) NW of Barcaldine; 731 km (454 mi) W of Rockhampton; 1,224 km (761 mi) NW of Brisbane
- Established: 1878

Government
  - State electorate: Gregory
  - Federal division: Maranoa

Area
  - Total: 6,314.2 km^{2} (2,437.9 sq mi)
- Elevation: 21 m (69 ft)

Population
  - Total: 158 (2021 census)
  - Density: 0.02502/km^{2} (0.06481/sq mi)
- Time zone: UTC+10:00 (AEST)
- Postcode: 4732
Localities around Muttaburra
Corfield	Prairie	Aramac
Corfield	Muttaburra	Aramac
Longreach	Longreach	Ilfracombe

Muttaburra /ˈmʌtəbʌrə/ is an outback town and locality in the Barcaldine Region, Queensland, Australia. Muttaburra was the discovery site of the Muttaburrasaurus, one of Australia's most famous dinosaurs.

In the 2021 census, the locality of Muttaburra had a population of 158 people.

== Geography ==
Muttaburra is in the central west of Queensland. The town is located on the banks of the Thomson River, which is part of the Lake Eyre drainage basin. The Hughenden–Muttaburra Road enters from the north and exits as Muttaburra–Aramac Road to the east.

The region is with a sub-basin of the Great Artesian Basin. The Great Artesian Basin supplies water from bores to the towns of Muttaburra and Aramac. The area is well known for its good quality land that is used for sheep and cattle grazing. The main industry of the Muttaburra area is grazing.

The undeveloped town of Scarrbury is within the locality (22.9333°S 144.7000°E). Scarrbury is located on Aramac Creek along Vera Park Road.

== History ==
Muttaburra lay on the traditional tribal lands of the Iningai. Iningai (also known as Yiningay, Muttaburra, Tateburra, Yinangay, Yinangi) is an Australian Aboriginal language spoken by the Iningai people. The Iningai language region includes the landscape within the local government boundaries of the Longreach Region and Barcaldine Region, particularly the towns of Longreach, Barcaldine, Muttaburra and Aramac as well as the properties of Bowen Downs and catchments of Cornish Creek and Alice River.

The name of the town derived from an Iningai clan name, the Muttaburra, who were the traditional owners of this area. According to some sources, muttaburra meant "the meeting of waters" or "camping ground" or "meeting place". The area was once part of a vast inland sea.

Muttaburra developed as a town in the 1870s. In the Brisbane Courier of 10 October 1877, the local correspondent noted that,

"The Land Commissioner has been round this way lately, and surveyed the new township, one and a half-mile from Mount Cornish; its name I do not know, and I don’t think anybody else does, as it is undecided. I hear there is a store open now, also a public house, and I suppose there will be other business places shortly."

The town was officially declared in 1878. Bruford Street, the main street, took its name from a saddler, Mr. Bruford, who established a saddlery repair shop there, in that same year. The need for other services, such as hotels, the Cobb & Co changing station, blacksmiths, banks and general stores were also soon accommodated. 50 allotments of Crown Land were made available to the public for sale by public auction at Aramac on 18 June 1878, at which "Mr Sword, Land Commissioner, disposed of forty six town allotments situated at Muttaburra. They were one acre divisions, upset price £10. Twenty three fetched the upset price, the remainder sold at a considerable advance, two of the lots realising £50 each."

The first post office was built in 1887 and then replaced with a modern building in 1926.

In March 1881, the Queensland Government held a land sale, auctioning 60 town lots in the town of Scarrbury. The government had set aside 4 square miles (10 km^{2}) of land for the town in November 1876.

Muttaburra was also the scene of one of the most daring acts of cattle duffing ever performed in Australia. Henry Radford stole cattle from Bowen Downs Station and drove them 1,300 kilometres (810 mi) through the mostly unexplored Central Australia region to the Blanche Water station in northern South Australia. He sold the livestock for £5000, and was later charged with theft and tried at the Roma District Court. Despite overwhelming evidence from the prosecution and no witnesses put forward by the defence, a jury found him not guilty within an hour. He was greatly admired for crossing Central Australia unscathed. The transcript of the delivery of the verdict reads, "Judge: What is your verdict? Foreman of the Jury: We find the prisoner 'Not Guilty'. Judge: What? Foreman of the Jury: Not guilty. Judge: I thank God, gentlemen, that the verdict is yours, not mine!"

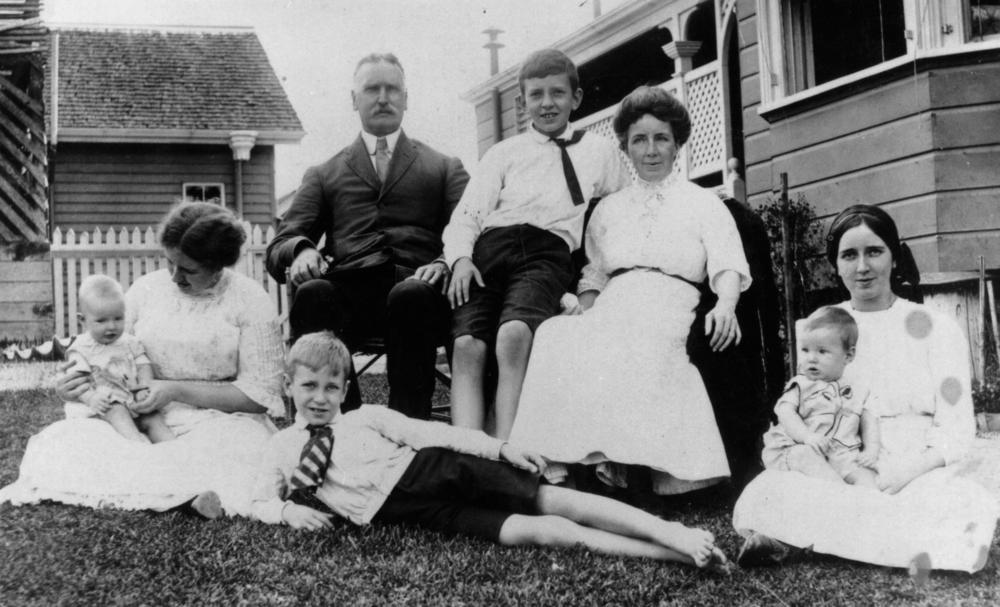
Family of George and Edwina Bunning, 1912, descendants of the Edkins family.

One of the prominent early settlers to establish themselves in Muttaburra was Edward Rowland (Rofley) Edkins, who was the first Manager of Mt. Cornish, the original outstation of Bowen Downs. He was also Chairman of the Aramac Divisional Board (1882, 1886 - 1888, 1891, and 1902); a member of the Muttaburra Hospital Committee (1885); Muttaburra Jockey Club President (1891); Muttaburra Hospital Committee President (1891); and Marathon Pastoral Society President (1891). He died at Drummoyne, Sydney, on 14 August 1905. Edkins married Edwina Marion Huey, daughter of Dr Walter Huey (1797-1843) of Launceston in Tasmania. Edwina was well known in the district, and also a composer of a number of musical works, related to the area, including Malboona Gavotte, Wee Bimba: waltz, The Women of the West and the LC5 Waltz She was remembered as "the most kindly of kind hostesses and the wife of one of the most outstanding men of the pastoral industry in Australia".

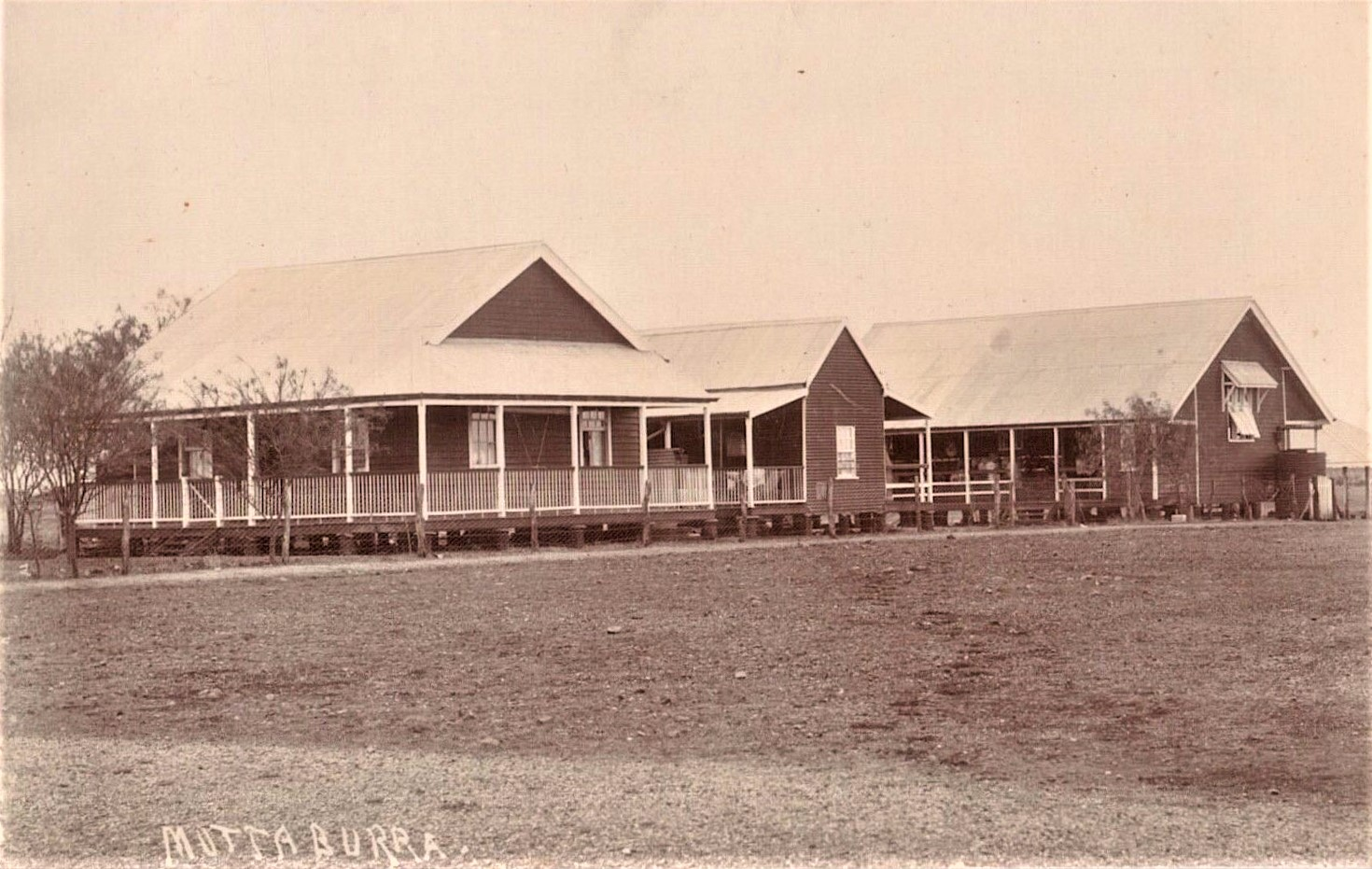
Muttaburra Hospital, 1913

In 1884, a hospital was built with funds raised by the local community. The first doctor was Dr Overend from Melbourne and Mr Lawry was the first Wardsman. By 1901, the Muttaburra Hospital was equipped with one of the earliest x-ray units to be installed in any country hospital. The Muttaburra Hospital closed in 1974 due to the small population.

Muttaburra State School is one of the oldest schools in the district. The school was opened on 18 February 1884 with an enrolment of 17. Its highest enrolment was 112 students in 1903. In 1937, the new school building and teacher's residence were completed. In 2009 at the school's 125th anniversary, a total of 1593 students had enrolled through its history.

The town dam was built in 1885 by Mr Hudson. For some years this dam was the source of water for the town and water carted into town in casks. Residents paid 2/6 per cask although double this amount was not uncommon. Later the dam was also used as the town's swimming pool.

St Joseph's Catholic Church was built in 1888. In 1943, it was destroyed by cyclone. A new church was built in 1948.

In May 1891, approximately 400 shearers camped near Muttaburra during the 1891 Australian shearers' strike. Union Hole is where the shearers drew water and carted it back to their camp by dray. There are still some remains of the campsite visible today.

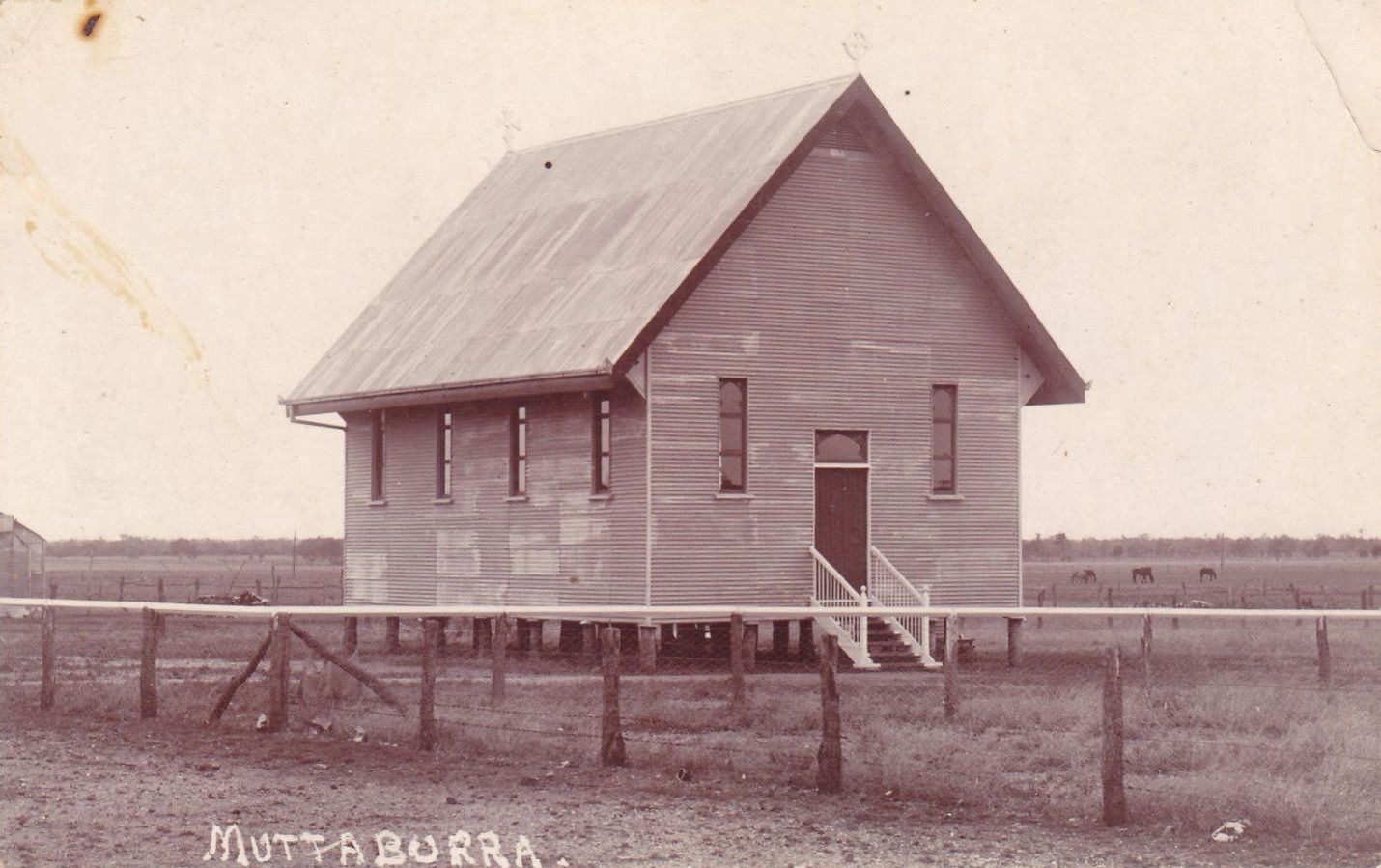
Anglican church, early 1900s

All Saints Anglican Church was built from corrugated iron in October 1903 by Mr Hack. It was opened and dedicated on Wednesday 18 November 1903 by Bishop of Rockhampton, Nathaniel Dawes. He confirmed 70 young people as part of the visit.

The Cassimatis Store opened in 1914 but was closed in 1978 having been a bank, green grocery, haberdashery, emporium, cafe, white goods merchant, and liquor store. In 1911, Andrew Andrew (A.A.) Cassimatis and his son George left the island of Kythira (which lies between Crete and the mainland of Greece) to come to Australia. They worked in Sydney and Bundaberg before establishing themselves in Muttaburra. They built their own general store in 1918, after renting local properties for a number of years. The Cassimatis became one of the oldest agents in Australia for Mobil Oil – Australia – previously known as The Vacuum Oil Company of Australia. They also bottled their own methylated spirits and kerosene, using their own label. George Cassimatis was a J.P. and Councillor representing Muttaburra on the Aramac Shire Council. He sat on various committees and played a significant role in the developmental history of Muttaburra. The store was reopened in 2001 after a full renovation. Fire destroyed the store in the morning of 6 January 2009. However the shop and service station has now been rebuilt by A. E. Rose Constructions (Peter Rose), and is open for business again. Originally a drover's cottage was situated alongside the family's general store; it was built in 1903 and purchased by George Cassimatis in 1934.

90 men and women from the Muttaburra district served in some capacity in the First World War. In 2015 a new memorial was designed and installed by J.H. Wagner & Sons. The front face of the memorial has three bronze sculpture badges for Australian Army, Australian Navy and Australian Air Force.

The Muttaburra branch of the Country Women's Association was formed in August 1927 with 34 financial members. The Ruby Bayliss QCWA Hostel opened in 1955 to provide accommodation for out-of-town expectant mothers.

Dr Joseph Arratta served for thirty-five years at the hospital in Muttaburra from 1925 to 1960. He was awarded an M.B.E. in 1959 in recognition of his service to medicine.

The Muttaburra Public Library building was opened in 1961.

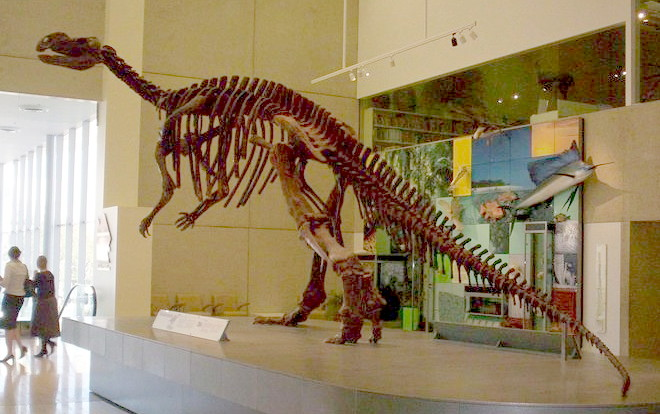
Muttaburrasaurus skeleton at Queensland Museum

In 1963, Muttaburra was the discovery site of the Muttaburrasaurus, one of Australia's most famous dinosaurs, by Doug Langdon. The dinosaur is believed to have been 12 metres (39 ft) long, 2 metres (6.6 ft) high from the hip and weighing 3 tonnes (3.3 short tons). It was a herbivore, with rows of grinding teeth, and probably ate plants such as ferns, cycads and conifers. It may have lived in herds. Muttaburrasaurus lived around 100 million years ago, during the Cretaceous period. Several specimens of this dinosaur have been found in central and northern Queensland, and a few teeth have been found in New South Wales. There is a full size replica in the town.

On 22 November 2019, the Queensland Government decided to amalgamate the localities in the Barcaldine Region, resulting in five expanded localities based on the larger towns: Alpha, Aramac, Barcaldine, Jericho and Muttaburra. Muttaburra was expanded to incorporate Bangall, Cornish Creek (western part), Sardine (western part), and Tablederry.

== Demographics ==
In the 2006 census, the locality of Muttaburra and the surrounding area had a population of 106 people.

In the 2016 census, the locality of Muttaburra had a population of 88 people.

In the 2021 census, the locality of Muttaburra had a population of 158 people.

== Heritage listings ==
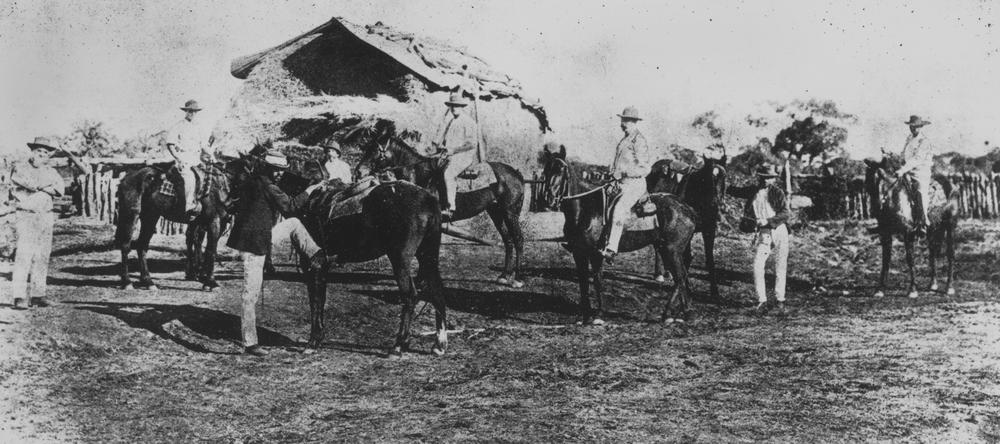
Stockmen at Mount Cornish sheep station, near Muttaburra, Queensland, 1898

Muttaburra has a number of heritage-listed sites, including:

- Mount Cornish Homestead at Cornish Creek, 5 kilometres (3.1 mi) north-east of Muttaburra

== Economy ==
In 2017, the 4732 postcode (which includes Muttaburra) was one of the lowest 10 postcodes by income level in Australia, with an average income of $21,415.

== Education ==
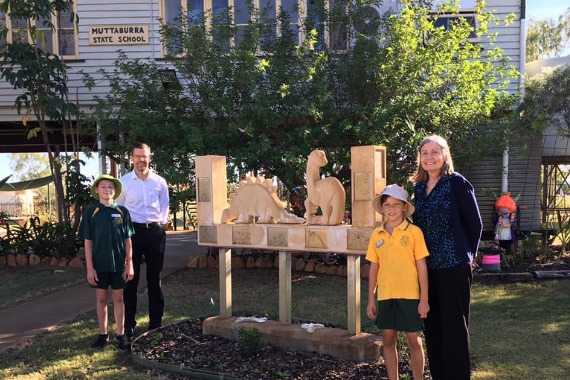
Muttaburra State School, 2019

Muttaburra State School is a government primary (Early Childhood to Year 6) school for boys and girls at 42 Sword Street (22.5949°S 144.5436°E). In 2018, the school had an enrolment of 8 students with 2 teachers (1 full-time equivalent) and 4 non-teaching staff (2 full-time equivalent).

There are no secondary schools in Muttaburra with the closest government secondary school being Longreach State High School in Longreach, 121.6 kilometres (75.5 mi) to the south-west. Given the distance, alternatives are distance education and boarding school.

== Amenities ==
Barcaldine Regional Council operates a library at 20 Bruford Street.

The Muttaburra branch of the Queensland Country Women's Association has its rooms at 33 Edkins Street.

All Saints Anglican Church is at 25 Sword Street (22.595402°S 144.5455°E).

St Joseph's Catholic Church is at 26 Sword Street (22.595023°S 144.5456°E).

There is a Primary Health Care Centre for minor treatments and care, as well as ambulance services and 24/7 emergency on-call services. Muttaburra relies on the hospital in Longreach or Townsville plus the Royal Flying Doctor service.

== Sport ==
Muttaburra has a range of sporting activities and facilities including fishing, rodeo, a 25-metre (82 ft) swimming pool, shooting range, tennis courts and race course.

There is an 18-hole golf course on the Cramsie Muttaburra Road (22.5748°S 144.5306°E). It is open to the public.

The Muttaburra Racecourse is on Racecourse Road (22.6070°S 144.5416°E).

== Transport ==
Due to the small size of the town there is almost no public transport, however Longreach does run a bus service to the town one to two times a month.

Muttaburra Airport is on Muttaburra Airport Road off the Cramsie Muttaburra Road (22.5848°S 144.5257°E). It is operated by the Barcaldine Regional Council.

== Climate ==
Muttaburra has a subtropical climate with very hot summers. Temperatures over 37 °C (99 °F) and heat waves are common, however in winter the temperature can go as low as 8 °C (46 °F), if not lower. Frosts occur rarely. Most of the rainfall occurs in the summer months with falls around the 400 to 550 millimetres (16 to 22 in), Flooding can occur most years and in the "big wets" large areas of the major watercourses are inundated. Droughts are not uncommon. The wettest month ever recorded was September 2010 when 162 mm fell.

== Attractions ==
Bush-walking, water-skiing and fishing are some of the main recreational activities in the area. The headwaters of the Thomson River and the camping area at Broadwater and the Muttaburra Pump Hole, is where species such as Yellowbelly and Black Bream can be caught.

Other attractions are found in Muttaburra itself, including the Memorial Medical Museum and the Cassimatis Store. The Memorial Medical Museum commemorates Dr Joseph Arratta. The museum is housed in what once was the Muttaburra Hospital. After its closure the building was converted into a historical display and museum and named in honour of Dr Arratta. The store and of George and Stavroola Cassimatis and their five children has been restored and is open to the public.

The Muttaburra rest area provides the first two nights stay free plus meals and accommodation are also available at the Exchange Hotel on the main street. The Caravan Park has powered sites, barbecues and a washing machine. Hot food, groceries and fuel are available at the local store.

== Events ==
On the first Saturday of June each year the Landsborough Flock Ewe Show is held. The show has sheep and wool judging, cattle displays, trade displays, ladies pavilion, shopping, activities for kids, cattle drive plus dinner and entertainment.

The Muttaburra Amateur Turf Club was established in 1919 and runs an annual race day called the Muttaburra Cup in August.
