= Yilba =

Aboriginal Australian people

The Yilba, also written Ilba and Jilba, are or were an Aboriginal Australian people of the present-day state of Queensland.

== Country ==
In Norman Tindale's estimation, the Yilba were assigned a tribal domain extending over approximately 19,000 square kilometres (7,400 mi^{2}), from the area of Cape River westwards as far as the Great Dividing Range. Their northern boundaries lay roughly about Pentland Hills and Seventy Mile Range. Their eastern extension was around the Suttor River, while their southern limits were at Lake Buchanan. The Yilba were indigenous to places like on Campaspe River; and the Natal Downs.

== Language ==
The Yilba language (and variant names as per the people) is extinct as of 2020, with no speakers recorded since before 1975. It is regarded as a dialect of Biri.

== Social organisation ==
The Yilba were composed of kin groups of which six at least are known:

- Yukkaburra
- Wokkulburra (eel people)
- Pegulloburra
- Mungooburra
- Mungullaburra (spinifex people)
- Goondoolooburra (emu people)

While stating that there are six "hordes", Tindale gave the names of only three, two of which differ from the list in one of his primary sources on the six, namely:

- Moothaburra
- Mungera

He also adds a possible fourth group:

- Muqkibara (Note: This attribution is contested, with some informants claiming that the Muqkibara were a branch of the Mian.)

== Alternative names ==
- Yukkaburra, Yuckaburra
- Munkeeburra
- Moothaburra (horde name)
- Mungera, Mungerra (horde name)
- Eneby (language name) (Note: Tindale suggests the possibility that this may be a misreading by E. M. Curr of the word Elleby.)
- Pagulloburra, Pegulloburra (horde name)

== Sources ==
- "AIATSIS map of Indigenous Australia". AIATSIS. 14 May 2024.
- Armstrong, M. (1886). "The Watershed and Upper Portion of the Cape River" (PDF). In Curr, Edward Micklethwaite (ed.). The Australian race: its origin, languages, customs, place of landing in Australia and the routes by which it spread itself over the continent. Vol. 2. Melbourne: J. Ferres. pp. 464–467.
- Roth, W. E. (1897). Ethnological Studies among the North-West-Central Queensland Aborigines (PDF). Brisbane: Edmund Gregory, Government Printer.
- Sutton, Peter (November 1973). Gugu-Badshun and its neighbours: A Linguistic Salvage Study (PDF). Macquarie University M. A. honours thesis.
- Sutton, Peter (1975). Sutton, Peter (ed.). Languages of Cape York: papers presented to the linguistic symposium, part B, held in conjunction with the Australian Institute of Aboriginal Studies Biennial General Meeting, May, 1974. Australian Institute of Aboriginal Studies. pp. 116–120.
- Tindale, Norman Barnett (1974). "Ilba (QLD)". Aboriginal Tribes of Australia: Their Terrain, Environmental Controls, Distribution, Limits, and Proper Names. Australian National University. ISBN 978-0-708-10741-6. Archived from the original on 18 January 2018.
- Tompson, F.M.; Chatfield, W. (1886). "Natal Downs Station, Cape River" (PDF). In Curr, Edward Micklethwaite (ed.). The Australian race: its origin, languages, customs, place of landing in Australia and the routes by which it spread itself over the continent. Vol. 2. Melbourne: J. Ferres. pp. 468–483.
