= Campaspe (disambiguation) =

Campaspe was a supposed mistress of Alexander the Great.

Campaspe may also refer to:

== Arts ==
- Campaspe (play) (c. 1584)

== Events ==
- Campaspe Plains massacre (1839)

== Places ==
- Campaspe, Queensland (Australia)
- Campaspe River (Queensland, Australia)
- Campaspe River (Victoria, Australia)
- Shire of Campaspe (Victoria, Australia)

== See also ==
- Campaspero—A region in Spain
