= Acacia hyaloneura =

Scientific classification
- Kingdom: Plantae
- Clade: Tracheophytes
- Clade: Angiosperms
- Clade: Eudicots
- Clade: Rosids
- Order: Fabales
- Family: Fabaceae
- Subfamily: Caesalpinioideae
- Clade: Mimosoid clade
- Genus: Acacia
- Species: A. hyaloneura

Binomial name
- Acacia hyaloneura Pedley
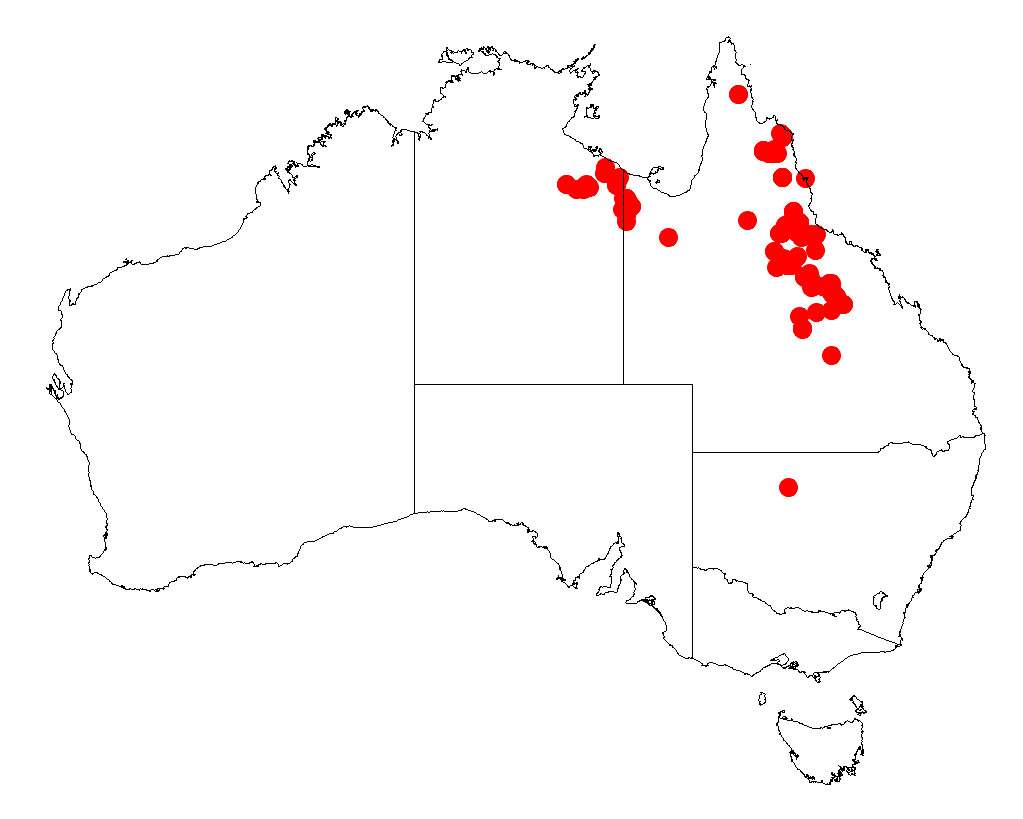
- Occurrence data from AVH

Synonyms
- Racosperma hyaloneurum (Pedley) Pedley

Species of legume

Acacia hyaloneura is a species of flowering plant in the family Fabaceae and is endemic to north-eastern Australia. It is an erect, often spindly shrub or tree with smooth, brown bark, erect narrowly elliptic to linear or narrowly oblong phyllodes, spikes of cream-coloured to pale yellow flowers and pendulous, knife-like to linear pods abruptly tapered both ends.

== Description ==
Acacia hyaloneura is an erect, often spindly shrub or tree that typically grows to a height of 2–3 m (6 ft 7 in – 9 ft 10 in) and has smooth brown bark, and branchlets that are angular orange or yellow near the ends, later reddish and glabrous. Its phyllodes are erect, narrowly elliptic to linear or narrowly oblong, mostly 60–145 mm (2.4–5.7 in) long, 6–12 mm (0.24–0.47 in) wide and thinly leathery with two to four parallel veins per millimetre. The flowers are cream-coloured to pale yellow and borne in spikes 20–35 mm (0.79–1.38 in) long. Flowering has been recorded in December and January and from May to July. The pods are pendulous, knife-like to linear, 45–125 mm (1.8–4.9 in) long, 4–7 mm (0.16–0.28 in) wide, more or less abruptly tapered at both ends, woody to blackish brown and glabrous. The seeds are narrowly oblong, 5.4–6.5 mm (0.21–0.26 in) long and dull black.

== Taxonomy ==
Acacia hyaloneura was first formally described in 1978 Leslie Pedley in the journal Austrobaileya from specimens collected 34 km (21 mi) from Pentland towards Torrens Creek in 1972.

== Distribution and habitat ==
This species of wattle is found in the western part of the top end of the Northern Territory and north-western parts of Queensland and along the Great Dividing Range from around Torrens Creek to about 150 km (93 mi) north of Clermont. It grows in Acacia or Eucalyptus woodland on slopes and ridges in sandy, clayey or rocky soils around and over sandstone or granite.

== Conservation status ==
Acacia hyaloneura is listed as of "least concern" under the Queensland Government Nature Conservation Act 1992, but as "near threratened" under the Northern Territory Territory Parks and Wildlife Conservation Act.

== See also ==
- List of Acacia species
