= Upper Cornish Creek, Queensland =

Upper Cornish Creek
- Suburb
- Coordinates: 22.2138°S 145.2652°E
- Country: Australia
- State: Queensland
- LGA: Barcaldine Region
- Location: 103 km (64 mi) N of Aramac; 171 km (106 mi) N of Barcaldine; 266 km (165 mi) NE of Longreach; 1,241 km (771 mi) NW of Brisbane

Government
  - State electorate: Gregory
  - Federal division: Maranoa

Area
  - Total: 6,890.3 km^{2} (2,660.4 sq mi)

Population
  - Total: 43 (2016 census)
  - Density: 0.00624/km^{2} (0.01616/sq mi)
Suburbs around Upper Cornish Creek
Prairie	Torrens Creek	Pentland
Cornish Creek	Upper Cornish Creek	Galilee
Sardine	Pelican Creek	Upland

Upper Cornish Creek is a former rural locality in the Barcaldine Region, Queensland, Australia. In the 2016 census, Upper Cornish Creek had a population of 43 people.

== Geography ==
The Aramac Torrens Creek Road passes through the locality from the south-west (Pelican Creek) to the north-west (Torrens Creek).

The western part of the locality is mountainous and on the western side of the Great Dividing Range.

The principal land use is grazing on native vegetation.

== History ==
The locality takes its name from the creek, which was named in 1860 by explorer by William Landsborough after his business partner pastoralist Edward Cornish.

In the 2016 census, Upper Cornish Creek had a population of 43 people.

On 22 November 2019, the Queensland Government decided to amalgamate the localities in the Barcaldine Region, resulting in five expanded localities based on the larger towns: Alpha, Aramac, Barcaldine, Jericho and Muttaburra. Upper Cornish Creek was incorporated into Aramac.

== Education ==
There are no schools in Upper Cornish Creek. The nearest primary schools are in Muttaburra and Aramac. The nearest secondary schools are in Aramac (to Year 10) and Barcaldine (to Year 12).
