= Galilee, Queensland =

Galilee Queensland
- Coordinates: 22.3194°S 145.8194°E
- Population: 20 (2016 census)
  - Density: 0.0068/km^{2} (0.018/sq mi)
- Postcode(s): 4726
- Area: 2,940.8 km^{2} (1,135.4 sq mi)
- Location: 115 km (71 mi) NW of Aramac; 183 km (114 mi) NW of Barcaldine; 761 km (473 mi) WNW of Rockhampton; 1,255 km (780 mi) NW of Brisbane
- LGA(s): Barcaldine Region
- State electorate(s): Gregory
- Federal division(s): Maranoa
Suburbs around Galilee:
Upper Cornish Creek	Pentland	Laglan
Upper Cornish Creek	Galilee	Laglan
Upland	Upland	Dunrobin

Galilee is a former rural locality in the Barcaldine Region, Queensland, Australia. In the 2016 census, Galilee had a population of 20 people.

On 22 November 2019 the Queensland Government decided to amalgamate the localities in the Barcaldine Region, resulting in five expanded localities based on the larger towns: Alpha, Aramac, Barcaldine, Jericho and Muttaburra. Galilee was incorporated into Aramac.

== Geography ==
Galilee is bounded to the east by the Great Dividing Range and is within the Desert Uplands area of Central West Queensland. In the centre of the locality is Lake Galilee, a semi-arid saline lake which is 36 kilometres (22 mi) long, up to 12.5 kilometres (7.8 mi) and covers approximately 25,700 hectares (64,000 acres). It is quite shallow, being no more than 2 metres (6 ft 7 in) deep. Lake Galilee is registered on the Directory of Important Wetlands in Australia (DIWA) and provides an important refuge and breeding site for waterbirds. It has been identified by BirdLife International as an Important Bird Area (IBA) because it regularly supports over 1% of the world populations of freckled ducks and grey teals.

The principal land use is cattle grazing.

== History ==
Pastoral settlement began on the eastern side of Lake Galilee in 1877, when Charles Bowly acquired the Oakley run and stocked it with cattle. The following year he also acquired the “Northmere”, “Powala”, “Eastmere”, “Westmere” and “Southmere” runs with “Eastland” being added in 1883. Together these runs were named “Eastmere” Station.

Charles Bowly later regretted having invested in cattle. He wrote to the daughter of Robert Christison, his first employer:

“I, to my regret, got tired of sheep and wanted to ride after cattle. I sold out with 6000 cattle and 220 horses after going through five droughts and working for 21 years for the Bank, got £6000 left after 21 years hard work and hard living too, and that is Queensland."

The new owners of “Eastmere” reached the same conclusion and began introducing sheep two years after purchase and had completely changed to sheep in 1913. Charles Bowly was fortunate in selling when he did. The cattle tick invaded the district soon afterwards, killing up to 50% of cattle on some properties. In 1899 the worst drought Queensland had ever experienced set in, and by the time it broke in 1903, 80% of cattle in the district had died.

Cattle were reintroduced in very different market conditions in the 1950s and sheep were removed from “Eastmere” in 1966. Over the years other properties were taken up around the lake including “Fleetwood” to the north and west, “Lake Dunn” to the west, and “Clare” and Clunies Creek” – now “Clunievale” - to the south. “Eastmere” first pulled (cleared trees) in 1967, while “Fleetwood” first pulled in 1963. (The clearing of trees is a method of increasing productivity and sustainability of pastoral grazing enterprises in the Desert Uplands).

In the early 2000s a biodiversity audit suggested some concern about over-clearing in some ecosystems and said, "the most quantifiable threatening process is broad scale tree clearing", although data collated for 1999 indicated that 87% of the bioregion remained uncleared.

Buffel grass was introduced into the Desert Uplands bioregion the late 1960s. Many pastoralists regard it highly because in many situations it greatly increases pasture productivity for cattle. However, it is also widely seen as having negative environmental impacts through competition with native species and changes to fire regimes.

Many ecosystems in the Desert Uplands are being invaded by buffel grass, which forms a dense monoculture therefore decreasing the biodiversity of ecosystems Another aspect of invasion by buffel grass is that the buffel plant is very phosphorus- and nitrogen-dependent and a long term run down of phosphorus in the already phosphorus deficient soils of the Desert Uplands may occur leading to a further loss of native plant species.

In 1995, the Desert Uplands Build-up and Development Committee was established and has worked with landholders to enhance grazing and ecological sustainability, enterprise profitability and community resilience.

== Education ==
There are no schools in Galilee. The nearest primary school is in Aramac. The nearest secondary school is in Aramac (to Year 10 only). For Years 11 and 12, the nearest school is in Barcaldine.
