= Upland, Queensland =

Upland Queensland
- Coordinates: 22.6213°S 145.6183°E
- Population: 12 (2016 census)
  - Density: 0.0081/km^{2} (0.0210/sq mi)
- Area: 1,482.6 km^{2} (572.4 sq mi)
- Location: 65.5 km (41 mi) NW of Aramac; 133 km (83 mi) NNW of Barcaldine; 239 km (149 mi) NW of Longreach; 1,205 km (749 mi) NW of Brisbane
- LGA(s): Barcaldine Region
- State electorate(s): Gregory
- Federal division(s): Maranoa
Suburbs around Upland:
Galilee	Galilee	Galilee
Upper Cornish Creek	Upland	Dunrobin
Pelican Creek	Pelican Creek	Dunrobin

Upland is a former rural locality in the Barcaldine Region, Queensland, Australia. In the 2016 census, Upland had a population of 12 people.

On 22 November 2019 the Queensland Government decided to amalgamate the localities in the Barcaldine Region, resulting in five expanded localities based on the larger towns: Alpha, Aramac, Barcaldine, Jericho and Muttaburra. Upland was incorporated into Aramac.

== Geography ==
Upland is within the Desert Uplands area of Central West Queensland. In the centre of the locality is Lake Dunn, a small freshwater lake. The principal land use is cattle grazing.

The locality is bounded to the north-west by Lake Galilee, a large salt lake.

== Education ==
There are no schools in Upland. The nearest school is in Aramac which offers prep to Year 10 education. There is no Year 11 and 12 education available near Upland, except via distance education.

== Attractions ==
There are cabin and camping facilities at Lake Dunn. Popular activities are bird watching, fishing, swimming, water skiing, windsurfing, sailing and picnicking.

There is a sculpture trail alongside the road from Aramac to Lake Dunn and Rangers Valley. There are over 30 sculptures by local artist Milynda Roberts of animals and outback living.
