= Miyan people =

Historic Indigenous group of Queensland, Australia

The Miyan, or Mian, were an Indigenous people of the state of the Australian state of Queensland.

== Name ==
The ethnonym mian signifies 'man' in their language.

== Country ==
The Miyan were a people of Central West Queensland, with, according to Norman Tindale, some 5,000 square miles (13,000 km^{2}) of tribal territory running north from the lower Belyando River to the southern headwaters of Cape River and Mount Douglas. Their land took in Bulliwallah and their western frontier lay around the Dividing Range. Their southern boundary was around Lake Galilee and Labona.

== Social organization ==
The Miyan were divided into Band societyhordes, of which the following are known:

- Munkibura (See however Ilba)
- Wokkelburra (located near Bulliwallah)
- Koombokkaburra
- Pegulloburra
- Oncooburra

== Hunting ==
The Miyan technique for hunting kangaroos was to capture them by nets. With regard to the emu, the following report survives:

'Emu are speared in dry weather when water remains in but few holes. Having found by the tracks those commonly frequented, the Black, provided with a spear, ascends some tree near at hand, from which he suspends a bunch of emu feathers with a string. When the birds come to water, he imitates their cry, and they, with the curiosity so characteristic of them, proceed to examine the bnunch of feathers, when the Black hid among the boughs overhead spears one of them.'

== History of contact ==
Miyan lands were first subject to colonial occupation in 1862, at which date their population was estimated to be around 400 people. Within a little over two decades, their numbers had been halved, according to one observer simply through their adoption of the white habit of consuming tobacco and salt beef, since they disliked alcohol intensely. Infanticide was unknown, but, after white settlement, numerous children died of colds and fever. One Miyan tribesman who helped out on stations, rejoined his clan, which happened to be at the time on a cattle-run. The white proprietor ordered them top be 'dispersed', (Note: "To an observer of languages, it is interesting to note the new signification of the verb to disperse: that when a Black guirl of fifteen is shot down she is said to be dispersed." (MacGlashan 1887, p. 21)) and the youth was shot dead. A fifteen-year-old girl was mortally wounded by another white 'dispersal' when her groups accidentally set fire to grass on a river-bank, where they were fishing on their own land. Both incidents are mentioned simply to underline that ritual cannibalism reportedly ensued on each occasion, as part of the funeral rites for people who suffered a sudden death.

Another occupant William Chatfield, described the situation of Miyan land invasion as follows:

The territory of the Pegulloburra,.. was first occupied as a station in 1863, but the tribe was not what is technically called let in until 1868. Generally, after the first occupation of a tract of country by a settler, from three to ten years elapse before the tribe or tribes to which the land has belonged from time immemorial is let in, that is, is allowed to come to the homestead, or seek for food within a radius of five or ten miles of it. During this period the squatter's party and the tribe live in a state of warfare; the former shooting down a savage now and then when opportunity offers, and calling in the aid of the Black Police from time to time to- avenge in a wholesale way the killing or frightening of stock off the run by the tribe. Acting on the well-known feature of aboriginal ethics, that every male stranger is an enemy, who must, if possible, be slain, the Queensland Government has largely availed itself of its aboriginal population for the purpose of punishing aboriginal aggressions. The stereotyped proceedings which follow the taking up of a run may be described in this way, and if I mention them, it is only on the chance that further publicity —for they are well known—may possibly contribute to the adoption of more humane measures.

When the settler then locates his stock on a piece of country hitherto in the sole possession of a tribe, the roots, grass-seeds, and game on which the people habitually live quickly fail. Then come hunger and also anger, for amongst themselves the hunting or gathering of food by a tribe on land which does not belong to it is always considered a casus belli by the rightful proprietors; just as in our case to take or destroy a neighbour's sheep or cabbages is a punishable act. Then some cattle are speared, or frightened off the run by the mere presence of the Blacks in search of food. In either of these events the Blacks are attacked and some of them shot down. In revenge, a shepherd or stockman is speared. Recourse is then had to the Government; half-a-dozen or more young Blacks in some part of the colony remote from the scene of the outrage are enlisted, mounted, armed, liberally supplied with ball cartridges, and despatched to the spot under the charge of a Sub-inspector of Police. Hot for blood, the Black troopers are laid on the trail of the tribe; then follow the careful tracking, the surprise, the shooting at a distance safe from spears, the deaths of many of the males, the capture of the women, who know that if they abstain from flight they will be spared; the gratified lust of the savage, and the Sub-inspector's report that the tribe has been "dispersed," for such is the official term used to convey the occurrence of these proceedings. When the tribe has gone through several repetitions of this experience, and the chief part of its young men been butchered, the women, the remnant of the men, and such children as the Black troopers have not troubled themselves to shoot, are let in, or allowed to come to the settler's homestead, and the war is at an end.

== Alternative names ==
- Koombokkaburra
- Munkibura
- Oncooburra
- Pegulloburra
- Wokkelburra
- Wokkulburra (from their word, wak:ul, for 'eel')

Source: Tindale 1974, p. 181

== Some words ==
- knagana ('forbidden', the word for the law banning the consumption of certain foods for certain classes of people)
- knurra (wild dog)
- meearew (white man)
- waddey/yabboo (father)
- wandi (tame dog)
- yanga (mother)

== Sources ==
- Bennett, Samuel (1867). The History of Australian Discovery and Colonisation (PDF). Sydney: Hanson and Bennett.
- Chatfield, William (1886). "Natal Downs Station, Cape River" (PDF). In Curr, Edward Micklethwaite (ed.). The Australian race: its origin, languages, customs, place of landing in Australia and the routes by which it spread itself over the continent. Vol. 2. Melbourne: J. Ferres. pp. 468–479.
- Howitt, Alfred William (1883). "Notes on the Australian Class Systems". Journal of the Anthropological Institute of Great Britain and Ireland. 12: 496–512. doi:10.2307/2841688. JSTOR 2841688.
- Howitt, Alfred William (1889). "Further Notes on the Australian Class Systems". Journal of the Anthropological Institute of Great Britain and Ireland. 18: 31–70. doi:10.2307/2842513. JSTOR 2842513.
- Howitt, Alfred William (1904). The native tribes of south-east Australia (PDF). Macmillan.
- MacGlashan, James (1887). "Main Range between Belyando and Cape Rivers" (PDF). In Curr, Edward Micklethwaite (ed.). The Australian race: its origin, languages, customs, place of landing in Australia and the routes by which it spread itself over the continent. Vol. 3. Melbourne: J. Ferres. pp. 18–25.
- Muirhead (1887). "Belyando" (PDF). In Curr, Edward Micklethwaite (ed.). The Australian race: its origin, languages, customs, place of landing in Australia and the routes by which it spread itself over the continent. Vol. 3. Melbourne: J. Ferres. pp. 26–33.
- Tindale, Norman Barnett (1974). "Mian (QLD)". Aboriginal Tribes of Australia: Their Terrain, Environmental Controls, Distribution, Limits, and Proper Names. Australian National University. ISBN 978-0-708-10741-6.
