= Acacia faucium =

Scientific classification
- Kingdom: Plantae
- Clade: Tracheophytes
- Clade: Angiosperms
- Clade: Eudicots
- Clade: Rosids
- Order: Fabales
- Family: Fabaceae
- Subfamily: Caesalpinioideae
- Clade: Mimosoid clade
- Genus: Acacia
- Species: A. faucium

Binomial name
- Acacia faucium Pedley
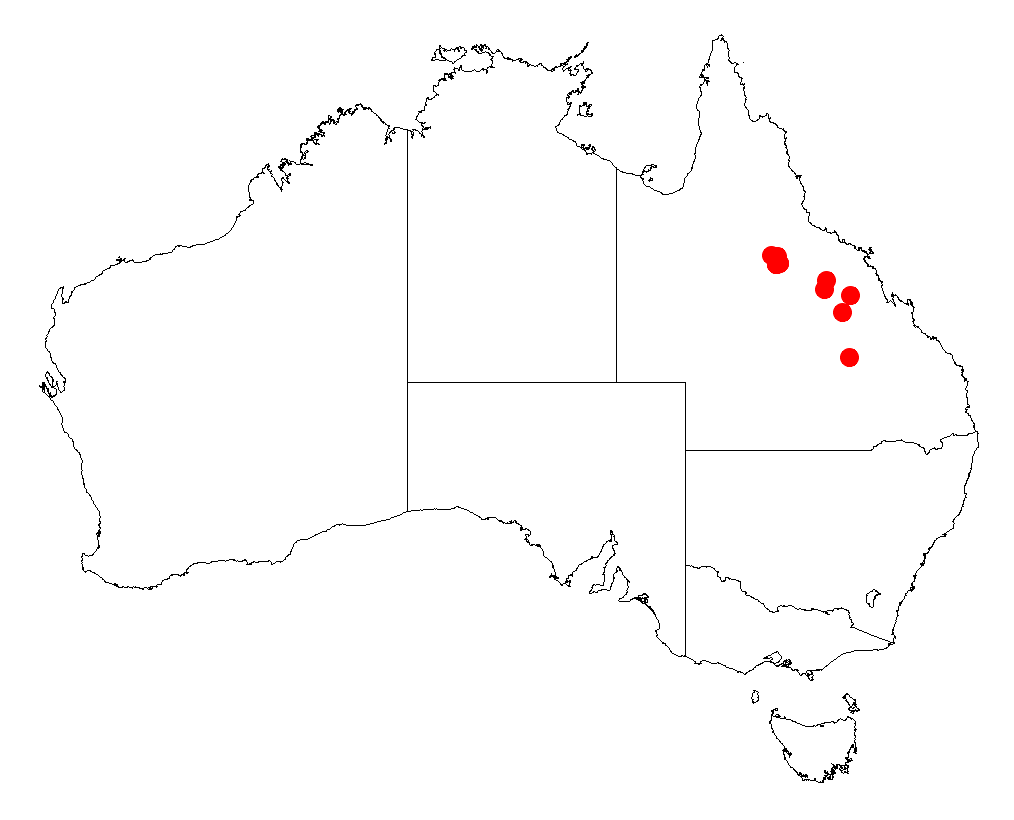
- Occurrence data from AVH

Synonyms
- Acacia sp. (Bertya Creek A.R.Bean 4611); Racosperma faucium (Pedley) Pedley

Species of legume

Acacia faucium is a species of flowering plant in the family Fabaceae and is endemic to Queensland, Australia. It is a tree with terete branchlets, straight to shallowly sickle-shaped phyllodes, spikes of flowers, and linear, crust-like pods.

== Description ==
Acacia faucium is a tree that typically grows to a height of 3–10 m (9.8–32.8 ft) and has terete, glabrous branchlets. Its phyllodes are straight to shallowly sickle-shaped, thinly leathery, 120–180 mm (4.7–7.1 in) long and 20–30 mm (0.79–1.18 in) wide with many parallel, longitudinal veins, two or three more prominent than the rest. The flowers are borne in spikes 35–60 mm (1.4–2.4 in) long on glabrous peduncles 4–5 mm (0.16–0.20 in) long. Flowering has been recorded from June to October, and the pods are linear, crust-like, up to 80 mm (3.1 in) long and 3–4 mm (0.12–0.16 in) wide, straight to curved or sometimes openly coiled. The pods are dark brown, glabrous, rounded and wrinkled over the seeds. The seeds are pale brown, 3.5–4 mm (0.14–0.16 in) long with a cup-shaped aril.

== Taxonomy ==
Acacia faucium was first formally described in 1999 by Leslie Pedley from specimens collected collected by Anthony Bean near Bertya Creek in the White Mountains National Park in 1992. The specific epithet (faucium) means 'of gorges', referring to the habitat of the species at the type location.

== Distribution and habitat ==
This species of wattle grows in woodland and thickets on sandy creek banks and a flat plain in the headwaters of Torrens Creek in White Mountains National Park where it occurs in sandstone gorges, and in broken country further south, 100 km (62 mi) north of Clermont.

== See also ==
- List of Acacia species
