= Lake Dunn =

Lake in Queensland, Australia

Lake Dunn (Pajingo Bola)
- Location within Queensland
- Location: Upland, 63km North East of Aramac, Queensland
- Coordinates: 22.5999°S 145.672°E
- Type: Reservoir
- Basin countries: Australia

Lake Dunn is a freshwater lake in the locality of Upland in Barcaldine Region, Queensland, Australia. Also known as Pajingo Bola, meaning "Big Fella Waterhole", the lake is the only wetland area in Central West Queensland and is consequently home to a large waterfowl population. Lake Dunn is located south of the larger Lake Galilee.

The current shoreline of Lake Dunn represents only a small area of the original lakebed.

The local council have tried to improve the area by rendering the shores attractive and provide picnic facilities. The foreshores have good stands of river red gum and coolibah trees and, in recent years, it has become a popular destination for locals. However, in spite of the council's best efforts, the lake is muddy in appearance and therefore of greatest appeal to birdwatchers and nature lovers.

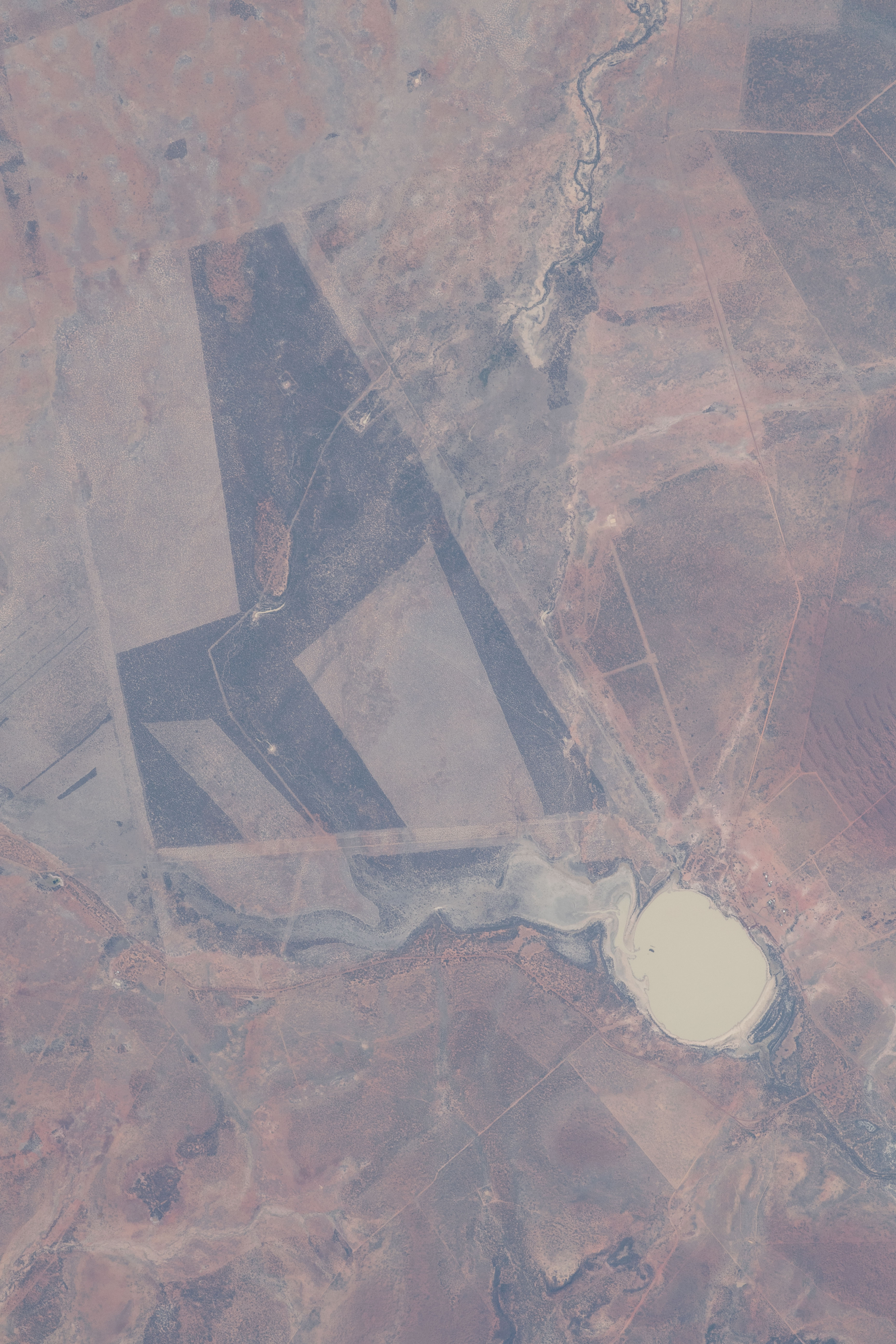

== See also ==
- List of lakes of Australia
