= Belyando, Queensland =

Belyando
- Suburb
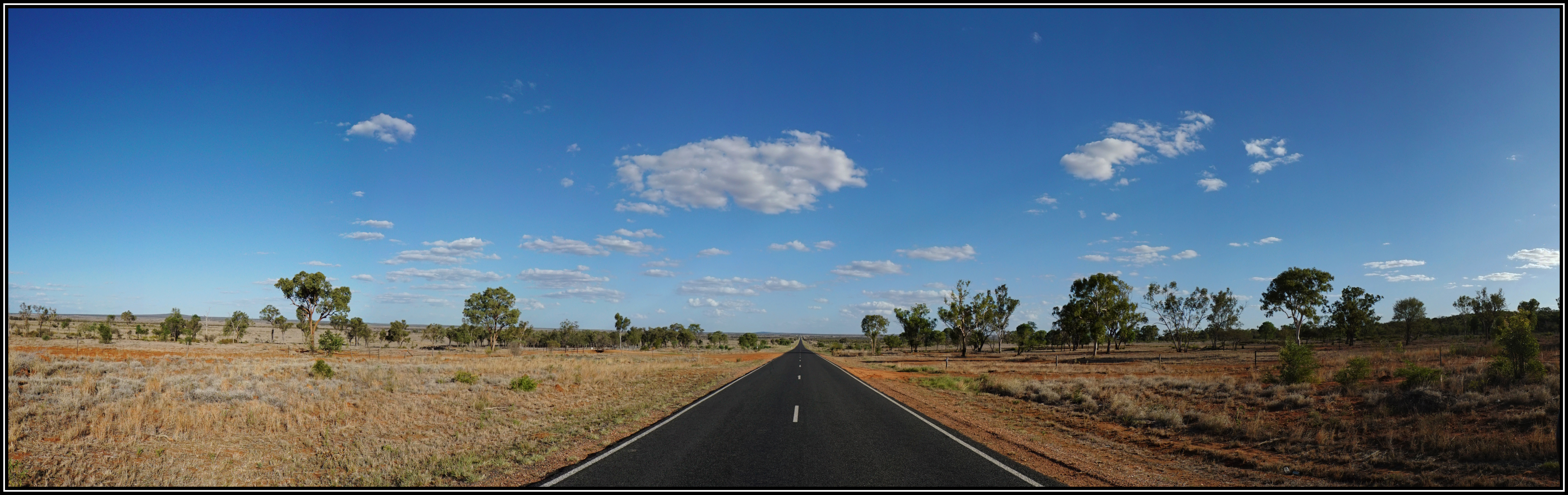
- View of the Gregory Developmental Road in Belyando, 2015

- Interactive map of Belyando
- Coordinates: 21.8505°S 146.6061°E
- Country: Australia
- State: Queensland
- LGA: Isaac Region
- Location: 258 km (160 mi) W of Moranbah; 394 km (245 mi) WSW of Mackay; 642 km (399 mi) NW of Rockhampton; 1,108 km (688 mi) NNW of Brisbane

Government
  - State electorate: Burdekin
  - Federal division: Capricornia

Area
  - Total: 5,448.3 km^{2} (2,103.6 sq mi)

Population
  - Total: 307 (2021 census)
  - Density: 0.05635/km^{2} (0.14594/sq mi)
- Time zone: UTC+10:00 (AEST)
- Postcode: 4721
Suburbs around Belyando
| Llanarth | Llanarth | Mount Coolon |
| Pentland | Belyando | Pasha; Frankfield |
| Laglan | Elgin | Elgin |

Belyando is a rural locality in the Isaac Region, Queensland, Australia. In the 2021 census, Belyando had a population of 307 people.

== Geography ==
The Belyando River passes through the locality from south to north, being fed by a number of tributary creeks. The Belyando River feeds into the Suttor River and then into the Burdekin River which flows into the Coral Sea.

The Gregory Developmental Road passes through the locality from the north-east to the south-east; the Bowen Developmental Road enters the locality from the north-east and has its junction with the Gregory Developmental Road in the north-east of the locality. This junction is known as the Belyando Crossing.

The Nairana National Park is in the north-east of the locality and the Wilandspey Conservation Park in the north of the locality.

== History ==
The locality names presumably derives from the Belyando River, where Belyando is believed to an Aboriginal word recorded by explorer and surveyor Thomas Mitchell, where "baal" means "no" and "yan" means "go", spoken by an Aboriginal man trying to stop Mitchell proceeding farther north.

Belyando was also the name associated with the clan that lived near to the Belyando River.

The Yacamunda Station was established by the Earl family and cattle farming is still important for the local area.

== Demographics ==
In the 2016 census Belyando had a population of 66 people.

In the 2021 census, Belyando had a population of 307 people.

== Education ==
There are no schools in Belyando nor nearby. The options are distance education and boarding school.
