= Acacia burdekensis =

Scientific classification
- Kingdom: Plantae
- Clade: Tracheophytes
- Clade: Angiosperms
- Clade: Eudicots
- Clade: Rosids
- Order: Fabales
- Family: Fabaceae
- Subfamily: Caesalpinioideae
- Clade: Mimosoid clade
- Genus: Acacia
- Species: A. burdekensis

Binomial name
- Acacia burdekensis Pedley
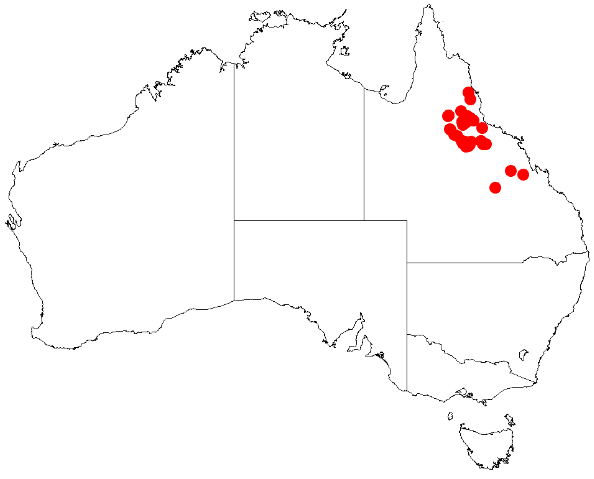
- Acacia burdekensis occurrence data from Australasian Virtual Herbarium

Synonyms
- Acacia sp. (Torrens Creek C.T.White 8725); Racosperma burdekense (Pedley) Pedley

Species of legume

Acacia burdekensis is a species of flowering plant in the family Fabaceae and is endemic to North Queensland. It is a shrub or tree with mostly curved, greyish-green phyllodes, spikes of bright golden yellow flowers, and linear pods.

== Description ==
Acacia burdekensis is a shrub or tree that typically grows to a height of 2–9 m (6 ft 7 in – 29 ft 6 in) and is glabrous, often with reddish branchlets. Its phyllodes are mostly slightly to strongly curved, 90–150 mm (3.5–5.9 in) long and 7–15 mm (0.28–0.59 in) wide, glabrous and with many parallel veins, two or three more prominent than the others. The flowers are bright golden-yellow, borne in spikes 40–70 mm (1.6–2.8 in) long on peduncles mostly 10–15 mm (0.39–0.59 in) long. Flowering has been recorded between February and August, and the pods are glabrous, linear, sticky and dark brown, 3–4 mm (0.12–0.16 in) wide.

== Taxonomy ==
Acacia burdekensis was first formally described by Leslie Pedley in the journal Austrobaileya from specimens collected by Anthony Bean near Bertya Creek in the White Mountains National Park in 1992. The specific epithet (burdekensis) is a contraction of 'burdekin' and '-ensis', referring to the species mostly occurring in the basin of the Burdekin River.

== Distribution and habitat ==
This species of wattle grows in stony and sandy soils on hillsides and near creek banks and is largely restricted to the northern parts of the Burdekin River in northern Queensland.

== Conservation status ==
Acacia burdekensis is listed as of "least concern" under the Queensland Government Nature Conservation Act 1992.

== See also ==
- List of Acacia species
