= Elgin, Queensland =

Elgin
- Suburb
- Interactive map of Elgin
- Coordinates: 22.2525°S 146.7202°E
- Country: Australia
- State: Queensland
- LGA: Isaac Region
- Location: 150 km (93 mi) NNW of Clermont; 249 km (155 mi) WNW of Moranbah; 418 km (260 mi) WSW of Mackay; 528 km (328 mi) NW of Rockhampton; 1,090 km (680 mi) NW of Brisbane

Government
  - State electorate: Burdekin
  - Federal division: Capricornia

Area
  - Total: 2,339.9 km^{2} (903.4 sq mi)

Population
  - Total: 52 (2021 census)
  - Density: 0.02222/km^{2} (0.0576/sq mi)
- Time zone: UTC+10:00 (AEST)
- Postcode: 4721
Suburbs around Elgin
Belyando	Belyando	Frankfield
Belyando	Elgin	Frankfield
Laglan	Laglan	Laglan

Elgin is a rural locality in the Isaac Region, Queensland, Australia. In the 2021 census, Elgin had a population of 52 people.

== Geography ==
Epping Forest National Park is in the south-east of the locality (22.3500°S 146.7025°E). Apart from the national park, the land use is almost entirely grazing on native vegetation.

== Demographics ==
In the 2016 census, Elgin had a population of 41 people.

In the 2021 census, Elgin had a population of 52 people.

== Education ==
There are no schools in Elgin nor nearby. The options are distance education and boarding school.
