= Llanarth, Queensland =

Llanarth
- Suburb
- Interactive map of Llanarth
- Coordinates: 21.3286°S 146.4624°E
- Country: Australia
- State: Queensland
- LGA: Charters Towers Region
- Location: 134 km (83 mi) S of Charters Towers CBD; 270 km (170 mi) SSW of Townsville; 373 km (232 mi) W of Mackay; 1,174 km (729 mi) NNW of Brisbane

Government
  - State electorate: Traeger
  - Federal division: Kennedy

Area
  - Total: 4,941.5 km^{2} (1,907.9 sq mi)

Population
  - Total: 81 (2021 census)
  - Density: 0.01639/km^{2} (0.04245/sq mi)
- Time zone: UTC+10:00 (AEST)
- Postcode: 4820
Suburbs around Llanarth
Pentland	Campaspe; Seventy Mile	Mount Coolon
Pentland	Llanarth	Mount Coolon
Pentland	Belyando	Belyando

Llanarth is a rural locality in the Charters Towers Region, Queensland, Australia. In the 2021 census, Llanarth had a population of 81 people.

== Demographics ==
In the 2016 census, Llanarth had a population of 48 people.

In the 2021 census, Llanarth had a population of 81 people.

== Heritage listings ==
Llanarth has a number of heritage-listed sites, including:

- Suttor River Causeway on the Old Bowen Downs Road, St Annes Road

== Education ==
There are no schools in Llanarth nor nearby. The options are distance education and boarding school.
