= Homestead, Queensland =

Homestead
- Town
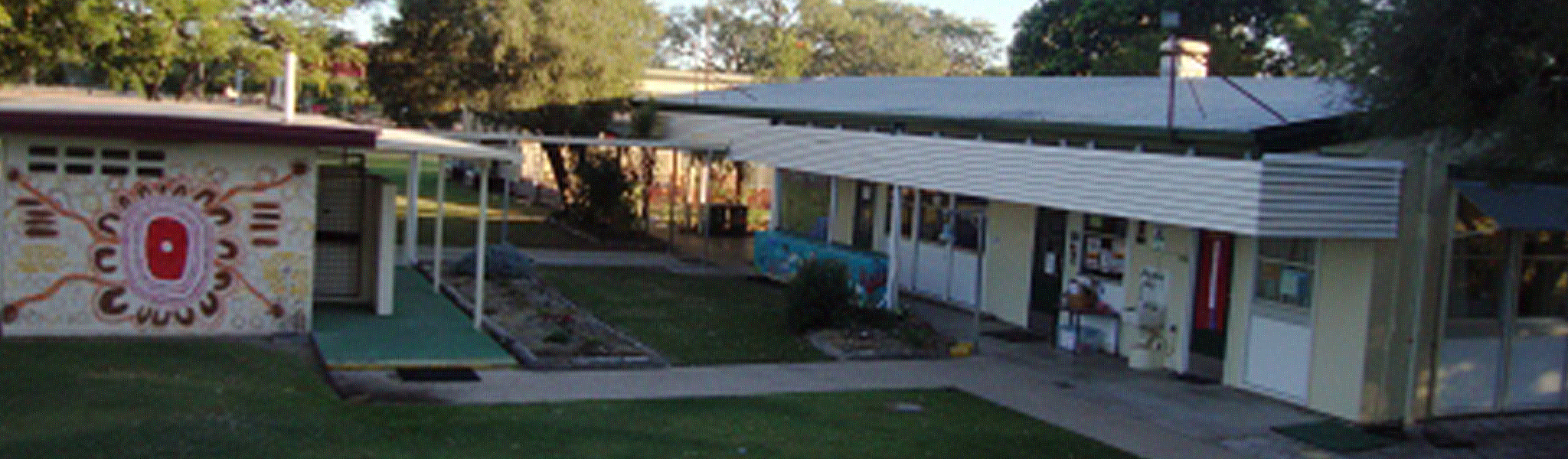
- Homestead State School, 2025

- Interactive map of Homestead
- Coordinates: 20.3616°S 145.6580°E
- Country: Australia
- State: Queensland
- LGA: Charters Towers Region
- Location: 32.8 km (20.4 mi) NW of Pentland; 74 km (46 mi) SW of Charters Towers; 210 km (130 mi) SW of Townsville; 1,372 km (853 mi) NNW of Brisbane

Government
  - State electorate: Traeger
  - Federal division: Kennedy

Area
  - Total: 1,321.7 km^{2} (510.3 sq mi)

Population
  - Total: 38 (2021 census)
  - Density: 0.0288/km^{2} (0.0745/sq mi)
- Time zone: UTC+10:00 (AEST)
- Postcode: 4816
Localities around Homestead
Basalt	Basalt	Basalt
Pentland	Homestead	Campaspe
Pentland	Pentland	Campaspe

Homestead is a rural town and locality in the Charters Towers Region, Queensland, Australia. In the 2021 census, the locality of Homestead had a population of 38 people.

== Geography ==
The Flinders Highway traverses from east to south-west through the locality, passing through the town which is located in the east of the locality. The Great Northern railway line follows a similar route parallel and immediately south of the highway with the Homestead railway station servicing the town.

== History ==
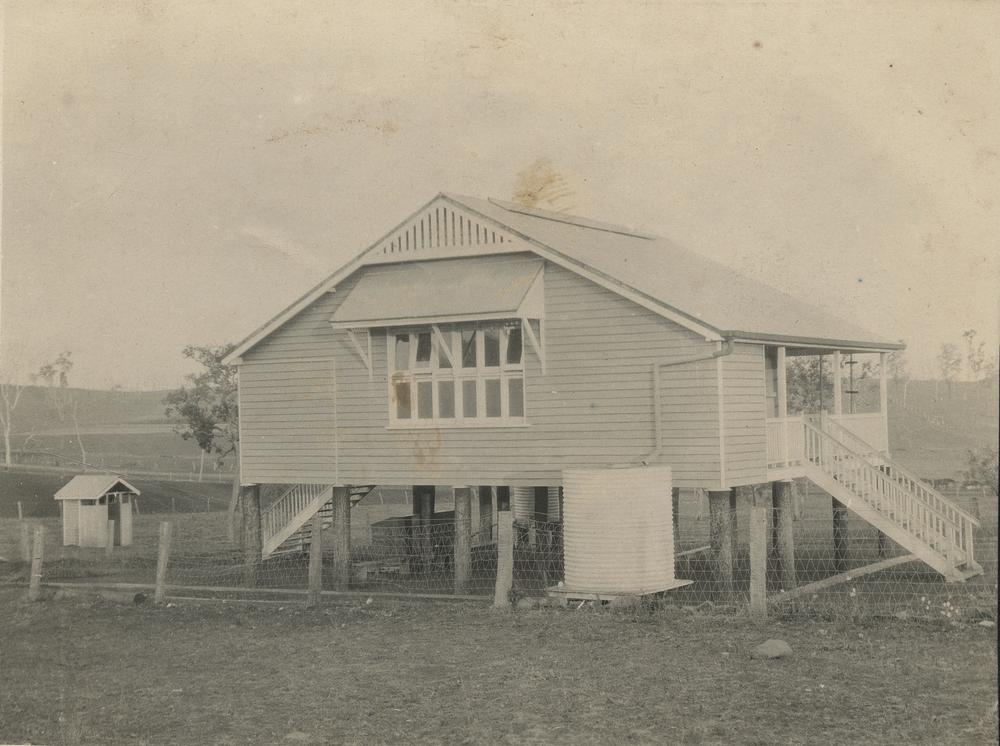
Homestead State School, circa 1925

In 1883, gold was discovered to the north of the town but it was not regarded as an important discovery and it was mined sporadically over the next 50 years.

The town of Homestead was surveyed by C.A.S Andrews on 23 December 1905. It takes its name from the Homestead Station pastoral run owned by pastoralist W.D. Stewart; it was later known as Allandale Station.

Homestead Provisional School opened on 31 October 1893 or 6 November 1893 under headmaster Ambrose J. George with nine boys and elevan girls. It became Homestead State School on 1 January 1909.

== Demographics ==
In the 2016 census, the locality of Homestead had a population of 48 people.

In the 2021 census, the locality of Homestead had a population of 38 people.

== Education ==
Homestead State School is a government primary (Early Childhood-6) school for boys and girls on 6 Home Street (also known as the Flinders Highway, 20.3607°S 145.6573°E). In 2016, the school had an enrolment of 8 students with 2 teachers (1 full-time equivalent) and 4 non-teaching staff (1 full-time equivalent). In 2018, the school had an enrolment of 8 students with 2 teachers (1 full-time equivalent) and 5 non-teaching staff (2 full-time equivalent). In 2024, the school had an enrolment of 2 students.

There are no secondary schools in Homestead, nor nearby. The alternatives are distance education and boarding school.
