= Campaspe River (Queensland) =

Location
- Country: Australia
- Location: North Queensland

Physical characteristics
- Source
  - location: Mount Stewart
  - coordinates: 20.311°S 145.432°E
- Mouth
  - location: confluence with the Cape River
  - coordinates: 20.993°S 146.373°E

The Campaspe River is a 376-kilometre (234 mi) long tributary of Cape River in Queensland, Australia near Charters Towers. It rises at Homestead and flows southeasterly through Pentland to Campaspe where it joins the Cape River.

Tributaries includes Homestead Creek, Balfe Creek and Policeman Creek. There are no major settlements along its course. The river is crossed by the Flinders Highway. Its catchment area remains undeveloped.

== See also ==
- List of rivers of Australia § Queensland
