= Seventy Mile, Queensland =

Seventy Mile
- Suburb
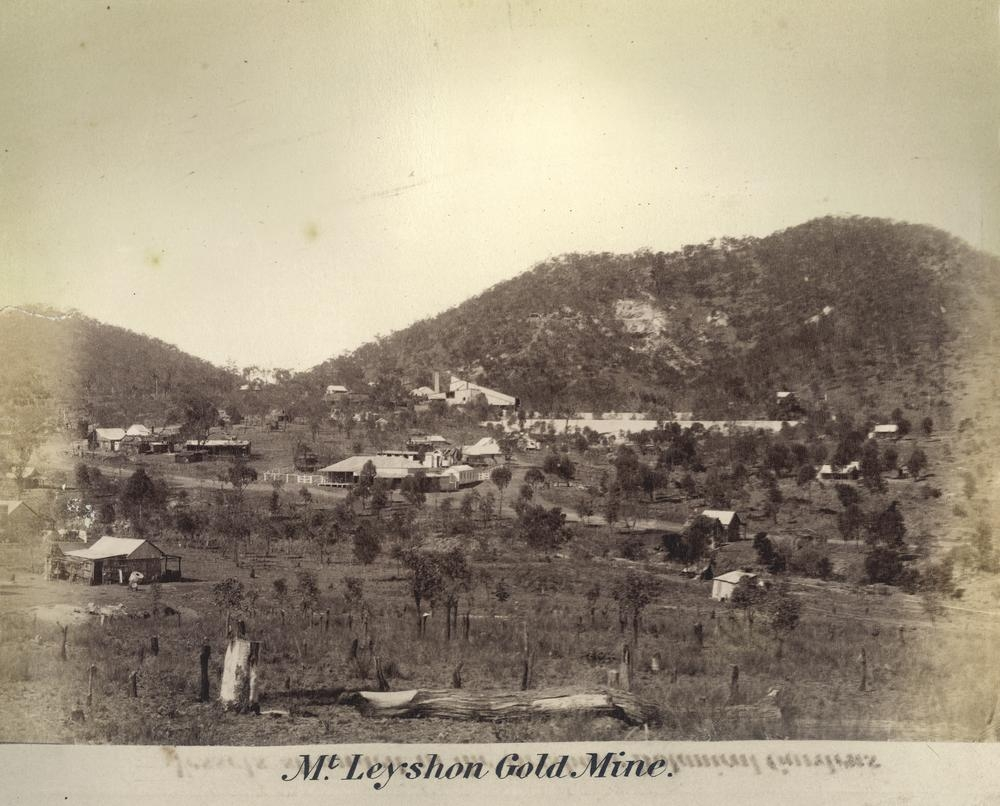
- Gold mining town of Mount Leyshon, circa 1890

- Interactive map of Seventy Mile
- Coordinates: 20.6188°S 146.5833°E
- Country: Australia
- State: Queensland
- LGA: Charters Towers Region
- Location: 108 km (67 mi) S of Charters Towers; 244 km (152 mi) SSW of Townsville; 1,289 km (801 mi) NNW of Brisbane

Government
  - State electorate: Traeger
  - Federal division: Kennedy

Area
  - Total: 6,269.3 km^{2} (2,420.6 sq mi)

Population
  - Total: 204 (2021 census)
  - Density: 0.03254/km^{2} (0.08428/sq mi)
- Time zone: UTC+10:00 (AEST)
- Postcode: 4820
Suburbs around Seventy Mile
Black Jack	Broughton	Ravenswood
Campaspe	Seventy Mile	Mount Wyatt
Campaspe	Llanarth	Mount Coolon

Seventy Mile is a rural locality in the Charters Towers Region, Queensland, Australia. In the 2021 census, Seventy Mile had a population of 204 people.

== Geography ==
The locality is bounded to the east by Lake Dalrymple, which is the impoundment of a number of rivers, including the Burdekin River (which bounds the locality to the north-east) and its tributary the Broughton River (which bounds the locality to the north), and by the Suttor River (which bounds the locality to the south-east).

The terrain is mountainous with numerous named peaks:

- Black Knob (20.2612°S 146.1866°E) 415 metres (1,362 ft)
- Blackfellow Mountain (The Pinnacles) (20.3808°S 146.8353°E) 342 metres (1,122 ft)
- Camp Oven Mountain (20.3733°S 146.8030°E) 446 metres (1,463 ft)
- Cornishman (20.1496°S 146.4289°E) 345 metres (1,132 ft)
- Matthews Pinnacle (20.2463°S 146.3408°E) 370 metres (1,210 ft)
- Mount Alma (20.6224°S 146.6370°E) 250 metres (820 ft)
- Mount Billygoat (20.5386°S 146.3366°E) 310 metres (1,020 ft)
- Mount Clarke (20.8819°S 146.7624°E) 262 metres (860 ft)
- Mount Cooper (20.4947°S 146.8114°E) 496 metres (1,627 ft)
- Mount Deane (20.3362°S 146.4076°E) 430 metres (1,410 ft)
- Mount Farrenden (20.3056°S 146.1915°E) 490 metres (1,610 ft)
- Mount Janet (20.5419°S 146.4460°E) 513 metres (1,683 ft)
- Mount Mawe (20.2927°S 146.2779°E) 475 metres (1,558 ft)
- Mount Molly Darling (20.5208°S 146.4492°E) 370 metres (1,210 ft)
- Mount Nolan (20.5062°S 146.3660°E) 370 metres (1,210 ft)
- Mount Ross (20.5568°S 146.4349°E) 430 metres (1,410 ft)
- Mount Sebastopol (20.7212°S 146.6964°E) 230 metres (750 ft)
- Mount Sunrise (20.4299°S 146.4352°E) 490 metres (1,610 ft)
- Quinton Hill (21.0987°S 146.8453°E) 210 metres (690 ft)
- Seventy Mile Mountain (20.2439°S 146.3466°E) 435 metres (1,427 ft)

In addition, there were previously two other mountains in the north-west of the locality which no longer exist as they were excavated as part of the Mount Leyshon gold mine:

- the former Mount Leyshon (20.2897°S 146.2736°E) originally 518 metres (1,699 ft)
- the former Golden Horn (20.2911°S 146.2722°E)

The land use is predominantly grazing on native vegetation.

== History ==
Gold was discovered in the area in 1872. The gold mine at Mount Leyshon was developed in 1888.

Mount Leyshon Provisional School opened circa 1890 and became Mount Leyshon State School on 1 January 1909. It closed in 1927 due to low attendances. It reopened in 1930 before finally closing circa 1931.

The Mount Leyshon mine reopened as an open pit mine in 1987 and operated until 2002. During that time, it produced 2.5 million ounces of gold and 2.3 million ounces of silver.

== Demographics ==
In the 2016 census, Seventy Mile had a population of 231 people.

In the 2021 census, Seventy Mile had a population of 204 people.

== Education ==
There are no schools in Seventy Mile.

For students living in the north of the locality, the nearest government primary schools are Millchester State School in Millchester in Charters Towers and Charters Towers Central State School in Charters Towers CBD, while the nearest government secondary school is Charters Towers State High School, also in Charters Towers CBD. There are also non-government schools in Charters Towers.

For students living in the north-east of the locality, the nearest government primary school is Ravenswood State School in Ravenswood to the north-east, but the nearest government secondary schools are in Charters Towers and probably too distant for these students with the options being distance education and boarding school.

For students in other parts of the locality, there are no nearby schools and the options are distance education and boarding school.
