= Campaspe, Queensland =

Campaspe
- Suburb
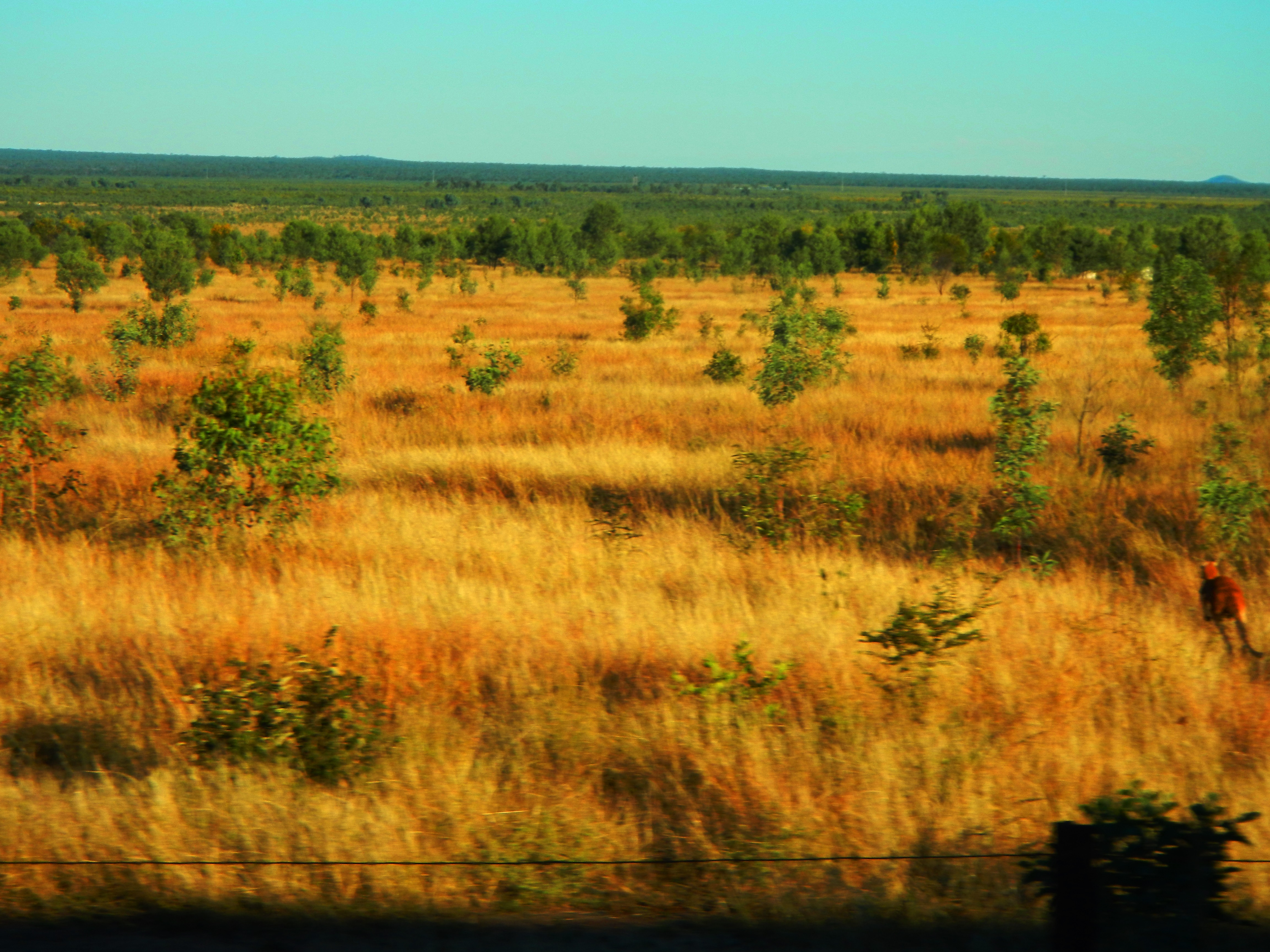
- Campaspe landscape, 2013

- Interactive map of Campaspe
- Coordinates: 20.5919°S 145.9778°E
- Country: Australia
- State: Queensland
- LGA: Charters Towers Region
- Location: 43.4 km (27.0 mi) WSW of Charters Towers; 179 km (111 mi) SW of Townsville; 523 km (325 mi) S of Cairns; 1,343 km (835 mi) NNW of Brisbane

Government
  - State electorate: Traeger
  - Federal division: Kennedy

Area
  - Total: 5,305.3 km^{2} (2,048.4 sq mi)

Population
  - Total: 123 (2021 census)
  - Density: 0.02318/km^{2} (0.06005/sq mi)
- Time zone: UTC+10:00 (AEST)
- Postcode: 4820
Suburbs around Campaspe
Homestead	Basalt	Black Jack
Pentland	Campaspe	Seventy Mile
Pentland	Llanarth	Seventy Mile

Campaspe is a rural locality in the Charters Towers Region, Queensland, Australia. In the 2021 census, Campaspe had a population of 123 people.

There are two neighbourhoods in the north of the locality: Balfes Creek (20.2166°S 145.9091°E) and Powlathanga (20.1833°S 146.0000°E).

== Geography ==
The Cape River flows south-east through a portion of the west of the locality before exiting, then returning to form part of the southern boundary. The Campaspe River flows south-east through the locality before joining the Cape on the southern boundary.

The Flinders Highway runs through the north of the locality, entering from the north-east (Basalt / Black Jack) and exiting to the north-west (Homestead).

The Gregory Highway enters the locality from the north-east (Seventy Mile) and then heads south through the locality, briefly passing through Seventy Mile, and then exiting to south-east (Llanarth). The two highways do not have a junction within Campaspe.

The Great Northern railway line runs mostly immediately south of and parallel to the Flinders Highway, with the following stations within the locality (from west to east):

- Thalanga railway station, now abandoned (20.3060°S 145.7429°E)
- Mungunburra railway station (20.2849°S 145.7829°E)
- Balfes Creek railway station (20.2176°S 145.9083°E)
- Powlathanga railway station, now abandoned (20.1736°S 145.9962°E)

Campaspe has the following mountains (from north to south):

- Mount Bohle (20.2635°S 146.0098°E) 410 metres (1,350 ft)
- Mount Glengalder (20.2902°S 145.6848°E) 450 metres (1,480 ft)
- Mount Windsor (20.3399°S 146.1594°E) 581 metres (1,906 ft)
- Mount Trafalgar (20.4704°S 145.9189°E) 325 metres (1,066 ft)
- Mount Redan (20.5065°S 145.9801°E) 437 metres (1,434 ft)
- Three Sisters Hill (20.6106°S 146.3312°E)
- Mount Raglan (20.6384°S 146.2961°E) 336 metres (1,102 ft)
- Mount Malakoff (20.6855°S 146.1805°E) 388 metres (1,273 ft)
- Mount Bellevue (20.6948°S 146.3472°E) 276 metres (906 ft)

== History ==
The former railway station of Balfes Creek, on the Great Northern railway line, which was opened in 1884, was in the locality. A 1,132 metres (3,714 ft) crossing loop is located in the immediate vicinity.

In 1942, work started on the construction of an airfield at Balfes Creek for defence purposes. An earth strip running parallel to the road and railway was cleared and levelled, but defence priorities changed and it was never sealed.

== Demographics ==
In the 2016 census, Campaspe had a population of 123 people.

In the 2021 census, Campaspe had a population of 123 people.

== Education ==
There are no schools in Campaspe. The nearest government primary schools are Homestead State School in neighbouring Homestead to the north-west and Charters Towers Central State School in Charters Towers City to the north-west. The nearest government secondary school is Charters Towers State High School, also in Charters Towers City. However, due to the size of the locality of Campaspe, only those living in the northern part of the locality would be able to access these schools on a daily basis. The southern parts of the locality would be too distant and the alternatives would be distance education and boarding schools.
