= Lake Galilee (Queensland) =

Lake in Queensland, Australia

- Location within Queensland
- Location: Galilee, 76 km (47 mi) North East of Aramac, Queensland
- Coordinates: 22.3325°S 145.8230°E
- Type: Semi-arid, salt lake
- Catchment area: Cooper Creek catchment
- Basin countries: Lake Eyre Basin, Australia
- Max. length: 36 km (22 mi)
- Max. width: 12.5 km (7.8 mi)
- Surface area: ~25,700 hectares (64,000 acres)
- Max. depth: <2 metres (6 ft 7 in)
- Surface elevation: 279 m (915 ft)

Lake Galilee is a semi-arid salt lake in the locality of Galilee, Barcaldine Region, within the Desert Uplands area of Central West Queensland, Australia. The lake is about 36 kilometres long, up to 12.5 kilometres wide and covers approximately 25,700 hectares.

Lake Galilee is registered on the Directory of Important Wetlands in Australia (DIWA) and provides an important refuge and breeding site for waterbirds. It has been identified by BirdLife International as an Important Bird Area (IBA) because it regularly supports over 1% of the world populations of freckled ducks and grey teals. and possibly more than 1% of the world population of other waterbirds and shorebirds.

The weed Parkinsonia is posing as an environmental threat to the lake as are feral animals, grazing impacts and tourism pressures. The group of property owners adjacent to the lake are working with local natural resource management groups (Desert Uplands Committee and Desert Channels Queensland) to manage these threats.

== Description ==
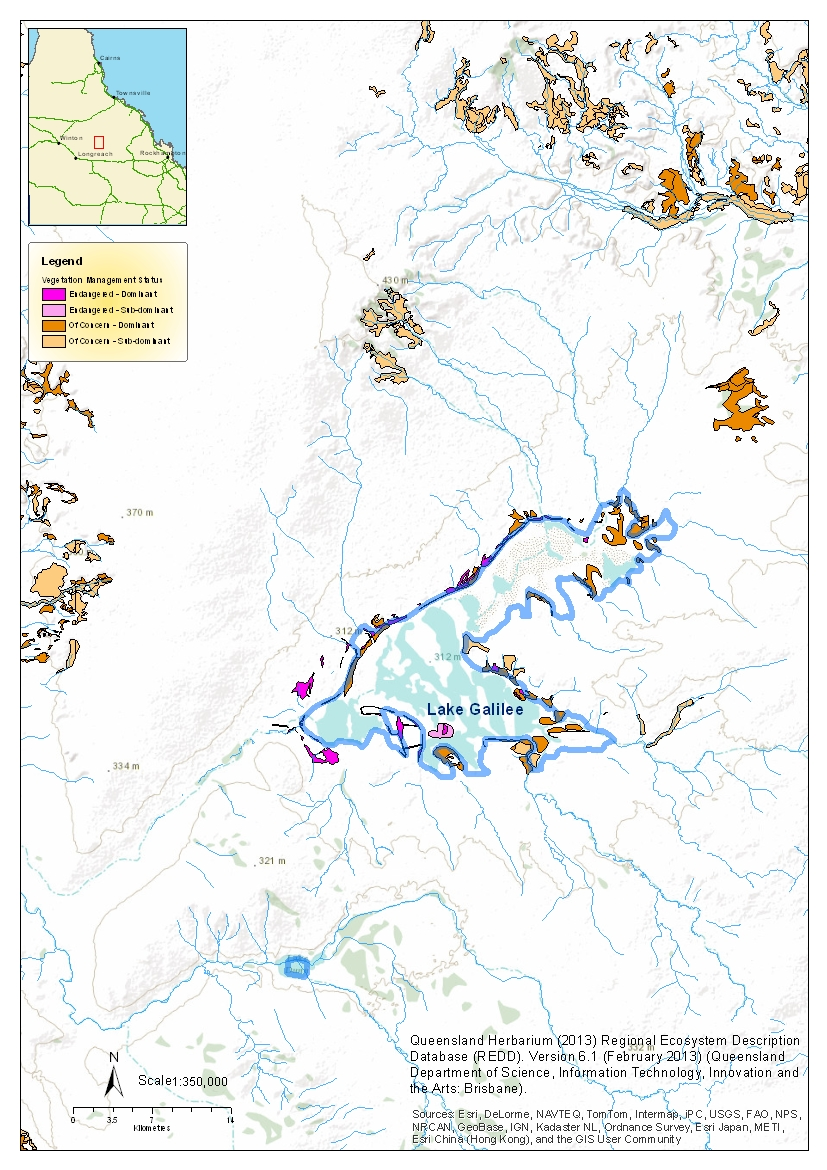
Lake Galilee (Qld) Map showing location and vegetation management status.

Lake Galilee is a semi-arid, saline, playa tectonic, depressional lake at Galilee, about 76 kilometres north-east of Aramac, in Central West Queensland. It is located in a shallow closed basin bordered by the Great Dividing Range to the west and north. The 255,480 hectare catchment is a closed, internally draining basin, which is fed by some 20 seasonal streams. It is in the Desert Uplands bioregion, the Lake Eyre Basin drainage division, being included within the Thomson River catchment of the Cooper Basin.

The lake covers approximately 25,700 hectares with a perimeter of 236.7 kilometres. It extends 36 km in a northeast-southwest direction, and is up to 12.5 km wide, with a maximum depth of less than two metres. It has a complex shoreline characterised by many small bays. There are three large islands to the south formed by partial infilling by alluvial sands and clays, which have been carried in by numerous streams.

The water is fresh when full but becomes brackish from leached terrestrial salts as it dries. Water varies from fresh and milky coloured when recently inundated and well into the dry season, to hyposaline in the deepest, southern parts of the lake, which take the longest to dry out. The northern half of the lake is more persistently fresh. Lake Galilee falls within the 508 to 610 mm isohyets, with the rain predominantly falling in the summer months from December to March. However, in 2010 there was over 1,000 mm in the catchment.

Together with the smaller Lake Buchanan to the north, Lake Galilee represents a rare type of lake in Australia. Both lake basins represent tectonic depressions created by movements deep in the earth's crust; they have relatively small catchments and are bordered by the Great Dividing Range.

Wind-borne clay, silt and sand have formed accompanying low fringing dunes, known as lunettes, around the lake. Landforms and vegetation may be exposed or covered by water depending on depth of water. Diversity and complexity are likely to be greatest when the lake is below maximum depth but above half-full depth.

== Wetland management profile ==
Semi-arid saline lakes occur in internal (closed) drainage basins where the annual average rainfall is less than 500 mm. Water supply is mainly from the creeks of local catchments with infrequent major rain events providing most of the inflows. In-flowing water is invariably fresh, but becomes brackish or saline over time as the lake dries out.

Salinity is due to the pre-existence of salts in the soil and weathered bedrock, and salinity levels range from low (hyposaline) to high (hypersaline). Only a few lakes are distinctly saline for most of the wetting and drying cycle and a single lake may exhibit a mix of both fresh and saline water conditions at one time depending on its topography and the location of the tributaries that carry water into the lake.

The characteristic landform of an almost flat, shallow, terminal lakebed in an arid and semi-arid zone is commonly called a playa. In dry times, playas consist of cracking clay flats that can be crusted and hardened to varying degrees depending on their substrate and position in the landscape, and sometimes might be covered in a thin layer of soluble salt deposits. Some lakebeds are devoid of vegetation, but others support diverse communities of forbs and grasses as they dry out, which make them a valuable potential grazing resource. When they contain water, arid and semi-arid lakes can also support highly productive aquatic plant beds and algal turfs that are an important component of the food chain.

This profile covers the habitat types of a wetland termed semi-arid saline lake, located on cattle grazing properties in the Desert Uplands bioregion of Central West Queensland. It highlights the steps being taken to preserve the biodiversity and natural heritage.

=== Wetland habitats ===
This large lake has six major wetland habitats and include:

1. Dry saline clay flats which are seasonally flooded;
2. Fringing saline flats on the edges of the lake floor covered by low samphire bushes;
3. Sandy beaches around the edge of the lake, supporting a woodland of beefwood, other grevilleas, sally wattle and ironwood (Acacia excelsa);
4. Red dunes around the southern part of the lake with gidgee woodland;
5. Freshwater swamps behind the dunes, with coolabahs and;
6. Fringing areas of open wattle scrub in the saline flood zone.

=== Rare and threatened ecosystems ===
Regional ecosystems are assigned a conservation status based on their current extent in a particular bioregion. This status affords the regional ecosystem a level of protection from vegetation clearing. Regional ecosystems are classified as endangered if the area of remnant vegetation for the regional ecosystem is less than 10% of the pre-clearing extent of the regional ecosystem or the area of remnant vegetation for the regional ecosystem is 10% to 30% of the pre-clearing extent of the regional ecosystem and less than 10,000 hectares.

Out of the 52 regional ecosystems represented in the Lake Galilee catchment, the eight (listed below), are considered endangered.

1. Palustrine wetland. Mostly water or bare ground. Scattered forbs and grasses including Sclerolaena spp. may occur during dry periods. Occurs on infrequently flooded alluvial plains or fringing sandy closed depressions. (BVG1M: 34d) (10.3.16d);
2. Ironwood +/- beefwood low open woodland on lake fringing dunes over a calcrete hardpan adjacent to lake (10.3.17a);
3. Gidgee woodlands on lakeside dunes (10.3.19). This ecosystem is an unusual occurrence, having significant geomorphic values indicative of past climates. It is endemic to Lake Galilee. The deep fine sandy topsoils have very low fertility and are extremely susceptible to wind erosion. It is largely cleared for pasture development. Remnants are heavy infested with buffel grass. In December 2006, remnant extent was < 10,000 ha and 10–30% of the pre-clearing area remained, endangered under the VMA (Vegetation Management Act) and the Biodivstat;
4. False sandalwood low open woodland on alluvial plains (10.3.25);
5. Brigalow and blackbutt low forests grassy or shrubby woodlands (10.4.3a);
6. Blackbutt open woodland on Cainozoic lake beds (10.4.3b);
7. Blackbutt open woodland on Mesozoic sediments (10.9.3a);
8. Brigalow woodland on Mesozoic sediments (10.9.3b).

The Regional Ecosystem Description Database (REDD) lists the Biodiversity Status and the Vegetation Management Class (VM class) of each regional ecosystem.

A further 13 regional ecosystems are “Of Concern”

=== Nationally important wetland ===
Breeding colonies
Common name	Scientific name
Black swan	Cygnus atratus
Australian pelican	Pelicanus conspicillatus
Little black cormorant	Phalacrocorax sulcirostris
Great egret	Ardea modesta
Straw-necked ibis	Threskiornis spinicollis
Royal spoonbill	Platalea regia
Caspian tern	Hydroprogne caspia
Silver gull	Chroicocephalus novaehollandiae

Lake Galilee is registered on the Directory of Important Wetlands in Australia (DIWA). The criteria for determining these nationally important wetlands are agreed to by the Australian and New Zealand Environment and Conservation Council (ANZECC) Wetlands Network in 1994.

Lake Galilee fulfilled four of the six criteria for inclusion as follows. It is a good example of a seasonal/intermittent saline lake with seasonal/intermittent freshwater ponds and marshes on inorganic soils in the Desert Uplands Region. It plays an important role in the natural functioning of a major wetland complex. It plays an important role in the natural functioning of a major wetland complex. It is important habitat for animal taxa at a vulnerable stage in their life cycles, or provides a refuge when adverse conditions such as drought prevail. It supports native plants, animals and ecological communities considered endangered or vulnerable at the national level.

== Vegetation ==
There are large areas of samphires (Halosarcia spp.) in broad margins across the lake bed and on islands. Samphires are succulent, perennial erect or spreading shrubs to one metre tall, often growing in waterlogged and saline areas. They belong on the Chenopod family so are related to saltbushes and bluebushes. Stems and branches are green to reddish-purple, and made up of numerous articulated segments. They do not have obvious leaves; flowers are minute and grow in rows at the base of the fruiting segments.

Only young plants may be palatable to animals as they accumulate salt over time. They also act as sediment and nutrient traps and stabilise the lake edge. While they are capable of withstanding harsh climatic conditions, they are easily destroyed by physical trampling.

Other flora species found in the Lake Galilee area include cane grass (Eragrostis australasica) which is extensive in the northern half. Belalie forms tall open shrubland or low woodland in parts of the northern half and in south-eastern bays. The weed parkinsonia occurs extensively together with Belalie in dense thickets in the south-east inlets; Sesbania thickets occur in the northern lake bed and on southern islands, dense marshes of ribbed spike-rush (Eleocharis plana) with aquatics such as Monochoria cyanea and nardoo under shrubs in some south-eastern inlets and creeks. Some of the lake bed is bare.

== Birdlife ==
Abundant waterbirds
Common name	Scientific name
Grey teal	Anas gibberifrons
Pacific black duck	Anas superciliosa
Hardhead	Aythya australis
Pink-eared duck	Malacorhynchus membranaceus
Australian wood duck	Chenonetta jubata
Australasian shoveler	Anas rhynchotis
Eurasian coot	Fulica atra
Australian pelican	Pelicanus conspicillatus
Little black cormorant	Phalacrocorax sulcirostris
Great egret	Ardea modesta
Australian white ibis	Threskiornis molucca
Straw-necked ibis	Threskiornis spinicollis
Royal spoonbill	Platalea regia
Brolga	Grus rubicunda
Sharp-tailed sandpiper	Calidris acuminata
Red-kneed dotterel	Erythrogonys cinctus

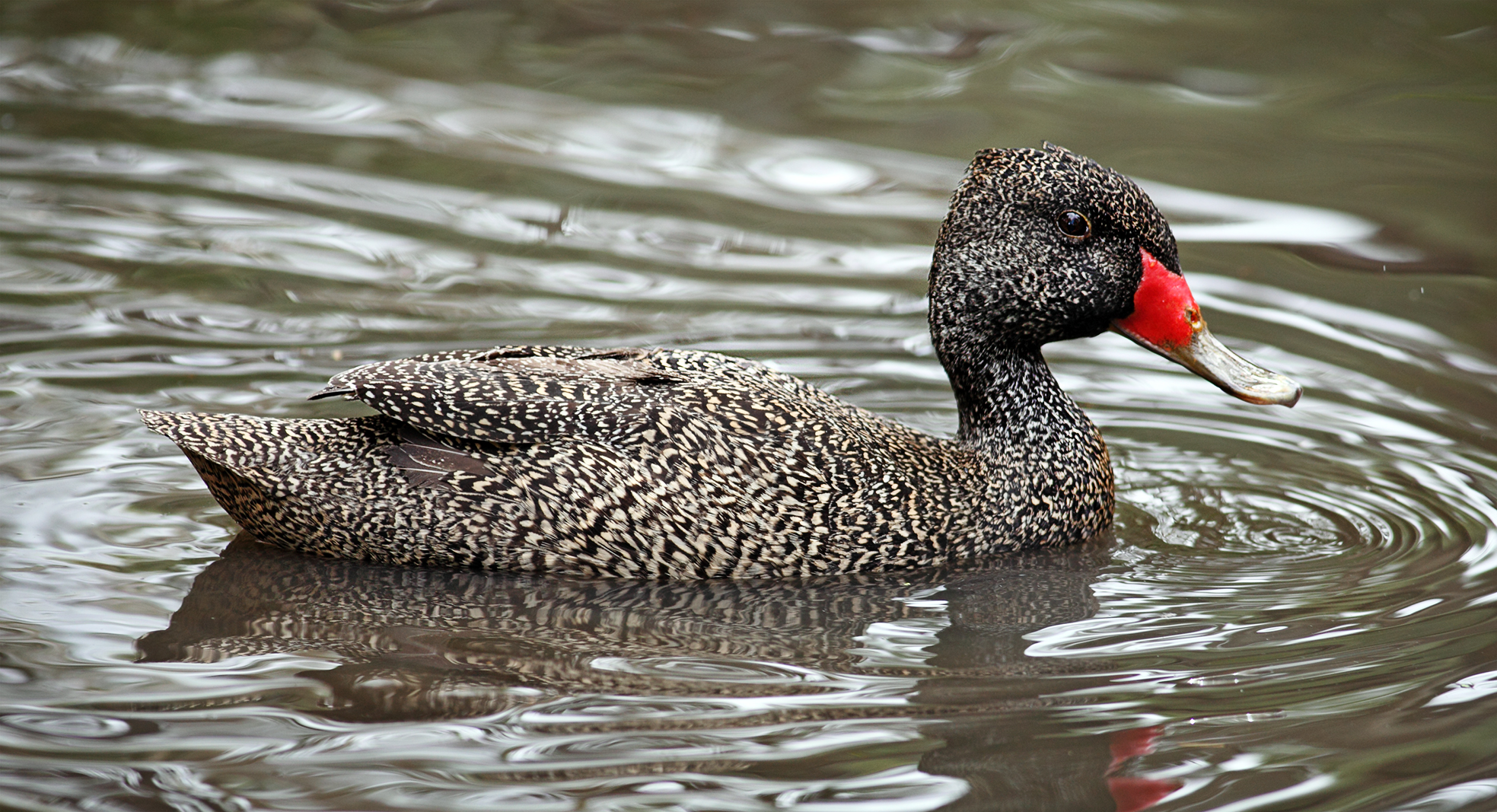
The lake is an important site for freckled ducks

Lake Galilee represents a rare type of lake in Australia and provides an important refuge and breeding site for waterbirds. Periodically, high numbers of waterbirds occur, ranging from small-bodied species such as grey teal, freckled duck and pink-eared duck, to large species such as Australian pelican, black swan, waders and spoonbills. The bird populations fluctuate with changing water levels.

Birdlife Australia recognizes Lake Galilee as an Important bird areas (IBA) as it regularly supports more than 1% of the world population of freckled duck and grey teal and occasionally may support more than 1% of the world population of other waterbirds and shorebirds.

A 2008 Wetlands International/ ANU bird survey of Lake Galilee found that the two habitats which support the most breeding waterbirds, are the inundated groves of belalie Acacia stenophylla and dry islands. The inundated belalie groves supported three mixed-species colonies of spoonbills, egrets, ibises and cormorants, ranging from a few tens to several hundreds of active nests. The dry islands supported two colonies of Caspian terns and/or gulls with up to 40 nests, and colonies of breeding pelicans, the largest of which had 2,200 breeding pairs.

=== Migratory waterbirds ===
Birds are listed as migratory species under the Environment Protection Biodiversity Conservation Act 1999 (EPBC Act), if they are listed under the Japan - Australia (JAMBA) and China - Australia (CAMBA) Migratory Bird Agreements and the Bonn Convention.

Migratory waterbirds make round trip migrations of up to 26,000 km each year between their breeding grounds in the Northern Hemisphere and their non-breeding areas in the south. These trips are made in several weeks, with brief stops at staging sites along the way to rest and refuel for the next leg of their journey.

The corridor through which these waterbirds migrate is known as the East Asian - Australasian Flyway (the Flyway) . It extends from within the Arctic Circle, through East and South-east Asia, to Australia and New Zealand. Stretching across 22 countries, it is one of eight major waterbird flyways recognised around the globe.

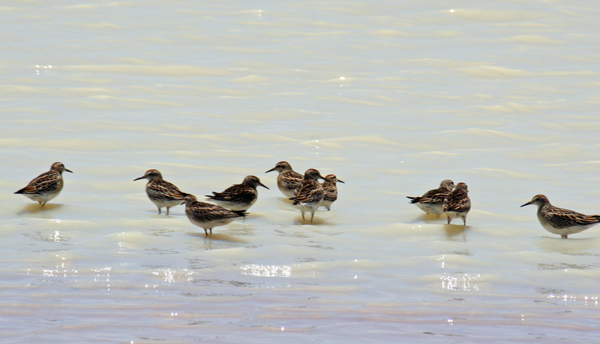
Sharp-tailed sandpipers were recorded in a survey at the lake

Roger Jaensch conducted an aerial bird survey by helicopter around the lake in August 1998 (unpublished) and recorded at least 56,000 individual waterbirds at a series of shallow water bodies in the southern bed of the lake.

Resident shorebirds
Common name	Scientific name
Red-capped plover	Charadrius ruficapillus
Red-kneed dotterel	Erythrogonys cinctus

While five Asian-breeding shorebirds listed under the EPBC Act were recorded at Lake Galilee during a survey conducted by Jaensch and Reid (2008) for Wetlands International in collaboration with Australian National University. They include godwit, marsh sandpiper, common greenshank, sharp-tailed sandpiper and pectoral sandpiper.

The survey in May 2008 also recorded 50 species and at least 20,000 individuals and confirming the international-level importance of Lake Galilee in terms of numbers of waterbirds supported. This survey also discovered internationally important numbers (at least 1% of the Flyway population) of sharp-tailed sandpiper across the four main wetlands of the Desert Uplands bioregion; Lakes Galilee, Buchanan and Dunn and Cauckingburra Swamp.

Migratory shorebirds
Common name	Scientific name
Black-tailed godwit	Limosa limosa
Marsh sandpiper	Tringa stagnatilis
Common greenshank	Tringa nebularia
Sharp-tailed sandpiper	Calidris acuminata
Pectoral sandpiper	Calidris melanotos

== Other fauna (animals) ==
Bony bream Nematolosa erebi occur at low salinities and frogs occur when the lakes are over-full.

Invertebrates occur in low diversity, but in high abundance at middle salinities (they vary with salinity) and include Ostracods or seed shrimps (e.g. Mytilocypris splendida), Copepods (e.g. Boeckella triarticulata), Cladocerans (e.g., water flea Daphnia queenslandensis) some insects (e.g. Tanytarsus barbitarsis) and the Mollusc (Coxiella sp.)

== Pastoral settlement history ==
Pastoral settlement began on the eastern side of Lake Galilee in 1877, when Charles Bowly acquired the Oakley run and stocked it with cattle. The following year he also acquired the “Northmere”, “Powala”, “Eastmere”, “Westmere” and “Southmere” runs with “Eastland” being added in 1883. Together these runs were named “Eastmere” Station.

Charles Bowly later regretted having invested in cattle. He wrote to the daughter of Robert Christison, his first employer:

“I, to my regret, got tired of sheep and wanted to ride after cattle. I sold out with 6000 cattle and 220 horses after going through five droughts and working for 21 years for the Bank, got £6000 left after 21 years hard work and hard living too, and that is Queensland.”

Uncommon birds
Common name	Scientific name
Freckled duck	Sticonetta naevosa
Great-crested grebe	Podiceps cristatus
Black-tailed godwit	Limosa limosa
Pectoral sandpiper	Calidris melanotos

The new owners of “Eastmere” reached the same conclusion and began introducing sheep two years after purchase and had completely changed to sheep in 1913. Charles Bowly was fortunate in selling when he did. The cattle tick invaded the district soon afterwards, killing up to 50% of cattle on some properties. In 1899 the worst drought Queensland had ever experienced set in, and by the time it broke in 1903, 80% of cattle in the district had died.

Cattle were reintroduced in very different market conditions in the 1950s and sheep were removed from “Eastmere” in 1966. Over the years other properties were taken up around the lake including “Fleetwood” to the north and west, “Lake Dunn” to the west, and “Clare” and Clunies Creek” – now “Clunievale” - to the south. “Eastmere” first pulled (cleared trees) in 1967, while “Fleetwood” first pulled in 1963. (The clearing of trees is a method of increasing productivity and sustainability of pastoral grazing enterprises in the Desert Uplands).

In the early 2000s a biodiversity audit suggested some concern about over-clearing in some ecosystems and said, "the most quantifiable threatening process is broad scale tree clearing", although data collated for 1999 indicated that 87% of the bioregion remained uncleared.

Buffel grass was introduced into the Desert Uplands bioregion the late 1960s. Many pastoralists regard it highly because in many situations it greatly increases pasture productivity for cattle. However, it is also widely seen as having negative environmental impacts through competition with native species and changes to fire regimes [4].

Many ecosystems in the Desert Uplands are being invaded by buffel grass, which forms a dense monoculture therefore decreasing the biodiversity of ecosystems Another aspect of invasion by buffel grass is that this plant species is very phosphorus- and nitrogen-dependent and a long term run down of phosphorus in the already phosphorus deficient soils of the Desert Uplands may occur leading to a further loss of native plant species.

In 1995, the Desert Uplands Build-up and Development Committee was established and has worked with landholders to enhance grazing and ecological sustainability, enterprise profitability and community resilience.

== Cultural heritage ==
All wetland ecosystems are of material and cultural importance to Indigenous people and many will have profound cultural significance and values. The Indigenous peoples of inland Queensland have strong cultural associations with arid and semi-arid lakes (fresh and salt) dating back thousands of years. Lakes were important for Indigenous peoples of the arid and semi-arid interior, providing seasonal water, food and other material resources, as well as having ceremonial and spiritual values.

Miyan (Mian) is a language of North/Central Queensland.The Miyan language region includes the landscape within the local government boundaries of the Central Highlands Regional Council, including the localities of Mt Douglas, Bulliwallah and Lake Galilee.

There are more than 80 Indigenous cultural heritage sites recorded in association with arid and semi-arid lakes in Queensland. However, most arid and semi-arid zone lakes have not been systematically surveyed or assessed for cultural heritage significance. The information available suggests that there is a greater diversity of evidence of traditional occupation and use associated with temporary arid and semi-arid zone freshwater lakes than with arid and semi-arid salt lakes.

== Threatening processes ==
=== Weeds ===
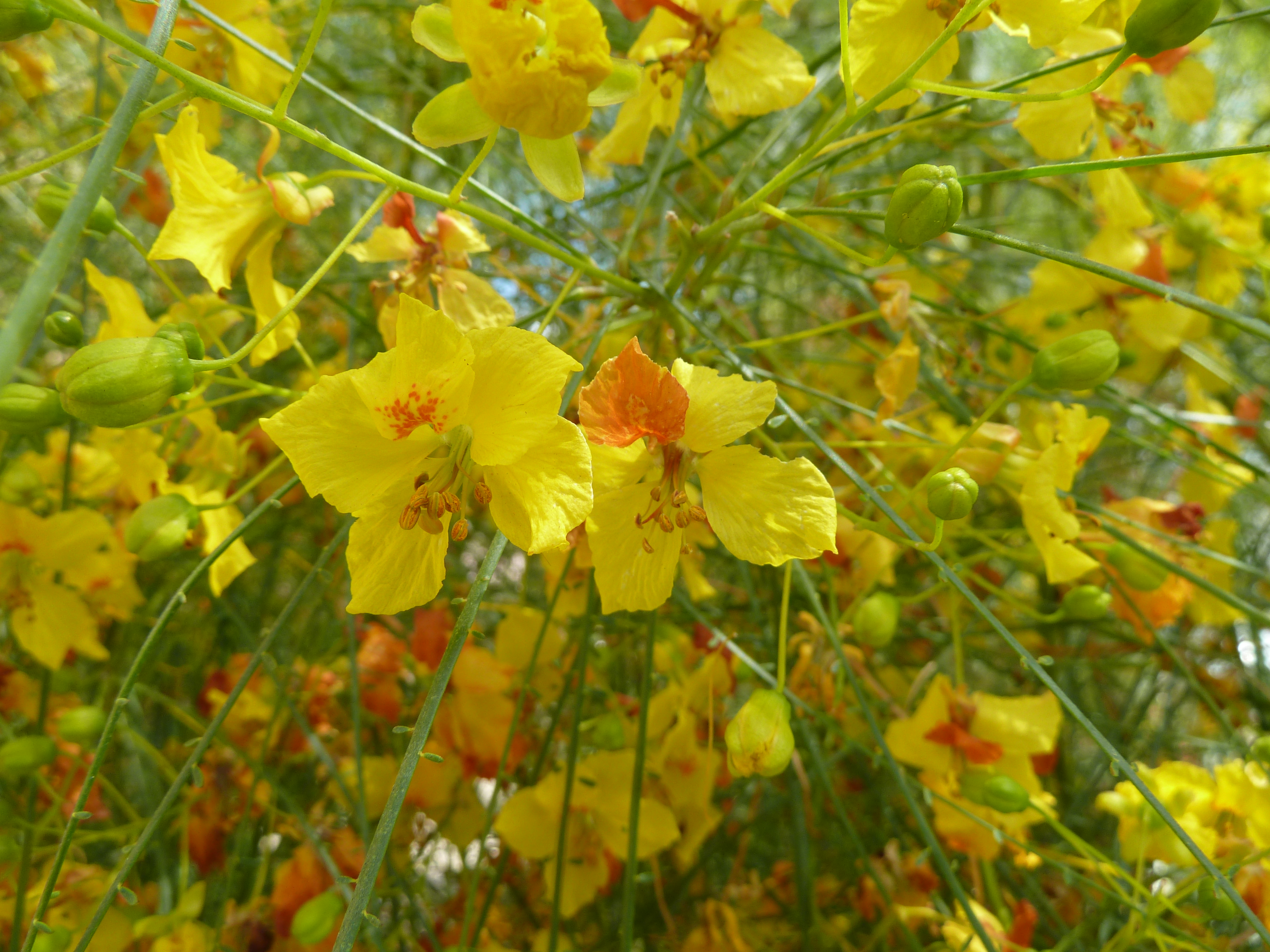
The flowers of Parkinsonia aculeata, an invasive species in Northern Australia.

Parkinsonia and parthenium infestations pose the largest threat to the ecological integrity of this significant wetland.

Parkinsonia forms dense, impenetrable thickets which restrict waterbird access to shoreline feeding and roosting sites, and provide a haven for feral pigs, which in turn disturb waterbird habitats. It is regarded as one of the worst weeds in Australia because of its invasiveness, potential for spread, and economic and environmental impacts. Wetlands are particularly vulnerable because parkinsonia can invade watercourses, cause erosion, lower watertables and take over vast tracts of floodplain. At Lake Galilee it germinates freely on the moist edges of the lake.

Parthenium is an annual herb with a deep taproot and an erect stem that becomes woody with age. It is a vigorous species that colonises weak pastures with sparse ground cover and will readily colonise disturbed, bare areas along roadsides and heavily stocked areas around yards and watering points.

=== Feral animals ===
Disturbance to the wetland areas from pest animals is mainly from pigs. Feral pigs cause damage by disturbing nesting birds, predation on frogs and aquatic species (e.g. mussels) and uprooting lakebed and riparian vegetation. Their role as a host or vector for diseases of cattle such as leptospirosis makes control of feral pigs particularly desirable for landholders and the wider community.

=== Grazing impacts ===
Tree clearing, some overgrazing and the introduction of buffel grass has occurred near the lake in the past and has created some impacts on biodiversity, water quality, erosion and changes in sedimentation and substrate composition. The lake fringes are highly productive and are regularly used for grazing, particularly after spring or early summer rainfall. Constant grazing can damage forbs and grasses that grow naturally on the lake fringes and may create a buffel grass monoculture.

=== Recreation and tourism ===
More and more tourists are venturing into western Queensland and the most preferred campsites are on the edges of lakes and waterholes. Visitors use the riparian timber for campfire fuel, especially hollow branches and logs and over a long period totally degrade habitat for hollow-dwelling fauna such as ducks, parrots, owls, bats and reptiles. Disturbance of nesting birds by human activity in the heat of a summer's day can result in the death of unhatched chicks. Unleashed pet dogs can also be devastating to ground-nesting waterbirds and can also disturb wading birds and ground-dwelling fauna. Some visitors also create new vehicle tracks, which tend to draw others to continually expand their presence and impact. Other issues include the inappropriate disposal of rubbish and human excrement.

== Management ==
The Desert Uplands Committee and the landholders surrounding Lake Galilee produced the Lake Galilee Management Plan 2011–2016. The priority of the management plan and the “Friends of Lake Galilee”* is to significantly reduce the infestations of parkinsonia and parthenium and to maintain the ecological integrity of this significant wetland.

The local natural resource management (NRM) body, Desert Channels Queensland, secured Caring for Country funds for the improved management of the Lake Galilee catchment through implementation of the management plan. Management actions carried out by the “Friends of Lake Galilee” include chemical treatment of weed infestations, trials of biological controls for weeds, signage for a tourist information centre and erosion control work. To date, their pro-active pest control actions have reduced the weed infestations to half the area. The “Friends of Lake Galilee” group includes the landholders and managers of seven properties surrounding Lake Galilee: Oakvale, Oaketokes, Fleetwood, Lake Dunn, Swanlea, Eastmere and Hazelmere.

=== Weed management ===
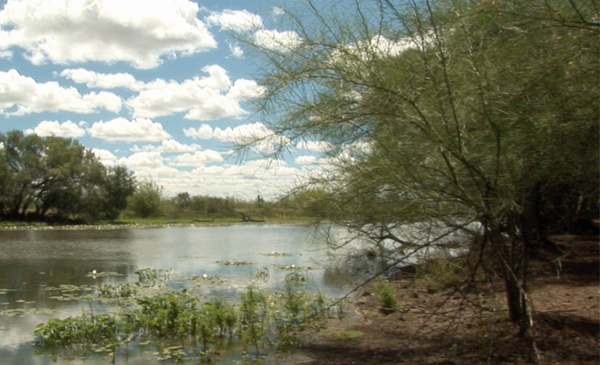
Parkinsonia on the lake's edge

Invasive weeds are the biggest threat to the ecological values of Lake Galilee, which has the largest infestation of parkinsonia known in Australia. It covers approximately 5,000 hectares around the entire edge of the lake. Parthenium is also an issue in and adjacent to the catchment. There are also small infestations of rubber vine and mother-of-millions that are being closely monitored and managed. Parkinsonia, parthenium and rubber vine are listed as Weeds of National Significance (WONS) and as declared Class 2 pest plants under Pest and Stock Route Management Act 2002. Management of weeds in the Lake Galilee catchment is a major priority for the landholders in the catchment.

==== Parkinsonia ====
The current infestation possibly stems from one parkinsonia tree that was planted in the garden of the “Eastmere” homestead in the late 1800s. It has been spread around the lake's edge during various flood events (e.g. 1974, 1991, 2008, 2010), receding floodlines and prevailing winds. The parkinsonia is currently in several stages of treatment and ranges in size of infestation from large, dense clumps of trees; to thickets of small trees; to isolated plants and mats of seedlings. Weed control is effective only in the summer (wet season) when the plants are growing and not in a stressed physiological state.

As the prevailing wind is from the south-eastern edges of the lake towards the north and west, the “Friends of Lake Galilee” group decided it was best to control the southern and eastern infestations first as they are “source infestations”. Some landholders have spent years controlling parkinsonia with some properties now being relatively clean. Of the “Friends of Lake Galilee” group six landholders have parkinsonia on their properties and two of the six also have parthenium.

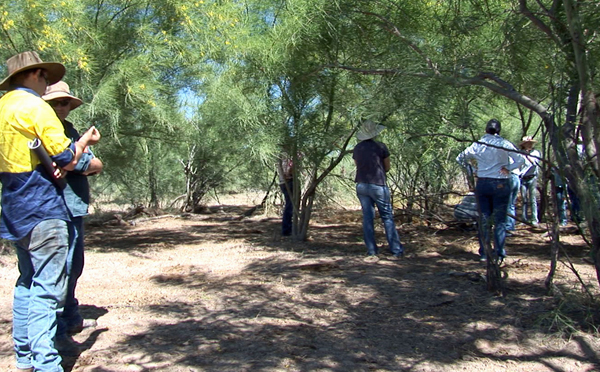
Parkinsonia Field Day at Lake Galilee

Six are implementing five-year pest management plans. Their aim is to eradicate parthenium and to contain and eradicate, if possible, the source infestations of parkinsonia around the lake. As well as funded weed projects, landholders have carried out additional control works from their own resources. Chemical methods of control have included:

- nonselective, broad spectrum herbicides for larger trees where there are no native trees;
- trialling aerial applications of herbicides for thick infestations;
- cut-stump and basal barking with a mix of herbicide and diesel for less dense thickets; and
- foliar spraying for seedlings.

The 2011–2012 Caring For Our Country funding has enabled the participating landholders to tackle 620 hectares of parkinsonia, which is approximately twelve per cent of the total mapped infestation area around the lake. Combined with the additional control works carried out by landholders it is estimated that the parkinsonia infestation is now down to half its original mapped area. Other control methods and chemicals are being used and trialed with varying degrees of success and the best methods for different circumstances are yet to be determined.

Fungus inoculation trials are being conducted on “Eastmere” and other properties further north. Capsules containing a fungus that causes dieback in parkinsonia are inserted into a hole drilled into the base of the tree. Early results have been mixed, but Desert Channels Queensland and researchers are working with landholders to assess the potential of using fungus inoculation to control parkinsonia.

==== Parthenium ====
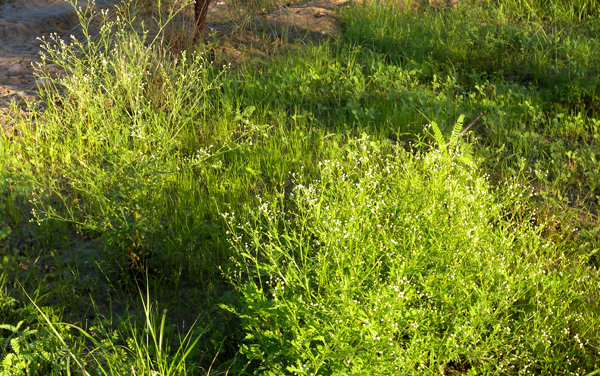
Parthenium weed at Lake Galilee (Queensland)

Parthenium was transported into the Lake Galilee area from the north with cattle during drought times. About 430 hectares of parthenium exists on one property and one hectare on another property about 10 km upstream (north) of the lake. Because of its potential to spread around the lake edge and across the lakebed, the main aim is to prevent parthenium reaching the lake and to have the infestation completely controlled within five years. The 2011–2012 Caring For Our Country funding has also enabled landholders to control 12 kilometres of parthenium along streambanks using a selective herbicide for the control of broadleaved weeds.

=== Feral animals ===
Hunting, trapping and baiting activities reduce the numbers of pigs to some degree and all property managers surrounding the lake are actively engaged in pest management. Some landholders have found that the extreme drought years have the biggest effect on reducing pig numbers.

=== Habitat restoration, land and agricultural management ===
The grazing properties surrounding Lake Galilee manage grazing pressure through stocking rates. Some fencing has been erected and alternative watering points have been placed adjacent to the lake to provide better quality water for stock and reduce trampling impacts at the lake edge.

Fencing of the whole lake area at this stage is not considered an economic proposition or a high priority for protection of the ecological values of the area; especially given the saline nature of the water and its corrosive effect on fencing materials.

Grazing management practices are already promoted in the Desert Uplands via a number of initiatives including a group of graziers using the International Standards for Environmental Management (ISO 14001) and a Natural Heritage Trust project sponsored through the Desert Uplands Development and Build-up Strategy group promoting on-ground nature conservation.

Other management actions carried out by the ‘Friends of Lake Galilee’ include signage for a tourist information centre (to control public access to the lake from stock route adjacent to Hazelmere Station); construction of bollards; a parking area; an information shelter and erosion control work.

=== Tourism and recreation ===
To help look after Lake Galilee and its important waterbird habitats, tourists are encouraged to camp at Lake Dunn (commonly known as “The Lake”); it lies about 30 km to the southwest of Lake Galilee and is a popular bird watching and tourist spot.

It is a much smaller lake with facilities such as powered and unpowered camping sites and two small chalets available for hire. Water activities include swimming, water skiing, windsurfing and fishing.

Because of the presence of a caretaker and Lake Dunn's smaller size and more accessible shoreline, it is easier to manage tourism impacts.

== Knowledge gaps ==
As with all other wetland systems in the Desert Uplands bioregion, only limited monitoring systems are in place; although Lake Galilee was amongst the four most important wetland systems counted in annual aerial surveys across south-east Australia in 1988, 1989, 1993, 1997 (estimated 62,000 waterbirds) but systematic surveys combining aerial and ground surveys have only been undertaken in 1998 and 2008.

Other surveys and monitoring not yet carried out at Lake Galilee are aquatic ecology base-line surveys, followed by five to ten year monitoring.

== See also ==
- Lake Yamma Yamma
- List of lakes of Australia
