= Pentland, Queensland =

Pentland
- Town
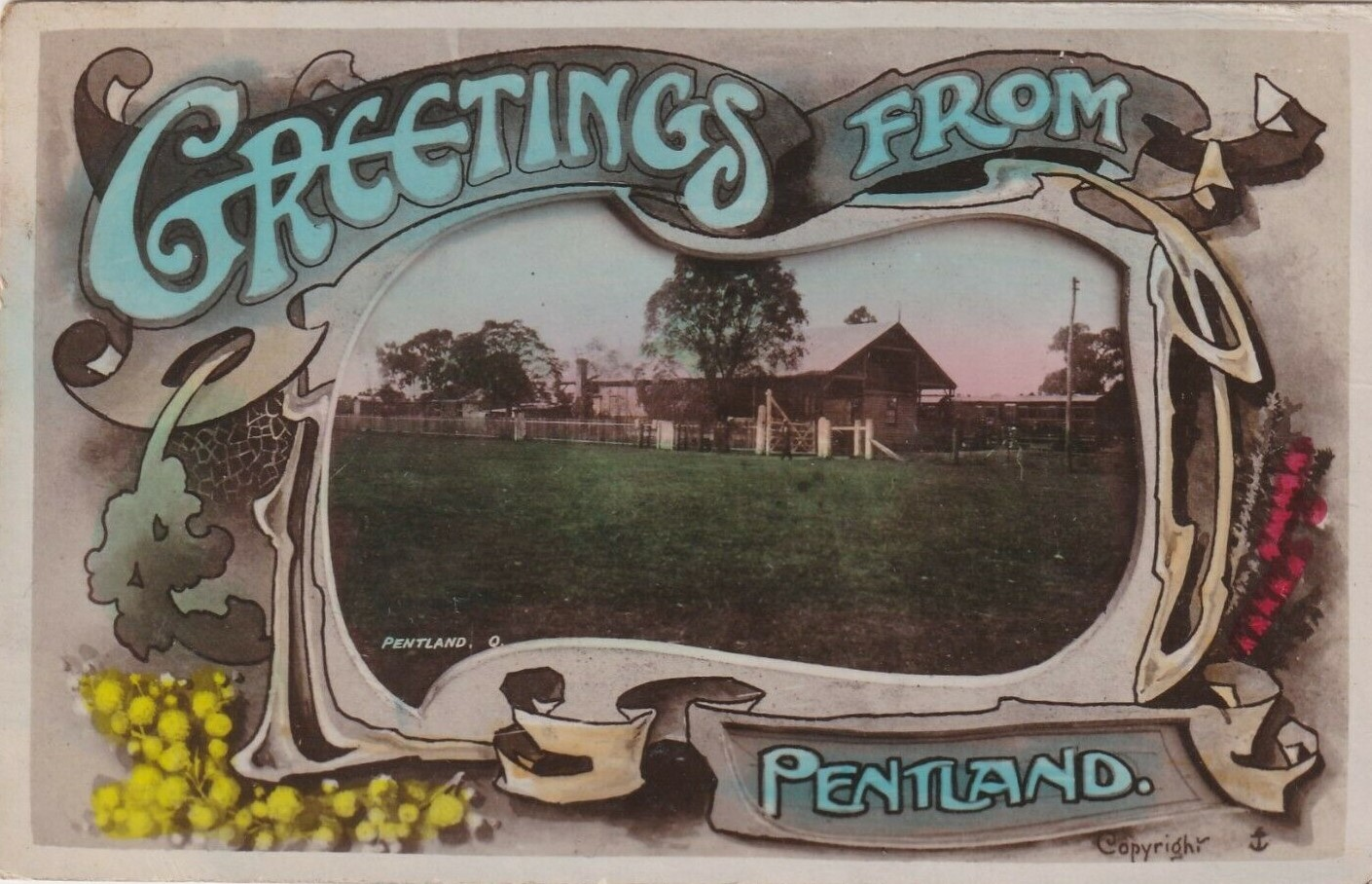
- Postcard showing Pentland railway station, 1909

- Interactive map of Pentland
- Coordinates: 20.5227°S 145.3991°E
- Country: Australia
- State: Queensland
- Region: North Queensland
- LGA: Charters Towers Region
- Location: 107 km (66 mi) SW of Charters Towers; 242 km (150 mi) SW of Townsville; 1,406 km (874 mi) NW of Brisbane

Government
  - State electorate: Traeger
  - Federal division: Kennedy

Area
  - Total: 14,979.5 km^{2} (5,783.6 sq mi)

Population
  - Total: 248 (2021 census)
  - Density: 0.01656/km^{2} (0.04288/sq mi)
- Time zone: UTC+10:00 (AEST)
- Postcode: 4816
Localities around Pentland
Porcupine	Basalt	Homestead
Torrens Creek	Pentland	Campaspe
Aramac	Laglan	Llanarth; Belyando

Pentland is a rural town and locality in the Charters Towers Region, Queensland, Australia. In the 2021 census, the locality of Pentland had a population of 248 people.

== Geography ==
Pentland is located between Charters Towers and Hughenden.

In the east, a small section of the Campaspe River flows through Pentland. White Mountains National Park has been established in the north. The Cape River rises in the area. In the south is the salt lake known as Lake Buchanan.

The Flinders Highway passes through Pentland (both town and locality) from east to west, as does the Great Northern railway line. The locality is served by the following railway stations (from west to east):

- Burra railway station (20.7338°S 145.1857°E)
- Warrigal railway station (20.6521°S 145.2722°E)
- Pentland railway station, serving the town (20.5252°S 145.3986°E)
- Cape River railway station, now abandoned (20.4714°S 145.4818°E)
- Kimburra railway station, now abandoned (20.4495°S 145.5214°E)

The former town of Capeville (20.4511°S 145.3731°E) on the Cape River is within the locality of Pentland approximately 10 kilometres (6.2 mi) NNW of the town of Pentland.

Within the town, the Flinders Highway is also known as Main Street.

== History ==
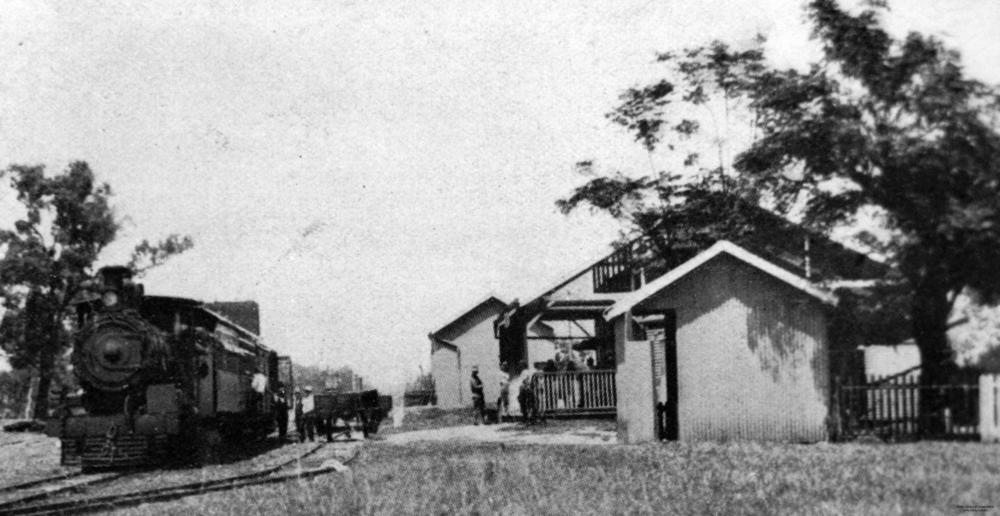
Train at Pentland railway station in 1929

The Cape River goldfields opened in July 1867 on the advice of geologist Richard Daintree. By 1870 there were over 20,000 men working the goldfield but by 1873, the population of Capeville had reduced to about 30.

There was a telegraph office from 1880 to 1884.

Bett's Creek Post Office opened on 7 October 1884. It was renamed Pentland in 1885.

The Great Northern Railway opened to Pentland on 6 October 1884.

Pentland Provisional School opened on 11 May 1885. On 1 January 1909, it became Pentland State School.

Oakvale Provisional School opened in 1902 and closed in 1907.

The Soldiers Memorial Hall was opened on Saturday 24 April 1926 by Mrs Lydia Pilcher, who had four sons in the military in World War I, one of whom, Ernest Sydney Pilcher, died of wounds in 1918.

Cape River State School opened on 25 October 1915 and closed in 1938.

Pentland Meatworks (also known as Cape River Meatworks) was opened in 1943 to meet the additional needs of Australian and American forces arriving in North Queensland during World War II. The end of the war in 1945 meant the army no longer had a need for the facility, after which it had a number of changes of ownership. The meatworks saw the township of Pentland thrive. The meatworks eventually closed in September 1989.

In 1964, St Mary's Catholic Church opened in Pentland. It was relocated from Sellheim where it was built in 1906.

In the early 1970s, there were two grocery stores and the Pentland State School had around 70 enrolled students, the town pool was opened and the town's only hotel, the Pentland Hotel Motel was renovated.

In 2009, the locality of Pentland was expanded to include the discontinued localities of The Cape, Buchanan and Torrens Creek.

The 2013 Australian Federal Government budget included funds for a feasibility study on "the potential to develop land for sugarcane production, milling, ethanol and cogeneration infrastructure in the Pentland region."

On Wednesday 25 April (Anzac Day) 2018, a war memorial was officially opened at the Soldiers Memorial Hall as part of the Centenary of World War I. The memorial commemorates all who have served and died in Australia's military forces.

== Demographics ==
In the 2016 census, the locality of Pentland had a population of 306 people.

In the 2021 census, the locality of Pentland had a population of 248 people.

== Education ==
Pentland State School is a government primary (Early Childhood to Year 6) school for boys and girls at 18 Mill Street (conner of Gilmore Street, 20.5231°S 145.3982°E). In 2018, the school had an enrolment of 23 students with 3 teachers (2 full-time equivalent) and 5 non-teaching staff (3 full-time equivalent).

There are no secondary schools in Pentland or nearby. Distance education and boarding schools are the alternatives.

== Amenities ==
Pentland Soldiers Memorial Hall is at 2 Gilmore Street (20.5234°S 145.3987°E). There is a small war memorial at the front of the building where the annual Anzac Day ceremony is held.

There are two churches in Pentland:

- St Aidan's Anglican Church, 21 Mill Street (20.5227°S 145.39945°E)
- St Mary's Catholic Church, 64 Main Street (corner of Hunt Street, 20.5272°S 145.3956°E)

== Attractions ==
Pentland's history is presented at Pentland Hotel at 32 Main Street (20.5242°S 145.3987°E). It also provides meals and accommodation.

In the west of the locality where the highway passes over the Great Dividing Range (20.7146°S 145.2247°E) is the Burra Range Lookout, on the Flinders Highway at the Burra Range Rest Area in the White Mountains National Park.

== Events ==
Pentland Racecourse is at 5 Mackay Street (20.5258°S 145.4058°E). In 2025 they race in November with the feature race being the Pentland Cup (Class 4 Handicap).

== Transport ==
Queensland Rail's Inlander service between Townsville and Mount Isa provides a twice-weekly service which can be booked to stop at Pentland and Torrens Creek.

Preceding station	Queensland Rail	Following station
Long distance rail services
Charters Towers towards Townsville	The Inlander	Torrens Creek towards Mount Isa
