= Torrens Creek =

- Town
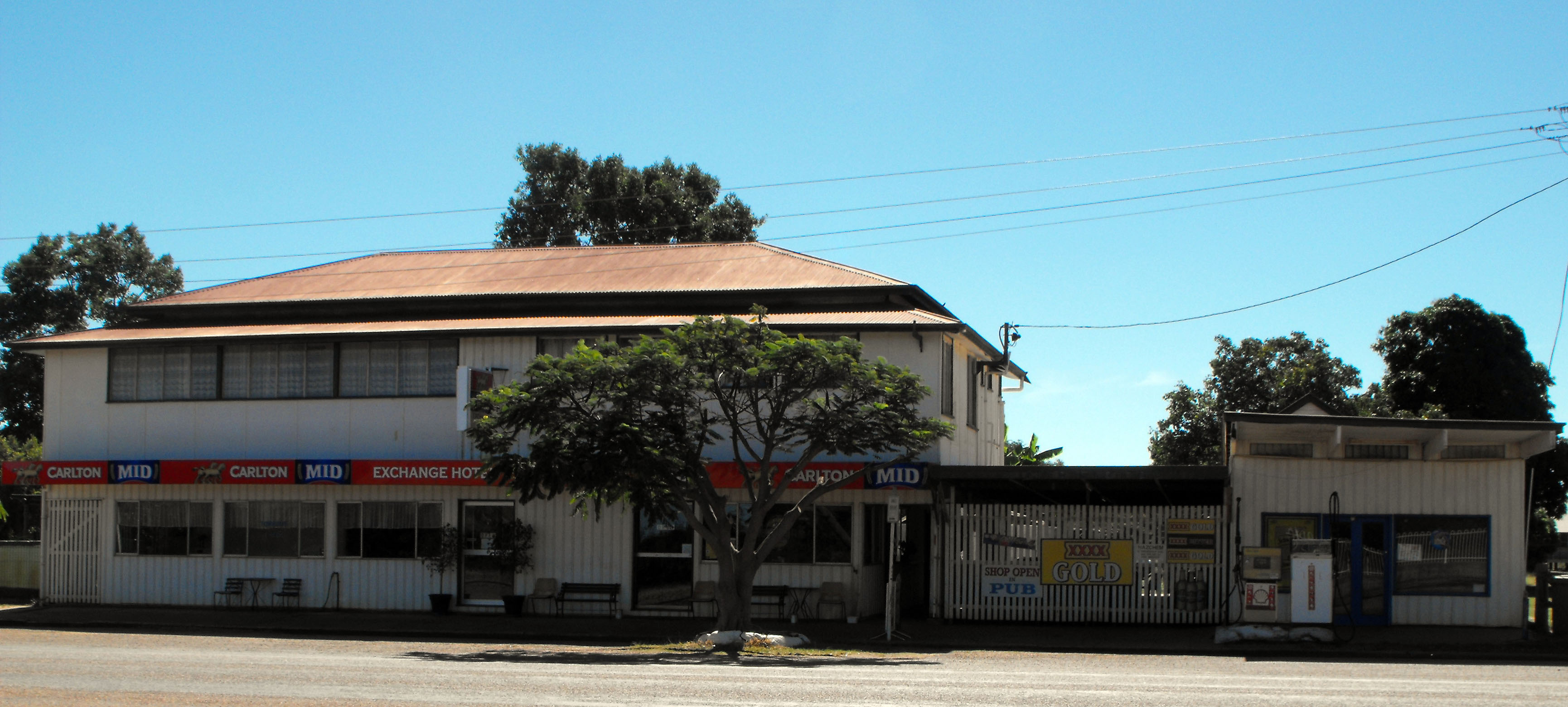
- The Exchange Hotel at Torrens Creek

- Interactive map of Torrens Creek
- Coordinates: 20.7688°S 145.0191°E
- Country: Australia
- State: Queensland
- LGA: Shire of Flinders
- Location: 89.3 km (55.5 mi) E of Hughenden; 159 km (99 mi) SW of Charters Towers; 294 km (183 mi) SW of Townsville; 1,408 km (875 mi) NW of Brisbane

Government
  - State electorate: Traeger
  - Federal division: Kennedy

Area
  - Total: 6,079.9 km^{2} (2,347.5 sq mi)

Population
  - Total: 46 (2021 census)
  - Density: 0.00757/km^{2} (0.01960/sq mi)
- Time zone: UTC+10:00 (AEST)
- Postcode: 4816
Localities around Torrens Creek
Porcupine	Pentland	Pentland
Prairie	Torrens Creek	Pentland
Prairie	Aramac	Aramac

Torrens Creek is a rural town and locality in the Shire of Flinders, Queensland, Australia. In the 2021 census, the locality of Torrens Creek had a population of 46 people.

== Geography ==
The town is on the Flinders Highway, 1,503 kilometres (934 mi) north-west of the state capital, Brisbane and 293 kilometres (182 mi) west of the city of Townsville.

The Great Northern Railway enters the locality from the east (Pentland), passes through the town which is served by Torrens Creek railway station (20.7705°S 145.0195°E), and exits to the west (Prairie).

The creek of the same name arises in the Great Dividing Range, flowing southward to the Thomson River system to eventually run into Lake Eyre.

White Mountains National Park is in the far north and north-east of the locality (20.5431°S 145.0511°E). Moorrinya National Park is on the western boundary of the locality (21.4203°S 144.9603°E).

Apart from the protected areas, the predominant land use is grazing on native vegetation.

== History ==
The creek after which the town is named was named after Sir Robert Richard Torrens by the explorer William Landsborough, who discovered it in 1862 while searching for Burke and Wills. Torrens introduced Torrens title to the then colony of South Australia by means of the Real Property Act 1858; it soon spread to the other colonies and to other countries and is still in use today. Circa 1885 it was known as Boorooman.

Waterholes along and around Torrens Creek are important places for the Indigenous people living in the area. In particular to the south of Torrens Creek, the Fisheries waterhole (Aberfoyle waterhole) was so named because Aboriginal people throughout the area went there to fish for golden perch using wicker-nets and fish traps made of hedges. During the early years of colonisation, competition for ownership and access to this waterhole was fierce. In 1865, the managers of Tower Hill cattle station, Llewellyn Meredith and Robert McNeely were killed by Aboriginal people at the Fisheries. Retribution soon followed and "the blacks in their turn had their graves by the score". With the destruction of Aboriginal society, the Fisheries became overstocked with fish. In 1890, the manager of Aberfoyle station removed tonnes of giant golden perch and burnt them to keep the waterhole clear.

The Great Northern Railway reached Torrens Creek in 1885, at which time it became the supply centre for a large district. Mailmen rode out far and wide to various stations, delivering mail along routes which are still used today. There is a cairn and plaque erected by Torrens Creek residents to honour the district's most famous mailman, Jack Blunt, who served from 1931 to 1954.

Torrens Creek Provisional School opened on 19 February 1891 On 1 January 1909 it became Torrens Creek State School. It closed on 6 December 1991. The school was 2 Bedford Street (20.7673°S 145.0198°E).

In 1942 a large World War II ammunition dump, associated with the Battle of the Coral Sea, exploded when a fire lit by American and Australian soldiers to create a firebreak got out of control. A series of 12 explosions resulted leaving craters 20 feet (6.1 m) deep, nearly destroying the town.

== Demographics ==
In the 2006 census, the locality of Torrens Creek and the surrounding area had a population of 64 people.

In the 2016 census, the locality of Torrens Creek had a population of 70 people.

In the 2021 census, the locality of Torrens Creek had a population of 46 people.

== Economy ==
There are a number of homesteads in the locality, including:

- Aberfoyle (21.6677°S 145.2687°E)
- Bannockburn (21.7775°S 145.0881°E)
- Bells Outstation (21.3630°S 144.9479°E)
- Cheltenham (21.0580°S 144.9459°E)
- Cranford (21.3519°S 145.0752°E)
- Elba (21.1380°S 145.0759°E)
- Keen Gea (21.4716°S 145.0913°E)
- Melinga (21.2516°S 145.1949°E)
- Mundoo Bluff (21.5099°S 145.3776°E)
- Oakley (21.0089°S 145.0594°E)
- Prairie Vale (21.6996°S 145.2163°E)
- Shirley (21.5033°S 144.9896°E)
- Tarella (21.3232°S 145.1836°E)
- Timaru (21.1688°S 145.1740°E)
- Tiree (21.6286°S 145.1169°E)
- Tumutvale (21.3603°S 145.1720°E)
- Wattlevale (20.7970°S 144.8596°E)
- Wogadoona (21.1116°S 144.9306°E)
- Woura Park (21.1917°S 144.9544°E)

== Education ==
There are no schools in Torrens Creek. The nearest government primary schools are Prairie State School in neighbouring Prairie to the west and Pentland State School in neighbouring Pentland to the east. The nearest government secondary school is Hughenden State School (to Year 12) in Hughenden to the west. However, due to the large size of the locality, the distances to these schools may be too large for daily school attendance. Distance education and boarding school are the alternatives.

== Amentities ==
The town has a hotel (pub) and a garage.

Torrens Creek Golf Club has an 18-hole golf course at the northern end of Hill Street (20.7659°S 145.0198°E). It is open to members and visitors.

== Attractions ==
Sawpit Gorge Lookout is within White Mountains National Park (20.6775°S 145.1837°E).

== Transport ==
Preceding station	Queensland Rail	Following station
Long distance rail services
Pentland towards Townsville	The Inlander	Hughenden towards Mount Isa
