= Sedgeford, Queensland =

Sedgeford Queensland
- Coordinates: 23.9822°S 146.8205°E
- Population: 0 (2016 census)
  - Density: 0.00000/km^{2} (0.0000/sq mi)
- Postcode(s): 4724
- Area: 1,877.2 km^{2} (724.8 sq mi)
- Time zone: AEST (UTC+10:00)
- Location: 50.4 km (31 mi) S of Alpha; 191 km (119 mi) ESE of Barcaldine; 217 km (135 mi) WSW of Emerald; 476 km (296 mi) W of Rockhampton; 1,049 km (652 mi) NW of Brisbane
- LGA(s): Barcaldine Region
- State electorate(s): Gregory
- Federal division(s): Maranoa
Suburbs around Sedgeford:
| Alpha | Beaufort | Beaufort |
| Drummondslope | Sedgeford | Port Wine |
| Drummondslope | Mantuan Downs | Lochington |

Sedgeford is a former rural locality in the Barcaldine Region, Queensland, Australia. In the 2016 census, Sedgeford had a population of 0 people.

On 22 November 2019, the Queensland Government decided to amalgamate the localities in the Barcaldine Region, resulting in five expanded localities based on the larger towns: Alpha, Aramac, Barcaldine, Jericho and Muttaburra. Sedgeford was incorporated into Alpha.

== Geography ==
The Central Western railway line and, to its immediate south, the Capricorn Highway form the northern boundary of the locality. The Mamboo railway station (23.6486°S 146.8147°E) services the locality and Beaufort to the north.

Native Companion Creek rises in the south of the locality near Troopers Bluff (elevation 570 metres (1,870 ft)) and flows north exiting the locality to the north-west (Alpha). The creek eventually becomes a tributary of the Belyando River.

The predominant land use is grazing on native vegetation.

== History ==
The origin of the name is unclear but it appears to have been a pastoral run name since 1884.

Mamboo railway station was established in 1954. Queensland Railways Department assigned the name Mamboo on 5 July 1954. It is an Aboriginal word in the Kabi language, meaning dogwood tree. However this is not an Indigenous language used in the area.

In 1912 Sedgeford pastoral station was sold by Mr Donaldson to Messrs Clark & Whiting.

== Education ==
There are no schools in Sedgeford. Neighbouring Alpha has a primary and secondary school (to Year 10). The nearest secondary schools including Years 11 and 12 are in Barcaldine and Emerald. Boarding schools and distance education are other options.
