= Cairns War Memorial =

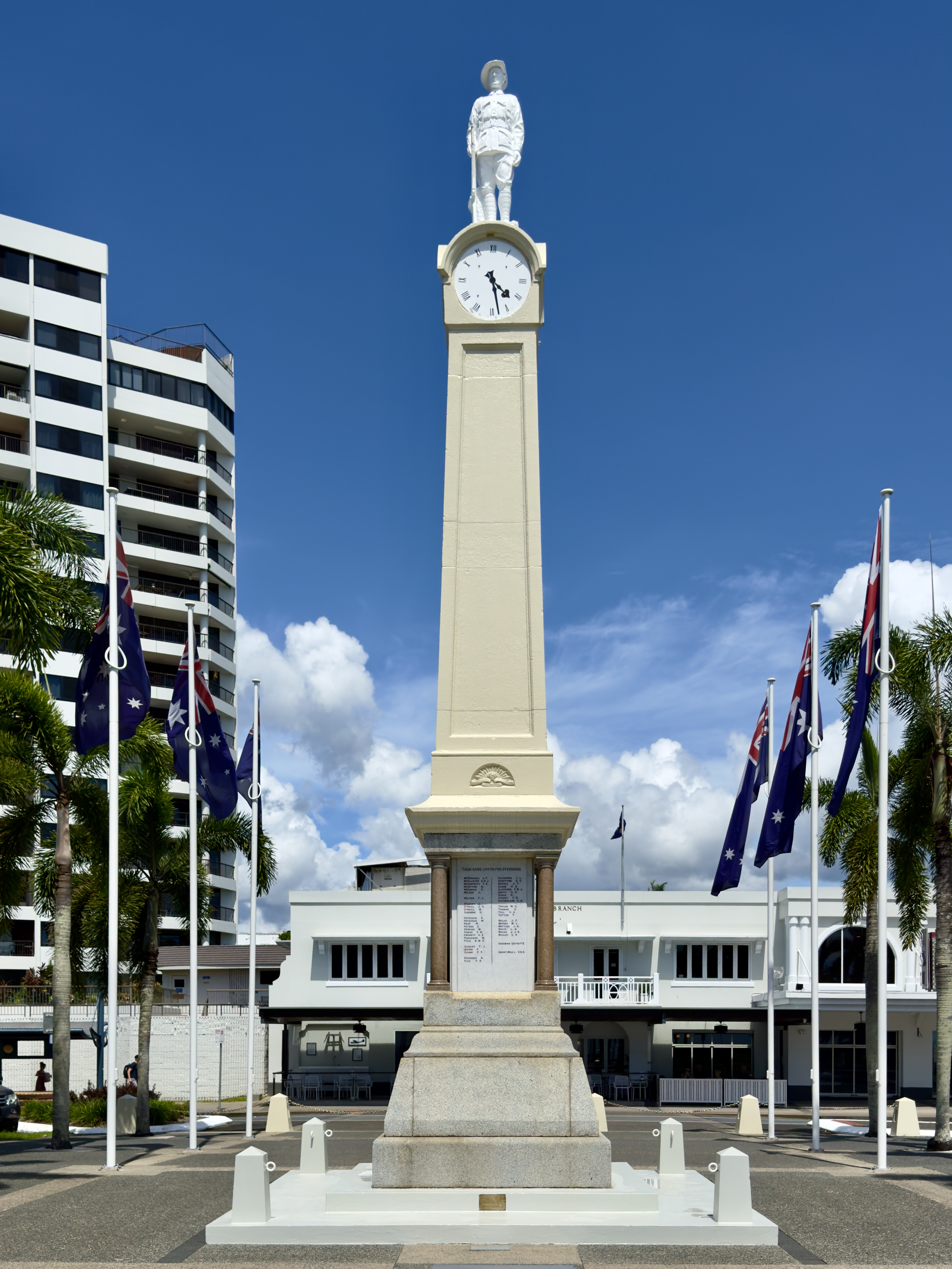
- Cairns War Memorial, 2025

- Location within Queensland
- 16.9172°S 145.7752°E
- Location: The Esplanade, Cairns City, Cairns, Cairns Region, Queensland, Australia

History
- Design period: 1919–1930s (interwar period)
- Built: 1925

Queensland Heritage Register
- Official name: Cairns War Memorial
- Type: state heritage (landscape, built)
- Designated: 21 October 1992
- Reference no.: 600378
- Significant period: 1925– (social); 1925–1972 (historical, fabric); 1925– (social)
- Significant components: time capsule, memorial surrounds/railings, memorial – clock tower, memorial – obelisk, memorial - soldier statue, guns/weaponry/armament

Cairns War Memorial is a heritage-listed memorial at The Esplanade, Cairns City, Cairns, Cairns Region, Queensland, Australia. It was built in 1925. It was added to the Queensland Heritage Register on 21 October 1992.

== History ==
The Cairns War Memorial is located between the Esplanade and Trinity Bay near Florence Street. It includes a granite, sandstone and marble World War I (WWI) monument with a digger (soldier) statue; an 1887 naval gun and a 1940 field gun; and a memorial garden walkway with plaques commemorating four post-WWI conflicts, the military services, and emergency service organisations. Initially unveiled in 1926 at the intersection of Abbott Street and Shields Street, the WWI monument was relocated to its current site in 1972. The monument has strong aesthetic and social significance and is part of a pattern of commemoration prevalent across Queensland and Australia after WWI. The later memorials added near the monument represent the common Australian practice of adding post-WWI conflict memorials and plaques to WWI memorial sites, and are also of social significance.

Trinity Bay was chosen as the port for the Hodgkinson goldfield in 1876. The first settlers arrived in October that year and Cairns became a port of entry on 1 November 1876. The founding of Port Douglas in 1877 almost stifled Cairns, as it provided an easier access route to the Hodgkinson. When tin was discovered on the Wild River in 1880, the road from Port Douglas to Herberton was also preferred to the pack tracks from Cairns. However, in September 1884 the government announced Cairns as the preferred terminus for a railway from Herberton to the coast and Cairns' future as the main settlement and port for Far North Queensland was assured. It was declared a municipality (Borough of Cairns) in 1885, and the municipal council became the Town of Cairns in 1903. Cairns was declared the City of Cairns in 1923 and the following year the North Coast railway from Brisbane to Cairns was completed. During the interwar period the economy of Far North Queensland boomed, thanks to an expanding and subsidised sugar industry, improved transport, and increased tourism. This prosperity was reflected in the city's built environment.

Like all Australian towns and cities, Cairns was affected by the impact of WWI. Of the 330,770 Australians who embarked for overseas service in WWI, 58,961 died and 170,909 were wounded, went missing or became prisoners of war. This meant that around 69% of embarked personnel became casualties, or 21% of eligible Australian males. No previous or subsequent war has had such an impact on Australia in terms of loss of life; almost every community in every Australian state lost young people. Even before the end of hostilities, memorials were being erected by Australian communities to honour local people who had served and died. These memorials were a spontaneous and highly visible expression of national grief; substitute graves for the Australians whose bodies lay in battlefield cemeteries in Europe and the Middle East. The word "cenotaph" literally means "empty tomb" and was commonly applied to war memorials following its use for the famous Cenotaph at Whitehall, London. Cenotaphs were tapering structures like the London precedent but the term applied generally to war monuments.

WWI memorials took a variety of forms in Australia, including honour boards, stone monuments (including obelisks, soldier statues, arches, crosses, columns or urns), tree-lined memorial avenues, memorial parks, and utilitarian structures such as gates, halls and clocks. In Queensland the digger (soldier) statue was the most popular choice of monument, while the obelisk predominated in southern states. The first permanent WWI memorial was unveiled at Balmain, New South Wales, 23 April 1916, while the first soldier statue's foundation stone was laid at Newcastle, New South Wales, three weeks before ANZAC Day (25 April) 1916.

In Queensland, 61 "digger" statutes were erected to commemorate WWI, and 59 survive today. The majority of these were carved from sandstone; with other materials being marble or bronze. Monumental masons Andrew Lang Petrie & Son, of Toowong, supplied more Queensland "digger" statues than any other firm, while Melrose & Fenwick, of Townsville, with branches in Charters Towers, Mackay and Cairns, held a virtual monopoly over the north. The firm supplied the diggers at Cairns (1926), Finch Hatton (1921), Gordonvale (1926), Mareeba (1923), Port Douglas (1923) and Sarina (1919). Other monuments by Melrose & Fenwick include an arch and obelisk at Ayr (1925), an obelisk at Babinda, a column and an honour board at Cardwell (separate locations, both in 1922), a cross at Eton, a column at Mackay (1929), and a clock tower at Townsville (1924).

The Cairns soldier statue stands "at ease", as do about half of Queensland's statues. The remainder stand in an attitude of mourning – "Rest on arms reverse" – while only one, the Atherton War Memorial, adopts an aggressive stance. All the statues supplied by Melrose & Fenwick stand "reverse arms" except for the Cairns statue.

The movement to build a war memorial in Cairns started as early as October 1916, when a collection was taken to form a fund for a permanent memorial, but no further action took place for some years. In early 1919 fundraising began for rest homes for returned men across Queensland, with the proceeds to be divided amongst eight districts, including Cairns. Later that year the Mayor of Cairns, RCF Gelling, discussed possible memorial forms (soldier statue, trees, pavilion or kiosk, honour boards, or a hospital ward) and locations (an intersection, Norman Park, the Esplanade, or ANZAC Park) with the Cairns sub-branch of the Returned Sailors and Soldiers' Imperial League of Australia (RSSILA). ANZAC Park, at the corner of Abbott Street and Spence Street, was gazetted in December 1920, but it wasn't until May 1922 a Cairns Soldiers' War Memorial Committee was formed to raise funds for a memorial to those soldiers of the district who had died. Subscription lists were issued and collectors were appointed for different areas of Cairns.

The Cairns Post regularly publicised a running total of donations from June 1922, but progress was slow. Only £165/5/9 was raised by 7 August 1922, and in September of that year a citizen complained in the Cairns Post that members of the Memorial Committee were "waiting for another war, so that the one memorial will do for the fallen in both wars". On ANZAC Day 1923 a procession took place from the military drill hall on Lake Street to ANZAC Park, where wreaths were laid on a temporary platform, and Digger Brown, the veteran presiding at the platform, stated it was a disgrace that a town of 8000 people could not raise money for a memorial.

Part of the reason for a delay in erecting a Cairns war memorial was disagreement over its form. A marble arch and a wrought iron gate in front of the courthouse were suggested in August 1922, while a kiosk in ANZAC Park was suggested in November 1923. The option of a tea room kiosk, including stone panels with names of the dead and a "digger" statue on the roof, was suggested by the Cairns Fathers' Association with the approval of the RSL. The cost was estimated to be £3000-£4000, and the kiosk was the favoured option from December 1923 until mid-1924. However, the scheme was opposed by some, and the Mayor, JG Hoare, had concerns about the cost of a kiosk even though he supported a useful memorial. Only £497 had been raised by 29 November 1923.

The argument over whether a war memorial should simply be a monument, or have a utilitarian function (the sacred versus the useful), was repeated all over Australia. The utilitarians believed that their approach was more enlightened and humane, and utility also appealed to local governments, as donations could offset the cost of needed infrastructure. However, monumentalists argued that utilitarian solutions were at the mercy of progress and would become outmoded over time. Monumentalists also believed that it was not really "commemoration", if a public resource that should have been built anyway was named a memorial. Post-WWI, most Australian localities decided on a monumental approach (60%), with only 22% choosing utilitarian buildings (mostly halls) and 18% choosing the compromise position of utilitarian monuments.

In November 1923 the Cairns Post reported "certain sections have advocated something of a purely monumental nature, others have been equally keen in urging the erection of something which will be of public service, such as a hall or similar building, suitably ornamented with the names of the fallen". The newspaper pointed out if the aim was to build something of benefit to a larger, future Cairns, then it had to be kept in mind later generations might add new memorials; and the city could only erect a memorial which it could afford. The money available would help determine the form of the memorial. The Cairns Post article added the project was more likely to get local government subsidies, and public support, if the memorial had public utility- such as a city clock.

However, the opinion of monumentalists was expressed by WM Carleton Brush, who stated that "to collect money for a memorial for our fallen, and spend it for the benefit of the living, is shameful". Instead of a kiosk, there should be a cenotaph on the Esplanade. "An ice cream shop or a dancing hall are not monuments to those who are buried elsewhere, but are monuments to the selfishness of the living".

After wrangling within the War Memorial Committee in early 1924, when Mayor Hoare and the women subscribers squared off against those men in favour of the kiosk, a more modest form of utilitarian monument was decided on at a public meeting of subscribers in July 1924: a public clock, with striker, on a column (the final form was an obelisk rather than a column). Cairns did not have a town clock, and it was recognised that the city could not afford a kiosk; opinion now favoured "some object combining beauty and utility with convenient and suitable form". It was stated that "every hour that it strikes the people will then realise that the clock is in memory of the men who left the district.". The idea of a clock may have been given a boost by the unveiling of a granite memorial column with four clock faces (built by Melrose & Fenwick) at Anzac Memorial Park in Townsville in April 1924.

At this stage the plan was for three marble plates to list those who had enlisted, with a fourth plate for those who had failed to return, but the memorial eventually only included those who died, arranged alphabetically (apart from two nurses) over three slabs. Many other Australian war memorials also listed those who served and survived. This was either by deliberate choice, or because smaller localities had the room on the memorial to list everyone. How to list the names – alphabetically or chronologically – was also a local decision. Just over half of Australia's WWI memorials list survivors (the majority on separate panels). This was far more common in Australia than in the other Allied countries, because Australia was the only combatant country without conscription, and people felt it was appropriate to acknowledge the volunteers. Some communities went so far as to list those who had volunteered but had been rejected as medically unfit – such as at Montville in Queensland. About one in 10 local memorials record nurses' names.

In October 1924 a design competition for the memorial was won by Melrose & Fenwick, although the height of their design was later increased. By this time £936/8/6 had been raised. A prominent position on the corner of Abbott and Shields Streets was selected as the site for the memorial in December 1924.

The foundation stone was laid by Mayor AJ Draper on 4 January 1925, and sales of cards to be placed in a time capsule in the stone, with the names of citizens who had purchased them, raised £6/4/-, boosting funds to £1113. Two local newspapers and an official message were also put into the capsule. It was anticipated that the memorial, of blue granite and freestone, would be unveiled on ANZAC Day 1925, but delays occurred over the design of the clock to surmount the obelisk, and no tenders were received until mid-1925. Eventually it was realised that a striking clock would be too heavy for the memorial, and when the memorial was finally unveiled on ANZAC Day 1926, it included a non-striking clock (actually four impulse, or "slave" clocks, operated by a master clock). The concrete foundation stone was prepared by TB O'Meara & Sons of Cairns; the base was constructed by contractor M Garvey of Cairns; and Harry Orton of Melrose & Fenwick carried out the work on the memorial itself.

Unveiled by Mayor Draper (who preferred a clock to a non-practical memorial) in front of a crowd of 3000 citizens, the monument was reported as being 41 feet (12 m) high and composed of granite, freestone and marble. The final cost of the monument and clock, £2074, was met by last minute fundraising by Scouts and Girl Guides, plus an anonymous donation of £66, allowing it to be unveiled debt-free. The Reverend CW Morsley spoke at the ceremony, claiming that the clock would remind people of the time of day, but it would also remind them that this was the time when they commemorated the courage of the men who helped Australia step into its nationhood; a time when they condemned war; and a time to work for peace.

The Cairns monument is the most expensive soldier statue memorial in Queensland, probably due to the extra cost of the clock function; the next most expensive is Goondiwindi's at £1800. The only other memorial to combine clocks and a statue in Queensland is the Bowen War Memorial (unveiled 1926), built by Andrew Lang Petrie & Son. Other forms of Queensland WWI memorial that incorporate, or once incorporated, clocks are located in Barcaldine (1924, Barcaldine War Memorial Clock), Goomeri (1940, Goomeri War Memorial Clock), Ithaca (1922, Ithaca War Memorial), and Townsville (1924, Anzac Memorial Park).

WWI monument sites were usually chosen to be prominent and accessible, such as parks or major intersections, or were outside schools, town halls, and post offices. However, as towns grew and motor traffic volumes increased over time, monuments at intersections could become traffic hazards and a number were relocated, as was the case in Cairns. The Cairns monument stood at the intersection of Shields and Abbott Street until it was moved in 1972 to its current location between the Esplanade and the ocean, opposite the RSL, which has occupied its site (initially as a rest home) since c.1919.

By 1972 the clocks had been removed. The four impulse clocks, advanced every 30 seconds by a battery-powered master clock (initially sited at Mackay's jewellers on Shields Street, and later the Council Chambers on Abbott Street) had not worked accurately since mains power was installed. They have now been replaced with painted replicas, set to the time of the ANZAC landing at Gallipoli: 4:28 am on the morning of 25 April 1915.

During the move the soldier statue was dropped. Both arms broke off, the head fell off, and the rifle broke into three pieces, requiring repairs to be made. The name cards and newspapers inserted in the foundation time capsule in 1925 were retrieved at the time of the move (their current location is unknown) and a new capsule containing Cairns City Council and RSL records was placed beneath the paving in front of the memorial's new location.

At the new site a 1940 field gun (Quick Firing 25 pounder, MKII, Vickers Armstrong), and an 1887 naval gun (Vavasseur 5-inch (130 mm) breech-loading gun, Royal Carriage Department, Woolwich) were placed on either side of the WWI monument. The naval gun was sent to Cairns in 1889 for use by the Cairns Naval Brigade, formed in 1888, and it was initially positioned at the Cairns Courthouse. Guns of the same make and manufacture date are currently located at Maryborough and Townsville.

The Cairns War Memorial's statue had been painted by 1985. The WWI monument and the two guns underwent repair work in 2001. Landscaping work around the monument circa 2003 included new concrete platforms for the guns, paving, extra concrete bollards, flagstaffs, palm trees, and lighting. A memorial garden walkway and a memorial flame sculpture were added north-west of the monument during the Esplanade's redevelopment in 2003. The walkway includes memorial plaques dedicated to post-WWI conflicts, in accordance with the RSL's desire to have a more inclusive war memorial. The addition of memorials to later conflicts on or near WWI memorials is a common practice in Queensland and Australia, and creates a chronological record of the military service and sacrifice of a particular town or region over time. A World War II (WWII) monument to M and Z Special Units, which was previously located at the site of the Z Experimental Station "House on the Hill" at Earlville, and then at the HMAS Cairns naval base from 1994, was moved to near the WWI monument in 2006; and a memorial to 31/51 Australian Infantry Battalion (2 AIF) has also been erected.

== Description ==
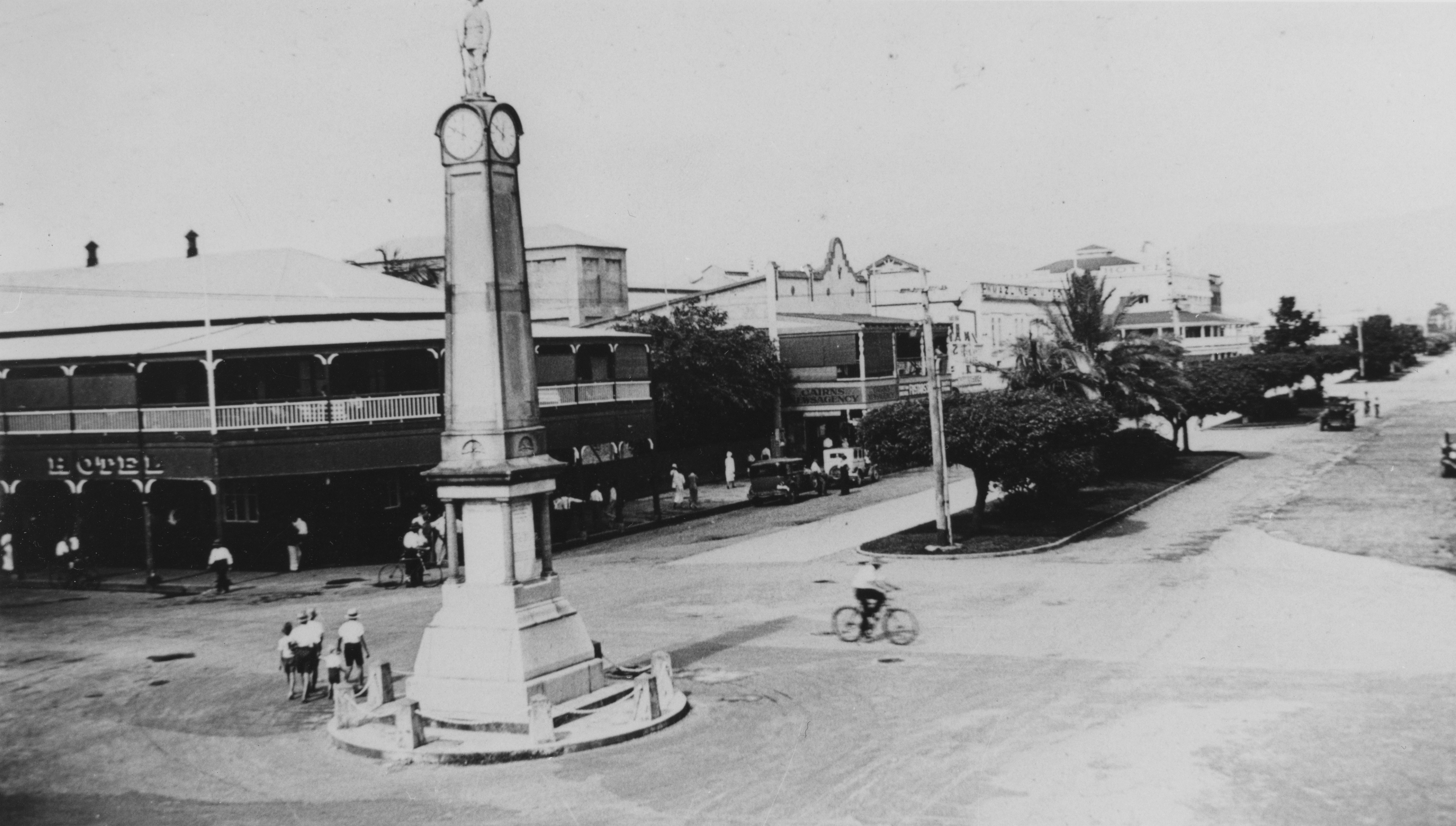
Cairns War Memorial, at the intersection of Abbott Street and Shields Street, circa 1934

The Cairns War Memorial, facing Trinity Bay to the north-east, is located in a park reserve on the Esplanade near the junction with Florence Street. The WWI monument is located opposite the Cairns RSL at the corner of Florence Street, and is clearly visible from both the road and a walkway along the foreshore. The view from the road, with the WWI monument, a symbol of great sacrifice, juxtaposed against a tranquil, palm-lined setting overlooking the ocean, is particularly evocative. A memorial garden walkway, surrounded by trees and shrubs, is located north-west of the WWI monument.

The WWI monument is square in plan and sits on a stepped concrete platform surrounded by eight concrete bollards and a tapered unpolished granite base. The sandstone pedestal has a recessed block, with leaded marble plates mounted on each face, flanked by red polished granite corner columns. One marble plate contains dedicatory inscriptions only, while the other three include inscriptions and an honour roll of 140 alphabetically arranged men's names, followed by two female nurses' names. Above this is a tapering painted sandstone obelisk with four clock faces, set at 4.28, each side of the rounded apex. The obelisk rests on a deep cornice, above which is the AIF symbol. Surmounting the apex is a sandstone statue of a soldier facing out to sea with head erect, rifle "at ease" and a tree stump support; the statue is now painted.

The monument is flanked by a 1940 field gun set on a raised concrete slab to the north and an 1887 naval gun with gun shield, also on a raised concrete slab, to the south-east. The area between the monument and the guns is paved, with lines of bollards, flags and foxtail palms within the paved area. Additional palms, plus lighting, are located outside the paved area.

To the north-west of the 1940 field gun is a small concrete cairn with metal plaques honouring M and Z Special Units of WWII. There is also a metal plaque, set onto a concrete block, dedicated to the 31/51 Australian Infantry battalion (2 AIF), between the WWI monument and the ocean.

North-west of the monument is a memorial garden walkway, aligned south-east to north-west. It includes ten recessed curved bays of rendered concrete blockwork with sandstone capping, each bay including a bronze memorial plaque mounted on a sandstone plinth. The plaques are dedicated to WWII (1939–1945); the Korean War (1950–1953); Malaya and Borneo (1948–1960, 1965–1966); South Vietnam (1962–1973); each of the three armed services; and the Queensland Police, Ambulance, and Fire and Rescue services.

North-west of the memorial garden walkway is a memorial flame artwork, consisting of a stylised metal flame on a circular painted concrete base.

== Heritage listing ==
Cairns War Memorial was listed on the Queensland Heritage Register on 21 October 1992 having satisfied the following criteria.

The place is important in demonstrating the evolution or pattern of Queensland's history.

The Cairns War Memorial is important in demonstrating Queensland's involvement in major world events.

The World War I (WWI) monument, first unveiled at a different site in 1926, is a tribute to those from the district who died during WWI (1914–1918). WWI memorials, as the focus of ANZAC Day ceremonies, are an important element of Queensland's towns and cities and are also important in demonstrating a common pattern of commemoration across Queensland and Australia.

The later memorials added near the WWI monument represent the common Australian practice of adding post-WWI conflict memorials and plaques to WWI memorial sites. This facilitates remembrance of all those who have died in Australia's overseas conflicts.

The place is important in demonstrating the principal characteristics of a particular class of cultural places.

The WWI monument is an excellent example of its type. It is located in a prominent position and includes a list of those from the local community who died in the war. It uses high quality materials and design in a formal composition with strong symbolic meaning, and has had memorials to later conflicts added nearby.

The place is important because of its aesthetic significance.

The Cairns War Memorial, a place of strong symbolic meaning to the community of Cairns and its region, is important for its aesthetic significance. It is a place of sombre ceremonial purpose and reflection, heightened by its siting on the Esplanade overlooking the Coral Sea. The strong axiality of its paths and formal placement of memorials, plantings and flagpoles add to this aesthetic landscape.

The place has a strong or special association with a particular community or cultural group for social, cultural or spiritual reasons.

As a focal point for remembrance ceremonies, the Cairns War Memorial is highly valued by the community for its spiritual, symbolic, cultural and social associations. The WWI monument has a long, special and enduring connection with the people of Cairns and surrounding district, while more recently placed memorials have added new layers of meaning.
