= Beaufort, Queensland =

Beaufort Queensland
- Coordinates: 23.4566°S 146.8508°E
- Population: 46 (2016 census)
  - Density: 0.0384/km^{2} (0.0995/sq mi)
- Postcode(s): 4724
- Area: 1,197.9 km^{2} (462.5 sq mi)
- Time zone: AEST (UTC+10:00)
- Location: 38.4 km (24 mi) NW of Alpha; 140 km (87 mi) E of Barcaldine; 192 km (119 mi) W of Emerald; 461 km (286 mi) W of Rockhampton; 1,024 km (636 mi) NW of Brisbane
- LGA(s): Barcaldine Region
- State electorate(s): Gregory
- Federal division(s): Maranoa
Suburbs around Beaufort:
Surbiton	Quetta	Quetta
Surbiton	Beaufort	Pine Hill
Alpha	Sedgeford	Port Wine

Beaufort is a former rural locality in the Barcaldine Region, Queensland, Australia. In the 2016 census, Beaufort had a population of 46 people.

On 22 November 2019, the Queensland Government decided to amalgamate the localities in the Barcaldine Region, resulting in five expanded localities based on the larger towns: Alpha, Aramac, Barcaldine, Jericho and Muttaburra. Beaufort was incorporated into Alpha.

== Geography ==
The southern boundary of the locality is the Central Western railway line and, to its immediate south, the Capricorn Highway. The Mamboo railway station (23.6486°S 146.8147°E) services the locality and Sedgeford to the north.

The Belyando River flows through the locality from the south-east (Port Wine) to the north-west (Surbiton/Quetta). Being east of the Great Dividing Range, the river is part of the North East Coast drainage basin. It is a tributary of the Suttor River, which in turn is a tributary of the Burdekin River, which flows into the Coral Sea at Rita Island in the Shire of Burdekin.

The principal land use is grazing on native vegetation.

== History ==
The locality presumably takes its name from the county, which in turn is named after Mount Beaufort, which in turn is named 20 July 1846 by Sir Thomas Mitchell after Rear-Admiral Sir Frances Beaufort, creator of the Beaufort Scale for indicating wind force.

In 1863 Arthur Hunter Palmer (Premier of Queensland from 1870 to 1874) leased nine pastoral runs in the Belyando Valley which he collectively called Beaufort Station. Over the years, he expanded or reduced the size of station, selling it finally in 1897.

Mamboo railway station was established in 1954. Queensland Railways Department assigned the name Mamboo on 5 July 1954. It is an Aboriginal word in the Kabi language, meaning dogwood tree. However this is not an Indigenous language used in the area.

== Education ==
There are no schools in Beaufort. The nearest primary school is in Alpha which also has the nearest secondary school, but only to Year 10. The nearest secondary schools to Year 12 are in Barcaldine 140 kilometres (87 mi) to the west and Emerald 192 kilometres (119 mi) to the east. Other options are boarding schools and distance education.

== Notable residents ==
- Arthur Hunter Palmer, Premier of Queensland, owned Beaufort Station
