= Barcaldine Masonic Temple =

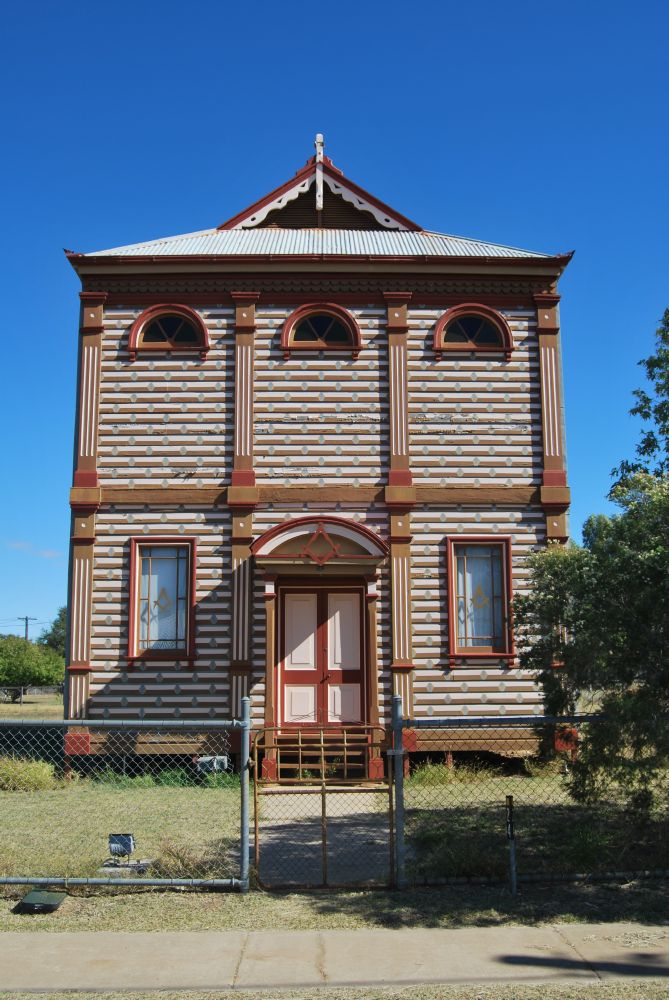
- Barcaldine Masonic Temple, 2010

- Location within Queensland Location within Australia
- 23°33′20″S 145°17′17″E
- Location: 39 Beech Street, Barcaldine, Barcaldine Region, Queensland, Australia

History
- Design period: 1900–1914 (early 20th century)
- Built: 1900

Queensland Heritage Register
- Official name: Barcaldine Masonic Temple, Comet Masonic Temple
- Type: state heritage (built)
- Designated: 21 October 1992
- Reference no.: 600020
- Significant period: 1900 (fabric)

Barcaldine Masonic Temple is a heritage-listed masonic temple at 39 Beech Street, Barcaldine, Barcaldine Region, Queensland, Australia. It was built in 1900. It is also known as Comet Masonic Temple. It was added to the Queensland Heritage Register on 21 October 1992.

== History ==
The Masonic temple at Barcaldine was constructed in 1901 as the second temple of the Comet Lodge, the first having been moved from Dingo Creek in stages following the growth of the railway line.

Freemasonry spread from New South Wales into Queensland in individual lodges. The first Freemason's lodge in Queensland was established in 1859, shortly before Separation from New South Wales. New lodges were formed as settlement spread and freemasonry was carried along newly built roads and railways by Masons who were working on them. In 1876 Robert Ballard, Chief Engineer with the Central Western Railway pushing westwards from Rockhampton and a handful of other Masons, established the Comet Lodge No 1680 at Dingo Creek. The lodge is possibly unique in that it holds its warrant almost 300 miles (480 km) away from the town for which it was granted. The railway workers who were members carried their building with them, dismantling it and moving it in railway trucks to be bolted together again in a new settlement as work progressed. In this manner it moved to the new railway camp at Cometville in 1878, Emerald in 1879, Bogantungan in 1881, Pine Hill in 1883, Jericho in 1885 and finally came to rest in Barcaldine in 1886. It was then refurbished.

A new and larger temple was constructed in 1900 for a cost of £720 and is said to have been based on the original. It was dedicated in 1901 and continued to make an important contribution to the life of the town as a venue for social interaction. Conservation work was undertaken on the building in the early 1980s, when the painted "masonry" effect on the facade was reinstated.

== Description ==
The masonic temple is located on the west side of Beech Street, Barcaldine. It is a two-storey, timber-framed building set on low stumps with a gambrel corrugated iron clad roof with triangular dormers on the north and south sides. The exterior is clad plainly in vertical corrugated iron on the back and sides.

The most striking feature of the building is the elaborate treatment of the front, which is clad with horizontal timber boards painted to mimic ashlar masonry. The gable facing the front has scalloped barge boards and finials. The facade is divided into three bays by fluted timber pilasters supporting a scalloped entablature below the eave. It has a central entrance sheltered by a pediment porch and flanked by sash windows. The upper storey has high round arched windows to each bay. The sides of the building have large windows on the ground floor and small high openings on the floor above.

The interior is clad with tongue and groove timber boards and is very intact, retaining the original colour schemes. The ground floor, which is used as a supper room, exhibits a brown dado with hand painted floral frieze. Above this are horizontal tongue and groove boards painted ochre yellow. The room has a series of shallow arched enclosed beams supporting the upper floor. At the rear of the ground floor there are ancillary rooms situated in either corner. Between them is a central entrance which has a section of hit and miss flooring, presumably for the clearing of mud from boots.

From here a timber stair with a simple slatted balustrade rises in an L form to the upper floor landing off which a dressing room opens directly into the lodge room. This has partially curved ceilings that rise to a boarded ceiling set between moulded ribs which spring from mock pilasters at the side walls. The ceiling between has been lined with what appears to be "caneite" sheet. The wall panels are a mix of horizontal and diagonal boards set above a simple dado. It is lit only by small high windows down the sides and by the three semicircular windows at the front.

== Heritage listing ==
Barcaldine Masonic Temple was listed on the Queensland Heritage Register on 21 October 1992 having satisfied the following criteria.

The place is important in demonstrating the evolution or pattern of Queensland's history.

The Masonic Temple is important in demonstrating the rapid growth of towns along the path of the railway and a reminder of the way in which Freemasonry was established in many western towns by the workers constructing those lines.

The place demonstrates rare, uncommon or endangered aspects of Queensland's cultural heritage.

It is a remarkable demonstration of adapting a classical vocabulary to a vernacular style and available materials and the painted mock stonework on the front is a very rare technique in Queensland.

The place is important in demonstrating the principal characteristics of a particular class of cultural places.

The Barcaldine temple is important as a characteristic and intact example of a regional Masonic temple, a category of building often prominent in both the streetscape and social life of many country towns.

The place is important because of its aesthetic significance.

The Barcaldine temple is important as a characteristic and intact example of a regional Masonic temple, a category of building often prominent in both the streetscape and social life of many country towns.

The place has a strong or special association with a particular community or cultural group for social, cultural or spiritual reasons.

The Masonic Temple, Barcaldine, has a special association with both lodge members and with the Freemason's movement in Queensland.
