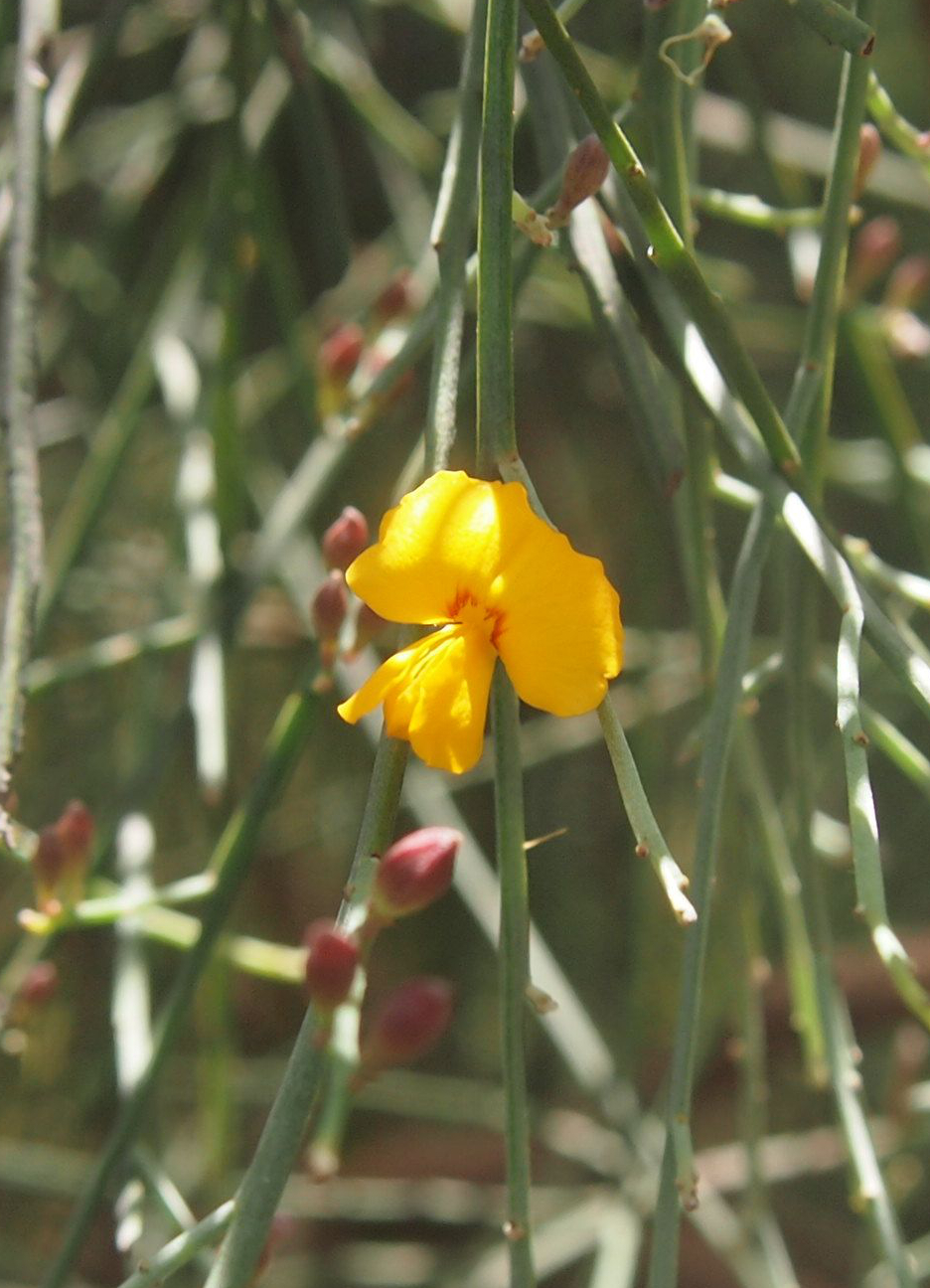

Scientific classification
- Kingdom: Plantae
- Clade: Tracheophytes
- Clade: Angiosperms
- Clade: Eudicots
- Clade: Rosids
- Order: Fabales
- Family: Fabaceae
- Subfamily: Faboideae
- Genus: Jacksonia
- Species: J. scoparia

Binomial name
- Jacksonia scoparia R.Br.

Synonyms
- ? Jacksonia lateriflora Steud. nom. inval., pro syn.; Jacksonia macrocarpa Benth.; Jacksonia scoparia R.Br. nom. illeg.; Jacksonia scoparia var. gonoclada Maiden & Betche; Jacksonia scoparia R.Br. var. scoparia; Piptomeris scoparia (R.Br. ex Sm.) Greene; Viminaria lateriflora Link

= Jacksonia scoparia =

Species of legume

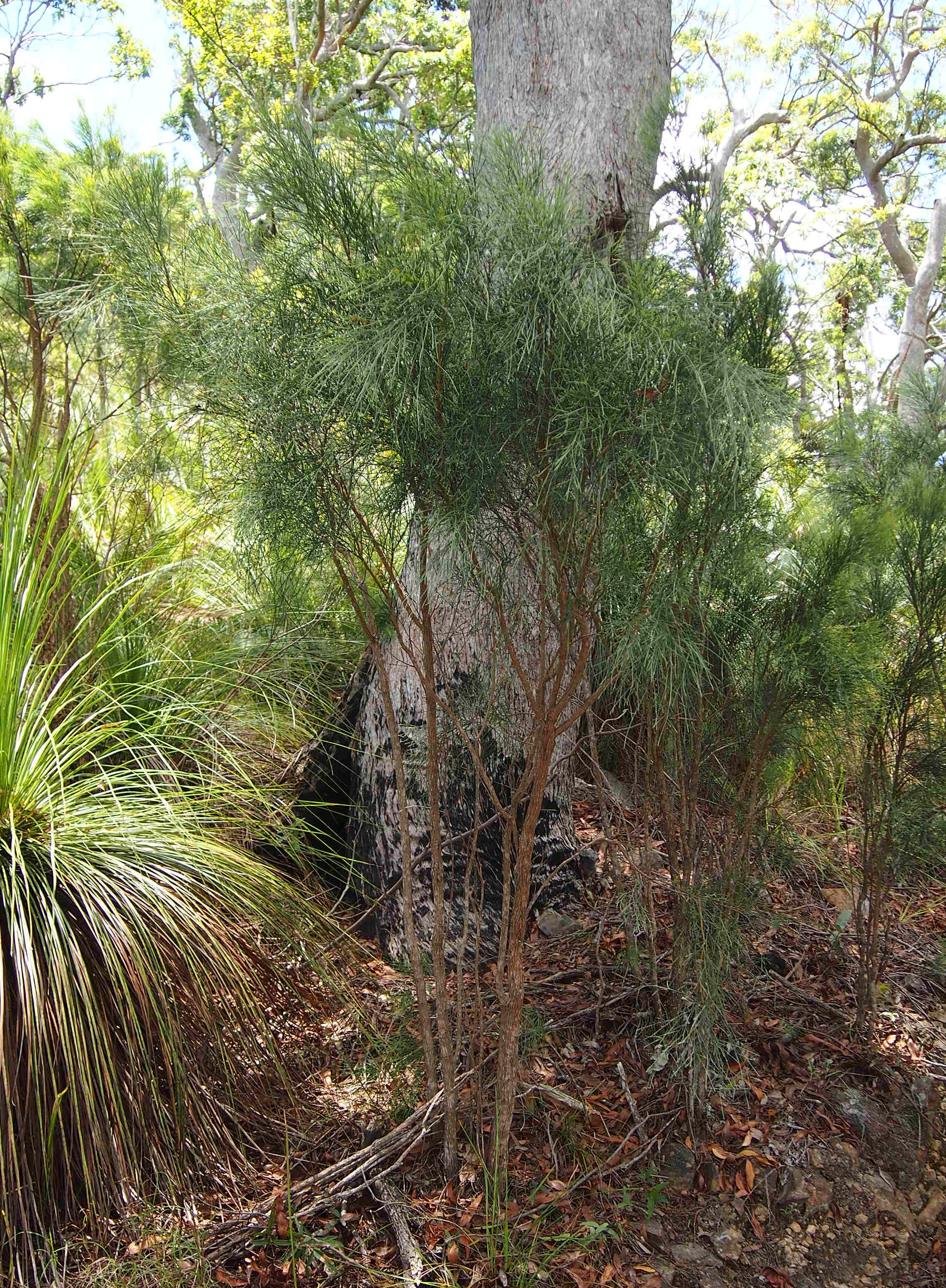
In Mount Archer National Park

Jacksonia scoparia, commonly known as dogwood or winged broom-pea, is a species of flowering plant in the family Fabaceae and is endemic to eastern Australia. It is a shrub or small tree with angled or winged branchlets, leaves usually reduced to scales, cream-coloured to orange-yellow flowers and oblong, hairy pods.

== Description ==
Jacksonia scoparia is a shrub or small tree that typically grows up to 3–5 m (9.8–16.4 ft) high, sometimes up to 12 m (39 ft) and has erect or pendulous, strongly angled or winged branches and branchlets. Its grey bark is rough with furrows. Its leaves are reduced to egg-shaped, dark brown scales. The flowers are scattered along the branches on a pedicel 2.3–3.9 mm (0.091–0.154 in) long. There are egg-shaped bracteoles 0.4–0.7 mm (0.016–0.028 in) long on the pedicels, but are sometimes lost. The floral tube is 0.7–0.9 mm (0.028–0.035 in) long and the sepals are membranous, 3.8–4.1 mm (0.15–0.16 in) long with lobes 3.0–4.1 mm (0.12–0.16 in) long. The petals are yellowish-orange with red markings, the standard petal 5.2–7.2 mm (0.20–0.28 in) long, the wings about 4.5–6.3 mm (0.18–0.25 in) long, and the keel is 4.1–5.7 mm (0.16–0.22 in) long. The stamens have yellowish-green filaments 3.7–6.3 mm (0.15–0.25 in) long. Flowering occurs throughout the year, with a peak in spring to early summer, and the fruit is a membranous, oval pod 3.2–8 mm (0.13–0.31 in) long.

== Taxonomy ==
Scottish botanist Robert Brown described dogwood in 1811 in Rees's Cyclopædia, from material sent by John White and George Caley to Kew Garden. The genus name honours George Jackson and the species name is derived from the foliage, which resembles Scotch broom (Cytisus scoparius). Jenny Chappill classified it in Group 4 within the genus, along with Jacksonia chappilliae, Jacksonia rhadinoclona and Jacksonia stackhousei —all from eastern Australia.

Dogwood Creek in Queensland was named after the profusion of the plant in the area by explorer Ludwig Leichhardt on 23 October 1844 during his expedition from Moreton Bay to Port Essington (now Darwin, Northern Territory).

== Distribution and habitat ==
Jacksonia scoparia is widespread in south-east Queensland and eastern New South Wales north from Bega where it grows in woodland on hillsides and ridges, usually on low nutrient soils.

== Uses and cultivation ==
Its tendency to flower profusely makes J. scoparia an attractive subject for the garden. It was introduced into cultivation in England in 1803. It can be grown in sun or part-shaded positions. During droughts, dogwood has provided a useful fodder that is relished by cattle. Propagation is relatively easy from seed following pre-treatment with boiling water (similar to other members of the pea family). Cuttings also strike reasonably readily.
