= Home Creek, Queensland =

Home Creek Queensland
- Coordinates: 23.9838°S 145.2372°E
- Population: 24 (2016 census)
  - Density: 0.0195/km^{2} (0.0505/sq mi)
- Area: 1,231.5 km^{2} (475.5 sq mi)
- Time zone: AEST (UTC+10:00)
- Location: 56.2 km (35 mi) S of Blackall; 80.2 km (50 mi) N of Blackall, Queensland; 635 km (395 mi) W of Rockhampton; 1,045 km (649 mi) NW of Brisbane
- LGA(s): Barcaldine Region
- State electorate(s): Gregory
- Federal division(s): Maranoa
Suburbs around Home Creek:
Barcaldine Downs	Patrick	Patrick
Barcaldine Downs	Home Creek	Narbethong
Moombria	Blackall	Evora

Home Creek is a former rural locality in the Barcaldine Region, Queensland, Australia. In the 2016 census, Home Creek had a population of 24 people.

On 22 November 2019, the Queensland Government decided to amalgamate the localities in the Barcaldine Region, resulting in five expanded localities based on the larger towns: Alpha, Aramac, Barcaldine, Jericho and Muttaburra. Home Creek was incorporated into Barcaldine.

== Geography ==
The Landsborough Highway passes through the locality from north (Patrick) to south (Blackall).

The watercourse Home Creek (from which the locality presumably takes its name) rises in Evora to the south-east and then flows through the locality of Home Creek from the south-east to the west (Barcaldine Downs) where it becomes a tributary to the Alice River.

The principal land use is grazing on native vegetation.

== Education ==
There are no schools in Home Creek. The nearest primary and secondary schools are in Barcaldine and Blackall.
