= Patrick, Queensland =

Patrick Queensland
- Coordinates: 23.7544°S 145.2463°E
- Population: 26 (2016 census)
  - Density: 0.0611/km^{2} (0.1583/sq mi)
- Postcode(s): 4725
- Area: 425.4 km^{2} (164.2 sq mi)
- Time zone: AEST (UTC+10:00)
- Location: 24.2 km (15 mi) S of Barcaldine; 130 km (81 mi) ESE of Longreach; 603 km (375 mi) W of Rockhampton; 1,051 km (653 mi) NW of Brisbane
- LGA(s): Barcaldine Region
- State electorate(s): Gregory
- Federal division(s): Maranoa
Suburbs around Patrick:
Barcaldine Downs	Barcaldine	Barcaldine
Barcaldine Downs	Patrick	Narbethong
Home Creek	Home Creek	Narbethong

Patrick is a former rural locality in the Barcaldine Region, Queensland, Australia. In the 2016 census, Patrick had a population of 26 people.

On 22 November 2019, the Queensland Government decided to amalgamate the localities in the Barcaldine Region, resulting in five expanded localities based on the larger towns: Alpha, Aramac, Barcaldine, Jericho and Muttaburra. Patrick was incorporated into Barcaldine.

== Geography ==
The Landsborough Highway passes through the location from the north (Barcaldine) to the south (Home Creek).

The Alice River forms the western boundary of the locality. Patrick Creek flows through the locality from east (Narbethong) to west, where it becomes a tributary of the Alice River.

The principal land use is grazing on native vegetation.

== History ==
The locality presumably takes its name from the creek, which in turn was named on 10 October 1861 by Frederick Walker during his expedition to rescue the Burke and Wills expedition. Patrick was Walker's Aboriginal assistant.

== Schools ==
There are no schools in Patrick. The nearest primary and secondary schools are in Barcaldine.
