= Barcaldine Downs =

- Suburb
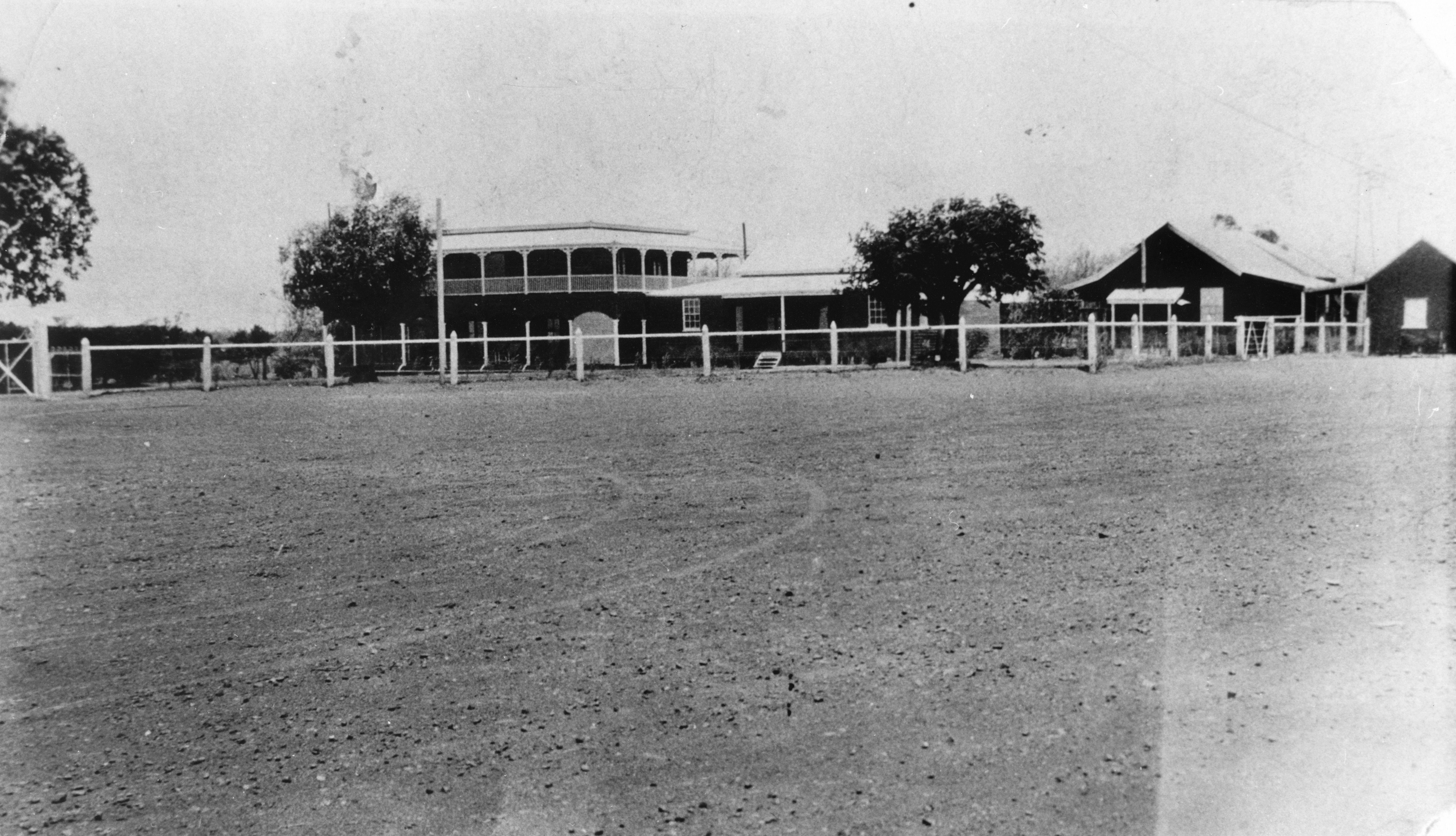
- Barcaldine Downs Station homestead

- Coordinates: 23.8019°S 144.9788°E
- Country: Australia
- State: Queensland
- LGA: Barcaldine Region
- Location: 47.6 km (29.6 mi) SW of Barcaldine; 133 km (83 mi) SE of Longreach; 627 km (390 mi) W of Rockhampton; 1,107 km (688 mi) NW of Brisbane

Government
  - State electorate: Gregory
  - Federal division: Maranoa

Area
  - Total: 1,239.7 km^{2} (478.7 sq mi)

Population
  - Total: 14 (2016 census)
  - Density: 0.0113/km^{2} (0.0292/sq mi)
- Time zone: UTC+10:00 (AEST)
- Postcode: 4725
Suburbs around Barcaldine Downs
Tara Station	Tara Station	Barcaldine
Ilfracombe	Barcaldine Downs	Patrick
Ilfracombe	Moombria	Home Creek

Barcaldine Downs is a former rural locality in the Barcaldine Region, Queensland, Australia. In the 2016 census, Barcaldine Downs had a population of 14 people.

On 22 November 2019, the Queensland Government decided to amalgamate the localities in the Barcaldine Region, resulting in five expanded localities based on the larger towns: Alpha, Aramac, Barcaldine, Jericho and Muttaburra. Barcaldine Downs was incorporated into Barcaldine.

== Geography ==
The Barcaldine Isisford Road passes through the locality, entering the locality from the north-east (Barcaldine) and exits to the south-west (Ilfracombe).

The Alice River flows through the locality entering the locality from the east (Patrick) and exiting to the south on the boundary of Ilfracombe and Moombria where it becomes a tributary to the Barcoo River.

The principal land use is grazing on native vegetation.

== History ==
The locality is presumably named after the large pastoral property Barcaldine Downs within its boundaries. It was established as a sheep station in 1863 by Donald Charles Cameron, whose family property in Ayrshire, Scotland, which was named for Barcaldine, Argyll and Bute, Scotland.

== Education ==
There are no schools in Barcaldine Downs. The nearest primary schools are in Barcaldine State School in Barcaldine, Isisford State School in Isisford and Ilfracombe State School in Ilfracombe. The nearest secondary schools are in Barcaldine State High School in Barcaldine and Longreach State High School in Longreach.
