= Pine Hill, Queensland =

Pine Hill Queensland
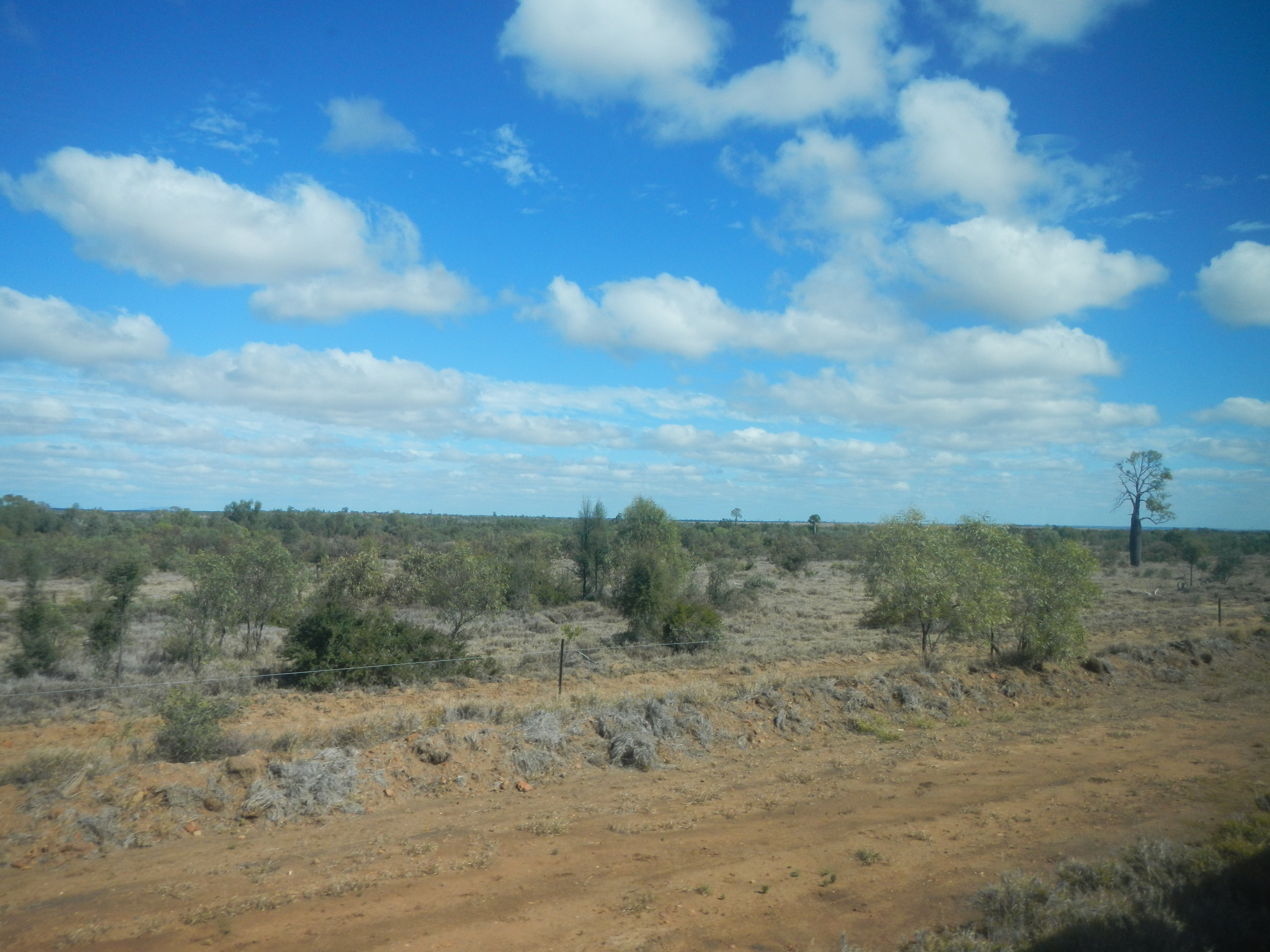
- Grazing land beside the Central Western railway in Pine Hill, 2013

- Coordinates: 23.5055°S 147.1052°E
- Population: 3 (2016 census)
  - Density: 0.0033/km^{2} (0.0086/sq mi)
- Postcode(s): 4724
- Area: 904.9 km^{2} (349.4 sq mi)
- Time zone: AEST (UTC+10:00)
- Location: 67.7 km (42 mi) NW of Alpha; 168 km (104 mi) WNW of Emerald; 208 km (129 mi) E of Barcaldine; 438 km (272 mi) W of Rockhampton; 1,000 km (621 mi) NW of Brisbane
- LGA(s): Barcaldine Region
- State electorate(s): Gregory
- Federal division(s): Maranoa
Suburbs around Pine Hill:
Beaufort	Quetta	Peak Vale
Beaufort	Pine Hill	Willows
Port Wine	Port Wine	Willows

Pine Hill is a former rural locality in the Barcaldine Region, Queensland, Australia. In the 2016 census, Pine Hill had a population of 3 people.

On 22 November 2019, the Queensland Government decided to amalgamate the localities in the Barcaldine Region, resulting in five expanded localities based on the larger towns: Alpha, Aramac, Barcaldine, Jericho and Muttaburra. Pine Hill was incorporated into Alpha.

== Geography ==
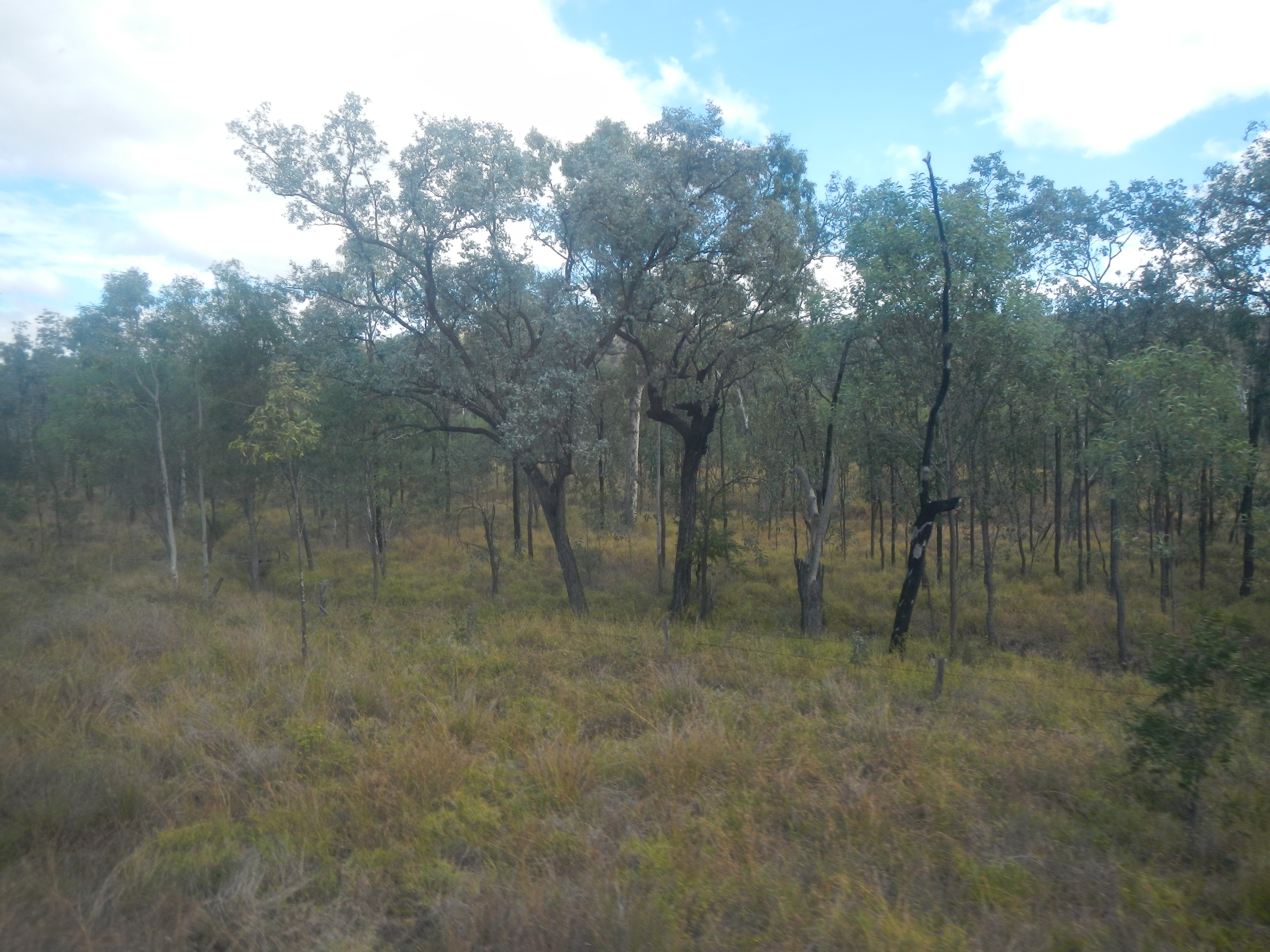
Drummond Range in Pine Hill, 2013

The Central Western railway line forms the southern boundary of the locality with the Capricorn Highway forming the eastern part of the southern boundary.

The Drummond Range forms the western part of the locality. A number of creeks rise in the slopes of the range and flow variously west and north, all eventually becoming tributaries of the Belyando River within the North East Coast drainage basin.

The predominant land use is grazing on native vegetation.

== History ==
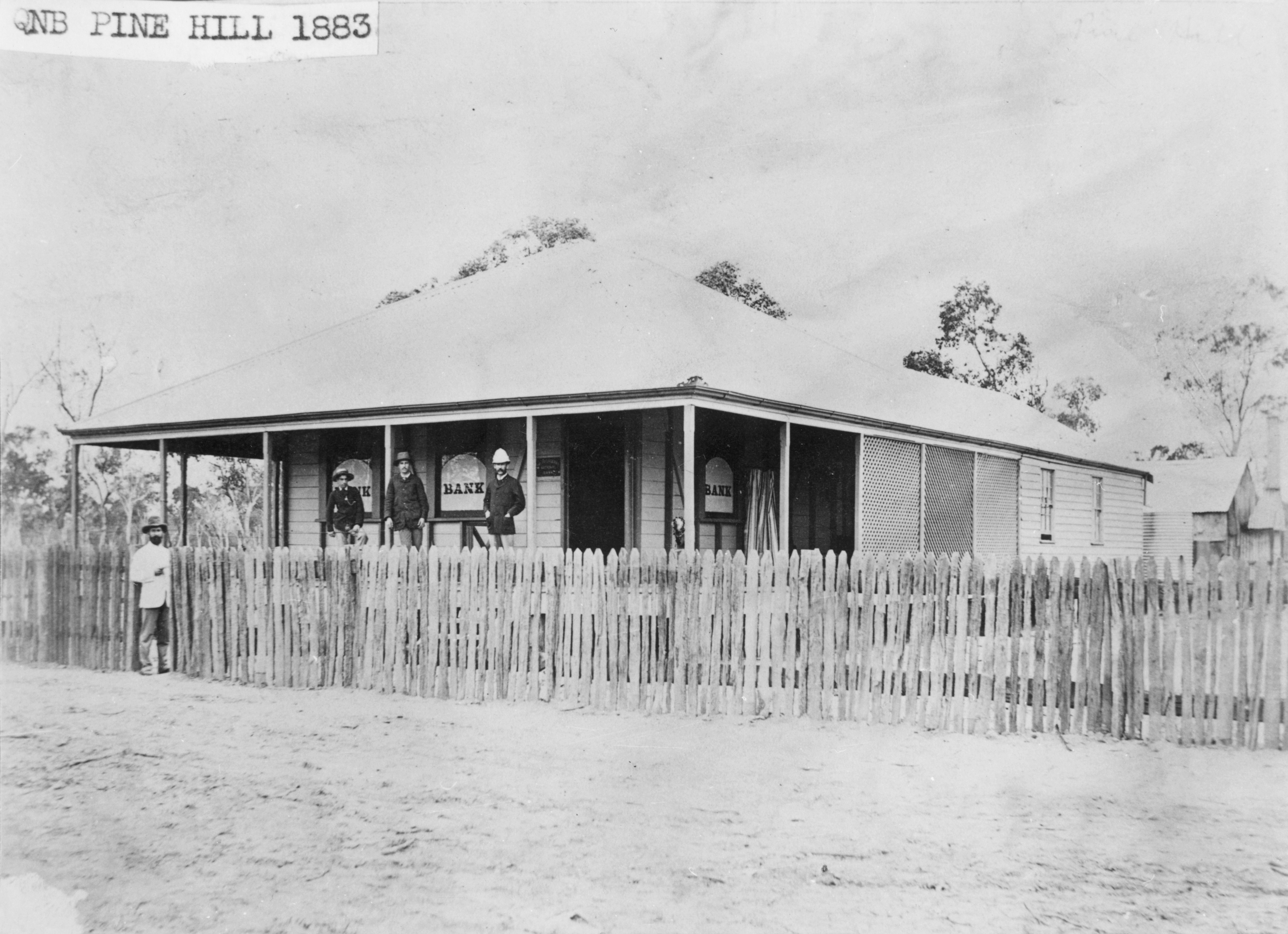
Queensland National Bank, Pine Hill, 1883

The Central Western railway line reached Pine Hill in 1883, with the Pinehill railway station at 23.6503°S 146.9565°E its terminus. The station buildings were completed in July 1883. According to the Queensland Railways Department, the railway station was so named because the surrounding ridges were once covered in cypress pine.

In August 1883 there was a land sale for 56 town lots and 180 country lots at Pine Hill. Yielding nearly £3000, it was a success, with buyers planning to build a hotel and shops in the new town. However, the newspaper of the day speculated that the land might be worthless in two years, presumably in the expectation that Pine Hill would not remain the terminus. The railway line opened on 1 November 1883, and the Queensland National Bank relocated their business there from Bogantungan, the previous terminus, in the same month. The town was described unfavourably in a newspaper article of December 1883:

"There is dust everywhere, not only in the streets but in the houses. You breathe it, you eat it, you drink it, you sniff it, touch what you will it is there. It sometimes almost blinds you, and it will no doubt assist in producing premature deafness in some cases, for your ears get filled with dust and thus all the five senses are affected ... it ought to have been named The Dust Flat".

On 22 September 1884 the railway line had reached its new terminus of Alpha, and Pine Hill was described as "unsuited for permanent settlement", which led to criticism of the Queensland Government for profiting from land sales in short-lived terminus towns like Pine Hill.

Pine Hill State School opened circa 1884 but closed in 1905. It reopened on 25 January 1926 but closed circa 1946.

The town's streets and allotments had been laid out in the area immediately to the south of the railway station and can still be seen on maps, but there is no evidence remaining of any building. It is now the northernmost part of the Port Wine locality.

== Education ==
There are no schools in Pine Hill. The nearest primary school is in Alpha. The nearest secondary school is in Alpha but only to Year 10. The nearest secondary school to Year 12 is in Emerald. Boarding schools and distance education are other options.
