= Tara Station, Queensland =

Tara Station Queensland
- Coordinates: 23.5291°S 144.9427°E
- Population: 10 (2016 census)
  - Density: 0.012/km^{2} (0.030/sq mi)
- Area: 851.0 km^{2} (328.6 sq mi)
- Time zone: AEST (UTC+10:00)
- Location: 36.5 km (23 mi) W of Barcaldine; 73.8 km (46 mi) E of Longreach; 615 km (382 mi) W of Rockhampton; 1,108 km (688 mi) NW of Brisbane
- LGA(s): Barcaldine Region
- State electorate(s): Gregory
- Federal division(s): Maranoa
Suburbs around Tara Station:
Ilfracombe	Ibis	Saltern Creek
Ilfracombe	Tara Station	Barcaldine
Ilfracombe	Barcaldine Downs	Barcaldine Downs

Tara Station is a former rural locality in the Barcaldine Region, Queensland, Australia. In the 2016 census, Tara Station had a population of 10 people.

On 22 November 2019, the Queensland Government decided to amalgamate the localities in the Barcaldine Region, resulting in five expanded localities based on the larger towns: Alpha, Aramac, Barcaldine, Jericho and Muttaburra. Tara Station was incorporated into Barcaldine.

== Geography ==
The Central Western railway and to its immediate south the Capricorn Highway traverse the locality from east (Barcaldine) to west (Ilfracombe).

A ridge that runs from the south-west to the end through Tara Station creates a watershed. The creeks that rise to the north of the ridge are part of the Thomson River basin, while those to the south are part of the Barcoo River basin.

The principal land use is grazing on native vegetation.

== History ==
In March 1889 James Kenneth Cudmore established Tara pastoral station from land resumed from neighbouring pastoral properties: Barcaldine Downs, Saltern Creek and Wellshot. His first flock consisted of 40,000 sheep purchased from Isis Downs. His brother Daniel Cashel Cudmore took over the management of the property in 1913. In October 1950, the property of 87,895 acres (35,570 ha) was sold to A.E. Walker from Corfield near Longreach.

== Education ==
There are no schools in Tara Station. The nearest primary schools are in Barcaldine and Ilfracombe, while the nearest secondary school is in Barcaldine.
