= Moombria, Queensland =

Moombria Queensland
- Coordinates: 24.0625°S 144.9961°E
- Population: 0 (2016 census)
  - Density: 0.0000/km^{2} (0.000/sq mi)
- Postcode(s): 4725
- Area: 209.9 km^{2} (81.0 sq mi)
- Time zone: AEST (UTC+10:00)
- Location: 87.1 km (54 mi) SW of Barcaldine; 111 km (69 mi) NW of Blackall; 666 km (414 mi) W of Rockhampton; 1,076 km (669 mi) NW of Brisbane
- LGA(s): Barcaldine Region
- State electorate(s): Gregory
- Federal division(s): Maranoa
Suburbs around Moombria:
Barcaldine Downs	Barcaldine Downs	Home Creek
Ilfracombe	Moombria	Home Creek
Blackall	Blackall	Blackall

Moombria is a former rural locality in the Barcaldine Region, Queensland, Australia. In the 2016 census, Moombria had a population of 0 people.

On 22 November 2019, the Queensland Government decided to amalgamate the localities in the Barcaldine Region, resulting in five expanded localities based on the larger towns: Alpha, Aramac, Barcaldine, Jericho and Muttaburra. Moombria was incorporated into Barcaldine.

== Geography ==
The Barcoo River forms the southern boundary of the locality while the Alice River forms the western boundary. Their confluence is at the south-western boundary of the locality.

The principal land use is grazing on native vegetation.

== Education ==
There are no schools in Moombria. The nearest primary and secondary schools are in Blackall.
