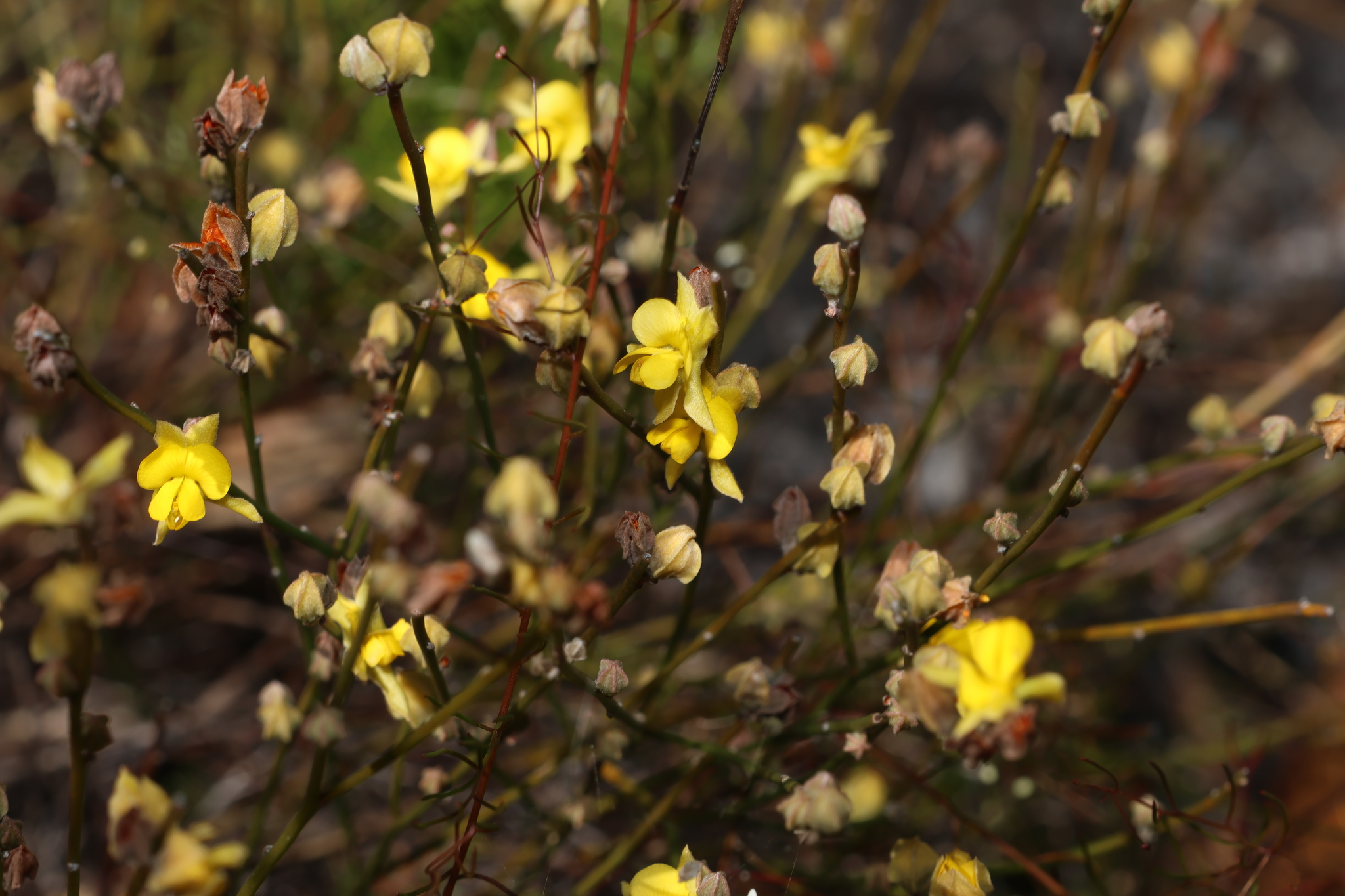

Scientific classification
- Kingdom: Plantae
- Clade: Tracheophytes
- Clade: Angiosperms
- Clade: Eudicots
- Clade: Rosids
- Order: Fabales
- Family: Fabaceae
- Subfamily: Faboideae
- Genus: Jacksonia
- Species: J. stackhousei

Binomial name
- Jacksonia stackhousei F.Muell.

Synonyms
- Jacksonia stackhousii F.Muell. orth. var.; Piptomeris stackhousei (F.Muell.) Greene

= Jacksonia stackhousei =

Wallum dogwood

Species of legume

Jacksonia stackhousei, commonly known as wallum dogwood, is a species of flowering plant in the family Fabaceae and is endemic to eastern Australia. It is a tufted, low-lying shrub with greyish-green branches, the leaves reduced to dark brown, egg-shaped scales pressed against the surface, yellow flowers without markings, and oval pods.

== Description ==
Jacksonia stackhousei is a tufted, low-lying shrub that typically grows up to 0.2–2.5 m (7.9 in – 8 ft 2.4 in) high and 0.5–2 m (1 ft 8 in – 6 ft 7 in) wide. Its leaves are reduced to egg-shaped, dark brown scales, 0.5–1.7 mm (0.020–0.067 in) long and 0.6–1.2 mm (0.024–0.047 in) wide with toothed edges. The flowers are scattered along the branchlets or on the ends of branchlets on pedicels 0.9–3.3 mm (0.035–0.130 in) long, with egg-shaped bracteoles 1.2–1.7 mm (0.047–0.067 in) long and 0.8–1 mm (0.031–0.039 in) wide on the upper pedicels. The floral tube is 0.6–1.1 mm (0.024–0.043 in) long and not ribbed, and the sepals are membranous, with the upper lobes 2–5.5 mm (0.079–0.217 in) long, 2.9–3.4 mm (0.11–0.13 in) wide, the lower lobes 5.8–6.0 mm (0.23–0.24 in) long and 1.1–1.4 mm (0.043–0.055 in) wide and fused for 0.6–1.1 mm (0.024–0.043 in). The flowers are yellow, without markings, the standard petal 4.2–4.5 mm (0.17–0.18 in) long and 6.8–7.6 mm (0.27–0.30 in) deep, the wings 5.5–5.6 mm (0.22–0.22 in) long, and the keel 4.5–4.7 mm (0.18–0.19 in) long. The stamens have red filaments, 2.5–5.3 mm (0.098–0.209 in) long. Flowering occurs from May to November, and the fruit is a sessile, oval pod up to 5 mm (0.20 in) long and hidden in the remains of the sepals.

== Taxonomy ==
Jacksonia stackhousei was first formally described in 1876 by Ferdinand von Mueller in the Proceedings of the Linnean Society of New South Wales from specimens collected near the entrance to the Clarence River by Captain T. Stackhouse.

== Distribution and habitat ==
Wallum dogwood grows in coastal heath and woodland on white sand over sandstone from Shoalwater Bay in south-eastern Queensland to near Wooli in northern New South Wales.

== Conservation status ==
Jacksonia stackhousei is listed as of "least concern" under the Queensland Government Nature Conservation Act 1992.
