= Barcaldine War Memorial Clock =

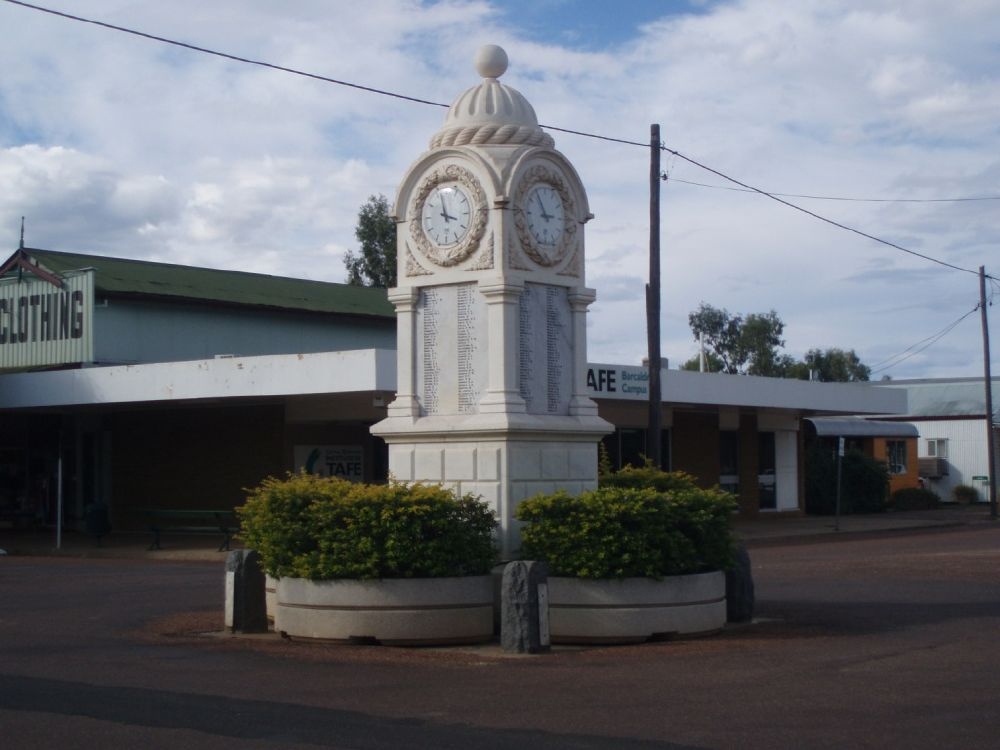
- Barcaldine War Memorial Clock, 2009

- Location within Queensland
- 23.5536°S 145.2885°E
- Location: Ash Street, Barcaldine, Barcaldine Region, Queensland, Australia

History
- Design period: 1919–1930s (interwar period)
- Built: 1924

Site notes
- Architect: Andrew Lang Petrie and Son

Queensland Heritage Register
- Official name: Barcaldine War Memorial Clock
- Type: state heritage (built)
- Designated: 21 October 1992
- Reference no.: 600018
- Significant period: 1924–
- Significant components: clock, memorial – clock tower, views to
- Builders: Andrew Lang Petrie and Son

Barcaldine War Memorial Clock is a heritage-listed memorial at Ash Street, Barcaldine, Barcaldine Region, Queensland, Australia. It was designed and built in 1924 by monumental masons Andrew Lang Petrie and Son. It was added to the Queensland Heritage Register on 21 October 1992.

== History ==
The Barcaldine War Memorial Clock, a major regional memorial was unveiled on 21 May 1924 by the then Governor of Queensland, Sir Matthew Nathan. It was designed and executed by Andrew Lang Petrie, monumental masons of Toowong, Brisbane at a cost of £524. The marble and granite memorial honours the 292 local men who served during the First World War, including the 38 fallen.

Settlement in the area of Barcaldine began in 1886 due to the extension of the Central Western Railway. In 1891 the town was the site of one of Queensland's most significant events, the shearer's strike which caused widespread unrest and ultimately lead to the formation of the Australian Labour Party. Shortly after this, artesian water was discovered, causing an influx of people followed by a rush of development, including a brewery, meat processing plants and other new industries.

Australia, and Queensland in particular, had few civic monuments before the First World War. The memorials erected in its wake became our first national monuments, recording the devastating impact of the war on a young nation. Australia lost 60,000 from a population of about 4 million, representing one in five of those who served. No previous or subsequent war has made such an impact on the nation.

Even before the end of the war, memorials became a spontaneous and highly visible expression of national grief. To those who erected them, they were as sacred as grave sites, substitute graves for the Australians whose bodies lay in battlefield cemeteries in Europe and the Middle East. British policy decreed that the Empire war dead were to be buried where they fell. The word "cenotaph", commonly applied to war memorials at the time, literally means "empty tomb".

Australian war memorials are distinctive in that they commemorate not only the dead. Australians were proud that their first great national army, unlike other belligerent armies, was composed entirely of volunteers, men worthy of honour whether or not they paid the supreme sacrifice. Many memorials honour all who served from a locality, not just the dead, providing valuable evidence of community involvement in the war. Such evidence is not readily obtainable from military records, or from state or national listings, where names are categorised alphabetically or by military unit.

Australian war memorials are also valuable evidence of imperial and national loyalties, at the time, not seen as conflicting; the skills of local stonemasons, metalworkers and architects; and of popular taste. In Queensland, the digger (soldier) statue was the popular choice of memorial, whereas the obelisk predominated in the southern states, possibly a reflection of Queensland's larger working-class population and a lesser involvement of architects.

Many of the First World War monuments have been updated to record local involvement in later conflicts, and some have fallen victim to unsympathetic re-location and repair.

Although many different types of war memorials were erected throughout Queensland, there are few of the clock type. The form of a clock was decided upon by public ballot held in 1922 after the Barcaldine Shire Council initiated the proposal for a memorial.

This is a particularly ornate type of war memorials. Although no others have been located in Queensland, the design is described in A L Petrie's records as clock tower number two design. The monument was originally surrounded by four granite posts, however these have been removed at some stage, as has the original street light. In 1992, the monument was damaged by a storm and the clocks were replaced by Synchronome Pty Ltd.

A L Petrie and Son were the largest monumental masonry firm in Queensland at this time and produced many memorials throughout the state.

== Description ==
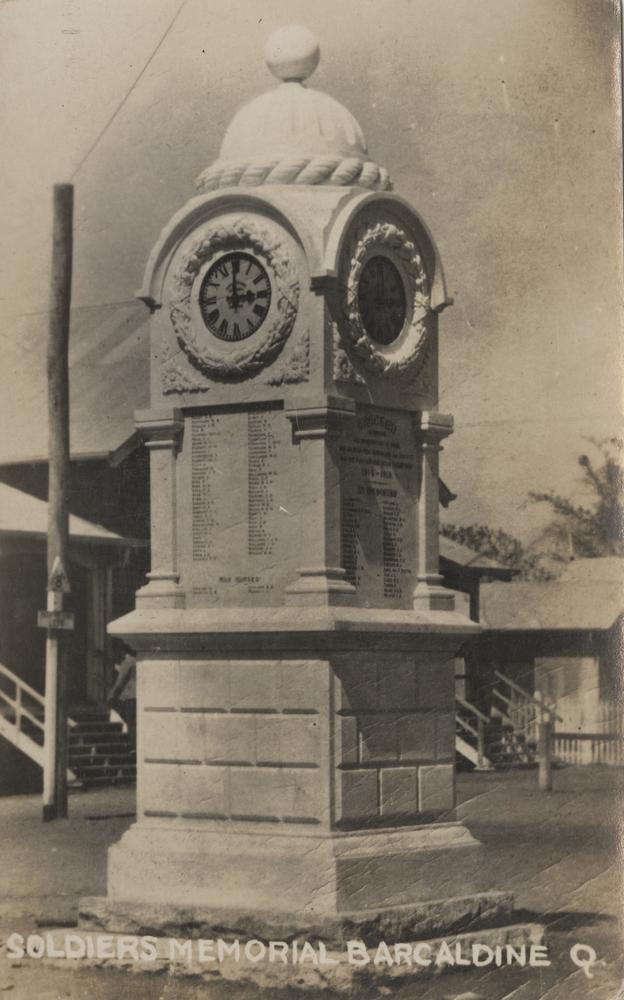
Barcaldine War Memorial Clock, circa 1928

The First World War Memorial is situated in the middle of the intersection of Ash and Beech Streets, Barcaldine and is a dominant feature in the streetscape. It stands on a concrete pad with rough hewn stone posts at each corner.

The memorial stands 12 feet (3.7 m) high and comprises a base surmounted by a pedestal and clock.

The marble (probably Ulam) memorial sits on a stepped base of rough hewn granite. Above this is a smooth faced marble step capped with cyma recta mouldings and a leaded unveiling inscription on the front face. This is surmounted by a marble plinth carved to represent chamfered blocks and capped with a simple cornice.

Rising from the plinth is the pedestal comprising recessed square plates of a finer marble with engaged pillars at each corner. The recessed plates bear the leaded names of the 292 local men who served in the first World War, including the 38 fallen whose names are recorded on the front face.

The clock sits above the pedestal. There is a clock face on all four faces which are illuminated at night. Each face is surrounded by a laurel wreath and foliated carving is located in the bottom corners. A hood mould over each face creates a domed surface on which sits a large cable moulding. This is crowned by a smaller dome surmounted by a marble sphere.

The dials of the four clock faces are driven from a master clock with an electrically-driven pendulum housed in the Barcaldine Shire Hall.

== Heritage listing ==
Barcaldine War Memorial Clock was listed on the Queensland Heritage Register on 21 October 1992 having satisfied the following criteria.

The place is important in demonstrating the evolution or pattern of Queensland's history.

War Memorials are important in demonstrating the pattern of Queensland's history as they are representative of a recurrent theme that involved most communities throughout the state. They provide evidence of an era of widespread Australian patriotism and nationalism, particularly during and following the First World War. The monuments manifest a unique documentary record and are demonstrative of popular taste in the inter-war period.

The place demonstrates rare, uncommon or endangered aspects of Queensland's cultural heritage.

This memorial is of particular significance as it is one of the few clock type war memorials and the only one of this style in Queensland.

The place is important in demonstrating the principal characteristics of a particular class of cultural places.

Erected in 1924, the memorial at Barcaldine demonstrates the principal characteristics of a commemorative structure erected as an enduring record of a major historical event. This is achieved through the use of appropriate materials and design elements.

The place is important because of its aesthetic significance.

It is of aesthetic significance both as a dominant landmark in the streetscape and for its high level of workmanship, materials and design.

The place has a strong or special association with a particular community or cultural group for social, cultural or spiritual reasons.

The Barcaldine memorial has a strong and continuing association with the community as evidence of the impact of a major historic event and as the focal point for the remembrance of that event

The place has a special association with the life or work of a particular person, group or organisation of importance in Queensland's history.

It also has special association with monumental masonry firm A L Petrie and Son as an example of their workmanship.
