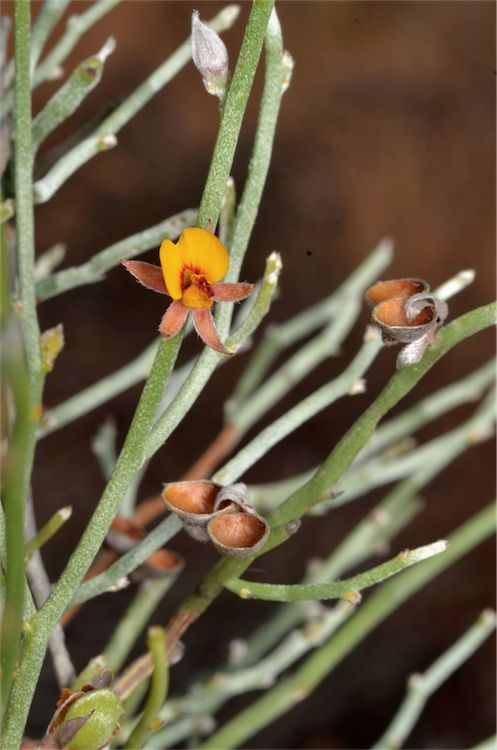

Scientific classification
- Kingdom: Plantae
- Clade: Tracheophytes
- Clade: Angiosperms
- Clade: Eudicots
- Clade: Rosids
- Order: Fabales
- Family: Fabaceae
- Subfamily: Faboideae
- Genus: Jacksonia
- Species: J. rhadinoclona

Binomial name
- Jacksonia rhadinoclona F.Muell.

Synonyms
- Jacksonia turnerana G.M.Cunn., W.E.Mulham, P.L.Milthorpe & J.H.Leigh orth. var.; Jacksonia turneriana Domin; Jacksonia vernicosa var. rhadinoclona F.Muell. nom. alt.; Piptomeris rhadinoclona (F.Muell.) Greene

= Jacksonia rhadinoclona =

Miles dogwood

Species of legume

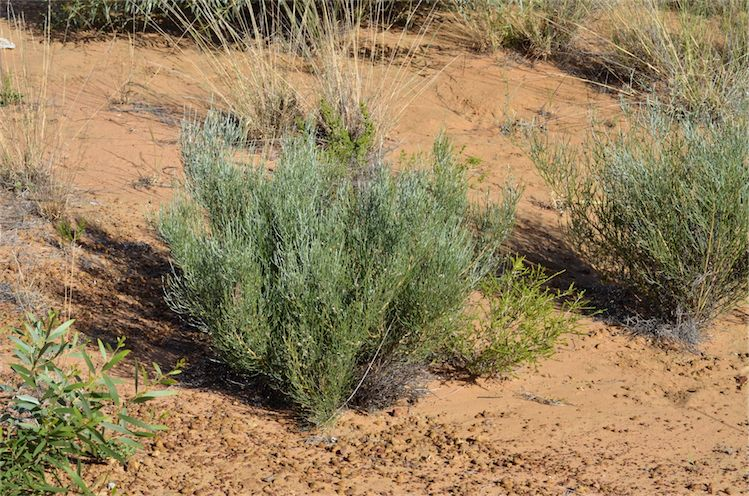
Habit near Aramac

Jacksonia rhadinoclona, commonly known as Miles dogwood, dwarf dogwood or western dogwood, is a species of flowering plant in the family Fabaceae and is endemic to inland areas of eastern Australia. It is an erect to spreading, spindly shrub with greyish-green branches, the leaves reduced to dark brown, egg-shaped scales pressed against the surface, yellow-orange flowers with red markings, and woody, densely hairy, oval pods.

== Description ==
Jacksonia rhadinoclona is an erect to spreading, spindly shrub that typically grows up to 0.2–2 m (7.9 in – 6 ft 6.7 in) high and 0.6 m (2 ft 0 in) wide. It has many greyish-green branches, its leaves reduced to egg-shaped, dark brown scales, 1.2–2.0 mm (0.047–0.079 in) long and 0.8–1.2 mm (0.031–0.047 in) wide. The flowers are scattered along the branches on pedicels 1.4–3.3 mm (0.055–0.130 in) long, with egg-shaped bracteoles 1.0–1.8 mm (0.039–0.071 in) long and 0.8–1 mm (0.031–0.039 in) wide at the base of the sepals The floral tube is 0.7–1.1 mm (0.028–0.043 in) long and ribbed, and the sepals are membranous, with lobes 5.5–7 mm (0.22–0.28 in) long, 3.4–4.5 mm (0.13–0.18 in) wide and fused for 0.8–0.9 mm (0.031–0.035 in). The standard petal is yellow-orange with red markings, 5.1–5.9 mm (0.20–0.23 in) long and 7.9–11 mm (0.31–0.43 in) deep, the wings yellow-orange with red markings 3–5.5 mm (0.12–0.22 in) long, and the keel is red or purple, 3.1–5.2 mm (0.12–0.20 in) long. The stamens have red filaments, 3.0–4.5 mm (0.12–0.18 in) long. Flowering occurs from March to November, and the fruit is an oval, woody, densely hairy pod 3.7–5.5 mm (0.15–0.22 in) long and 3.0–3.4 mm (0.12–0.13 in) wide.

== Taxonomy ==
Jacksonia rhadinoclona was first formally described in 1876 by Ferdinand von Mueller in his Fragmenta Phytographiae Australiae from specimens collected near Cape Byron. Von Mueller gave the species the alternative name Jacksonia vernicosa var. rhadinoclona.

== Distribution and habitat ==
Miles dogwood grows in open woodland on sand over sandstone from near Hughenden in central Queensland to north-east of Bourke in northern New South Wales.

== Conservation status ==
Jacksonia rhadinoclona is listed as of "least concern" under the Queensland Government Nature Conservation Act 1992.
