= Jacksonia chappilliae =

Scientific classification
- Kingdom: Plantae
- Clade: Tracheophytes
- Clade: Angiosperms
- Clade: Eudicots
- Clade: Rosids
- Order: Fabales
- Family: Fabaceae
- Subfamily: Faboideae
- Genus: Jacksonia
- Species: J. chappilliae

Binomial name
- Jacksonia chappilliae C.F.Wilkins

Synonyms
- Jacksonia scoparia var. parviflora Benth.; Jacksonia sp. Little Plain (Williams 94233)

Species of legume

Habit near Koreelah National Park

Jacksonia chappilliae is a species of flowering plant in the family Fabaceae and is endemic to a restricted area of northern New South Wales. It is an erect shrub with its end-branches sharply-pointed phylloclades, and yellow-orange flowers with red markings scattered along the branches.

== Description ==
Jacksonia chappilliae is an erect shrub that typically grows up to 0.25–2 m (9.8 in – 6 ft 6.7 in) high and 0.25–1.5 m (9.8 in – 4 ft 11.1 in) wide and has many stems. The end branches are sharply-pointed, densely hairy, erect and winged. Its leaves are reduced to scales, 0.35–1.1 mm (0.014–0.043 in) long and 0.3–0.8 mm (0.012–0.031 in) wide. The flowers are scattered along the branches, each flower on a pedicel 2.3–3.8 mm (0.091–0.150 in) long, with egg-shaped bracteoles 0.4–0.6 mm (0.016–0.024 in) long and 0.35–0.6 mm (0.014–0.024 in) wide with toothed edges. The floral tube is 0.6–0.8 mm (0.024–0.031 in) long and the sepals are membraneous and deep red, with lobes 3.0–3.4 mm (0.12–0.13 in) long and 0.9–1.6 mm (0.035–0.063 in) wide, the upper lobes longer and wider than the lower lobes. The flowers are yellow-orange with red markings, the standard petal 5.0–5.4 mm (0.20–0.21 in) long and 7.5–10.2 mm (0.30–0.40 in) wide, the wings 5.0–5.7 mm (0.20–0.22 in) long, and the keel 4.3–6.1 mm (0.17–0.24 in) long. The stamens have yellowish-green filaments and are 2.3–5.3 mm (0.091–0.209 in) long. Flowering occurs from September to November, and the fruit is a membraneous, densely hairy pod 4.5–7.0 mm (0.18–0.28 in) long and 2.5–4.0 mm (0.098–0.157 in) wide.

== Taxonomy ==
Jacksonia chappilliae was first formally described in 2007 by Carolyn F. Wilkins in Australian Systematic Botany from specimens collected by John Beaumont Williams west of Woodenbong in 1994. The specific epithet (chappilliae) honours Jennifer Anne Chappill, the principal research scientist in the revision of Jacksonia.

== Distribution and habitat ==
This species of Jacksonia grows in heath and scrub on trachyte outcrops and is only known from the Woodenbong and Koreelah districts in far northern New South Wales.
