= Qantas Hangar, Longreach =

Qantas Hangar
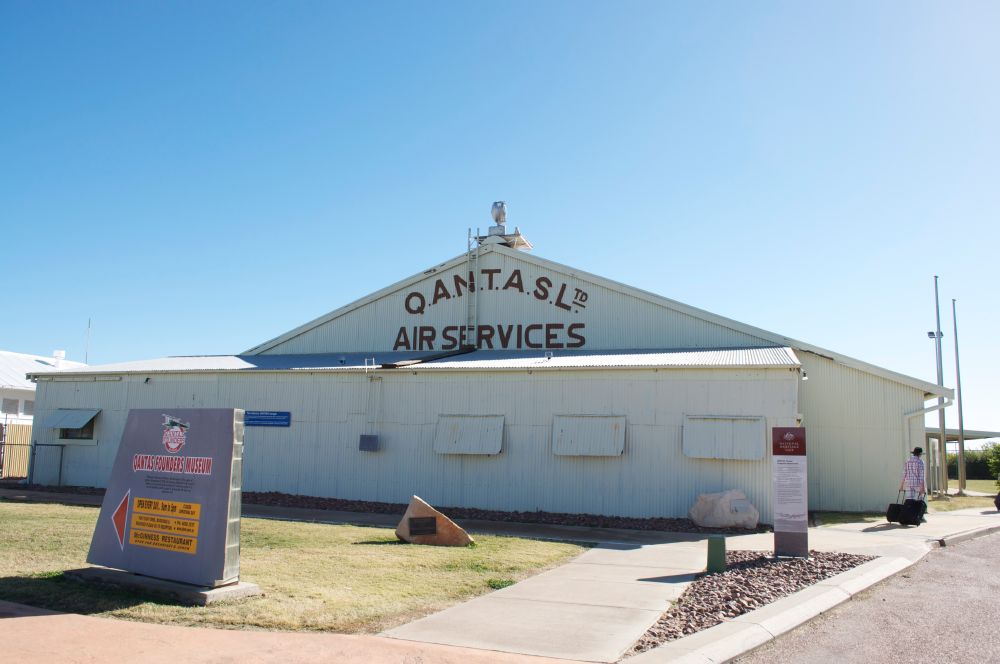
- Qantas Hangar, 2011

- Location within Queensland Location within Australia
- 23.4395°S 144.2708°E
- Location: Landsborough Highway, Longreach, Longreach Region, Queensland, Australia

History
- Design period: 1919–1930s (interwar period)
- Built: 1922–1922

Queensland Heritage Register
- Official name: Qantas Museum/Former Qantas Hangar, Qantas Hangar
- Type: state heritage (landscape, built)
- Designated: 21 October 1992
- Reference no.: 600664
- Significant period: 1920s–1930s (historical); 1922–ongoing (social); 1920s (fabric)
- Significant components: views to, office/s, hangar

Qantas Hangar is a heritage-listed former hangar and now museum at Landsborough Highway, Longreach, Longreach Region, Queensland, Australia. It was built in 1922. It is now part of the Qantas Founders Museum. It was added to the Queensland Heritage Register on 21 October 1992.

== History ==
The town of Longreach was gazetted in 1887 as the new terminus of the Central Western railway line extending west from Rockhampton. Prior to this, the site of Longreach was a teamsters stop; however the completion of the railway in 1892 provided the impetus for the rapid development of the town.

Interest in air transport was accelerated after the First World War. In 1919, the Australian Government offered £10,000 to the first Australian who completed the flight from England to Australia in twenty-eight days. Two returned pilots, Wilmot Hudson Fysh and Paul Joseph McGinness, with their former flight sergeant Arthur Baird as engineer, were prepared to attempt the flight but had to abandon their plans when their financial benefactor died shortly after the start of their attempt. Fysh and McGinness were experienced pilots, having been awarded with the Distinguished Flying Cross whilst serving in the Australian Flying Corps. They had also served in the Australian Light Horse and landed at Gallipoli in 1915.

Unable to take part in the race, the two pilots were subsequently employed by the Department of Defence to survey the route for the race contestants. This took them through western Queensland and the Northern Territory and it was during this exploration that they realised the potential for an air service linking outback towns not linked by rail.

In mid 1920, Fysh and McGinness decided to establish an air taxi and joy ride (for pleasure) service from Cloncurry. They met with grazier Fergus McMaster and two other backers from the Longreach area, who agreed to become financially involved in the project.

The Queensland and Northern Territory Aerial Services Limited (Qantas) was registered in November 1920 and the first official meeting was held at the Winton Club. Arthur Baird rejoined Fysh and McGinness as engineer and became the backbone of Qantas in the early years. In the same year, the company moved to Longreach, as it was a more central position from which to operate. Business was slow at first, as most of the interest was in joy rides which, in the early days of aviation, were expensive and sometimes dangerous. However, support from McMaster and the newly formed Country Party, as well as pressure from shire and municipal councils compelled the Australian Government to announce a tender for a mail run from Charleville to Cloncurry. Qantas won this tender in February 1922.

The first office in Longreach was located in Eagle Street. After this building was destroyed by fire, the office was moved to a temporary building in Duck Street before relocating to the Graziers Building across the street in May 1922. The first hangar was constructed near the site of the showgrounds in 1921. However, the contract for the mail service necessitated larger premises and a contract for a new hangar was won by Stewarts and Lloyds in March 1922. The hangar was completed in August 1922 and the inaugural mail service flight was made in November of the same year.

The new hangar was erected on the site of the new aerodrome which was one and a half miles east of the town. Constructed of a tubular steel frame with galvanised iron cladding, it measured 120 by 60 feet (37 by 18 m) and cost £1 637. It initially had a dirt floor, but by 1924 when town water was connected, most of the floor had been concreted. The existing hangar near the showgrounds was dismantled and re-erected on the new site as offices and a store.

The mail service was extended to Camooweal and Normanton in the mid 1920s and the flying service grew to include transportation of food and people in times of flood and acted as an aerial ambulance in emergencies.

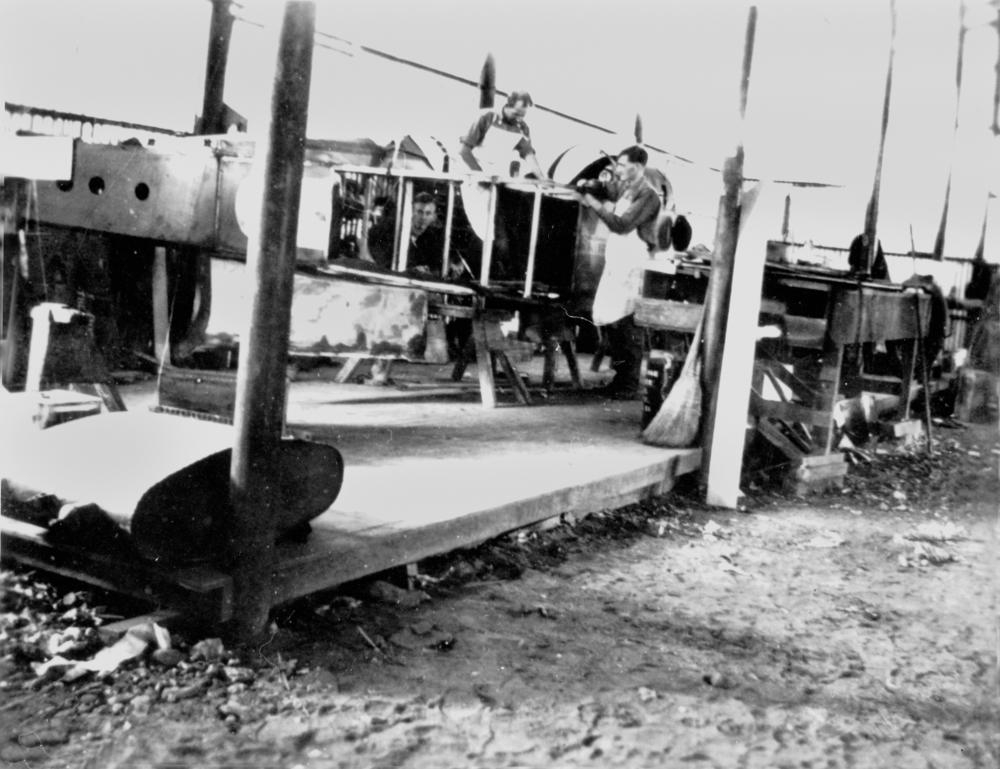
Construction of a Qantas aeroplane at Longreach, circa 1928

In 1926, the development of aerial communications throughout the Commonwealth was encouraged during an Imperial Conference in London, resulting in Prime Minister Stanley Bruce increasing the budget for civil aviation. In the same year, production of DH50 aeroplanes under licence from de Havilland commenced in the Longreach hangar. Although this practice ceased in 1929 when the DH50s were superseded by the more complex DH61s, the construction of aeroplanes became a secondary industry in the grazing district, creating jobs for many local people. This new use necessitated extensions to the hangar which included the additions of workshops at the sides and sliding doors to the front.

In June 1930, Qantas ended its occupation of the Longreach hangar when the headquarters were moved to Brisbane. This move was generated by the realisation that a takeover was imminent if they remained a small outback company. In 1934, Qantas merged with Imperial Airways.

During the Second World War, the hangar was used by the Royal Australian Air Force and subsequently by the United States Air Force. After the war, the hangar became a terminal for the domestic services of various airlines, including local Longreach airline, Somerset Airways.

The most extensive alterations were carried out in the 1960s when a passenger terminal comprising a waiting room, a trolley way for baggage and offices was constructed at the north east corner of the building. At the same time, the roof sheeting, purlins and primary roof trusses were replaced and additional purlins were installed. The plans for these alteration were drawn by the Commonwealth Department in 1960; however the work was not completed until 1963.

The signage to the gable ends has been repainted a number of times. The Allom Lovell Marquis-Kyle Conservation Plan states that the positions of the gables were reversed during the 1963 alterations and that the signs were repainted in 1963, 1969 and 1972. The 1969 repainting included the painting over of the sign on the southern end which originally read Qantas Empire Airlines, the name resulting from the 1934 merge with Imperial Airways to enable international flights to England.

The hangar remained in use until 1996 when it was altered for re-use as the Qantas Founders Museum illustrating the history of Qantas.

== Description ==
The Qantas hangar is located at the Longreach Airport, on the western side of the complex and is a large, freestanding structure which forms a dominant landmark in the area.

The hangar comprises a large open space, or hangarage, with annexes on either side and at the rear. The hangarage has a light frame of tubular steel which comprises a series of trusses supporting a gable roof with a ventilated ridge. The roof trusses are only supported by columns where the roof has been extended over the side annexes. The gable at each end of the hangar is also sheeted with corrugated iron and painted with the words QANTAS LTD on the northern (front) end and QANTAS LTD AIR SERVICES on the southern (rear) end.

At each side of the front elevation are new steel frames which support the recently constructed sliding doors when opened.

Internally, the hangarage has a concrete floor, whilst the floors to the annexes are of timber boards. The walls and roof of the hangarage and annexes are clad in galvanised corrugated iron and openings are cut in the walls in some areas to allow light to enter the interior. Windows in the form of corrugated iron flaps, hinged at the top are located down each side and at the rear of the annexes. The western annexe has been altered to accommodate offices and amenities associated with the operation of the place as a museum.

== Heritage listing ==
The former Qantas Hangar was listed on the Queensland Heritage Register on 21 October 1992 having satisfied the following criteria.

The place is important in demonstrating the evolution or pattern of Queensland's history.

The Qantas Hangar at Longreach was constructed in 1922 on the second site of then fledgling airline, Queensland and Northern Territory Aerial Service. Originally established in Winton, Qantas relocated to Longreach shortly after its registration. The hangar provides a tangible link with pioneering air services in Australia and demonstrates the evolution of air services in Australia as well as the development of the history of Queensland.

The place demonstrates rare, uncommon or endangered aspects of Queensland's cultural heritage.

It is rare as one of the few surviving structures associated with the establishment of Qantas, now one of the largest international airlines, and as one of the earliest aviation sites in Australia.

The place is important in demonstrating the principal characteristics of a particular class of cultural places.

The large uninterrupted space of the hangarage and the adjoining annexes demonstrates the principal characteristics of a structures of its type.

The place is important because of its aesthetic significance.

The hangar is of aesthetic significance as a landmark in the area, The simplicity of its design and construction also contributes to its aesthetic value.

The place has a strong or special association with a particular community or cultural group for social, cultural or spiritual reasons.

It has strong associations with the community of Longreach.

The place has a special association with the life or work of a particular person, group or organisation of importance in Queensland's history.

It has strong associations with the development of aviation in Australia. It also has special association with the founders of Qantas, W Hudson Fysh and Paul J McGinness, and engineer Arthur Baird.

=== Q150 icon ===
In 2009 as part of the Q150 celebrations, the Qantas Hangar was announced as one of the Q150 Icons of Queensland for its role as a "structure and engineering feat".
