= Hugh Lunn =

Australian journalist and author (born 1941)

Hugh Duncan Lunn (born 1941 in Brisbane, Queensland) is an Australian journalist and author.

== Writing career ==
=== Early journalism ===
Lunn served his journalism cadetship with The Courier-Mail. Upon completing his cadetship, he worked overseas for seven years. During 1967 and 1968 he covered the Vietnam War for Reuters. In 1969 Lunn reported on the Act of Free Choice in West Papua while as Reuters correspondent in Indonesia.

On returning to Australia he became Queensland editor of The Australian. Over the course of the next two decades Lunn was in turn sacked and re-employed by Rupert Murdoch's newspaper a number of times. Finding himself without employment at the age of 47, he began to pen a memoir about his childhood.

=== Author ===
Lunn is now famous in Queensland for a number of autobiographical books: in June 2009 he was voted a Queensland Icon as one of 15 "influential artists" in the state's history in a list of 15 which included the Bee Gees, Geoffrey Rush, Powderfinger and David Malouf. The best known of his memoirs is Over The Top With Jim. Published in 1989, it became the biggest-selling non-fiction book in Australia for 1991. It tells the story of his Brisbane childhood and his friendship with Jim Egoroff and Ken Fletcher. After reading the book Egoroff is said to have visited Lunn and threatened to "punish you for your sins".

In 1994, A sandstone carving by Brisbane artist Dr. Rhyl Hinwood was erected on the University of Queensland campus to celebrate the publication by UQP of several of Lunn's national bestsellers.

In 2015, Lunn was inducted as a Fellow of the Queensland Academy of Arts and Sciences.

Lunn is famous for coining the phrase "there is no such thing as an ex-Queenslander", which he first used when in November 1979 when discussing with Senator Ron McAuliffe, President of the QRL, on a 90-minute plane trip from Brisbane to Canberra, the viability of a State of Origin series.

In 2019, three off-Broadway performances of The State of Origin Musical! – written by Hugh Lunn with comedian and composer Gerry Connolly – were performed at The Princess Theatre in Annerley Road, Woolloongabba, a stage on which Hugh had debuted as a tap-dancer, 70-something years earlier.

== Awards ==
- Walkley Award (1974) (for six feature articles dealing with the Brisbane floods)
- Walkley Award (1975) (for feature on "Why Queensland is Different").
- Walkley Award (1979) (for a series of articles from Australia, Hong Kong, Cambodia and Malaysia on Vietnamese boat refugees)
- Special AMA Award for a 1979 Medical Article "The Re-making of Robert Hoge"
- National Press Club Best Sports Feature Award (1979) (for "The Maroon Avengers")
- The Age Book of the Year Award 1985 for Vietnam: A Reporter's War
- In 2009 as part of the Q150 celebrations, Hugh Lunn was announced as one of the Q150 Icons of Queensland for his role as an "Influential Artists".
- In November 2018 Lunn was inducted into The Australian Media Hall of Fame at a dinner in Melbourne.

== Publishing record ==
- Joh: The Life and Political Adventures of Johannes Bjelke-Petersen, 1978
- Behind the Banana Curtain, 1980
- Four Stories: About Aboriginal Australians in Queensland, 1982
- Queenslanders, 1984
- Vietnam: A Reporter's War, 1985
- Over The Top With Jim, 1989
- More Over The Top With Jim Stories, 1992
- The Over The Top With Jim Album, 1995
- Head Over Heels, University of Queensland Press 1992 ISBN 0-7022-2418-9
- Fred and Olive's Blessed Lino, University of Queensland Press 1993 ISBN 0-7022-2575-4
- Spies Like Us, University of Queensland Press 1995 ISBN 0-7022-2757-9
- Working for Rupert, Hodder Headline 2001
- On the Road to Anywhere, Hodder Headline 2003
- Lost for Words, ABC Books 2006 ISBN 0-7333-1759-6
- The Great Fletch, ABC Books 2008
- Words Fail Me, ABC Books, 2010
