= Longest fence in the world =

The longest fence in the world can refer to:

- The Dingo Fence of south-east Australia, 5,614 km (3,488 mi) finished in 1885
- The Rabbit-proof fence of Western Australia, 3,253 km (2,021 mi), completed in 1907
