= Apple & Grape Harvest Festival =

Biennial festival in Stanthorpe, Australia

- Status: Active
- Begins: February 23, 2024
- Ends: March 3, 2024
- Frequency: Biennial
- Locations: Stanthorpe, Queensland
- Coordinates: 28.6547°S 151.935°E
- Country: Australia
- Years active: 60
- Inaugurated: 1966
- Attendance: 50,000
- Website: appleandgrape.org

The Apple & Grape Harvest Festival is a biennial festival held in Stanthorpe, Queensland, Australia, taking place over 10 days at the beginning of March. It is one of Queensland's longest-running festivals, first held in 1966 as a celebration of the Granite Belt region’s wine and produce industry.

The event is regularly attended by an average of over 50,000 people, with highlights of the week long festival including grape crushing, a food and wine fiesta, live music, apple peeling competitions, a grand parade, fireworks and markets.

== History ==
The Apple & Grape Harvest Festival was born out of the Apple Blossom Festival in 1966, itself born of the "Back to Stanthorpe Week" celebrations in 1954.

The Queensland Grape Crushing Championships have been a highlight of the festival since 1984.

Traditionally the festival would commence with a ball, during which a Festival Queen and Charity Queen, who would represent the district for the following two years, were announced. In 2002 this was changed to become the Young Ambassador and included male entrants.

In 2009 as part of the Q150 celebrations, the Apple & Grape Harvest Festival was announced as one of the Q150 Icons of Queensland for its role as an "event and festival".

== 2024 Event ==
The festival will be returning in 2024, taking place from the 23rd February - 3 March 2022.

The event will feature the Queensland Country Bank Food and Wine Fiesta and the Grand Parade festival finale on the final weekend of 1–3 March. A highlight is the grape crushing event held for the public and also the spectacle of the Celebrity Grape Crushing Championships sponsored by Balancing Heart Vineyard.

The Finals of the Australian National Busking Championships will be taking place on during the festival on the 23rd February 2024.
