= Dingo Fence =

Large pest-exclusion fence in Australia

- Australia
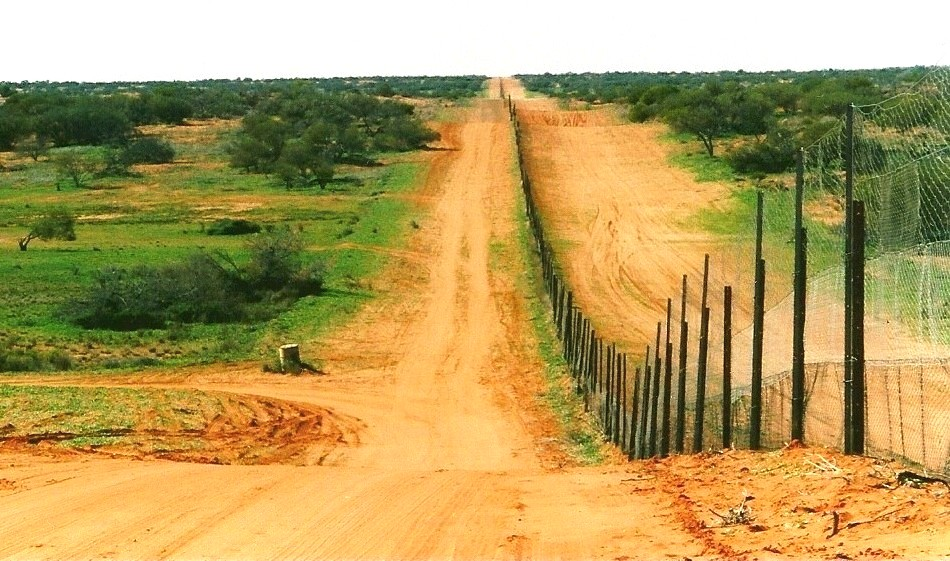
- Dingo Fence on the 29th parallel south in Sturt National Park (right of fence), looking east from Cameron Corner

Site information
- Type: Fence

Location
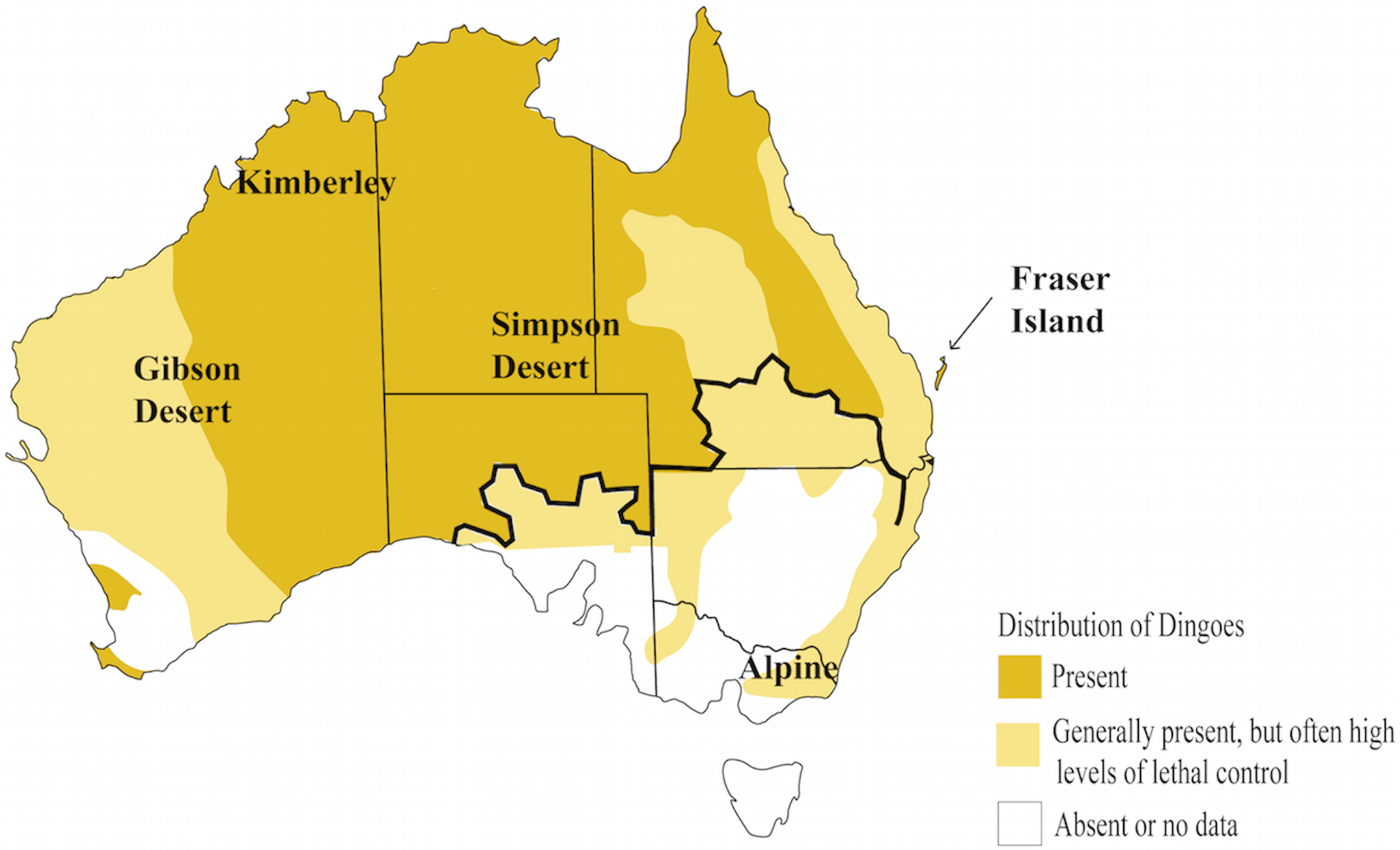
- Route of the Dingo Fence (black)
- Length: 5,614 km

Site history
- Built: 1880–85
- Materials: Wire mesh

The Dingo Fence or Dog Fence is a pest-exclusion fence in Australia to keep dingoes out of the relatively fertile south-east part of the continent (where they have largely been exterminated) and protect the sheep flocks of southern Queensland.

The longest fence in the world, it stretches 5,614 kilometres (3,488 mi) from Jimbour on the Darling Downs near Dalby, through thousands of kilometres of arid land, ending west of Eyre peninsula on cliffs of the Nullarbor Plain above the Great Australian Bight near Nundroo.

It has been partly successful, though dingoes can still be found in parts of the southern states. Although the fence has helped reduce losses of sheep to predators, this has been countered by holes in fences found in the 1990s through which dingo offspring have passed and by increased pasture competition from rabbits and kangaroos.

== History ==
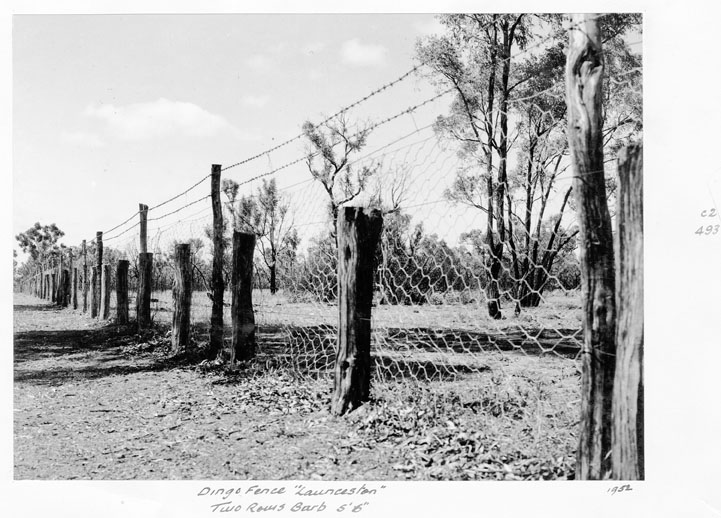
A portion of the Dingo Fence in 1952 in Queensland

The earliest pest exclusion fences in Australia were created to protect small plots of cropland from the predation by marsupials. In the 1860s and 1870s, introduced rabbit populations began to spread rapidly across southern Australia.

By 1884, a rabbit-proof fence was built. Having been unsuccessful at keeping rabbits out, and more successful at keeping out pigs, kangaroos, emus and brumbies, and as more sheep farms were established, the interest for a dingo-proof barrier increased enough that government funds were being used to heighten and expand the fence. In 1930, an estimated 32,000 km of dog netting in Queensland alone was being used on top of rabbit fences.

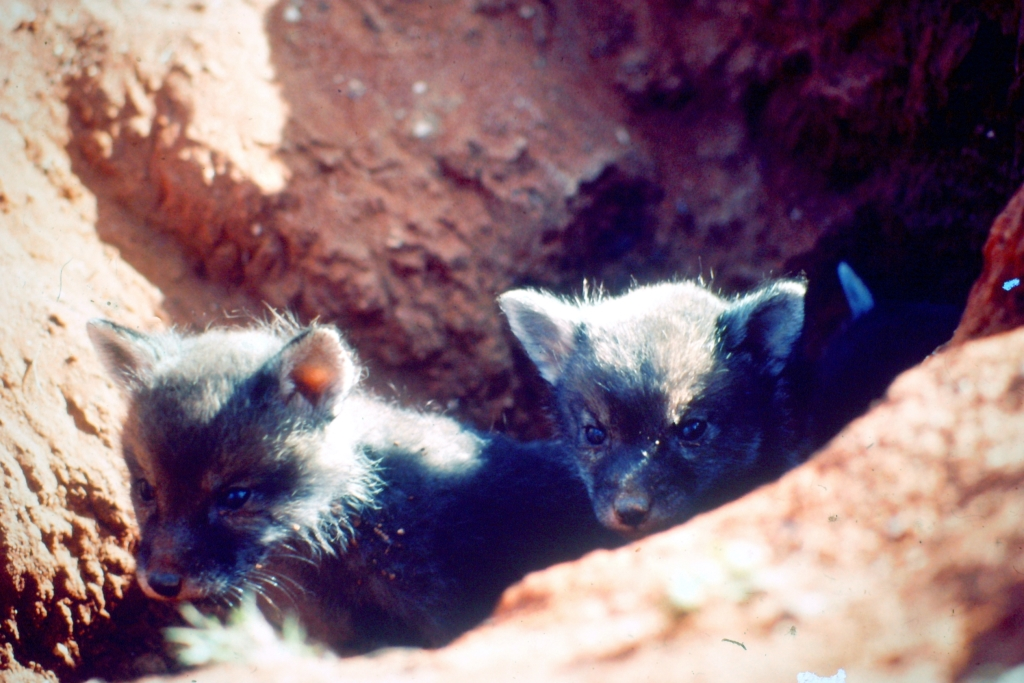
Dingo pups found just metres east of the Dingo Fence in 1976

Prior to 1948, the idea of a Dingo Barrier Fence Scheme had not come into fruition as a statewide project for which annual maintenance and repair were kept. Since this time, there have been pushes to move away from a method of barrier-exclusion to complete extinction of the dingo and wild-dog cross-breeds. Poisoning the species with compound 1080 (sodium monofluoroacetate) baits has been seen as a much cheaper alternative than fence maintenance. A compromise in the form of the continued use of poison and the shortening of the fence from its previous length of over 8000 km has been made.

Laws were appointed to protect the fence; jail terms of three months for leaving a crossing gate open, and six months for damage or removal of part of the fence – Introduced in 1946, these penalties are still in use today. In 2009 as part of the Q150 celebrations, the dingo fence was announced as one of the Q150 Icons of Queensland for its role as an iconic "innovation and invention".

In December 2023, construction began on a 32 km extension to the fence to close the gap between the New South Wales and South Australian border fences. The extension was completed in 2025. In June 2025, the New South Wales Government and the South Australian Dog Fence Board agreed that the Board would construct and maintain up to 290 km of additional fencing farther south along the state border. As of May 2026, construction was scheduled to begin early in the 2026–27 financial year.

Researchers have argued that extending the fence would be a "step backwards", because the fence was initially established so that landowners "could legally keep First Nations people off the land. It has a violent history and it hasn’t really been acknowledged in these terms", according to Dr Justine Philip, who has a PhD on dingoes at the University of New England. A spokesperson for South Australia's Primary Industries and Regions SA stated that approximately 20,000 sheep perished each year before gaps in the fence were sealed, and an expansion of the fence is essential.

== Geography ==
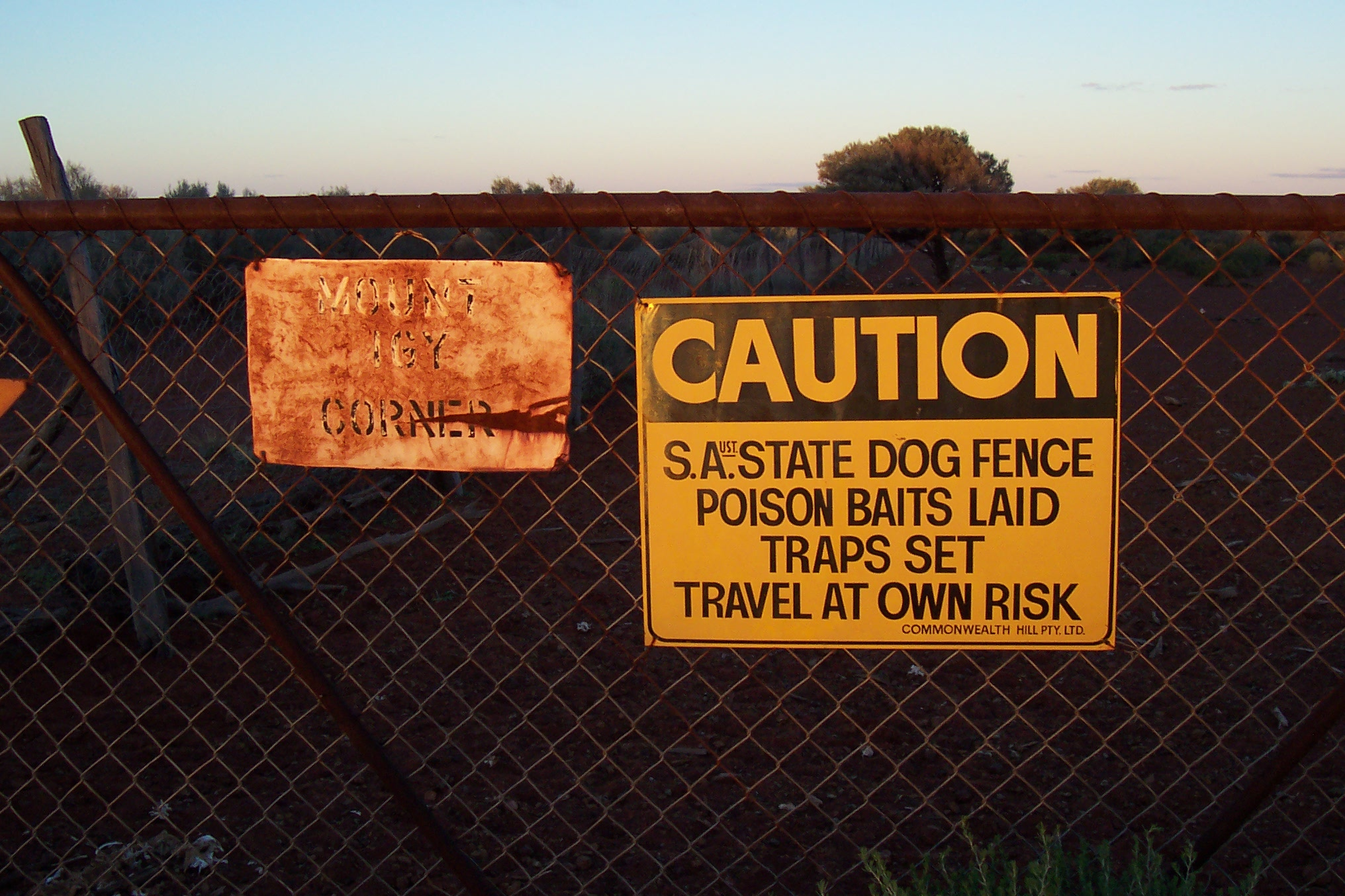
Dingo Fence at Igy Corner, SW of Coober Pedy

The 5,614km fence begins in South Australia, where it is named the dog fence, and it enters the NSW border near Broken Hill, where it becomes the state's responsibility and is called the wild dog fence. At Cameron Corner, it swerves north into Queensland and becomes the wild dog barrier fence. It travels the route commenced in the 1940s by the old dingo fence, which was used to drive out dingoes from grazing land to the west and agricultural country in Queensland's Darling Downs.

The 2,500 km (1,553 mi) section of the fence in Queensland is also known as the Great Barrier Fence or Wild Dog Barrier Fence 11. It is administered by the Department of Agriculture and Fisheries. The Wild Dog Barrier Fence staff consists of 23 employees, including two-person teams that patrol a 300 km (186 mi) section of the fence twice every week. There are depots at Quilpie and Roma.

The Queensland Border Fence stretches for 394 km (245 mi) westwards along the border with New South Wales, into the Strzelecki Desert. The fence passes the point where the three states of Queensland, New South Wales and South Australia meet (Cameron Corner). At this point, it connects with the South Australian Border Fence, which runs for 257 km (160 mi) southwards along the border with New South Wales, these two sections are managed by the New South Wales Wild Dog Destruction Board. It then joins a section known as the Dog Fence in South Australia, which is 2,225 km (1,383 mi) long.

== Physical design ==
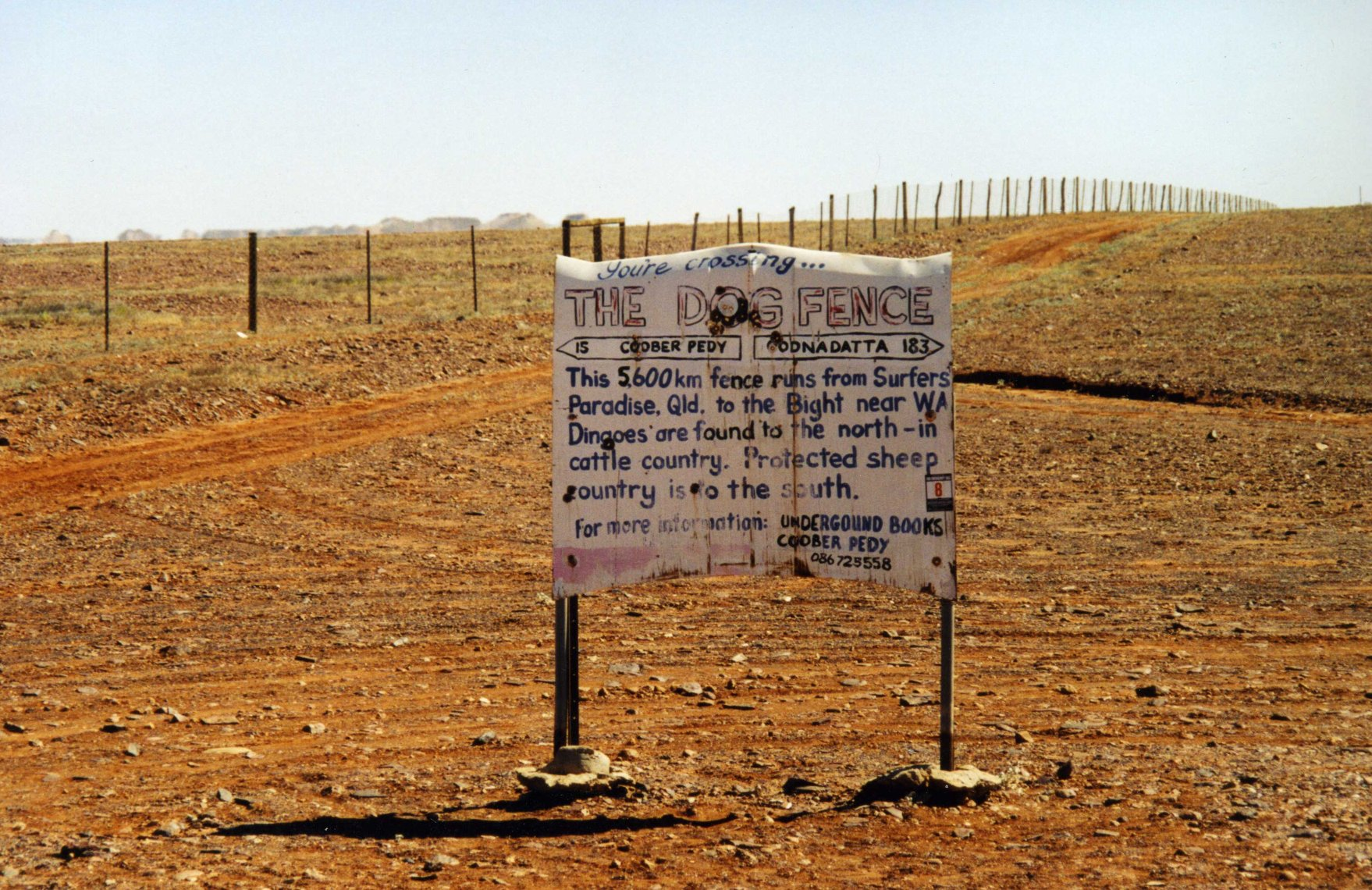
A portion of the dingo fence near Coober Pedy, South Australia

The fence varies in construction. Mostly it is made of 180-centimetre (6 ft) high wire mesh, but some sections in South Australia comprise multi-strand electric fence. The fence line on both sides is cleared to a 5 m (5.5 yd; 16 ft) width.

Parts of the Dingo Fence are lit at night by 86 mm (3.4 in) cold cathode fluorescent lamps which are alternately red and white. They are powered by long life batteries which are charged by photovoltaic cells during the day. At minor and farm crossings, a series of gates allow vehicles to pass through the fence. Where the fence intersects major roads and highways, cattle grids are used to allow high-speed vehicles through.

Maintenance of the fence on the NSW side is managed by a team of 13 staff who manage portions of the fence between 60km and 100km, where they carry inspections every Monday and Friday. They are paid between $26 and $31 an hour with accommodation.

== Environmental impact ==
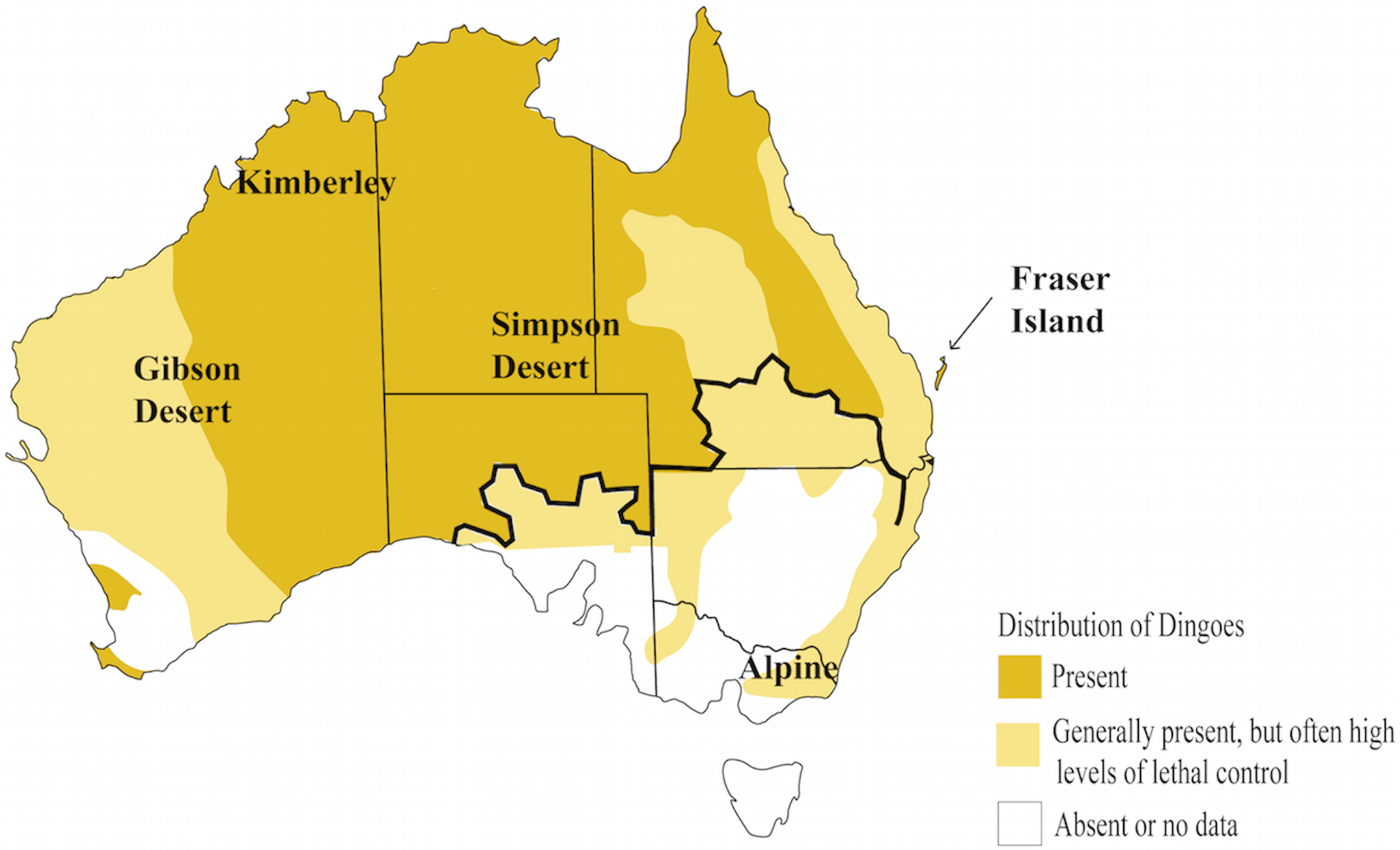
Distribution map of Australian dingoes. The black line represents the Dingo Fence (after Fleming et al. 2001).

It seems that there are fewer kangaroos and emus on the northwestern side of the fence where the dingoes are, suggesting that the dingoes' presence reduces the populations of those animals. Although the fence has been useful for protecting livestock against dingoes, ecologists opine that the fence is a colonial legacy that is more harmful than helpful.

Believed to have been introduced into Australia by Aboriginal peoples between 4,600 and 18,300 years ago, the dingo's status as a native or introduced species in Australia has been a controversy. According to Mike Letnic of the University of New South Wales, the dingo, as Australia's top predator, has an important role in maintaining the balance of nature. Where dingoes had been excluded by the fence, Letnic found reduced biodiversity, with fewer native mammals.

Although the fence has helped reduce the loss of sheep to predators, the exclusion of dingoes has allowed for increased pasture competition from rabbits, kangaroos and emus. In a 2024 report conferred to the lands minister, Steve Kamper, the board chair, Andrew Bell, stated that fewer than 10 wild dogs were reported outside the fence, with a full review of the NSW side of the fence accomplished and shown to be in "very good order". Furthermore, Department of Regional NSW spokesperson stated that the fence is "one of a range of tools used in the fight against wild dogs and other biosecurity threats", since it prevents the entry of many different animals, not just dingoes.

Dr Tom Newsome, a researcher at the University of Sydney’s global ecology lab, stated that by locking dingoes out, the fence may render unique perception into how they interact with the land. He says, “when you look at what happens when you remove an apex predator, there are some negative effects on the ecosystem...We have more herbivores, we have more invasive predators, localised extinctions, there's a negative story around that.”

Drone and satellite technology have illustrated how removing dingoes changes vegetation growth.

== Gallery ==
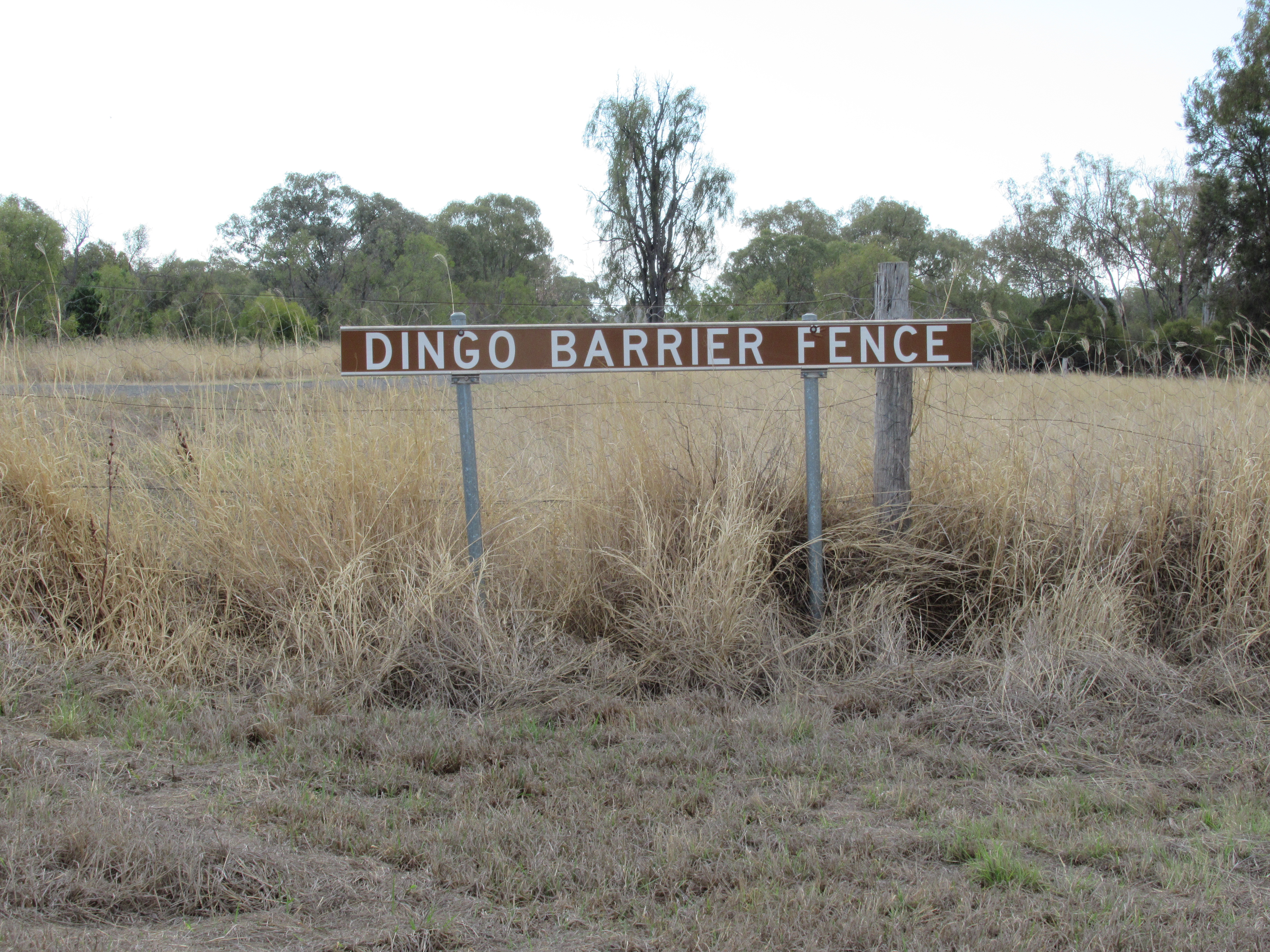
Dingo Barrier fence, near Bell, Queensland. 2018

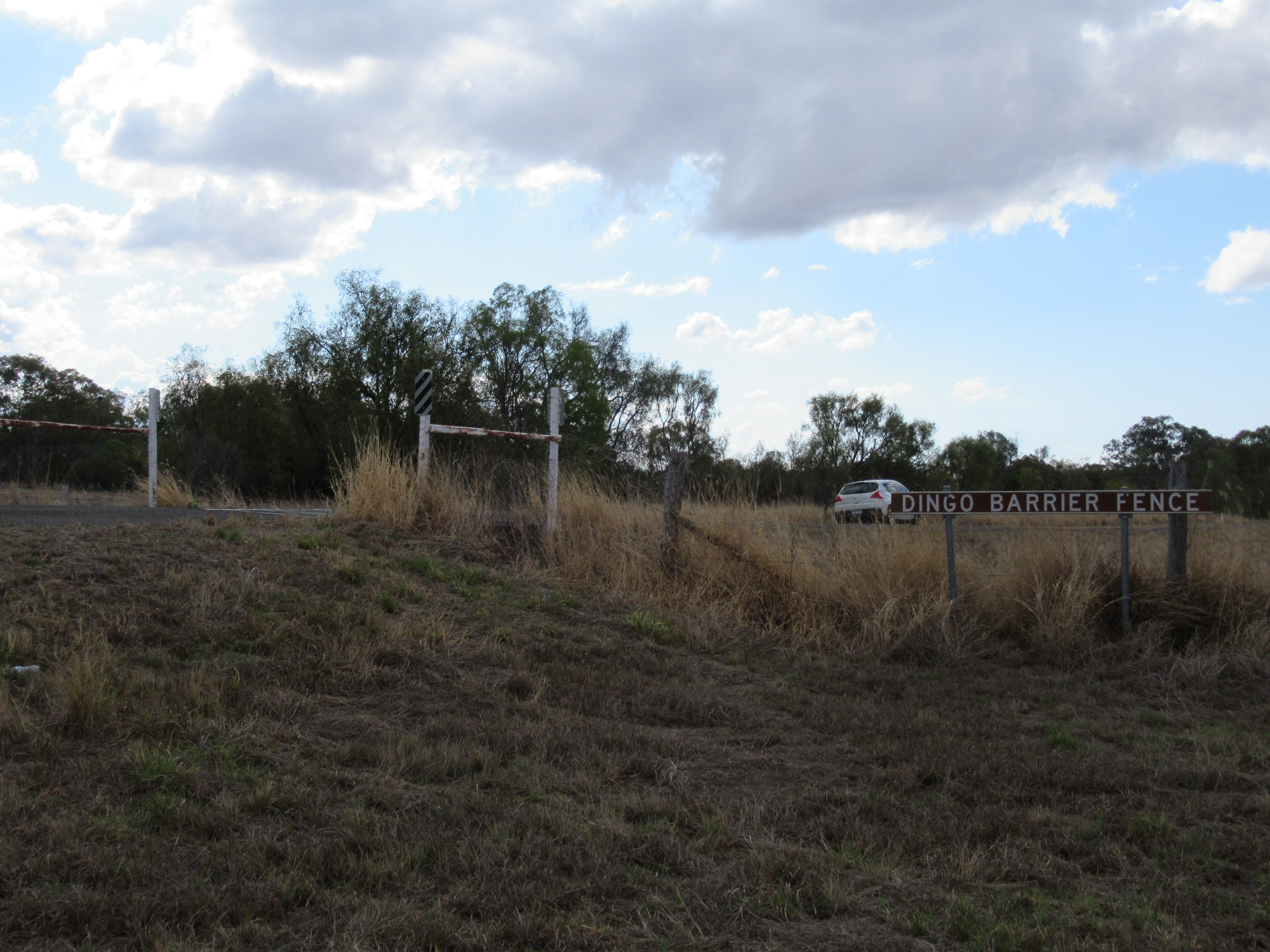
Dingo Barrier fence crossing, near Bell, Queensland. 2018

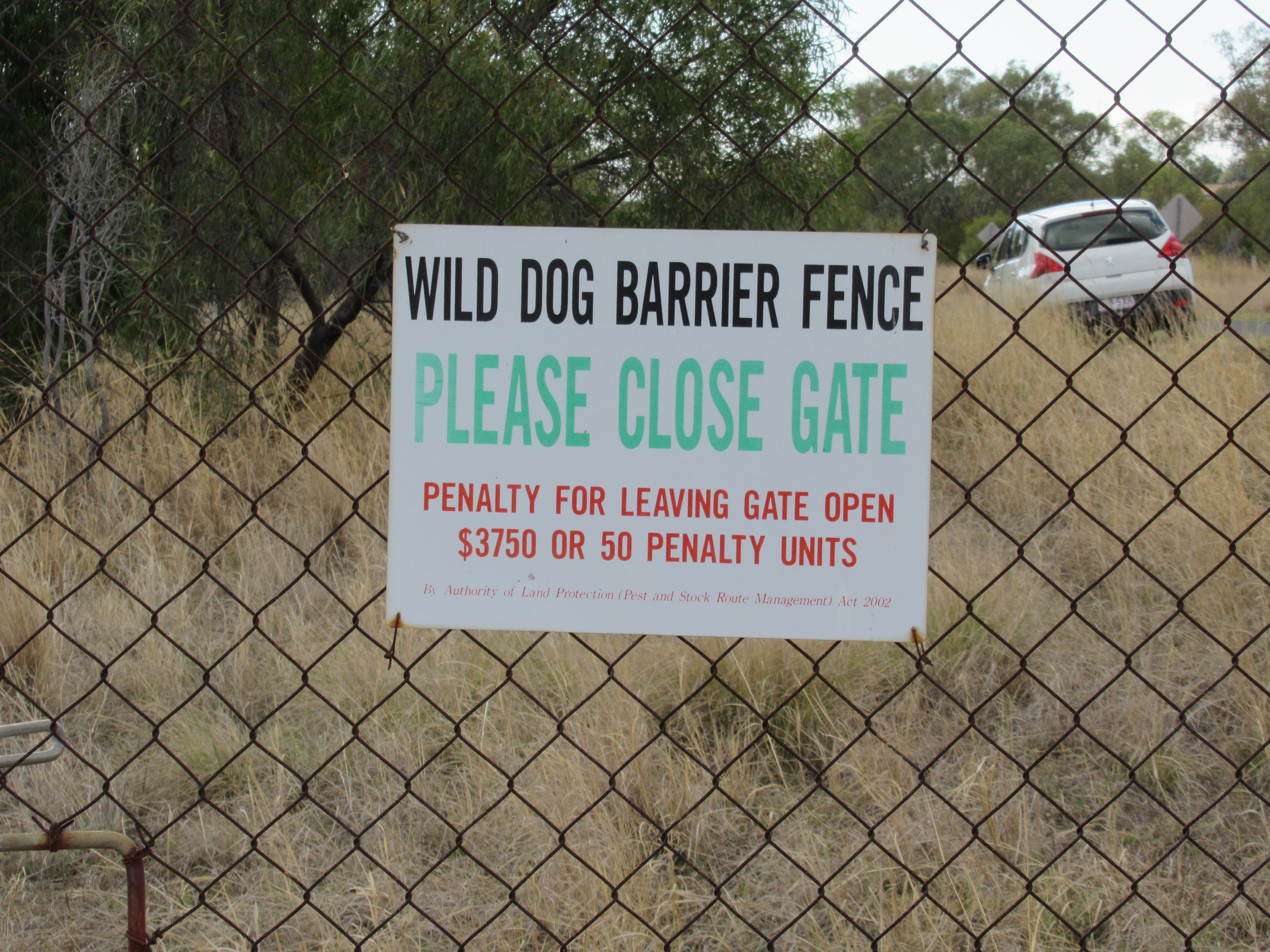
Dingo Barrier fence sign, near Bell, Queensland, Australia. Sign on gate for stock adjacent to cattle grid. 2018

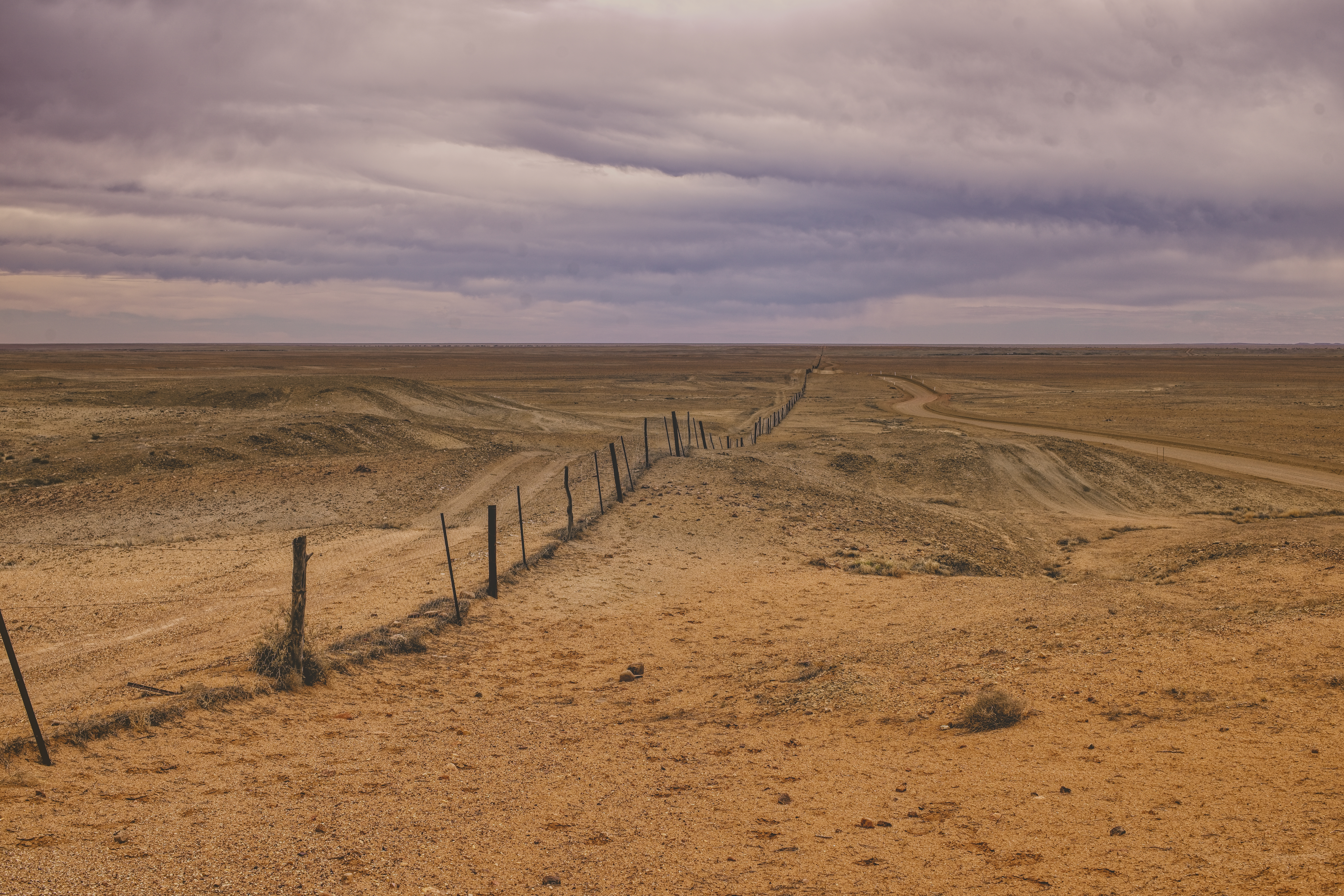
The fence near Coober Pedy, South Australia

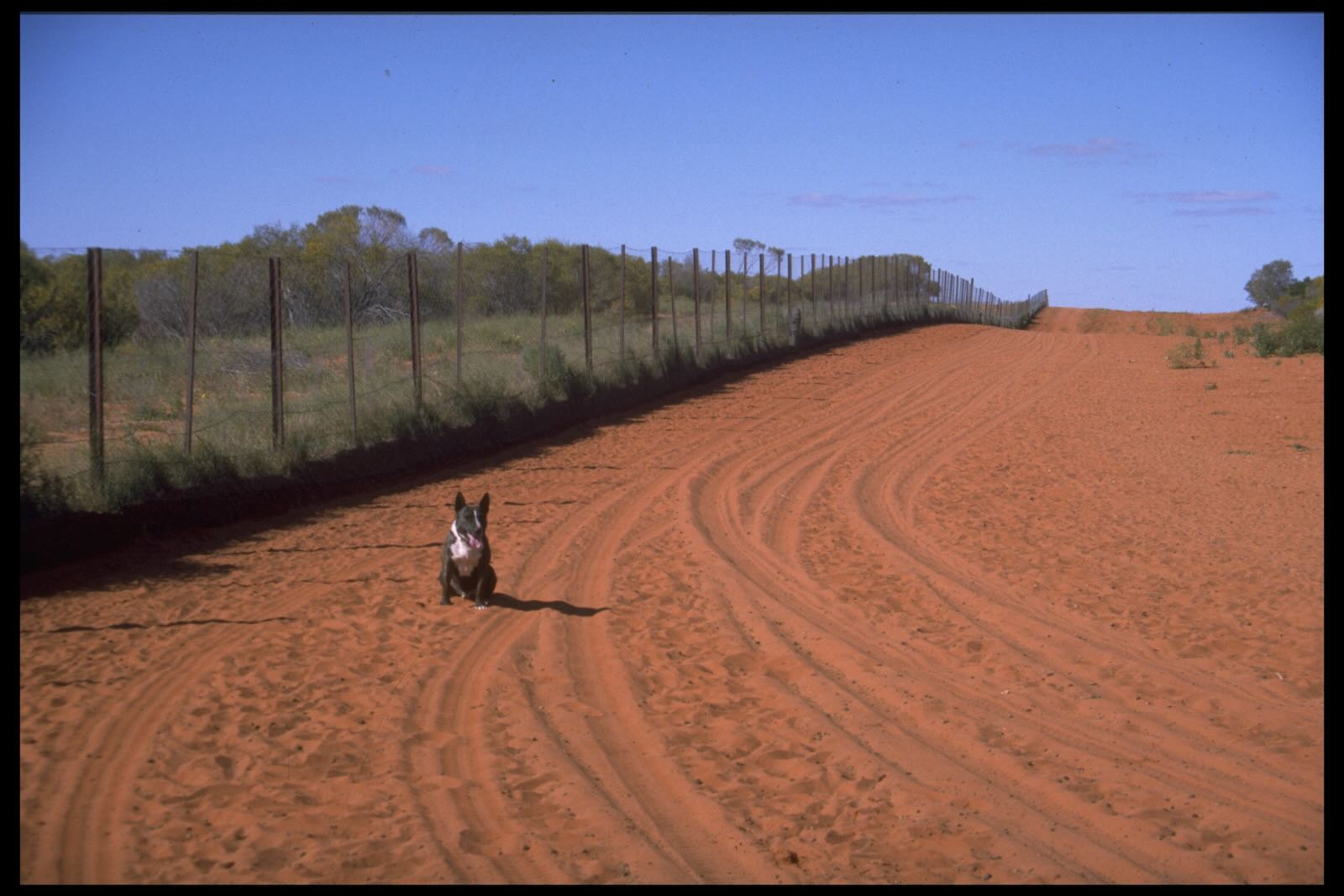
Hungerford, Queensland.

== See also ==
- Agricultural fencing
- Rabbit-proof fence
- Separation barrier
- Temporary fencing
