= List of Queensland's Q150 Icons =

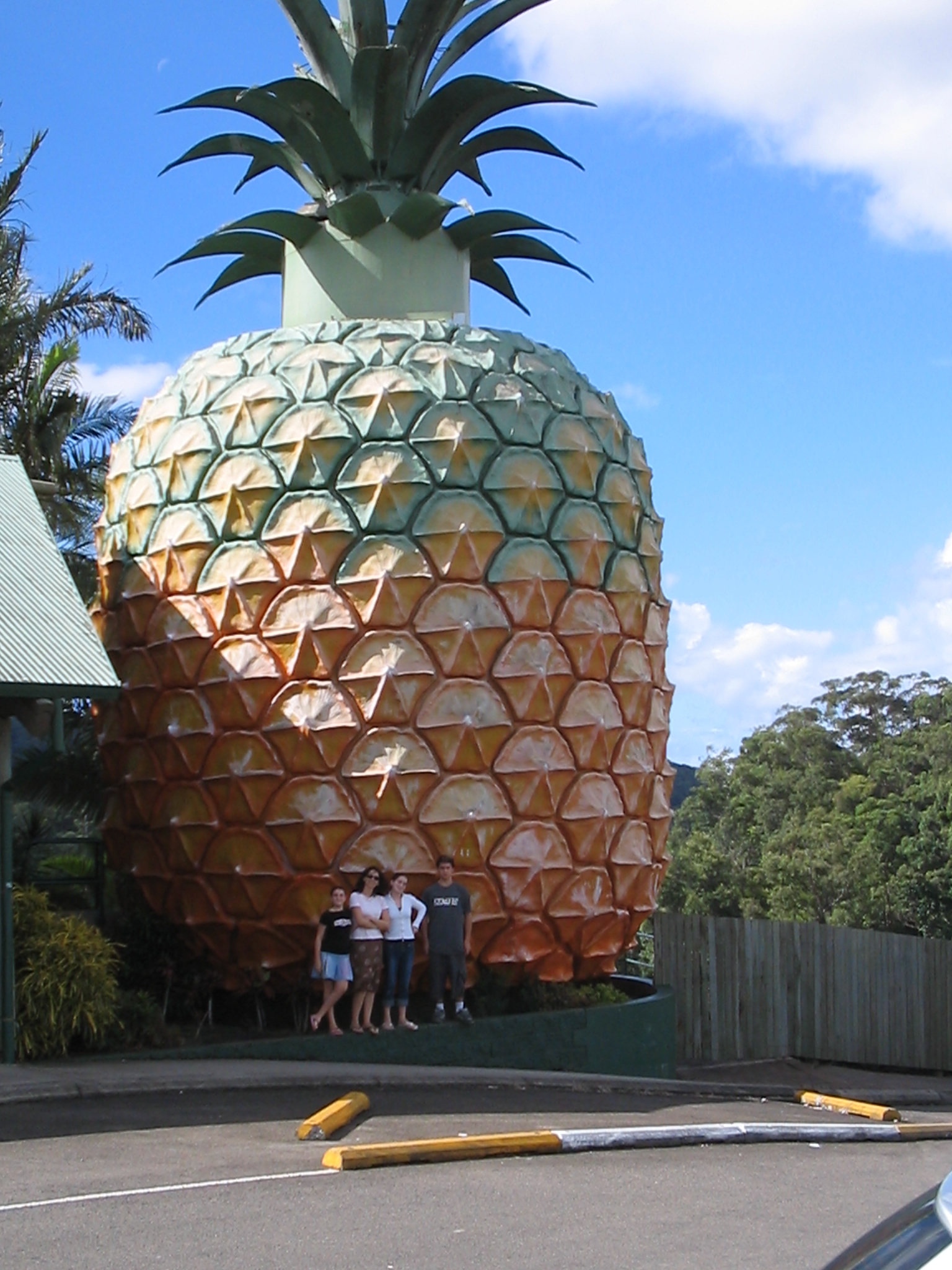
Big Pineapple, Nambour

The Queensland's Q150 Icons list of cultural icons was compiled as part of Q150 celebrations in 2009 by the Government of Queensland, Australia. It represented the people, places, objects and events that were significant to Queensland's first 150 years.

== History ==
A list of 300 nominations for Queensland cultural icons was compiled by the Queensland Government, organised into 10 categories, and then the Queensland public were invited to vote to produce a final list of 150 icons. The final list was announced on 10 June 2009 by the Queensland Premier Anna Bligh, as part of the Q150 celebration of Queensland's foundation.

== State shapers ==
This list is for people and organisations that are significant to Queensland.

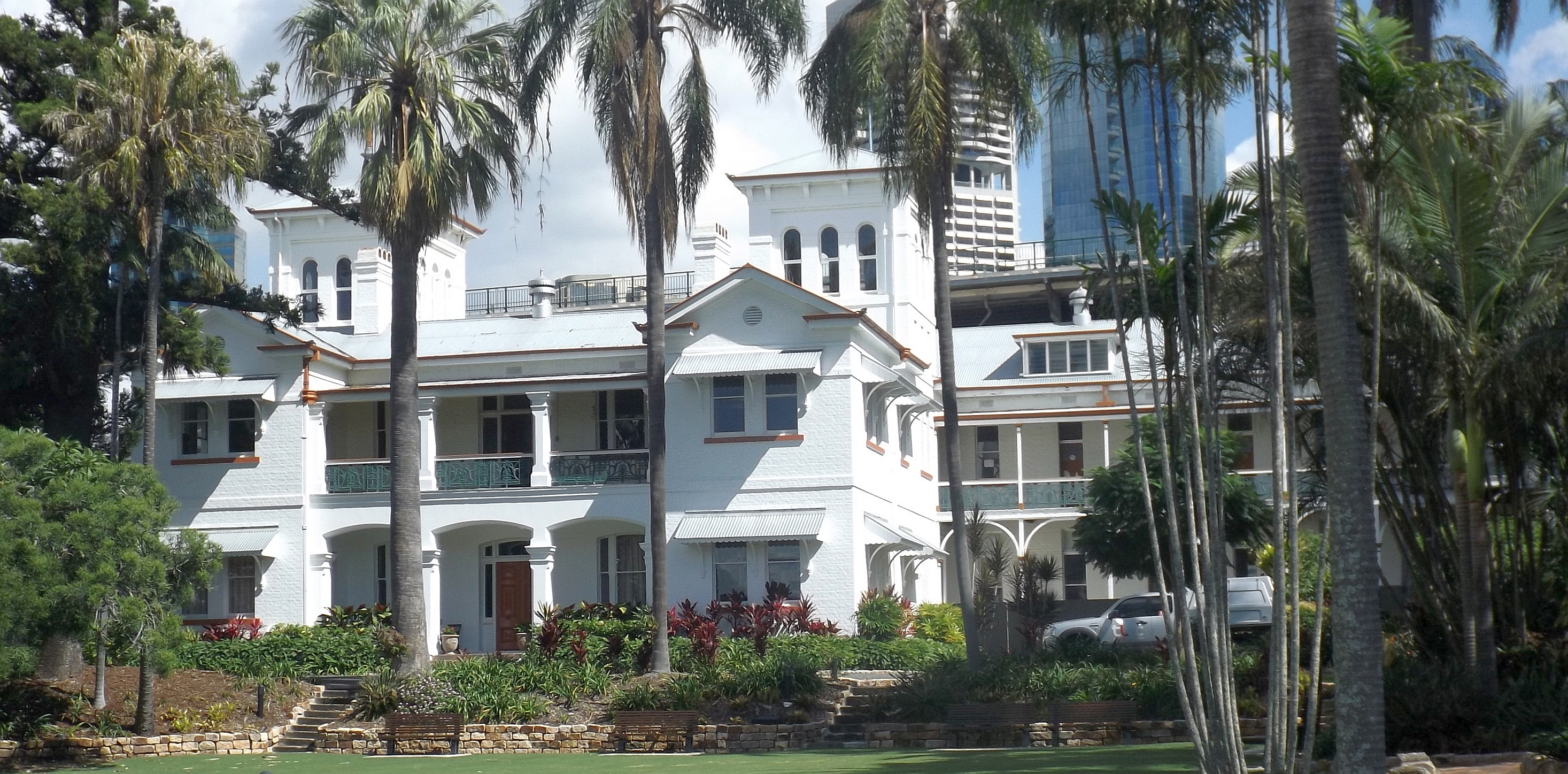
Yungaba Immigration Centre

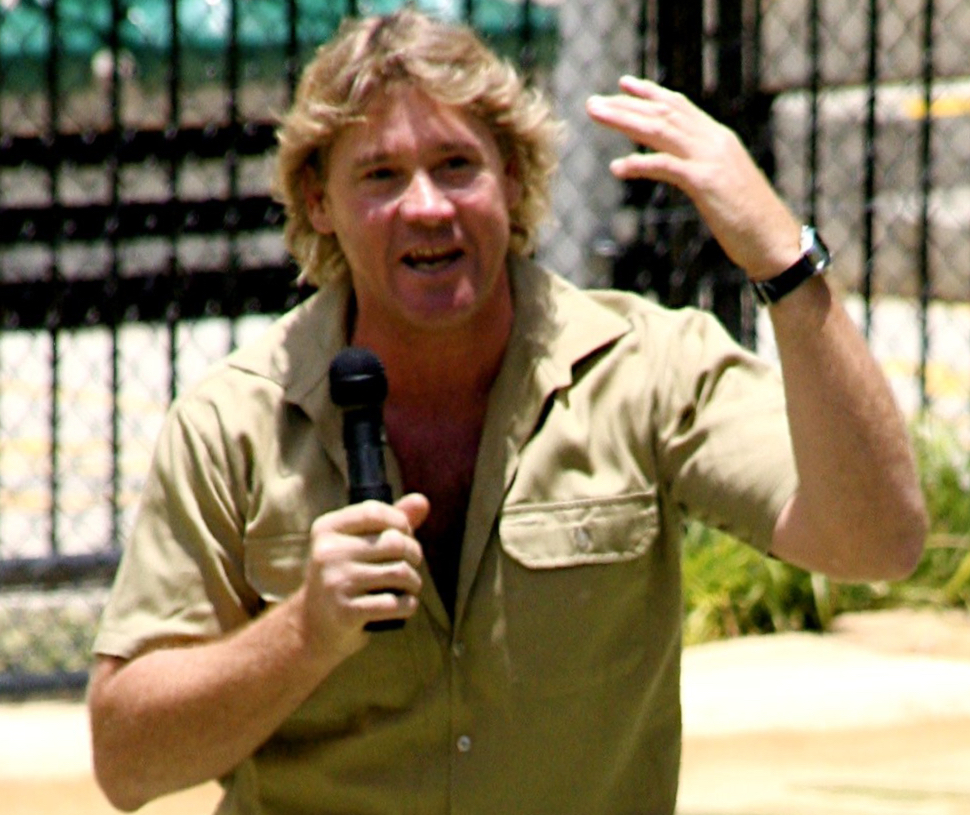
Steve Irwin

1	Yungaba Immigration Centre
2	Steve Irwin
3	Surf Lifesavers
4	Sir Joh Bjelke-Petersen
5	Leslie Thiess
6	Founders of Qantas
7	Clem Jones
8	Eddie Mabo
9	State Emergency Service
10	John Flynn
11	Charles Kingsford Smith
12	James Cook
13	Royal Agricultural Society of Queensland
14	Isolated Children's Parents Association
15	Wayne Bennett

== Influential artists ==
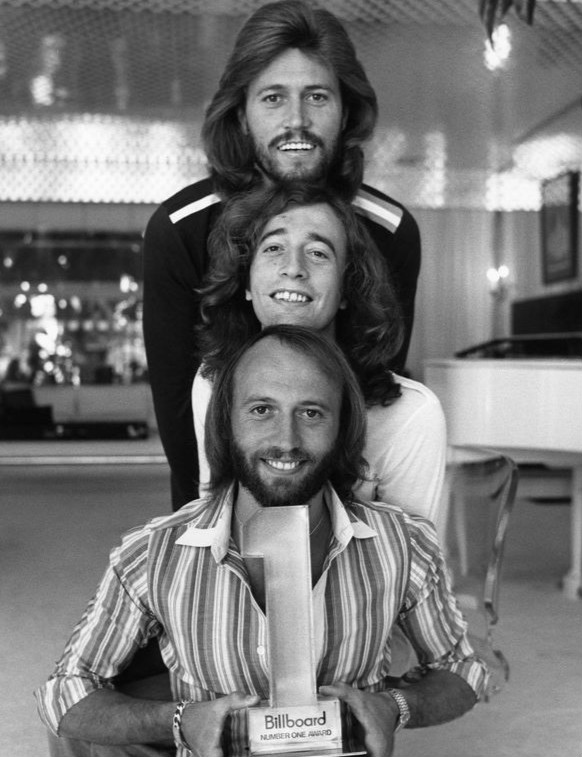
Bee Gees, 1977

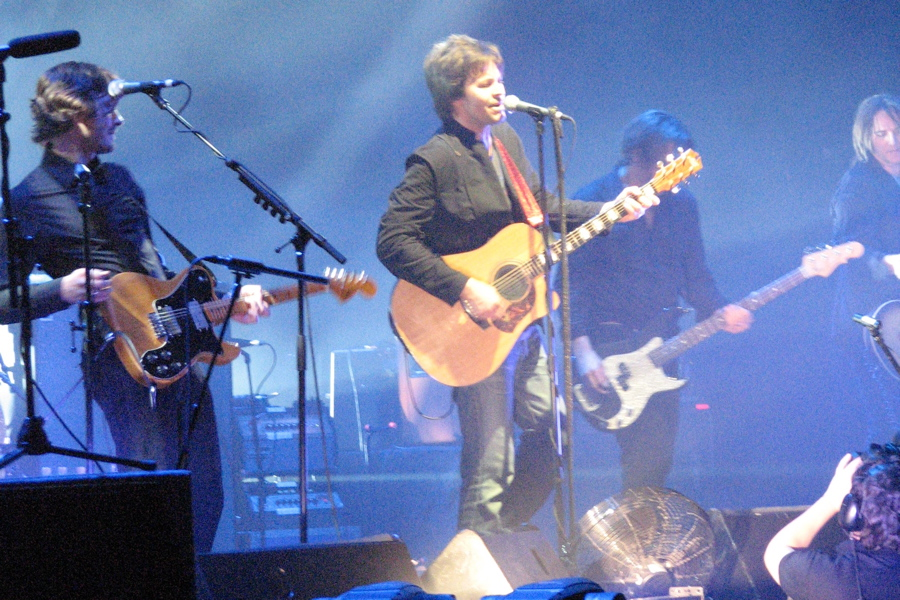
Powderfinger, 2007

1	Bee Gees
2	Powderfinger
3	Geoffrey Rush
4	Keith Urban
5	Oodgeroo Noonuccal (Kath Walker)
6	Steele Rudd
7	Judith Wright
8	Billy Thorpe
9	Hugh Lunn
10	Savage Garden
11	Gladys Moncrieff
12	Graeme Connors
13	William McInnes
14	David Malouf
15	Charles Chauvel

== Sports legends ==
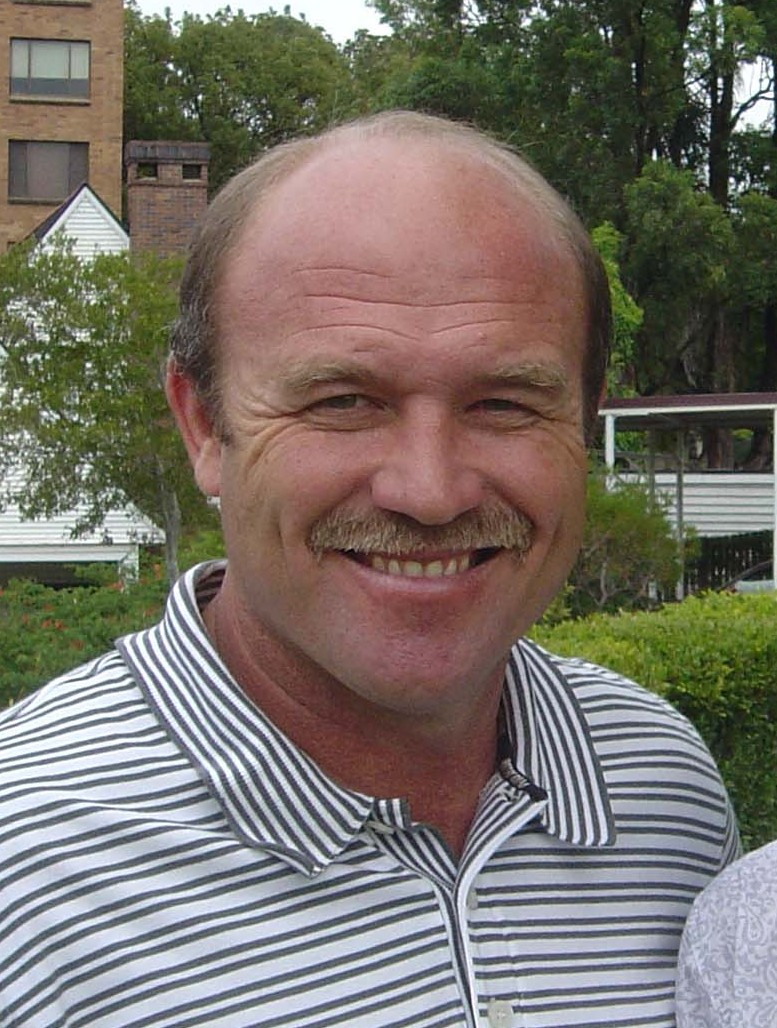
Wally Lewis

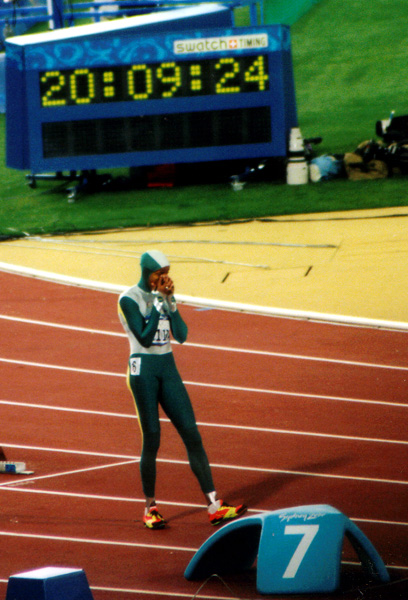
Cathy Freeman, 2000 Olympics

1	Wally Lewis
2	Cathy Freeman
3	Pat Rafter
4	Rod Laver
5	Allan Border
6	Greg Norman
7	Susie O'Neill
8	Dick Johnson
9	Allan Langer
10	Gunsynd
11	Mal Meninga
12	Grant Hackett
13	Matthew Hayden
14	Kieren Perkins
15	Mick Doohan

== Locations ==
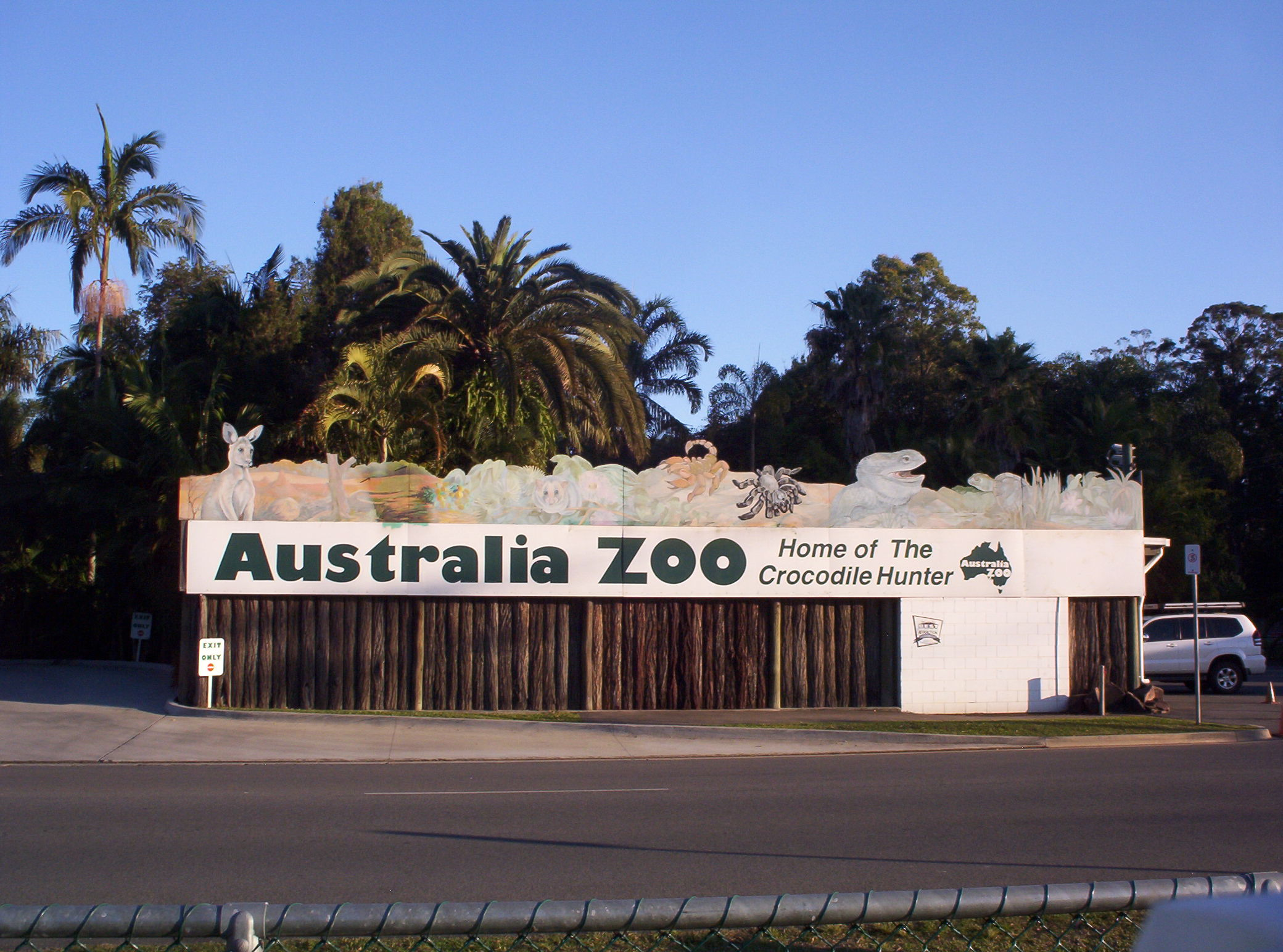
Australia Zoo

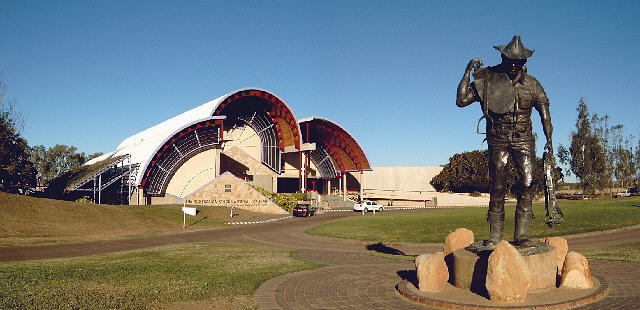
Stockman's Hall of Fame

1	Australia Zoo (Sunshine Coast Hinterland)
2	Australian Stockman's Hall of Fame (Longreach)
3	Surfers Paradise
4	Bundaberg Rum Distillery
5	Big Pineapple (Nambour)
6	South Bank Parklands (Brisbane)
7	Noosa
8	Breakfast Creek Hotel (Brisbane)
9	Yatala Pie Shop
10	Barcaldine Tree of Knowledge
11	Paronella Park (North Queensland)
12	Lone Pine Koala Sanctuary (Brisbane)
13	Currumbin Wildlife Sanctuary (Gold Coast)
14	Great Dividing Range
15	Darling Downs

== Natural attractions ==
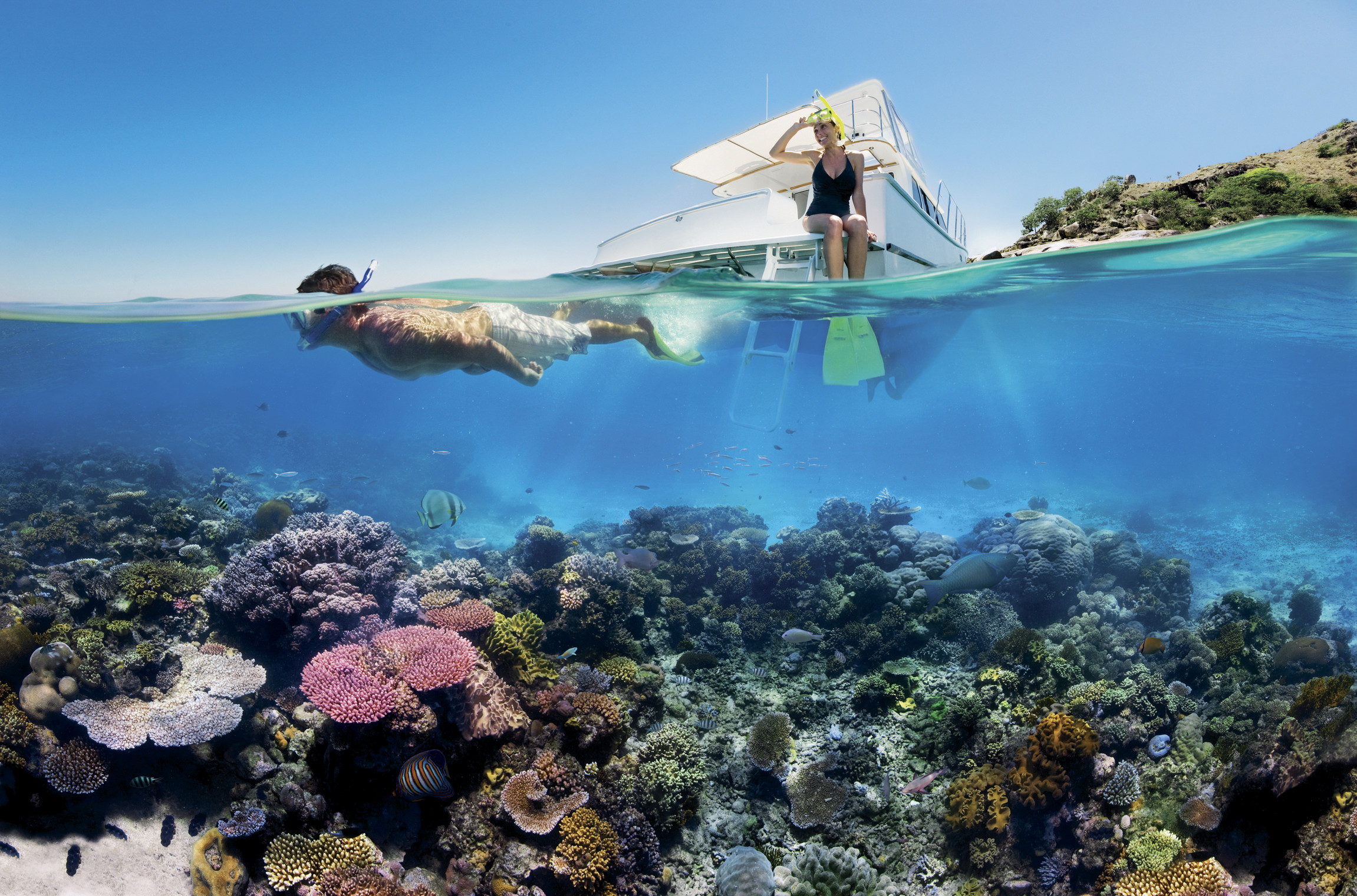
Great Barrier Reef

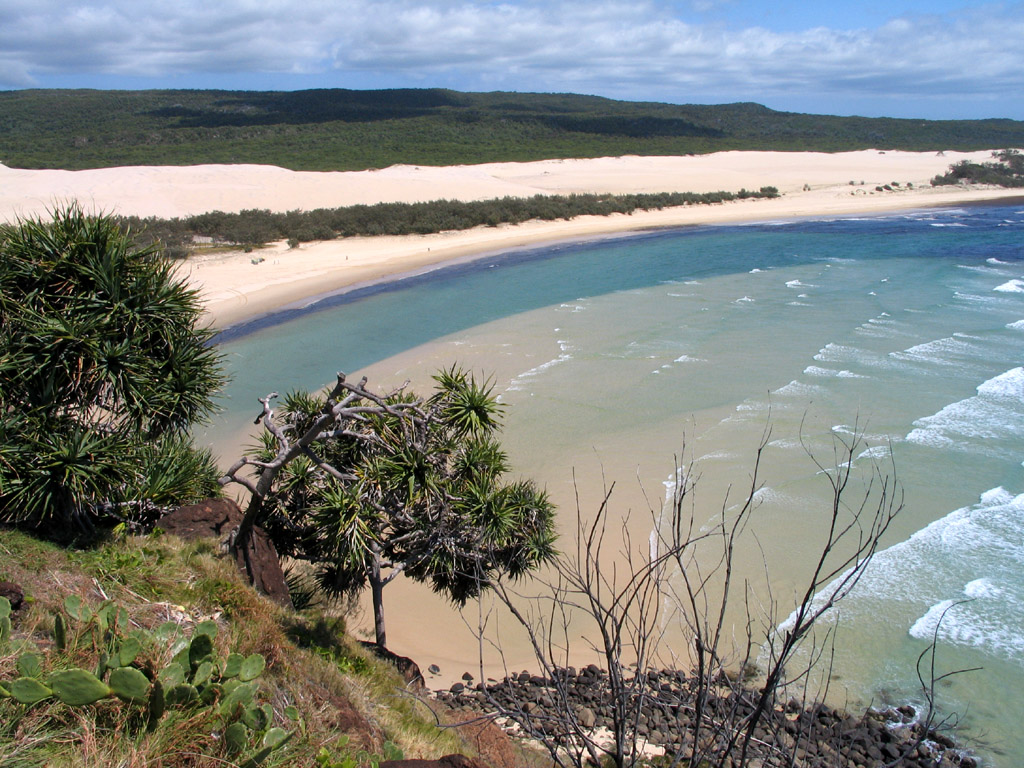
Fraser Island

1	Great Barrier Reef
2	K'gari
3	Glass House Mountains
4	Whitsundays
5	Daintree Rainforest
6	Outback Queensland
7	Carnarvon Gorge
8	Stradbroke Island
9	Lamington National Park
10	Bunya Mountains
11	Moreton Bay
12	Barron Falls
13	Springbrook National Park
14	Magnetic Island
15	Undara Lava Tubes

== Structures and engineering feats ==
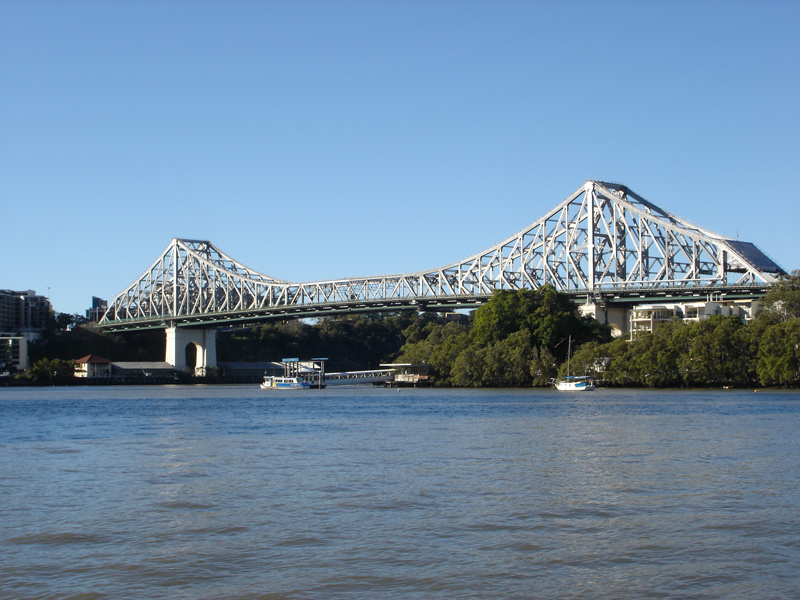
Story Bridge

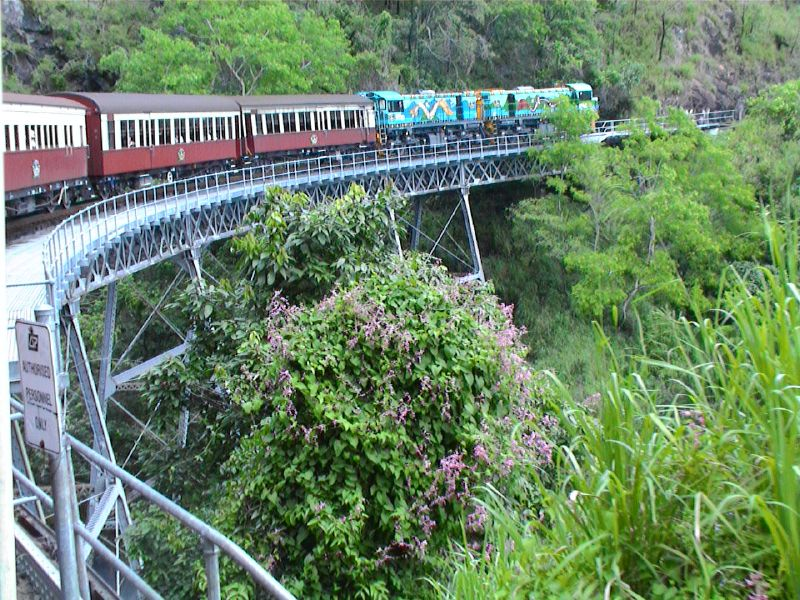
Kuranda Scenic Railway

1	Story Bridge (Brisbane)
2	Kuranda Scenic Railway (Cairns)
3	XXXX Brewery (Brisbane)
4	Brisbane City Hall
5	Skyrail Rainforest Cableway (Cairns)
6	Gateway Bridge (Brisbane)
7	Lang Park (Brisbane)
8	Q1 (Gold Coast)
9	The Gabba (Brisbane)
10	The University of Queensland Great Court
11	St John's Cathedral (Brisbane)
12	Old Museum (Brisbane)
13	Qantas Hangars (Longreach and Cloncurry)
14	Hornibrook Bridge (Redcliffe)
15	Burdekin Falls Dam

== Defining moments ==
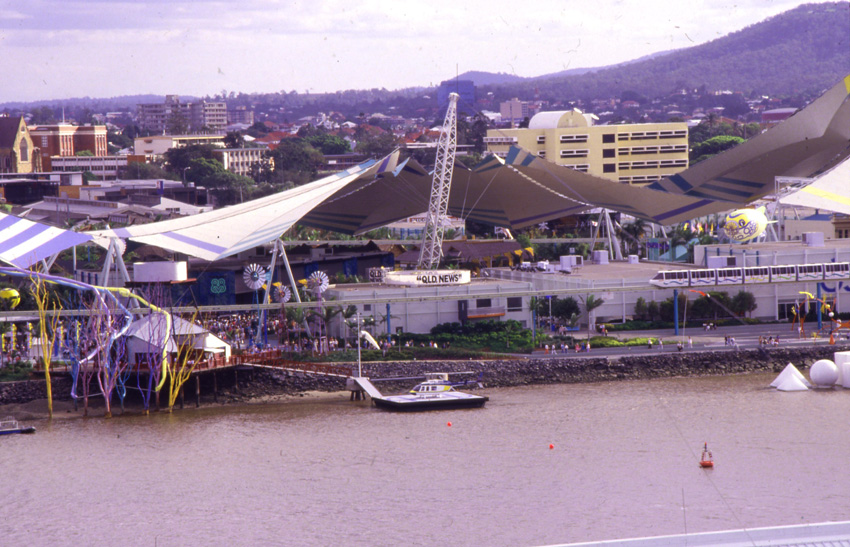
Expo '88

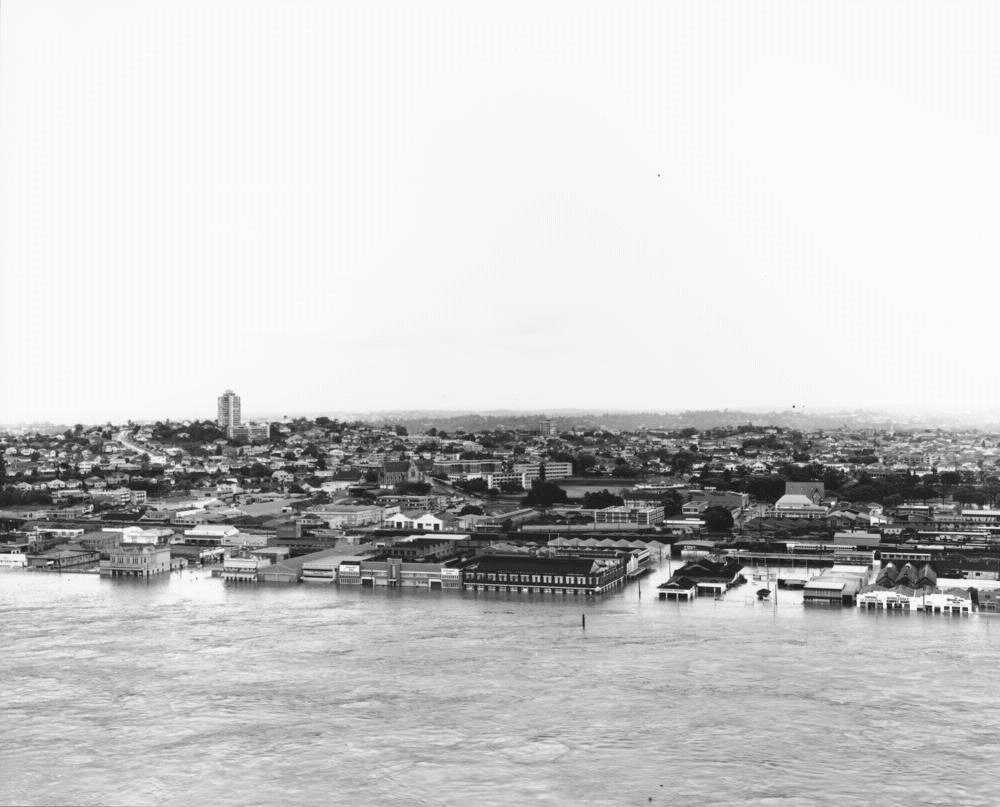
1974 Brisbane River flood

1	World Expo '88 (1988)
2	1974 Queensland floods
3	Qantas takes to the air (1920)
4	1982 Brisbane Commonwealth Games
5	Mabo High Court of Australia decision (1992)
6	Fitzgerald Inquiry (1987–89)
7	Queensland proclaimed as a new colony (1859)
8	Gold discovered in Queensland (1858)
9	World Heritage listing of the Wet Tropics (1988)
10	Queensland wins its first Sheffield Shield (1995)
11	Bellevue Hotel and Cloudland demolished (1979 and 1982)
12	Queensland the first with free education
13	Australia's first Aboriginal Parliamentarians: Neville Bonner (1971)
14	All chained up for women's rights (1965 at Regatta Hotel)
15	Railway comes to Queensland (1865)

== Innovations and inventions ==
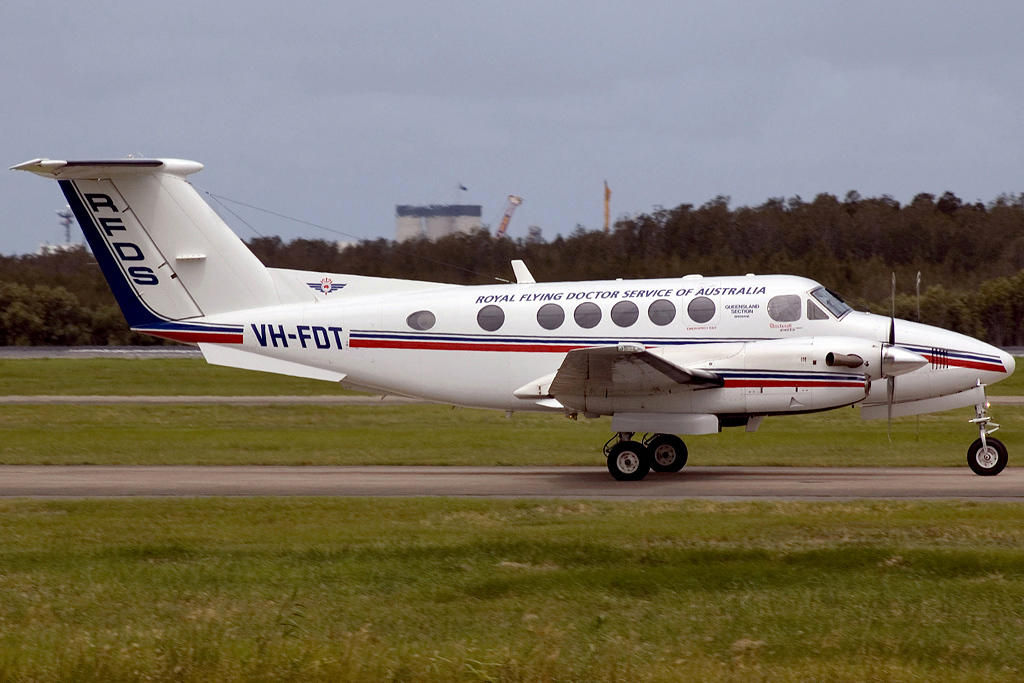
Royal Flying Doctor Service

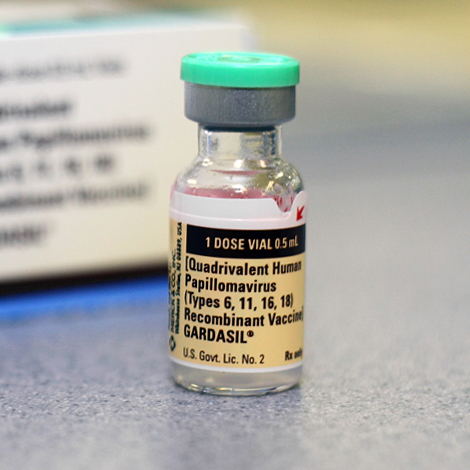
Cervical cancer vaccine

1	Royal Flying Doctor Service
2	Cervical cancer vaccination (Professor Ian Frazer)
3	Polio treatment
4	Blue Care (formerly Blue Nurses)
5	School of the Air
6	Billabong
7	Lamington
8	Kids Alive – Do the Five
9	Lucas' Pawpaw Ointment
10	Weis Fruit Bar
11	Immune system research wins Nobel Prize
12	Southern Cross windmills
13	Tilt train
14	Dingo fence
15	wotif.com.au

== Events and festivals ==
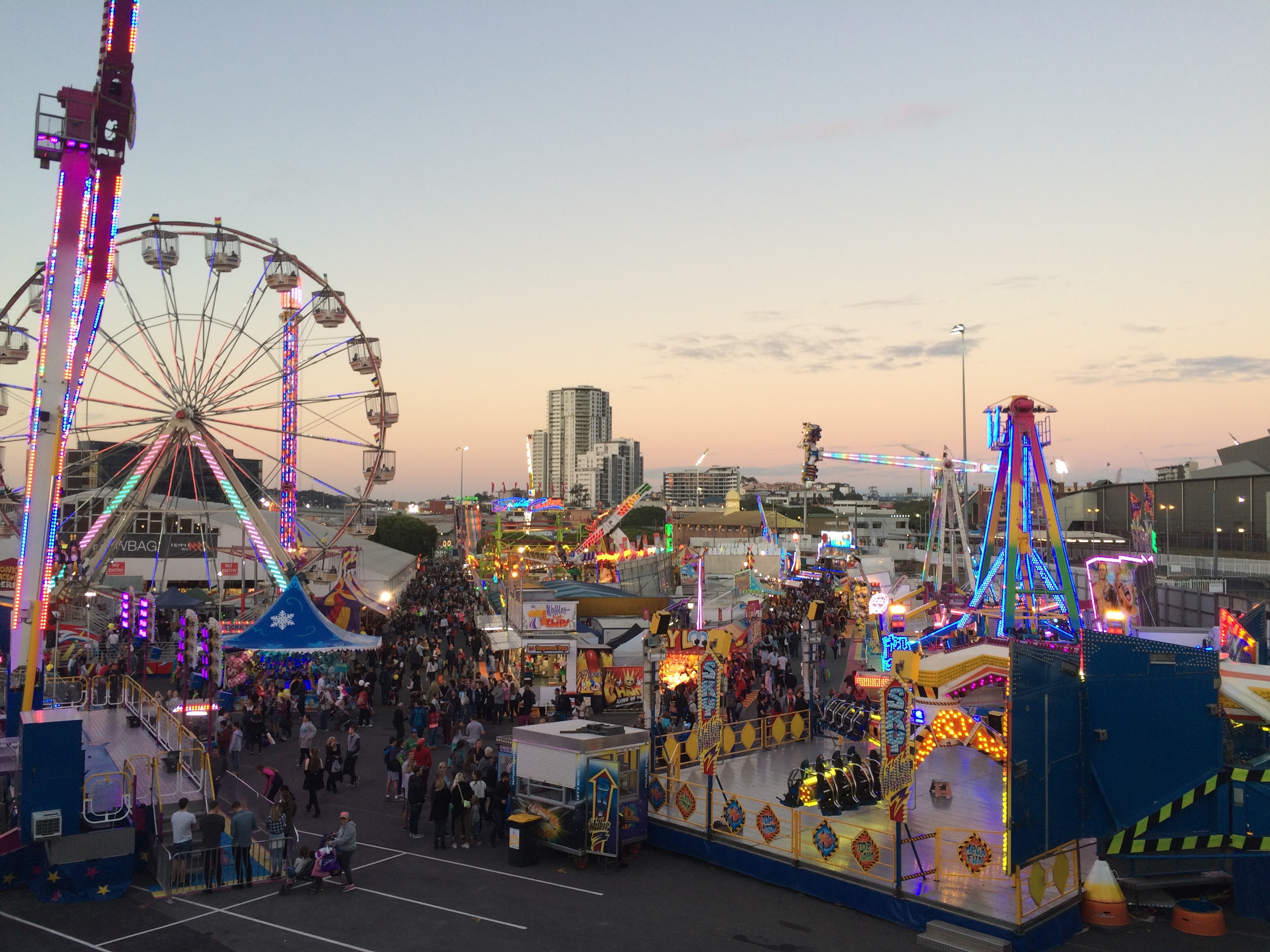
Ekka

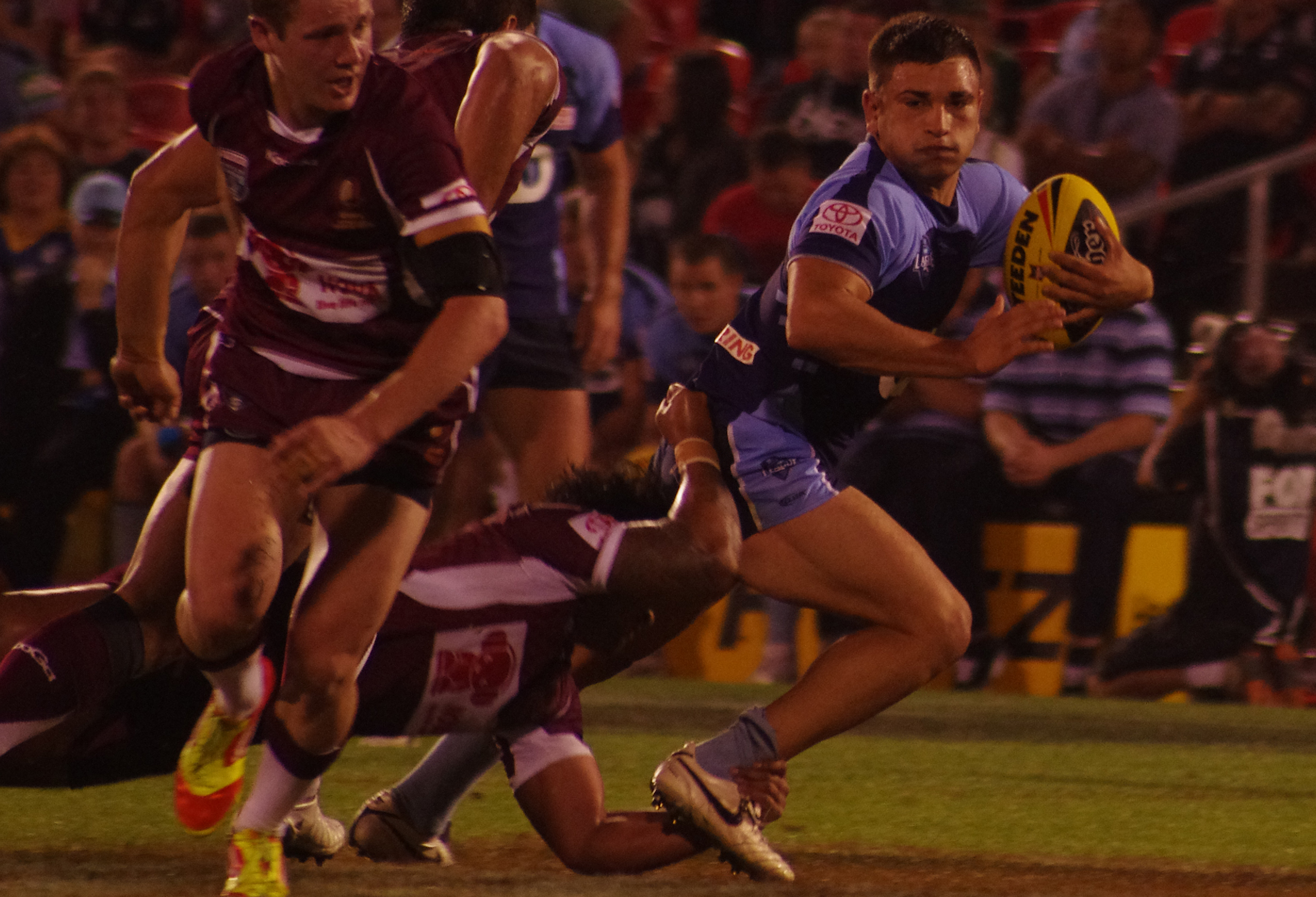
State of Origin

1	Ekka (Brisbane)
2	State of Origin series
3	Birdsville Races
4	RiverFire (Riverfestival)
5	Woodford Folk Festival
6	Carnival of Flowers (Toowoomba)
7	Country Music Muster (Gympie)
8	Indy (Gold Coast)
9	Apple and Grape Harvest Festival (Stanthorpe)
10	B&S Balls
11	Beef Australia (Rockhampton)
12	Brisbane to Gladstone yacht race
13	Mount Isa Rodeo
14	Paniyiri Greek Festival (Brisbane)
15	Noosa Triathlon

== Typically Queensland ==
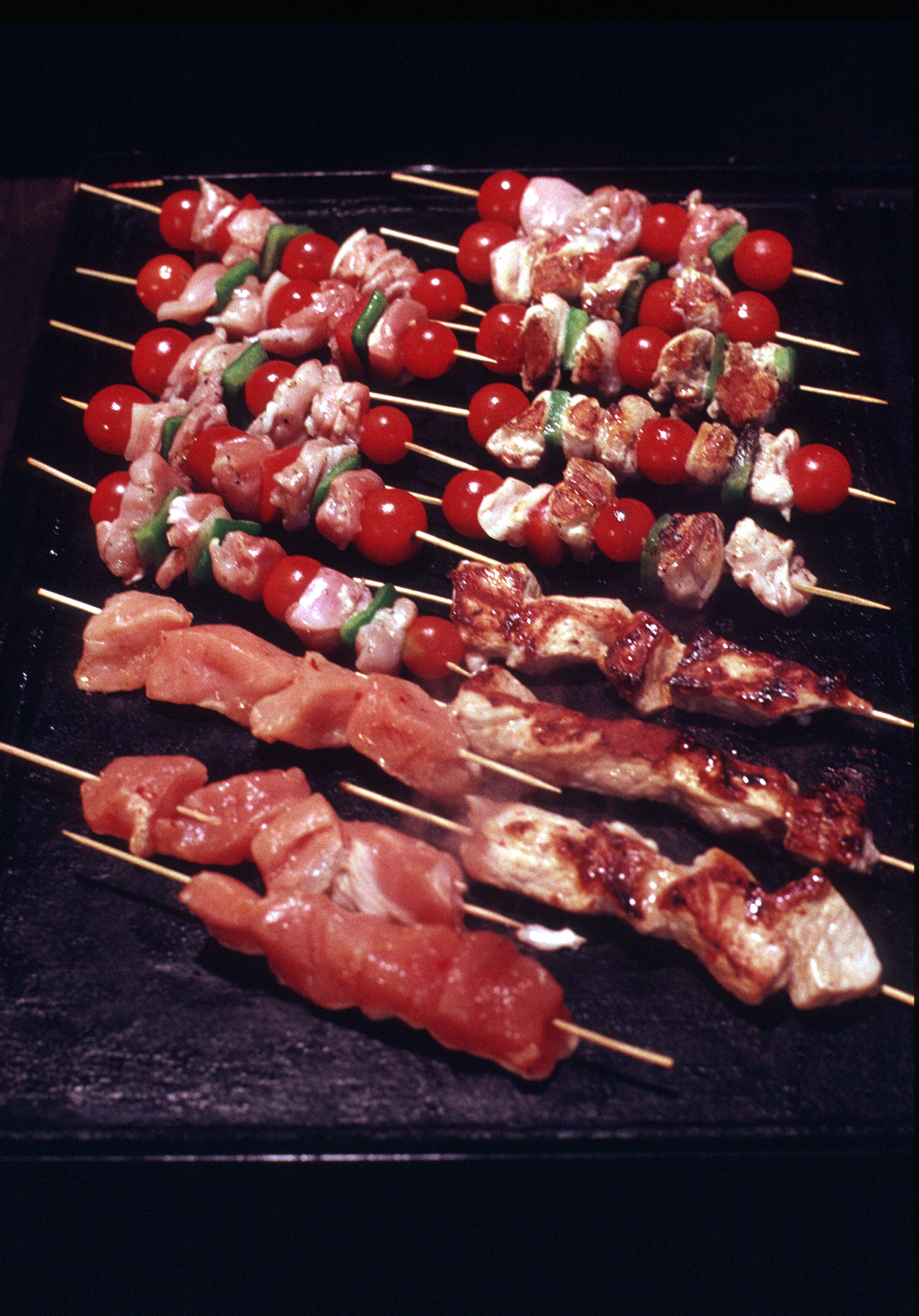
Barbeque

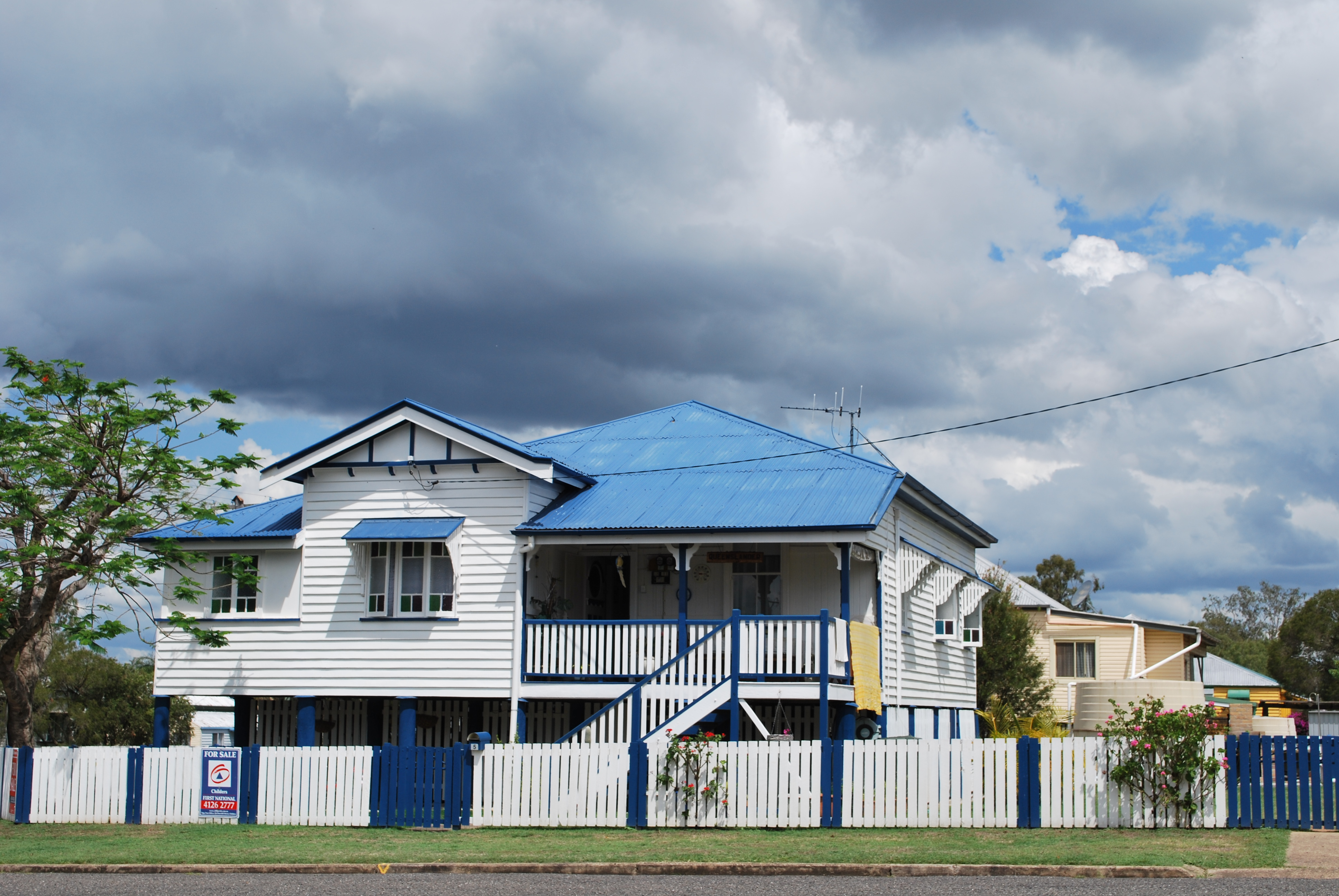
Queenslander House

1	Backyard BBQs
2	Queenslander house
3	XXXX beer
4	Bundy Rum (and bear)
5	Sunshine
6	Bowen mango
7	Summer afternoon storms
8	"Waltzing Matilda"
9	Macadamia nut
10	Maroon
11	Jacaranda tree
12	Cane fields
13	Cane toad
14	Thongs
15	Mud crab
