= Border Fence Maintenance Board =

Australian state government agency

Agency overview
- Formed: 1 January 1958; 67 years ago
- Preceding agency: Western Lands Commissioner
- Jurisdiction: New South Wales border
- Status: Current
- Headquarters: Broken Hill, New South Wales
- Employees: 12–14
- Minister responsible: Steve Kamper, Minister for Lands and Property
- Parent department: Department of Planning, Housing and Infrastructure

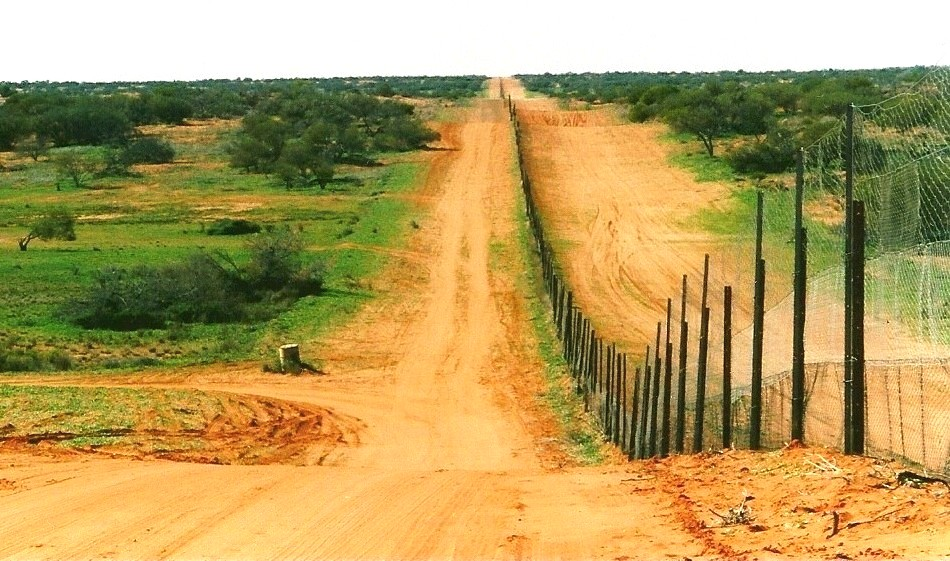
Dingo Fence on the 29th parallel south-Sturt National Park (right of fence) - looking east from Cameron Corner

The Border Fence Maintenance Board is an Australian agency of the Government of New South Wales, responsible for the management and maintenance of New South Wales' section of the Dingo Fence.

The Border Fence Maintenance Board manages the Dingo Fence that runs along the New South Wales–Queensland and the New South Wales–South Australia borders. The New South Wales section of the Dingo Fence was originally built in 1921 with the purpose of preventing sheep predation by dingoes in Western New South Wales, it is estimated that without it sheep grazing would be uneconomical in the state west of Dubbo. Originally managed from Sydney, the management of the fence from the 1920s to the 1940s was considered ineffective, exacerbated by floods, droughts, inadequate funding and shortages of materials during the Second World War. The Wild Dog Destruction Board was founded in 1957 to rectify the management issues, and is headquartered in Broken Hill, a move that improved the organisation's responsiveness compared to its managerial predecessor based in far away Sydney.

The New South Wales section of the Dingo Fence runs 606 kilometres (377 mi), starting at Hungerford on the Queensland border and ends near Broken Hill on the South Australian border. The Wild Dog Destruction Board is staffed by 12–14 'doggers' who check the entire fence line twice a week, these staff being based in some of the most isolated regions of New South Wales.

The agency was created as Wild Dog Destruction Board with the passing of the Wild Dog Destruction (Amendment) Act 1957.

In 2017, to better reflect its purpose, the Biosecurity Act 2015 renamed the Wild Dog Destruction Act 1921 as the Border Fence Maintenance Act 1927. The Board was consequently renamed the Border Fence Maintenance Board.
