= Longreach Airport =

Airport in Queensland, Australia

- IATA: LRE; ICAO: YLRE

Summary
- Airport type: Public
- Operator: Longreach Shire Council
- Location: Longreach, Queensland
- Elevation AMSL: 627 ft (191 m)
- Coordinates: 23°25′53″S 144°16′41″E

Map
- Location in Queensland

Runways
Direction	Length		Surface
Direction	m	ft	Surface
04/22	1,936	6,352	Asphalt
- Sources: Australian AIP and aerodrome chart

Longreach Airport (IATA: LRE, ICAO: YLRE) is situated in Longreach, Queensland, Australia. The airport is 1.5 nautical miles (2.8 km; 1.7 mi) northeast of the city.

The Royal Flying Doctor Service has one of its nine Queensland bases at Longreach Airport.

== History ==
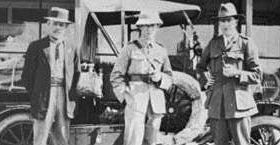
Fysh, McGinness and Gorham in Longreach, Australia, at the start of the survey in preparation of the Great Race from England to Sydney. 1919

Longreach has played a major part in Australian aviation from 1919 onwards. In August of that year, a small party left the town to travel overland to survey a route suitable for competitors in the first air race to leave England en route to Australia. The travellers included Hudson Fysh and Paul McGinness, two pilots who had both been trained in the Australian Flying Corps during World War I. In December 1919, a Vickers Vimy landed, piloted by Ross and Keith Smith, who were en route to Melbourne after completing the first England to Australia flight. They were the first to use the air route pioneered by Fysh and McGinness.

The first overland flight across the Australian continent from Melbourne to Darwin passed through the airport in 1919. This flight was undertaken by Captain Henry Wrigley and Sergeant Arthur Murphy, flying a B.E.2.

In 1920, the first single engine aircraft to complete the flight from England to Australia arrived. The aircraft was an Airco DH.9, piloted by Ray Parer and John McIntosh.

In late 1920, the Queensland and Northern Territory Aerial Service was founded. Although founded in Winton, the first operational base for the airline, later to be known as QANTAS, was Longreach. Principal among the pioneers of the airline were Hudson Fysh and Paul McGinness, who had seen the opportunities aviation had presented to remote Australia during their survey the previous year. One of the original Qantas hangars survives at the airport to this day.

Charles Kingsford Smith arrived in 1927, during a flight around the continent. His aircraft on this occasion was a Bristol Tourer.

Amy Johnson landed her de Havilland Gipsy Moth, registered G-AAAH, at the airport in 1930. She was the guest of honour at a dinner hosted by Shell at the Imperial Hotel in Longreach. Johnson had just completed the first flight by a woman from England to Australia, and was continuing to the east coast.

In 1941, the Department of Civil Aviation established the Longreach Aeradio station at the airport. This unit enabled air ground communication with the increasing number of radio equipped aircraft operating throughout the country.

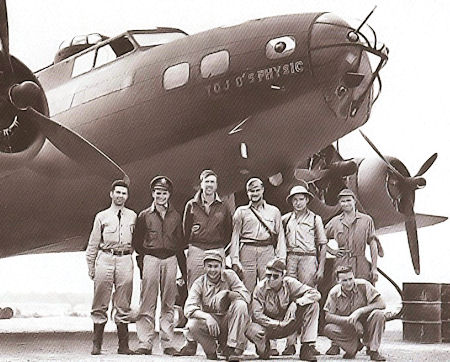
Crew of Boeing B-17E Fortress 41-2034 (Tojo's Physic) of the USAAF 19th Bomb Group, 93d Bomb Squadron, stationed at Longreach, June 1942

During World War II, Longreach airport became, for a short time in 1942, a base for United States Army Air Forces B-17 bomber aircraft of the 28th and 93d Bombardment Squadrons (Heavy). The airport was upgraded to cater for the additional weight of these aircraft. In May, these aircraft were flown from the town to engage the enemy in the Battle of the Coral Sea. Used shell casings from the guns of these aircraft can still be found adjacent to the runways. By this stage, the airport had three operational runways.

The Flight Service console, now located in a town museum

At one time in the 1960s, Longreach airport was one of the busiest inland airports in Australia. However, with drought and the general downturn of the rural economy throughout the country, air traffic declined.

In 1990, the Department of Aviation closed the Longreach Flight Service Unit, the descendant of the Aeradio station opened in 1941. The airport was transferred to the ownership of the Longreach Shire Council shortly thereafter.

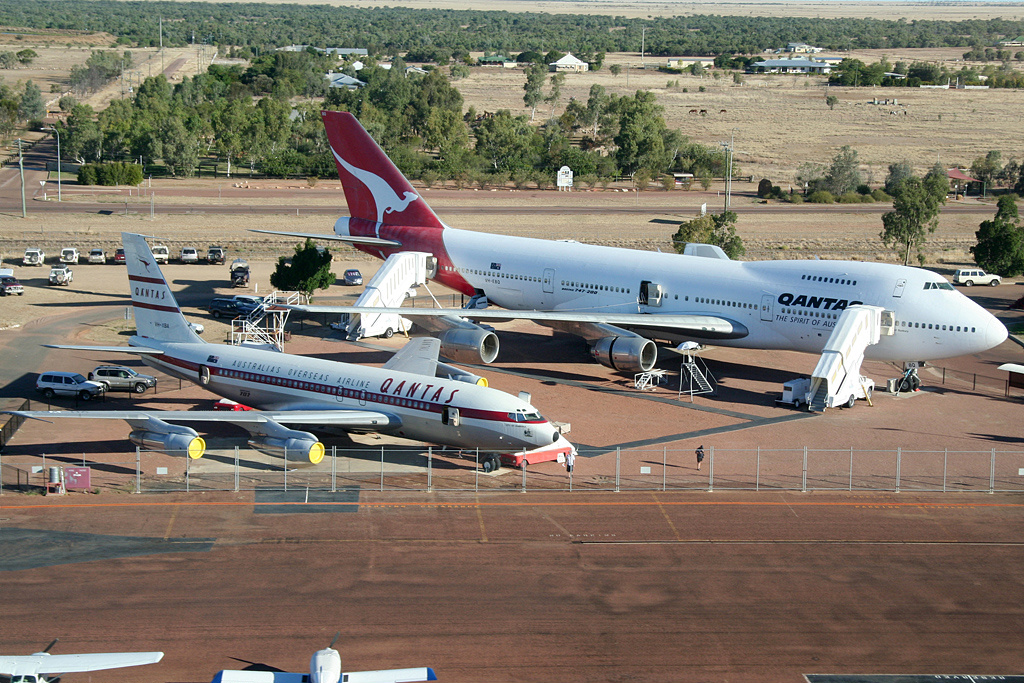
Qantas Boeing 707 and Boeing 747-200 at the Qantas Founders Museum

In 2002, Qantas returned to the town, with a Boeing 747-238B aircraft, registered VH-EBQ and named City of Bunbury, flown into the town for static display at the Qantas Founders Museum, which is also sited at the airport. This was the last 747-200 delivered to Qantas and is sitting with the first Boeing 707 for Qantas VH-EBA.

In 2012, a new terminal was opened to comply with new security regulations. The new terminal features security screening facilities, and improved check in and arrival facilities, as well as increased parking facilities.

== Airlines and destinations ==
QantasLink flies between Longreach and Brisbane. Rex Airlines connects Longreach to Townsville and Winton.

== See also ==
- Transport in Australia
- United States Army Air Forces in Australia (World War II)
- List of airports in Queensland
