= Qantas Founders Museum =

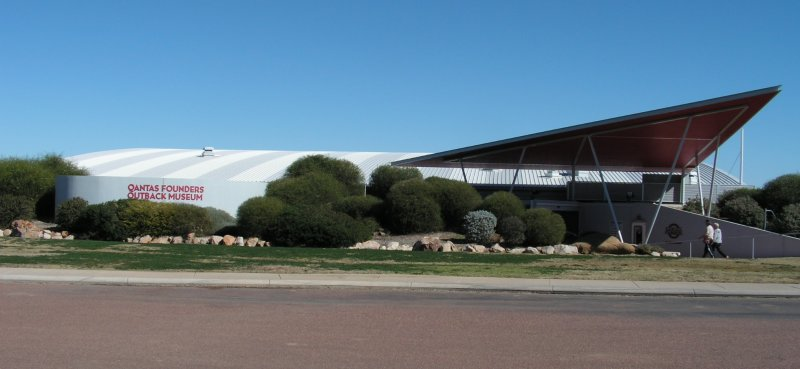
- Entrance to the main museum building

- Location within Queensland
- Established: 1996
- Location: Longreach, Queensland, Australia
- Coordinates: 23.4399°S 144.2706°E
- Type: Aviation museum
- Website: www.qfom.com.au

The Qantas Founders Museum is a museum located in Longreach, Queensland, Australia. The museum opened on 9 June 1996 in the heritage-listed Qantas Hangar, built by Qantas in 1922. Stage 2 of the Qantas Founders Museum was part of a 1999 $110 million Queensland and Federal government project, the heritage trails network. The Qantas Founders Museum is located 177 kilometres (110 mi) from Winton, Queensland, the original home of Qantas.

The museum tells the history of Qantas, from its early beginnings in Outback Queensland in the 1920s to present day. Qantas was registered on 16 November 1920 and held its first board meeting in Winton in 1921 where it was decided to move operations to Longreach. The Qantas Founders Museum has a variety of interactive displays and exhibits telling the many stories of the airline over its 100-year history.

== Display items ==
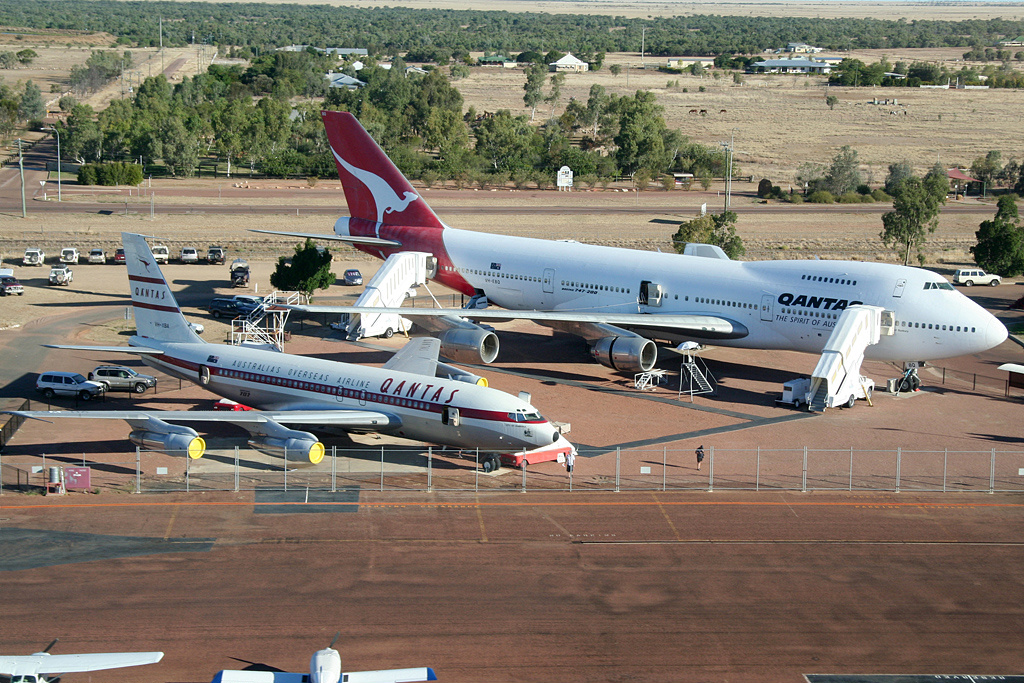
Qantas Boeing 707 and Boeing 747-200 at museum in June 2009

The museum is home to a number of aircraft which can be observed by the public in the museum and on guided tours. The aircraft include a decommissioned Qantas Boeing 747-200 that arrived in November 2002, a Boeing 707, a Consolidated PBY Catalina, a replica Avro 504K, a replica de Havilland DH.50, a replica de Havilland DH.61 and a former Qantas Douglas DC-3,.

The Boeing 707 is the airline's first jet, a Boeing 707 short body. The 707 was the first of its type and specifically manufactured for Qantas. It is also the only 707 currently on display in a museum in passenger-carrying configuration, with all other preserved 707s being former military examples.

The Boeing 707 was restored at Southend Airport in England and returned to Australia in December 2006, 47 years after its delivery from Boeing to Qantas. During its return the 707's flight path saw it eventually landing in Sydney, however it took a flight path of over a 31,500 kilometres (19,600 mi) and an eight-day journey from Southend Airport via Ireland, the Canary Islands, Bermuda, the United States and Fiji, to get to Sydney in 2006. It was then transported to Longreach in June 2007. The Australian government provided $1 million as a contribution to the cost of the aircraft's restoration.

The 707 held at the Qantas Founders Museum was the first jet aircraft of any type owned by Qantas. The aircraft is known under the registration VH-EBA and the plane name "City of Canberra.". The restoration of VH-EBA lasted 15,000 hours. The 707 VH-EBA was the first in its fleet and is a sister plane to the last 707 which was ordered by Qantas known previously under the registration "VH-EBM", and the plane name 'City of Launceston' that was owned and piloted by Qantas Ambassador John Travolta.

In September 2014 the museum purchased a derelict Lockheed C-121 Constellation, a former United States Navy C-121J (Bu No 131623) N4247K c/n 4144 that had been impounded at Manila International Airport for more than 25 years. The aircraft was disassembled for shipment to Australia. Over five years the interior and exterior of the Super Constellation was restored by volunteers and contractors to resemble the Qantas Super Constellation 'Southern Spray" VH-EAM. Restoration of this aircraft was completed in 2019 and will be on display to the public later in 2020.

In September 2019, work began on the construction of a $14.3 million Airpark Roof and Light and Sound Show Project. This project was funded by the Australian and Queensland Governments and is expected to be completed in 2020. The Airpark Roof will provide protection from the sun to Museum visitors and the museum's Boeing 747, 707, DC-3 and Super Constellation. The Light and Sound Show uses state of the art light and sound technology to tell the history of Qantas by projecting onto the fuselage of the Boeing 747, Super Constellation and Boeing 707.

In April 2021, members of the Qantas Board unveiled a new exhibit at the museum, a custom-made replica of the Boeing 747 onboard Captain Cook Lounges from the 1970s. The Captain Cook Lounges were features of the earliest Boeing 747-200s operated by Qantas from 1971, until the introduction in 1979 of Qantas's first Business class deck 747.

== See also ==
- Australian Stockman's Hall of Fame
- List of transport museums
