= Q150 =

Anniversary of Queensland's separation

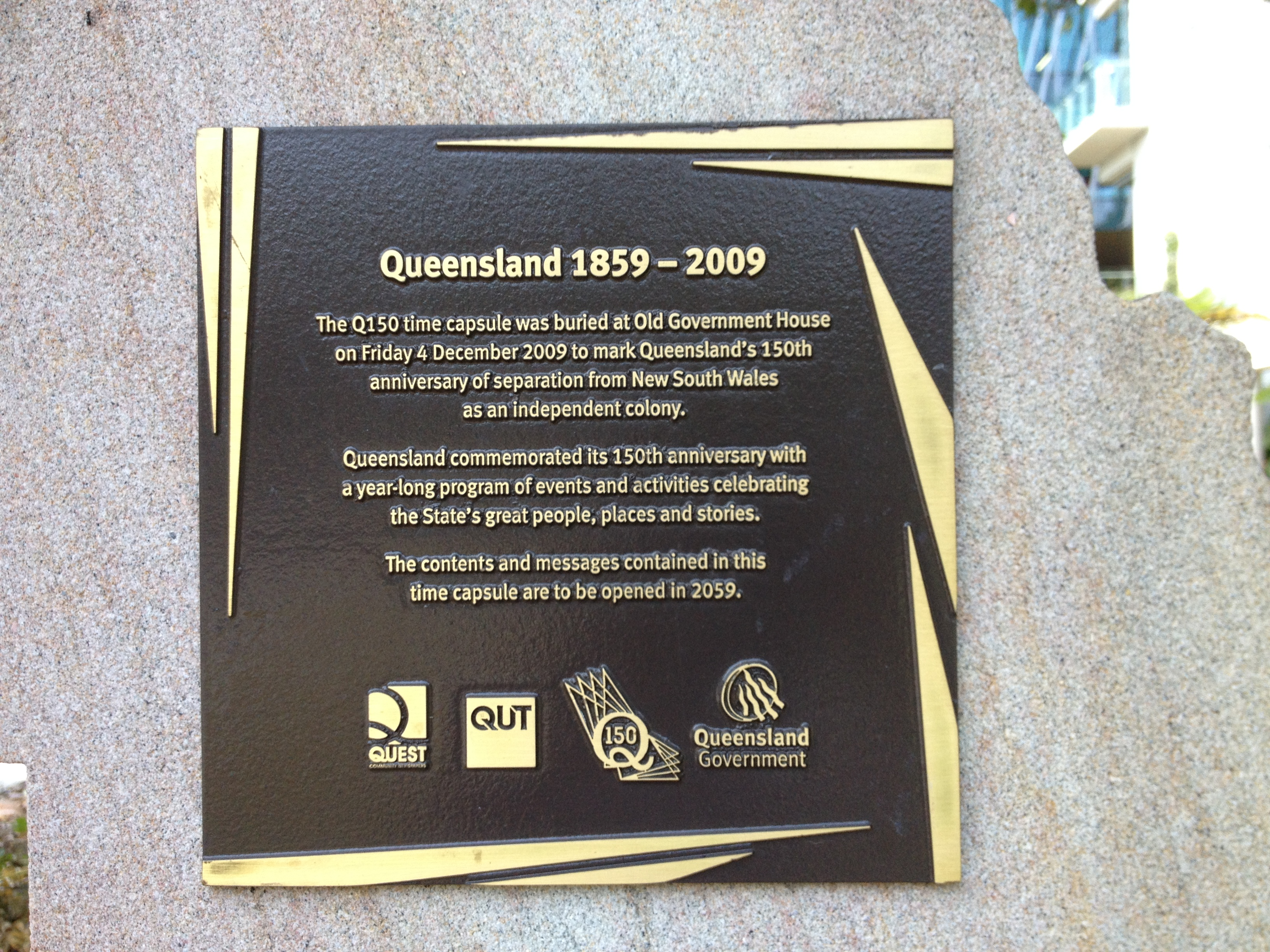
Plaque on Q150 time capsule, Old Government House

Q150 was the sesquicentenary (150th anniversary) of the Separation of Queensland from New South Wales in 1859. Separation established the Colony of Queensland which became the State of Queensland in 1901 as part of the Federation of Australia. Q150 was celebrated in 2009.

== Celebrations ==
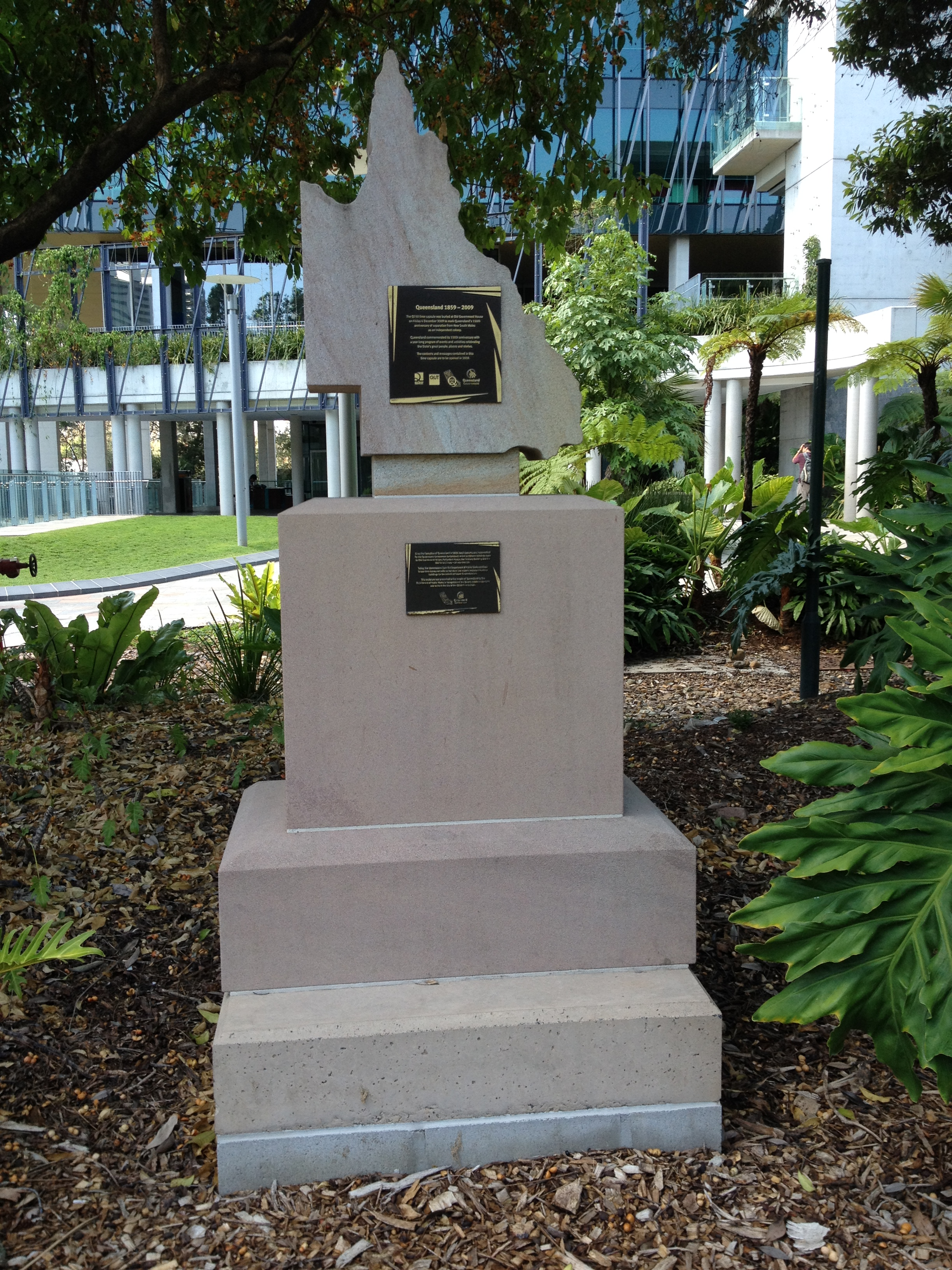
The Q150 time capsule, Old Government House

The Queensland government and other Queensland organisations celebrated the occasion with many events and publications, including:

- announcement of the 150 icons of Queensland by the Queensland Premier Anna Bligh
- placement of a time capsule in the grounds of Old Government House
- the creation of monuments at significant survey points in Queensland's history by the Surveying and Spatial Sciences Institute to honour the many early explorer/surveyors who mapped the state
- the State Library of Queensland collected stories from notable Queenslanders, as part of the Storylines - Q150 digital stories project.

Many local communities celebrated Q150 in various ways. In Coominya, the local heritage society commissioned a series of murals depicting early life at the town.

== See also ==
- List of Queensland's Q150 Icons
