= Shire of Longreach =

Coordinates: 23.448°S 144.245°E

- Local government area
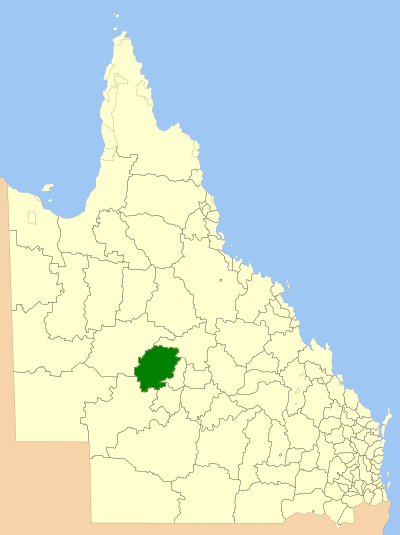
- Location within Queensland

- Country: Australia
- State: Queensland
- Established: 1900
- Council seat: Longreach

Area
  - Total: 23,561.4 km^{2} (9,097.1 sq mi)

Population
  - Total: 4,180 (2006 census)
  - Density: 0.17741/km^{2} (0.4595/sq mi)
LGAs around Shire of Longreach
| Winton | Winton | Aramac |
| Winton | Shire of Longreach | Ilfracombe |
| Barcoo | Barcoo | Isisford |

The Shire of Longreach was a local government area located in central western Queensland, centred on the town of Longreach, from which the shire was administered. It covered an area of 23,561.4 square kilometres (9,097.1 sq mi), and existed as a local government entity from 1900 until 2008, when it amalgamated with the Shires of Ilfracombe and Isisford to form the Longreach Region.

== History ==
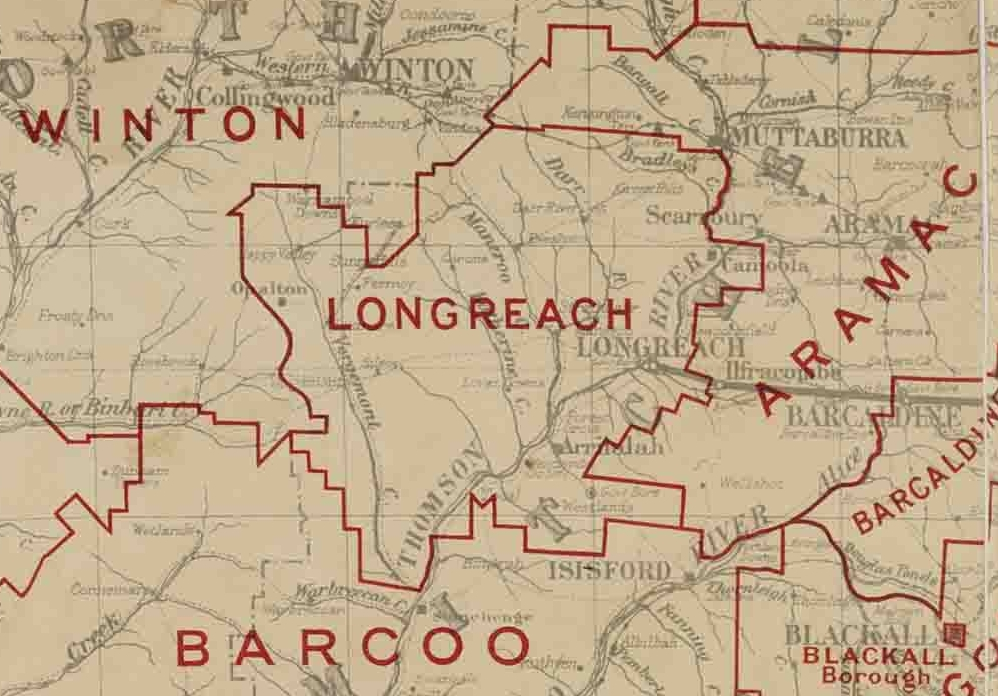
Map of Longreach Division and adjacent local government areas, March 1902

The Longreach Division was created on 9 May 1900 under the Divisional Boards Act 1887, out of part of the Aramac Division.

With the passage of the Local Authorities Act 1902, Longreach Division became the Shire of Longreach on 31 March 1903.

On 15 March 2008, under the Local Government (Reform Implementation) Act 2007 passed by the Parliament of Queensland on 10 August 2007, the Shire of Longreach merged with the Shires of Ilfracombe and Isisford to form the Longreach Region.

Traditionally, a pastoral area, the shire increasingly became a tourist destination with attractions such as the Australian Stockman's Hall of Fame and the Qantas Founders Museum.

== Towns and localities ==
The Shire of Longreach included the following settlements:

- Longreach
- Arrilalah
- Camoola
- Chorregon
- Ernestina
- Maneroo
- Morella
- Tocal
- Vergemont

== Chairmen ==
1927: R. L. H. Peterson

== Population ==
| Year | Population |
|---|---|
| 1933 | 4,564 |
| 1947 | 4,137 |
| 1954 | 4,343 |
| 1961 | 5,013 |
| 1966 | 4,959 |
| 1971 | 4,300 |
| 1976 | 4,052 |
| 1981 | 3,846 |
| 1986 | 3,871 |
| 1991 | 4,369 |
| 1996 | 4,419 |
| 2001 | 4,368 |
| 2006 | 4,180 |
