= Langenbaker House =

Historic house in Queensland, Australia

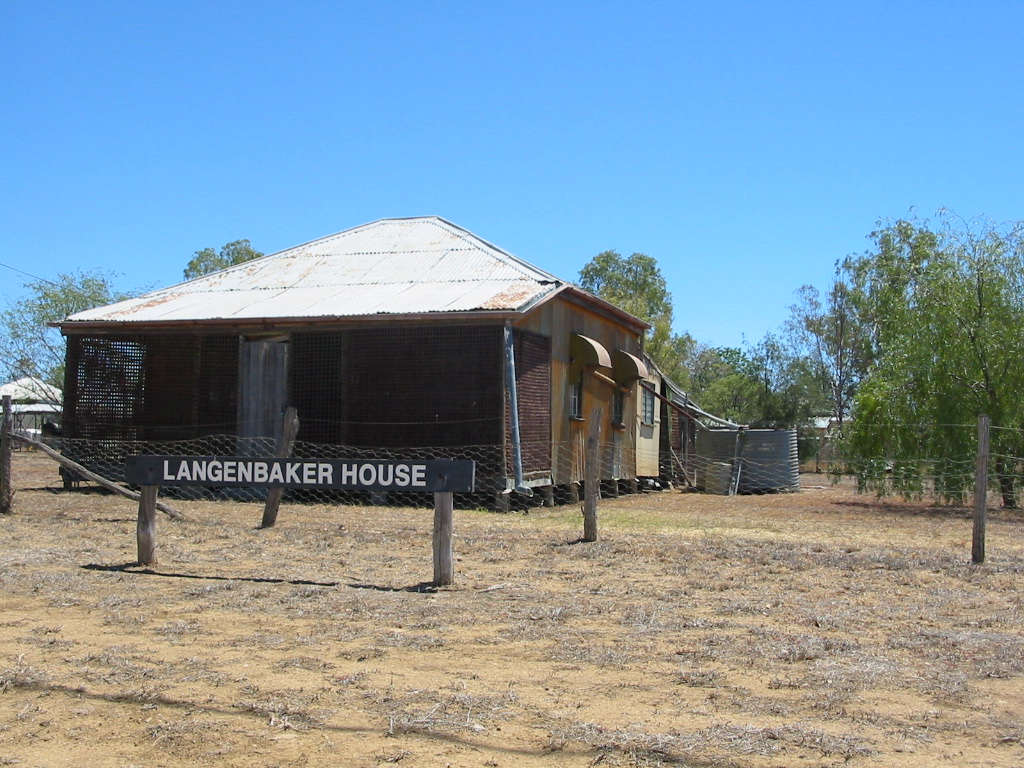
- Langenbaker House, 2003

- Location within Queensland Location within Australia
- 23.4918°S 144.5087°E
- Location: Mitchell Street, Ilfracombe, Longreach Region, Queensland, Australia

History
- Design period: 1870s–1890s (late 19th century)
- Built: Before 1899

Queensland Heritage Register
- Official name: Langenbaker House
- Type: state heritage (built, landscape)
- Designated: 29 November 2001
- Reference no.: 601088
- Significant period: 1890s–1930s (fabric); 1890s–1991 (historical)
- Significant components: fence/wall – perimeter, tank – water, residential accommodation – main house, furniture/fittings, garage, shed – storage, trees/plantings

Langenbaker House is a heritage-listed detached house at Mitchell Street, Ilfracombe, Longreach Region, Queensland, Australia. It was erected in Ilfracombe in 1899, but was originally built earlier at another location. It was added to the Queensland Heritage Register on 29 November 2001.

== History ==
Langenbaker house, a small single story corrugated iron and timber house, was erected in Ilfracombe in 1899 by owner Harry Langenbaker, an outback teamster or carrier by trade.

The town of Ilfracombe dates from 1890, when ambitious settlers anticipated the arrival of the Central Western railway. However, some of Australia's largest and best known sheep stations had been established in the area from 1864. Rodney Downs, Portland Downs, Beaconsfield and Wellshot were the original holdings in what later became the Shire of Ilfracombe. From September 1891 Ilfracombe was a strategic railhead for teamster's traffic, positioned close to the final terminus of the Central Western railway line at Longreach to capture road traffic from the large stations toward Aramac and Muttaburra in the north, and to the lower Barcoo in the south.

Teamsters or carriers as they were sometimes known, provided an essential service of carrying goods and stock across trackless country to the new stations of western Queensland. The first teamsters into a new country were limited to the use of drays, which were more manoeuvrable than wagons. Among the essential equipment of these first teamsters were axes to clear tracts of land, picks and shovels to make creek crossings and a piece of brightly coloured rag. The rag was tied to a wheel so that its revolutions could be easily counted. These rough measurements of distance gave carriers a guide for cartage charges and provided a bush standard which remained in use until the introduction of surveyors and roadmakers. Ilfracombe provided work for teamsters up until a branch railway line was opened from Jericho to Blackall in 1908. At this time many teamsters traded in their horse and ox and replaced them with motor lorries. Others hung up their reins and looked for work with the railways or at the wool scour which opened in Ilfracombe in 1898.

Henry (Harry) and Mary Ann Langenbaker née Kahl, came to Ilfracombe in 1899 from Barcaldine, where they had married in 1890. They brought their house with them on their horse-drawn wagon. Like many other teamster families it is likely that both the Langenbaker's and their house had already moved several times to various locations at temporary railheads along the railway line. Langenbaker house was assembled on Mitchell Street, Ilfracombe, in about April 1899 and remained in the family until 1991 with the passing of Harry and Mary Ann's youngest son Bernard.

Harry Langenbaker, was one of many teamsters who took advantage of the chance which Ilfracombe offered to keep his teams in work. Bernard Langenbaker, youngest son of Harry and Mary Ann describes his father's life as a teamster:

Dad worked down on the lower Barcoo. Often he would be away for twelve months at a time, and while there was work to be had he wouldn't come home. While he was away Mum would often play the piano on Saturday nights at euchre parties and dances at the hall next to the hotel. This way she got a few shillings to battle along. Dad had switched from bullocks to horses for his wagons when he came to Ilfracombe, and I suppose he had about 50 horses altogether. The Gooch family, the Baileys, the Hanifins and Storches all had horses too, so when the teams weren't working there might be 500 horses running on the stock routes and reserves around the town.

Harry was a typical teamster - hard working and hard living. Evidence of both his life and work exist in the Langenbaker house in the form of personal memorabilia and tools of his trade. Harry, unlike many others, continued to work as a teamster up until 1922 at which time he pulled his wagon to its final resting place at the side of the house and passed the time by making skewers for the local butcher and greenhide whips. In contrast, his wife Mary Ann was ladylike and dainty. She was an accomplished needlewoman, and many examples of her craft can be seen in the house. She was also a skilled pianist who taught piano to many Ilfracombe children, and whose services were much in demand at town social gatherings.

Harry and Mary Ann had eleven children. Ruby, born in 1891, Lillian born 1893, Julius born 1895, Ivy born 1897, Harold (Sonny) born 1899, Thelma born 1901, Les born 1904, William Roy born 1906, Estelle Gladys (Stella) born 1908, Vera born 1911 and Bernard born 1913. Three daughters married into the Bailey family, prominent carriers and business people in the town. Another four children intermarried with other local families, creating a network of relationships and friendships.

Affectionately known as "Daddy Lang" and "Mumma Lang" a feature of family life for many years, even after the marriages of the children, was a regular gathering at the Langenbaker house. In 1993 Marge Escreet (born 1922) daughter of Ruby Bailey née Langenbaker describes a typical afternoon at the Langenbaker's.

All the Langenbaker girls and their children used to gather for afternoon tea and to see their mother most days. There was a large pepperina tree (Schinus molle) at the side of the house, chairs and stools stayed outside and afternoon tea was held outside. The children used to ride bikes and play on the big old wooden swing. They would stay there until the shade of the house came over and joined with the shade of the pepperina tree. It was lovely and cool out there. You would get a breeze out there. Dadda Lang built the swing. It was made from big heavy bush timber, and the trace chins from his harness. It was just near the back door behind the water tank.

The Langenbakers sixth child Les, was blind as the result of a horse riding accident in about 1921. After this time the family took care to change the layout and features of the house as little as possible so that Les could easily find his way about. This is one reason for the remarkably unchanged condition of the house today. It is full of old photographs, bric a brac and other personal items including a tennis trophy won by Bernie Langenbaker and Marge Escreet at the Central Western doubles championship. Other items include early metal all-purpose tubs, a hand made wheelbarrow, a galvanised iron bath, an upturned hand made galvanised iron boat and more personal items including early 1930s hairdressing equipment.

Following damage caused by a windstorm in 1933 the rear verandah was enclosed and extended and the kitchen built in its present location. At about this time the originally corrugated iron gabled roof was also replaced by a corrugated iron hipped roof. In about 1942 an air raid shelter was excavated to the east of the rear of the house, but there is now no clear above ground evidence of this feature. Another notable feature of the house is the use of laced hoop iron to provide screening for the verandah. The hoop iron was originally used at the wool scour to bind wool bale packs and wool bales. Townspeople found the material ideal to create shaded semi-enclosed verandahs. The technique was once seen on most Ilfracombe houses, but now survives only at the Langenbaker house.

The last child of the family, Bernard, was born in the house in 1913 and died there in 1991. The house was then bought by the Ilfracombe Shire Council and has been conserved as a monument to the ordinary men and women of the outback.

== Description ==
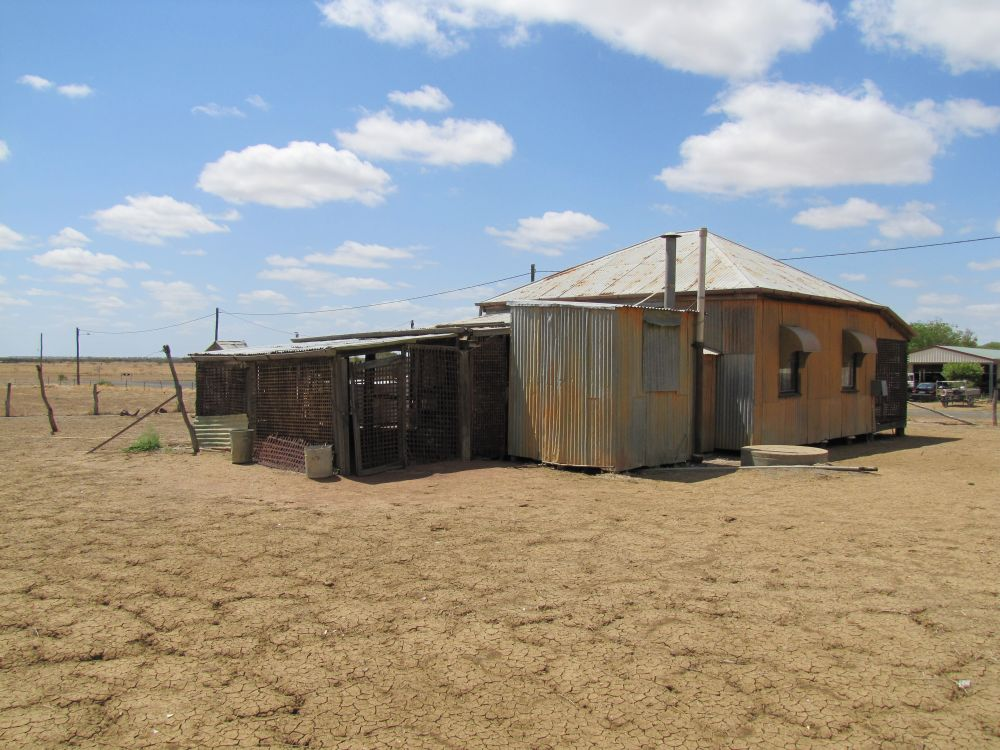
Rear view of the house, 2013

Langenbaker house is located in the centre of town on Mitchell Street, Ilfracombe, and is described as Lot 908 on Plan No. 14173 being the whole of the land contained in Deed of Grant. Like most of the town's houses, Langenbaker house was brought from elsewhere - the light timber frame construction making it easy to dismantle and re-assemble.

There are four principal structures remaining on the land: the dwelling house, a garage, a shed and a lavatory.

=== The dwelling house ===
The house is set on low stumps. It consists of a front verandah, a lounge, three bedrooms, a combined kitchen/dining/storage area, a back verandah with bathroom off to the side, and a ground level lean-to verandah. It has a semi-detached rain water tank.

The house is constructed of corrugated iron and timber and appears to have originally consisted of a front verandah; a central hallway with three bedrooms and one lounge room; rear verandah and semi-detached kitchen. The rear verandah is now fully enclosed and the original gabled roof has been replaced by a corrugated iron hipped roof. Windows facing to the south east and north west all have metal awnings. The front verandah is enclosed using laced hoop iron.

The interior of the home is as it was at the date of the son's accident, in approximately 1921. Parts of the bedroom, lounge room and kitchen walls and ceiling are clad with timber paneling. Other interior areas still have exposed corrugated iron walls and wooden beams. Furnishings within the home are of humble design, with some furnishings being hand-built by the owner. The central lounge still houses a Radio-Gram and the later addition of a television. Photos, Bric a Brac and other household utensils remain in the home.

=== Other structures ===
To the north west of the house, there is a former garage, now filled with bric a brac. To the north east of the house, a shed, also partly filled with bric a brac. To the east of the house, there is a detached lavatory.

An aggregation of building materials on the rear of the allotment, roughly between the two sheds, is the remains of a butcher's shop which was one conducted in Ilfracombe by Syd Bailey. The original outdoor toilet with provision for night soil removal also still exists at the side of the dwelling.

The site is fenced, although the front gate has been removed. Shedding for vehicles and horses (night horse) still exist in the yard surrounding the home. No gardens have survived except for the peppercorn tree in the front of the yard.

== Heritage listing ==
Langenbaker House was listed on the Queensland Heritage Register on 29 November 2001 having satisfied the following criteria.

The place is important in demonstrating the evolution or pattern of Queensland's history.

Langenbaker House, relocated to Ilfracombe in 1899, is a rare example of what was once a typical Ilfracombe workers dwelling and demonstrates the evolution and pattern of western Queensland's transport industry and the development of western Queensland towns and communities.

The place demonstrates rare, uncommon or endangered aspects of Queensland's cultural heritage.

Langenbaker House, relocated to Ilfracombe in 1899, is a rare example of what was once a typical Ilfracombe workers dwelling and demonstrates the evolution and pattern of western Queensland's transport industry and the development of western Queensland towns and communities.

The place is important in demonstrating the principal characteristics of a particular class of cultural places.

Langenbaker House is thought to be one of the earliest surviving residences in Ilfracombe and a good example of what was once a typical workers cottage. The architectural style of the building and the significance of the removal and relocation of the property to its present site, demonstrates an approach to building design that was influenced by climate, culture and resources. This is particularly evident in the use of metal bales straps woven into a lattice and fixed to the front verandah of the house which demonstrates the creative ability of early settlers to make do with fabrics and materials at hand.

The place has a special association with the life or work of a particular person, group or organisation of importance in Queensland's history.

Langenbaker House reflects the life and work of Harry and Mary Ann Langenbaker. Remaining virtually unchanged since its erection in Ilfracombe, the house and its contents, including personal memorabilia and numerous household utensils, provides an insight into the life of a pioneering family and the establishment of the town of Ilfracombe. Relocated from Barcaldine to Ilfracombe in 1899 by Harry and Mary Ann Langenbaker, the house remained in the Langenbaker family until 1991 with the passing of Harry and Mary Ann's youngest son, Bernard.
