= Arrilalah =

Ghost town of western Queensland

Arrilalah Longreach, Queensland
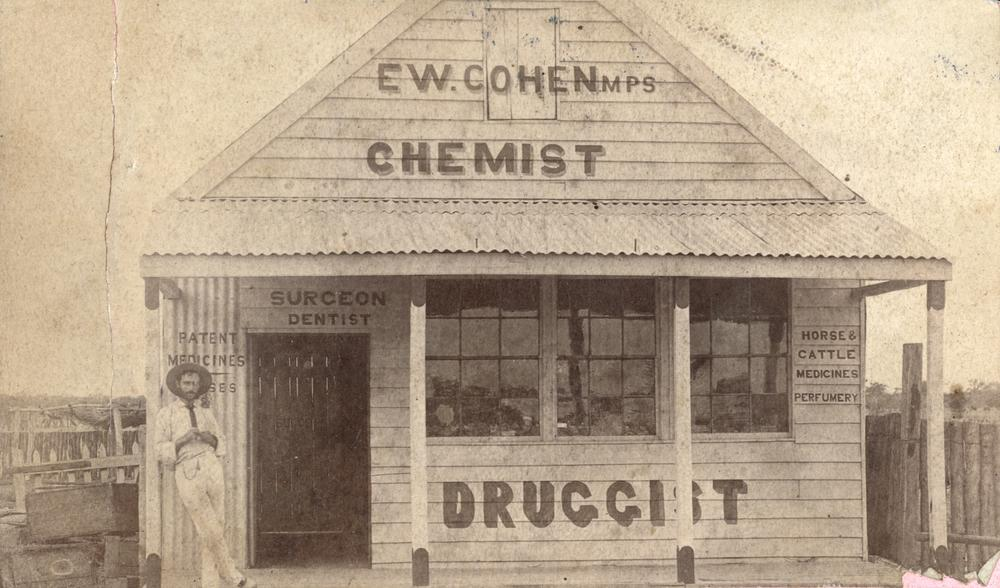
- Chemist building in Arrilalah, 1884

- Coordinates: 23.6806°S 143.8828°E
- Postcode(s): 4730
- Location: 51.2 km (32 mi) SW of Longreach; 467 km (290 mi) W of Emerald; 738 km (459 mi) W of Rockhampton; 1,230 km (764 mi) NW of Brisbane
- LGA(s): Longreach Region
- State electorate(s): Gregory
- Federal division(s): Maranoa

Arrilalah is a ghost town in the locality of Longreach in the Longreach Region of western Queensland, Australia, beside the Thompson River floodplain. Originally on the main stock route south, the loss of a proposed railway line in 1892 in favour of the newer town of Longreach saw the decline of the town by the 1930s.

== History ==
The site was originally settled in the 1860s with the name "Forest Grove" (and possibly "Hopkins' Camp" before that), but the name was changed to Arrilalah, a word with an uncertain origin, in 1885. One source suggests a First Nations word meaning for good feeding ground for galahs and cockatoos. Near to former Forest Grove was also a sheep property, Bandon Grove.

Growth

The Commercial Hotel was built in 1884; the nearest telegraph station and court house were at Isisford, 75 miles (121 km) away.

The November 1885 sale of government lands for the township occurred, enhanced with a proposed Central Railway line coming to the town "crawling out West very vigorously" from Barcaldine. This resulted in the change in ownership of the Forest Grove Hotel, being renamed as the Club Hotel (constructed of pise, later replaced by wood and iron), and more shops planned.

Land prices increased and buildings increased with the Royal Hotel and billiard room, two bakers, two saddlers, two butchers, two blacksmiths, and bootmakers. In its heyday, Arrilalah was given to have four or five hotels, two stores, a chemist's shop, police station, school, and blacksmith's shop. It was reported a footrace was used to determine who would keep a blacksmith's store, between later-politician John Payne (1860–1928) and his partner – Payne won.

District properties included Bimbah, Bimerah, Evesham, Maneroo, Oorona, Silaoe, Strath Darr, Tocal, Vergemont, and Westland. Eight miles from the town, the 92 by 48 feet (28 m × 15 m) Rosabel station woolshed burned down in February 1927, and the station homestead itself in November 1933.

At one time competing, both Arrilalah and Stonehenge to the south stated they had "the prettiest racecourse on the river". The Arrilalah Race Club was operating to 1929, before restarting in 1936.

Petitions were submitted by 1887 championing for an overland telegraph line.

January 1887 saw the local police constable F. Moran get lost travelling from Arrilalah to Isisford on transfer. He was located fourteen days later, emaciated, naked and bleeding; the officer later claiming his packhorse took off, and later, intense rains and flooding. (It is unknown if this was a case of potentially being "murdered by the government", where immigrants from England were sent out as new police officers into the foreign west of the State unprepared. Moran later returned to police the town in February 1889.) A police station and court house were constructed by December 1889 with a sergeant in charge. At one point there were three officers stationed in the town. The police station closed in 1926. The police buildings became part of a government sale in April 1938.

Arrilalah Provisional School opened c. 1889 and closed in 1906 due to low attendances.

The town also had involvement in the 1891 Australian shearers' strike.

Decline

The town began a long decline when the railway bypassed it, instead connecting to the nearby and younger town of Longreach to the north in 1892. By 1928, the area surrounding the town was resumed by the grazing homesteads. Without being a rail terminus, and the transport evolution from horses to motor vehicle, buildings in Arrilalah were removed, with just one public hotel remaining by the 1930s. Two surveys for railway extensions to Jundah did not eventuate.

After past requests, by 1936 the town became the main link in the Longreach–Windorah telephone line.

By March 1950, during a widespread district flooding event, Arrilalah was referred to as "a one-house town 32 miles south of Longreach".

== Today ==
By the 1980s, there were no permanent inhabitants remaining.

The local cemetery, formerly in Aramac Shire, was rededicated in 2010, and was the site of approximately forty burials. One internment, and restored grave, is that of 29-year-old Senior Constable William Considine who died from an unfortunate incident at some cattleyards on 18 February 1887. Considine was one of the members to locate the lost Constable Moran the month prior.
