= Longreach Powerhouse =

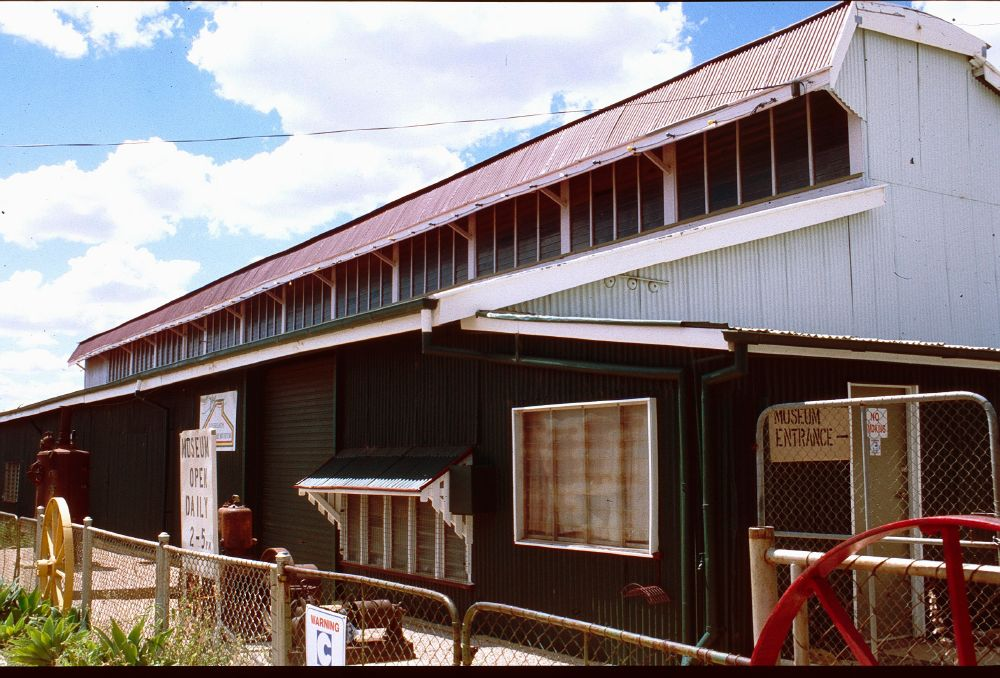
- Longreach Powerhouse, 1998

- Location within Queensland Location within Australia
- 23.4404°S 144.2455°E
- Location: 12 Swan Street, Longreach, Longreach Region, Queensland, Australia

History
- Design period: 1919–1930s (interwar period)
- Built: 1921

Queensland Heritage Register
- Official name: Longreach Powerhouse (former), Longreach Powerhouse Museum
- Type: state heritage (built)
- Designated: 24 June 1999
- Reference no.: 601541
- Significant period: 1921–1985 (historical); 1921–ongoing (social)
- Significant components: shed/s, pond/s – cooling, views to, machinery/plant/equipment – utilities – gas/electricity supply, swimming pool, workshop, urban services – electricity/gas/water supply/sewerage
- Builders: Edward and Martin

Longreach Powerhouse is a heritage-listed former power station and now museum at 12 Swan Street, Longreach, Longreach Region, Queensland, Australia. It was built in 1921 by Edward and Martin. It is now known as Longreach Powerhouse Museum. It was added to the Queensland Heritage Register on 24 June 1999.

== History ==
The Longreach Powerhouse began operating in 1921 under the Longreach Shire Council until 1966 when it came under the control of the Central West Regional Electricity Board and later the Capricornia Regional Electricity Board. The former Longreach Powerhouse was built by Edward and Martin, under the supervision of consultant engineer Norman White, and was completed by September 1921.

Electricity was generated in Longreach by at least 1908 when it was installed in the Longreach Hotel by the City Electric Light Company. The first documented moves to provide Longreach with an electric light scheme began in early 1916 when the Longreach Shire Council made enquiries about the costs of a scheme for the town. The Council appointed a consulting engineer, Norman White, to investigate the possibilities and he estimated a cost of £10,000.

After much debate, Council applied to the Queensland Treasury for a loan, but was refused as the Government of the day was undergoing a financial crisis. Undeterred, the Council and townspeople, through local member, John Payne, lobbied the Treasury and finally, in October 1919, money was made available – a sum of £16,000 as the estimates had risen considerably. Ratepayers questioned the desirability of borrowing such a large sum of money for electricity generation, citing the facts that the town still didn't have an adequate drainage system and that a proper water reticulation or sanitary scheme would be more practical. One group even lobbied vigorously for a swimming pool to be built. Council, however, went ahead and applied for an Order in Council to permit it to generate electricity as the Longreach Electric Authority. This was granted on 15 July 1920 and the Council appointed Norman White as consulting engineer and supervisor of construction.

A site was selected on the town's recreation reserve, opposite the school and behind the artesian bore. The choice was made for two reasons. Firstly, the engines would need a plentiful supply of water for cooling purposes and secondly, the electricity generated would be direct current (as opposed to today's alternating current) which does not transmit over great distances, thus, the generating station needed to be close to its potential customers. By 12 December 1920, tenders were called for the supply of machinery, poles, insulators and wire. There tenders were not met and fresh plans were drawn up and tendered in March 1921.

By 30 April 1921, the foundations for the building had been poured and the engines - Ruston and Hornsby charcoal gas units – were expected to arrive imminently. A supply of 200 poles had been obtained from the Clermont district. Work by the contractor, Edward Morton Limited, proceeded steadily and on 17 September, Council passed for payment £695 asked for the construction of the building and concreting work. The same Council meeting also noted that the installation work was over budget and now looked like costing £19,000.

At the next meeting in November, Council heard that there were problems with the engine installation and that a start-up date was uncertain. This meeting resolved to ask Queensland Treasury for a further £5,000, but a later meeting amended this figure to £6,000 undefined expenses to be paid directly by Treasury. On 12 December 1921, John Edward Lloyd Jones signed a tender to supply cord wood and charcoal to the powerhouse at the rate of 10 metric tons (9.8 long tons; 11 short tons) per month at £5 per ton.

Nothing is recorded in minutes from Council meetings between 12 December 1921 and 9 January 1922. The minutes from the meeting of 9 January indicate that the powerhouse had begun operating. In the minutes the Council called for a powerhouse manager to be appointed at £9 per week; the meeting requested Edward Martin to repair unsatisfactory concrete work at the powerhouse, indicating that engine vibration had damaged some of the concrete bedding; tenders were called to wire the Shire Office. A previous decision had been made not to have this work done until the electricity scheme was up and running and, finally, three people were to be prosecuted for illegally connecting their premises to the electricity supply. Initially, the local government reserve contained the powerhouse, swimming baths and town bore. Subsequently, the boundaries of this reserve were altered as the power station expanded. The 1938 extension to the main building necessitated the alteration of the boundaries between the recreation reserve and the local government reserve. The boundary was altered again in 1943 when the producer annex was extended. In 1958, all of the recreation reserve was regazetted to enable further expansion of the powerhouse buildings. The recreation reserve had contained four tennis courts which were relocated to the showgrounds. When the Central West Regional Electricity Board took responsibility for the power station in 1966, the boundaries of the reserve were altered again. Most of the local government reserve was regazetted a reserve for electricity purposes while a portion containing the bore was retained by the Council.

The evolution of the powerhouse reflects the growth in demand for electricity. When the powerhouse opened it primarily supplied electricity for lighting. During the 1940s, demand increased significantly as a result of two major developments, the new hospital and the upgrading of the Longreach aerodrome. The United States Air Force is credited with upgrading the landing facilities at the aerodrome. The American base in Longreach was established in May 1942 during World War II, where it remained until 24 July 1942. The 93rd and a portion of the 28th Bombardment Squadron were stationed there and it was from their Longreach base that they flew to engage in the battle of the Coral Sea in early May.

By the 1960s the powerhouse supplied other towns and rural areas under the Central West Regional Electricity Board. In 1977 the electricity supply in Queensland underwent reorganisation resulting in the powerhouse's operations being taken over by the Capricornia Regional Electricity Board. The power station continued to generate electricity until 1985 when the town and district were linked to the statewide electricity grid.

Since the first building was erected in 1921, substantial changes have occurred on the site in response to the growth in the capacity and function of the power station. The original powerhouse was of timber frame construction and clad in corrugated galvanised iron. This latter material was to be the standard cladding and roofing, with one exception, for all subsequent buildings and extensions on the site. The first major extension to the powerhouse occurred in 1934 when a workshop was added adjacent to the producer annexe. Four years later a bathroom was built and the producer annexe extended when an additional gas producer was installed.

Until 1947, there was sufficient space within the main building to accommodate the additional engines that were installed in 1938 and 1943. However, when the National FA7 was purchased, it was positioned on the western side of the main building and covered by a skillion roof.

The installation of the coal fired gas producers necessitated the construction of a separate building in 1951. In 1954, the gas producer building was extended to accommodate the second unit. At the same time as this extension was undertaken, major alterations were made to the main building. The roof was realigned to accommodate an internal mobile crane. Also, the building was extended 7 metres (23 ft) on the western side to provide full protection for the FA7 engine.

During the 1960s and 70s, the additions and alterations to the buildings continued as more equipment was installed. The main building was extended twice on the western side to accommodate the Mirrlees engines when they were installed in 1966 and 1973. In 1962, the producer building was doubled in size to provide room for the fourth gas producer. This extension was almost identical to the existing building. Other buildings constructed on the site included a garage and heavy equipment store. A new office was built soon after the Central West Regional Electricity Board took control of the power station in 1966.

The site of the Longreach Powerhouse is considerably reduced from that utilised at the peak of the power station's capacity. From 1958 the total area that had been formally gazetted as a recreation area was needed for the storage of fuel (both oil and coal) and for cooling ponds and tanks.

The powerhouse was decommissioned in 1985 when the central west became part of the state grid. Since this time, the site has been subdivided and reduced in area. In 1989, the Longreach Shire Council purchased the powerhouse and a portion of the land with the intention of converting it into a museum. The Longreach Powerhouse Museum Association commenced operations in February 1994. The powerhouse was opened as the Longreach Powerhouse Museum in September 1994.

== Description ==
The buildings which form the former powerhouse (the generating complex, engine annexe and the gas production shed) and the CAPELEC office and store today form the nucleus of the Longreach Powerhouse Museum.

The powerhouse comprises a series of large, interconnected, corrugated galvanised iron sheds of a sawn timber frame construction. Included within this structure are the engine room (1921, with extensions in 1947, 1966, 1973), gas producer room (1921, with extensions in 1938, 1950, 1954, 1962), workshop (1934) and amenities area (1938). The office and store were built in the mid 1960s.

Of the earlier buildings, the engine room and its annexe and the gas producer room are of two distinct types of construction. The engine room is constructed of a sawn timber frame with a trussed roof structure. Both walls and roof sheeting have been replaced at least in parts. The amenities wing east of the engine room is similarly of sawn timber frame construction. The amenity rooms are clad in corrugated galvanised iron externally and lined internally with composition board. The workshop, constructed in 1934 is a sawn timber framed with trussed roof clad in corrugated iron without internal lining. By contrast, the gas producer rooms are constructed of large timber posts set directly into the ground and to which a sawn timber frame is attached. The building is clad with corrugated iron sheeting. Roof trusses, supporting corrugated roof sheeting, are themselves supported at mid-span by hardwood poles.

Ten engine sets and gas producers are located within the engine and gas producer rooms. The galvanised iron cladding is attached to a timber framework on massive timber uprights. The full width and half-width suspended roof trusses are large scale with king and queen post construction.

The separate office and store was built in the mid 1960s. To the east of this building is evidence of the cooling pond which was formerly the swimming baths.

== Heritage listing ==
The former Longreach Powerhouse was listed on the Queensland Heritage Register on 24 June 1999 having satisfied the following criteria.

The place is important in demonstrating the evolution or pattern of Queensland's history.

The former Longreach Powerhouse is significant providing evidence in the remaining buildings and machinery of the earliest generation of electricity in Longreach and the development of the industry within the district. The former Longreach Powerhouse is significant for the evidence contained within the surviving fabric that the generation of electricity was formerly a local undertaking. The size and scale of the powerhouse operation on this site from 1921–1985 signifies the role played by the local shire council in electrical generation as one of a number of services to the community of the town and district.

The place demonstrates rare, uncommon or endangered aspects of Queensland's cultural heritage.

The surviving engines and equipment are significant as evidence of the first application of coal-fired gas producers in the electricity industry within Australia. This equipment was built specifically for the Longreach Powerhouse by Major Furnace and Combustions Pty Ltd in Melbourne.

The place is important because of its aesthetic significance.

The former Powerhouse demonstrates the importance of the site to the town and provides landmark value to the area.

The place has a strong or special association with a particular community or cultural group for social, cultural or spiritual reasons.

With an area initially gazetted for recreation purposes, including tennis courts, and also containing the local swimming pool, the site of the former Longreach Powerhouse is significant for its association with the people of Longreach both as a recreational reserve and later as the source of the town's electricity supply, ushering in a new era in the town's history and changing forever the lives of the people.

== Engineering heritage award ==
The power station received an Engineering Heritage Marker from Engineers Australia as part of its Engineering Heritage Recognition Program.
