= Eremophila woodiae =

Scientific classification
- Kingdom: Plantae
- Clade: Tracheophytes
- Clade: Angiosperms
- Clade: Eudicots
- Clade: Asterids
- Order: Lamiales
- Family: Scrophulariaceae
- Genus: Eremophila
- Species: E. woodiae

Binomial name
- Eremophila woodiae Edginton

Species of flowering plant

Eremophila woodiae is a flowering plant in the figwort family, Scrophulariaceae and is endemic to western central Queensland. It is a small shrub with linear to lance-shaped leaves crowded near the ends of the branches, hairy sepals and violet to light purple petals.

== Description ==
Eremophila woodiae is a shrub that typically grows to a height of 0.5 m (1 ft 8 in) and has glandular-hairy leaves, petioles and sepals. The leaves are arranged spirally, densely crowded near the ends of the branches, linear to lance-shaped, 12–22 mm (0.47–0.87 in) long and 1.5–3 mm (0.059–0.118 in) wide, tapering to a petiole 0.5–1 mm (0.020–0.039 in) long. The flowers are borne singly in leaf axils on a pedicel 1–2 mm (0.039–0.079 in) long. There are five sepals 12–14.5 mm (0.47–0.57 in) long with lobes of three different sizes. The petals are 14–19 mm (0.55–0.75 in) long and are joined at their lower end to form a tube 11–14 mm (0.43–0.55 in) long. The petal tube and its lobes are violet to light purple with two lips 4–5 mm (0.16–0.20 in) long. The upper lip has two lobes and the lower lip has three lobes divided for most of their length, the central lobes slightly longer and broader than the lateral lobes. Two of the four stamens are fully enclosed in the petal tube and the other two extend slightly beyond. Flowering occurs between May and November and is followed by fruit that are egg-shaped to conical, 5–8 mm (0.20–0.31 in) long and 3.5–5.5 mm (0.14–0.22 in) wide and glabrous.

== Taxonomy and naming ==
Eremophila woodiae was first formally described in 2015 by Mark Alexander Edginton in the journal Austrobaileya. The specific epithet (woodiae) honours Aileen Wood, a long-term staff member at the Queensland Herbarium.

== Distribution and habitat ==
This eremophila grows in sparse, stunted woodland on barren plateaux near Opalton and Vergemont, west of Longreach and south of Winton in western central Queensland.

== Conservation status ==
Eremophila woodiae is classified as of "least concern" under the Queensland Government Nature Conservation Act 1992.
