= Longreach Ambulance Centre =

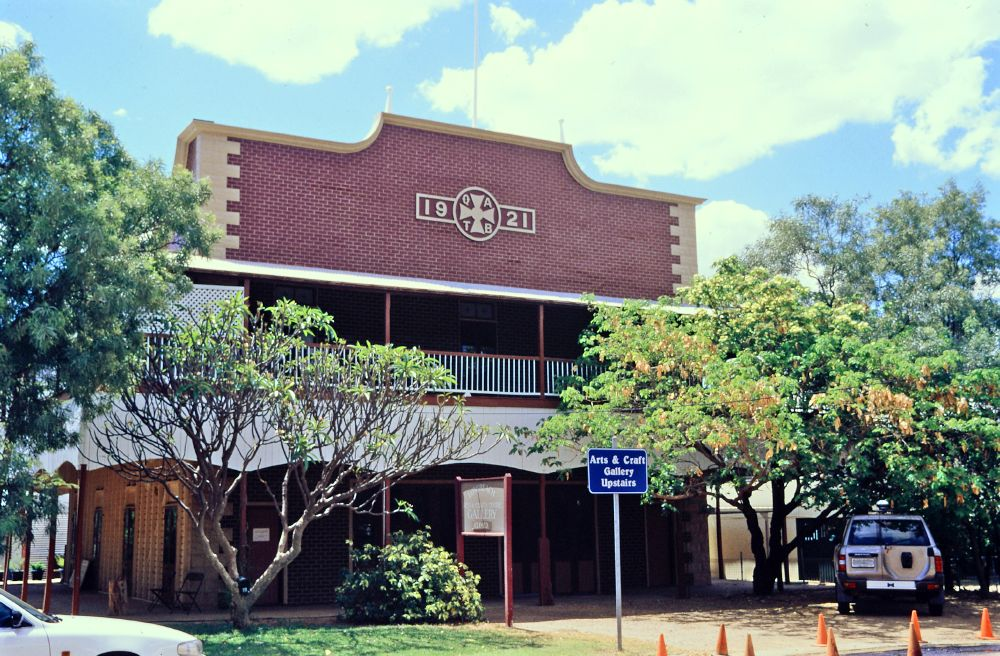
- Longreach Ambulance Centre, 1998

- Location within Queensland Location within Australia
- 23.4401°S 144.2461°E
- Location: 111 Ibis Street, Longreach, Longreach Region, Queensland, Australia

History
- Design period: 1919–1930s (interwar period)
- Built: 1921

Site notes
- Architect(s): George Meacham and Archibald Solway

Queensland Heritage Register
- Official name: QATB Centre (former), Longreach Arts & Crafts Centre
- Type: state heritage (built)
- Designated: 21 October 1992
- Reference no.: 600663
- Significant period: 1921 (fabric); 1920s–1950s (historical)
- Significant components: residential accommodation – superintendent's house/quarters
- Builders: Edwards, Martin Ltd

Longreach Ambulance Centre is a heritage-listed ambulance station at 111 Ibis Street, Longreach, Longreach Region, Queensland, Australia. It was designed by George Meacham and Archibald Solway and built in 1921 by Edwards, Martin Ltd. It is also known as Queensland Ambulance Transport Brigade Centre, QATB Centre, and Longreach Arts & Crafts Centre. It was added to the Queensland Heritage Register on 21 October 1992.

== History ==
The former Queensland Ambulance Transport Brigade (QATB) centre in Longreach is a two-storey timber building purpose built for the Brigade in 1921, and in use as an Arts and Crafts centre since 1973.

The Queensland Ambulance Transport Brigade began in Brisbane in 1892. It was formed by Seymour Warrian of the Army Medical Corps after seeing an accident victim suffer considerable aggravation of his injuries through inexpert transport to hospital. The Brigade aimed to provide first aid and skilled transport to hospital for the sick and injured. In the first years the Brigade was wholly funded by subscription, but met such an important need that from 1895 they were subsidised by the Queensland Government, both directly and by involving the Department of Works in the construction of ambulance buildings. In the late 1890s and 1900s they expanded into regional centres. By 1921, a specific layout for ambulance buildings had been formalised into policy. This incorporated a space for vehicles with easy street access, a casualty room, meeting room and sleeping room for ambulance bearers on a ground floor level and residential quarters for the superintendent above.

The Longreach branch of the Queensland Ambulance Transport Brigade was formed on 24 June 1919. A modified Buick car was purchased from Brisbane, and the ambulance began operations from the Commercial Hotel, before moving to premises in Galah Street, and then Crane Street. In 1920, the Ambulance Brigade committee petitioned the Queensland Government for a dedicated reserve for ambulance offices at Longreach, and this was granted at 111 Ibis Street. After a year of highly successful fundraising, the committee was able to commission the construction of a purpose-designed ambulance building. Plans were submitted by Mr George Meacham and the Brigade superintendent, Mr Archibald Solway, and the contract let in 1921 to Messrs Edwards, Martin Ltd of Longreach, with a price of £3,185. The building was opened free of debt in May 1921, by the Longreach Shire Chairman, Mr Edward Rowland Huey Edkins.

The new building was a two-storeyed timber structure, following the now standard layout for QATB centres. The ground floor contained the casualty room, office, store, and accommodation for the bearers (consisting of 2 bedrooms, an enclosed verandah which served as the living room, kitchen and toilet, shower and bathroom) and a cement floored area for housing the ambulance vehicles. On the upper floor was the superintendent's quarters, comprising 3 bedrooms, a study, kitchen, bathroom, shower and toilet and a large verandah, where all meals were taken.

The Ambulance Service was transferred to the Longreach Hospital in 1958, after which the upper floor of the ambulance station was occupied for some years as a residence, but the ground floor remained vacant. The building began to fall into disrepair and in 1971, Longreach citizens formed an Arts and Craft group and petitioned to make use of the disused ambulance building. In 1973, the ambulance reserve was transferred from the Health Department to local trustees as a Reserve for Cultural Purposes and the Longreach Cultural Association undertook to restore the former ambulance building as an arts and crafts centre. Assistance came from local Rotarians and from the Queensland and Australian governments in the form of grants for restoration work and various Arts grants.

The building now functions as an Arts and Crafts Centre and accommodates various art and craft classes, an art gallery, potters' workshop, Flying Arts activities, a theatre group, and community group meetings. The upper level currently comprises the Gallery, a flat rented on a semi-permanent basis, a Tutor's Room for visiting arts tutors, a store room, a craft display room, and a QATB memorabilia room. The Gallery was officially opened in November 1979.

An adjoining structure that houses the potters' group and the theatre group was constructed in 1988 as a bi-centennial project.

== Description ==
The former QATB centre is a two-storey timber-framed building with a corrugated iron roof. and has wide surrounding verandahs to both levels. The front of the building is clad with pressed metal sheeting which simulates bricks and stone quoins. This effect is heightened by appropriate painting. The sheeting is continued up into a parapet which conceals the roof from the street and carries the QATB Maltese cross insignia and the date 1921. The remainder of the building has exposed studs and a timber lining. The verandah to the upper floor has dowel balustrading and panels of lattice at the front corners and at the rear. There is a timber valance of vertical boards cut to form shallow arches between the timber post which support the verandah.

The building has been changed little to accommodate its new use and the extension building is connected only by a light pergola supporting vines.

== Heritage listing ==
The former QATB Centrewas listed on the Queensland Heritage Register on 21 October 1992 having satisfied the following criteria.

The place is important in demonstrating the evolution or pattern of Queensland's history.

The former QATB centre demonstrates the way in which the Queensland Ambulance Transport Brigade spread through Queensland and the importance of Longreach as a regional centre

The place is important in demonstrating the principal characteristics of a particular class of cultural places.

It is a good example of a regional QATB centre which uses the standard ambulance station plan comprising garage space, casualty room and bearer's room on the ground floor and accommodation for a superintendent above.

The place is important because of its aesthetic significance.

The former ambulance station, due to its prominent position in the main street of Longreach and its use of scale, form and materials, makes a major contribution to the townscape and is a well designed and proportioned building adapting a vernacular style well suited to the climate.

The place has a strong or special association with a particular community or cultural group for social, cultural or spiritual reasons.

The building has a strong association with the people of the Longreach area as a community facility and with the work of the Queensland Ambulance Transport Brigade.
