= Portland County, Queensland =

Division of Queensland, Australia

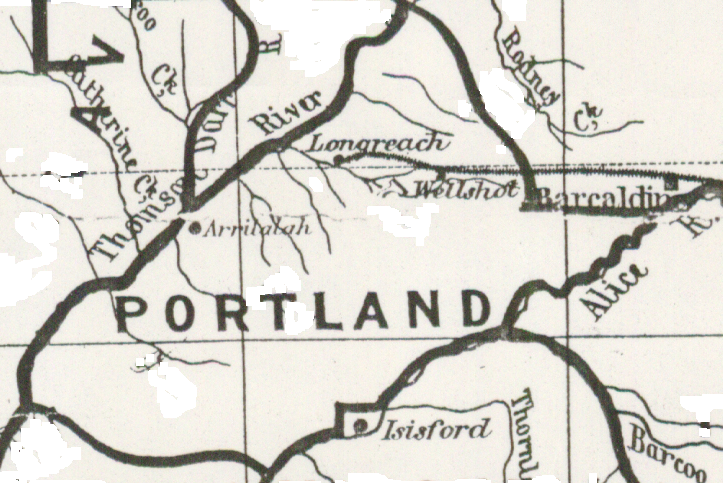
Portland County, Queensland in 1890

Portland County, Queensland is a cadastral division of Warrego Land District of Southern Queensland and a County of Queensland, Australia.

The county dates from colonial times but the current iteration dates from the 8th March 1901, when the Governor of Queensland issued a proclamation legally dividing all of Queensland into counties under the Land Act 1897. Like all counties in Queensland, it is a non-functional administrative unit, that is used mainly for the purpose of registering land titles. From 30 November 2015, the government no longer referenced counties and parishes in land information systems however the Museum of Lands, Mapping and Surveying retains a record for historical purposes.

The entire County is incorporated lands of the Shire of Longreach and the seat of local government and main town are at the railway terminus of Longreach, Queensland in the north of the county. Portland County lay on the traditional tribal lands of the Iningai. The main industries of the area are cattle, sheep, and, more recently, tourism.

== Climate ==
The county has a hot semi-arid climate (BSh) with extremely hot summers with warm nights and warm winters with cool nights. Rainfall is higher during summertime. Freezes have occurred a handful of times.
