= Tocal =

Tocal might refer to:

- Tocal, Queensland, a former rural locality in the Longreach Region, Queensland, Australia, now amalgamated into the locality of Longreach
- Tocal, New South Wales, a locality in the Hunter Valley near Maitland, in New South Wales, Australia
