= Camoola =

- Suburb
- Coordinates: 22.9436°S 144.3736°E
- Country: Australia
- State: Queensland
- LGA: Longreach Region

Government
  - State electorate: Gregory
  - Federal division: Maranoa

Population
  - Total: 29 (2016 census)
- Time zone: UTC+10:00 (AEST)
- Postcode: 4730
Suburbs around Camoola
Bangall	Tablederry	Muttaburra; Cornish Creek
Morella	Camoola	Sardine
Longreach	Longreach	Ilfracombe

Camoola was a rural locality within the Longreach Region, Queensland, Australia, situated between the towns of Longreach and Muttaburra. It has been amalgamated into the locality of Longreach.

== History ==
In the 2016 census, Camoola had a population of 29 people.

In January 2019, it was decided to reduce the number of localities within Longreach Region by amalgamating the localities to the north and west of the town of Longreach into the locality of Longreach. The localities amalgamated were: Camoola, Chorregon, Ernestina, Maneroo, Morella, Tocal, and Vergemont. As a consequence of this amalgamation, the Longreach Region has only three localities: Longreach, Ilfracombe and Isisford.
