= Darr River Downs =

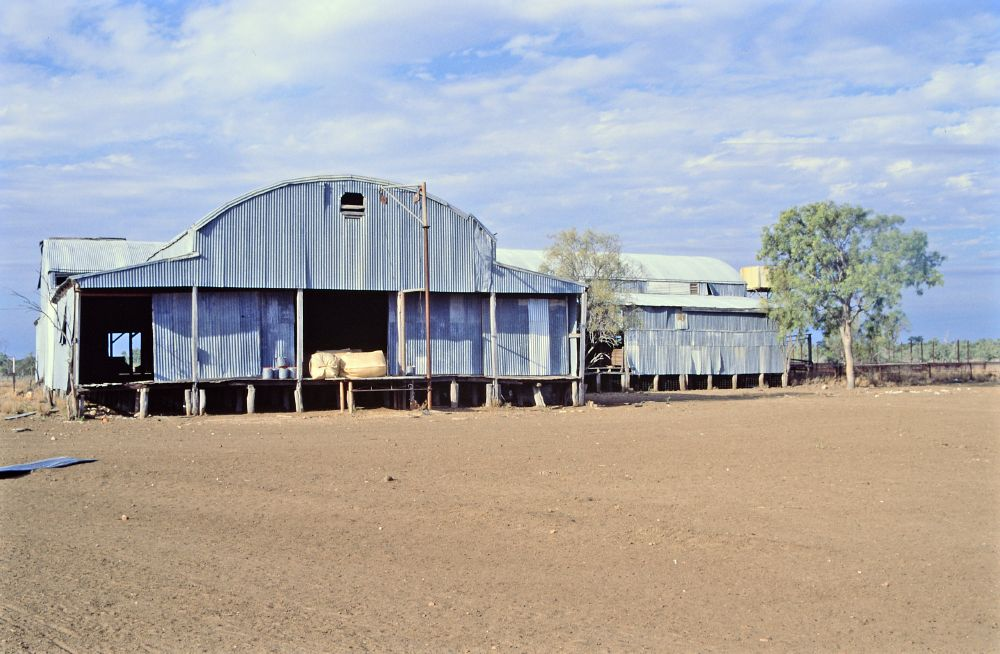
- Shearing shed at Darr River Downs Station, 1998

- Location within Queensland Location within Australia
- 22.8964°S 143.9821°E
- Location: Landsborough Highway, Morella, Longreach Region, Queensland, Australia

History
- Design period: 1870s–1890s (late 19th century)
- Built: 1870s circa – 1900s circa

Queensland Heritage Register
- Official name: Darr River Downs
- Type: state heritage (archaeological, built, landscape)
- Designated: 27 June 2003
- Reference no.: 600666
- Significant period: 1870s–1890s (historical); 1870s–1880s (fabric)
- Significant components: grave marker, stockyards, graveyard, shed – storage, machinery/plant/equipment – pastoralism, shearing shed/woolshed, store/s / storeroom / storehouse, wool scour, out building/s

Darr River Downs is a heritage-listed homestead at Landsborough Highway, Morella, Longreach Region, Queensland, Australia. It was built from 1870s circa to 1900s circa. It was added to the Queensland Heritage Register on 27 June 2003.

== History ==
The runs comprising Darr River Downs station were taken up during the early 1870s by a number of people, and were progressively acquired from 1876 by Baird, Rowan and Co., a group of Melbourne businessmen carrying on business together as sheep and cattle farmers. Although the Darr River Downs runs were recorded as being stocked with cattle initially, during the 1880s many of the newer pastoralists commenced raising sheep rather than cattle. Darr River Downs was consolidated during the late 1880s, and the lease taken up by Baird, Rowan and Co. The lease was transferred to William Taylor and Andrew Rowan, in partnership as Taylor, Rowan and Co, in 1888. Taylor and Rowan appear to have also been in partnership with Archibald Fisken and John Bertram, as in 1893, records indicate that the lease was transferred from Taylor, Rowan, Fisken and Bertram to the Trust and Agency Co. of Australasia. Rowan retired from the firm in 1897, and in August 1898, the lease again appears to have been held by Taylor, Fisken and Bertram. The lease was transferred to the Corporation of the Bank of Australasia later in 1898.

Darr River Downs, described in an advertisement in 1888 as a "First- class sheep station in Queensland...comprising about eleven hundred square miles, [704 000 acres]", was one of three large pastoral properties established in the district as a result of the consolidation of runs. The other two properties were Corona and Evesham.

A stone storehouse is understood to have been erected c. 1874 and used as the homestead on the station for some years, before a new stone homestead was erected. Other stone outbuildings were probably erected around this time. The stone for these buildings was quarried from the bed of the nearby Darr River.

Wool scouring developed as an alternative to sheep washing in Australia from the 1840s, and had almost replaced it by the 1890s. The Darr River Downs woolscour, reputedly the first to be erected in this part of Queensland, is thought to have been built during the early-mid 1880s. Construction of the scour has been attributed to the desire of the owners to overcome the difficulties involved in presenting buyers at the London wool sales with the cleanest possible wool. A document outlining the approximate cost of improvements on the Station suggests that the woolscour may have been erected in two stages, in 1883 and 1886, and it is recorded also that in 1886, Darr River Downs scoured its own wool for the first time. Darr River Downs was running approximately 135 550 sheep in 1890, and in 1893, the property recorded 1725 bales of wool.

The document outlining improvements to the station records also that a woolshed was erected on the property c. 1883. During the shearers' strike in 1891, a group of striking shearers unsuccessfully attempted to burn down the woolshed. A new woolshed appears to have been erected, possibly in the early 1900s, and is reputed to have formerly been a temporary pavilion/annexe for the c. 1880 Melbourne Exhibition, which was dismantled and shipped to Rockhampton, then transported to Darr River Downs where it was re-erected as the woolshed. An official record of the Melbourne International Exhibition of 1880–1881 noted that the temporary annexes erected for the Exhibition were constructed of corrugated iron and timber, and the materials were subsequently sold at fair prices to the Victorian Railway Department to be utilised in building shed & c at railway stations. It is not clear whether all of the annexes were sold to the Railways Department, or whether some may have been disposed of elsewhere. It is also of interest to note that an A Fisken (presumably Archibald Fisken, a prominent Melbourne businessman who was involved with Darr River Downs during the late 1890s) was listed in the Exhibition record as one of the Commissioners of the Exhibition, and therefore may have been involved in acquiring one of the annexes for Darr River Downs. The woolshed was located just over one mile from the homestead, and included large holding pens for the sheep, and shearers' quarters.

Records of the station buildings in 1904 refer to a complex of buildings including homestead, house kitchen, quarters, store, wheelwrights and carpenters shop, stables, and huts.

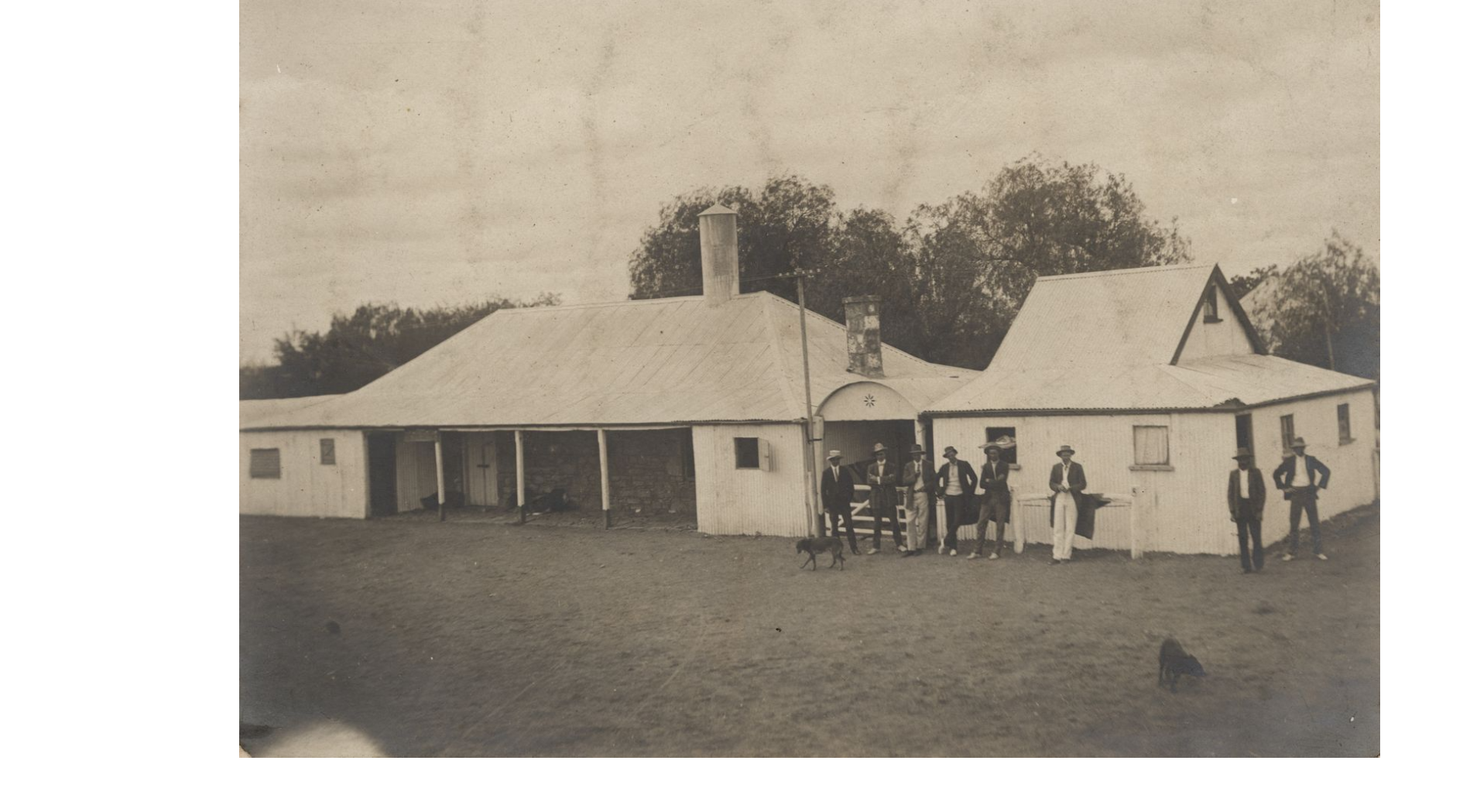
Quarters and store at Darr River Downs Station, Longreach in October 1910

In March 1910, the property was transferred to James Henry Coleman and Edward James Watt, of New Zealand, and was transferred into Watt's name in 1918. Watt was described as a generous employer, who, following the First World War, subdivided 60,000 acres (24,000 ha) from Darr River Downs, and gave it to four of the men who had worked on Darr River Downs and returned from the War.

Watt died in 1942, and Darr River Downs passed to Thomas Coleman Lowry, Watt's nephew, in 1950. Following Lowry's death in the mid 1970s, the property passed to Lowry's son and other members of the Lowry family. The property was acquired by the present owners in 1989. The portion of land on which the homestead and outbuildings, including the woolshed and woolscour ruins are located presently comprises 51,564 acres (20,867 ha).

The woolshed, formerly crucifix-shaped in plan, has been partially dismantled and sections of the building re-erected on other properties in the area. The woolshed is still in use by Darr River Downs and other properties in the district. The homestead was extensively renovated c. 1987.

== Description ==
Darr River Downs, located to the west of Darr River northeast of Morella, consists of a homestead, office and saddle room, store, woolshed, woolscour ruins and cemetery.

The homestead has been substantially altered, although parts of the original internal and external walls and paving stones around the exterior have been retained. All early internal joinery and linings have been removed. The homestead building is not considered to be of cultural heritage significance.

The office and saddle room, a single-storeyed structure with a hipped corrugated iron roof and verandahs all round, is constructed of rough-squared field stone with clay mortar. Verandahs have tree trunk verandah posts and earth floors.

The store, a single-storeyed structure with a hipped corrugated iron roof and verandahs all round, is constructed of field stone with clay mortar. Internally, the building has stone paved floors and the roof is unlined.

The woolshed, located approximately two kilometres to the east of the homestead complex, is a corrugated iron clad structure with timber stumps and consists of arched metal trusses over a T-shaped plan. Internally, the building has timber floors, timber fencing and gates and evidence of early shearing equipment.

The woolscour ruins are located to the north of the homestead complex.

The cemetery, to the south of the homestead complex, is surrounded by a timber post and rail fence and contains two graves with headstones and metal surrounds.

== Heritage listing ==
Darr River Downs was listed on the Queensland Heritage Register on 27 June 2003 having satisfied the following criteria.

The place is important in demonstrating the evolution or pattern of Queensland's history.

Established in the early 1870s, Darr River Downs is important in demonstrating the evolution of the pastoral industry in Queensland.

The place demonstrates rare, uncommon or endangered aspects of Queensland's cultural heritage.

The construction and layout of the woolshed, with the use of prefabricated arched metal trusses is rare and uncommon. The woolscour ruins (c. 1886) are a rare example of an early use of new technology which even by the late nineteenth century was only common in regional centres.

The place has potential to yield information that will contribute to an understanding of Queensland's history.

The surviving 19th and early 20th-century structures have the potential to contribute to an understanding of building technology and wool processing in western Queensland.

The place is important in demonstrating the principal characteristics of a particular class of cultural places.

Darr River Downs demonstrates the principal characteristics of a late nineteenth century/early twentieth century pastoral station by the layout, materials, scale and design.

The place is important because of its aesthetic significance.

Darr River Downs demonstrates the principal characteristics of a late nineteenth century/early twentieth century pastoral station by the layout, materials, scale and design. Together with mature plantings, these elements contribute to the aesthetic significance of the place.

The place is important in demonstrating a high degree of creative or technical achievement at a particular period.

The woolshed and woolscour remains also demonstrate a high degree of technical achievement for the period, through the early use of mechanical wool washing techniques and metal truss construction.
