= Chorregon =

Chorregon Queensland
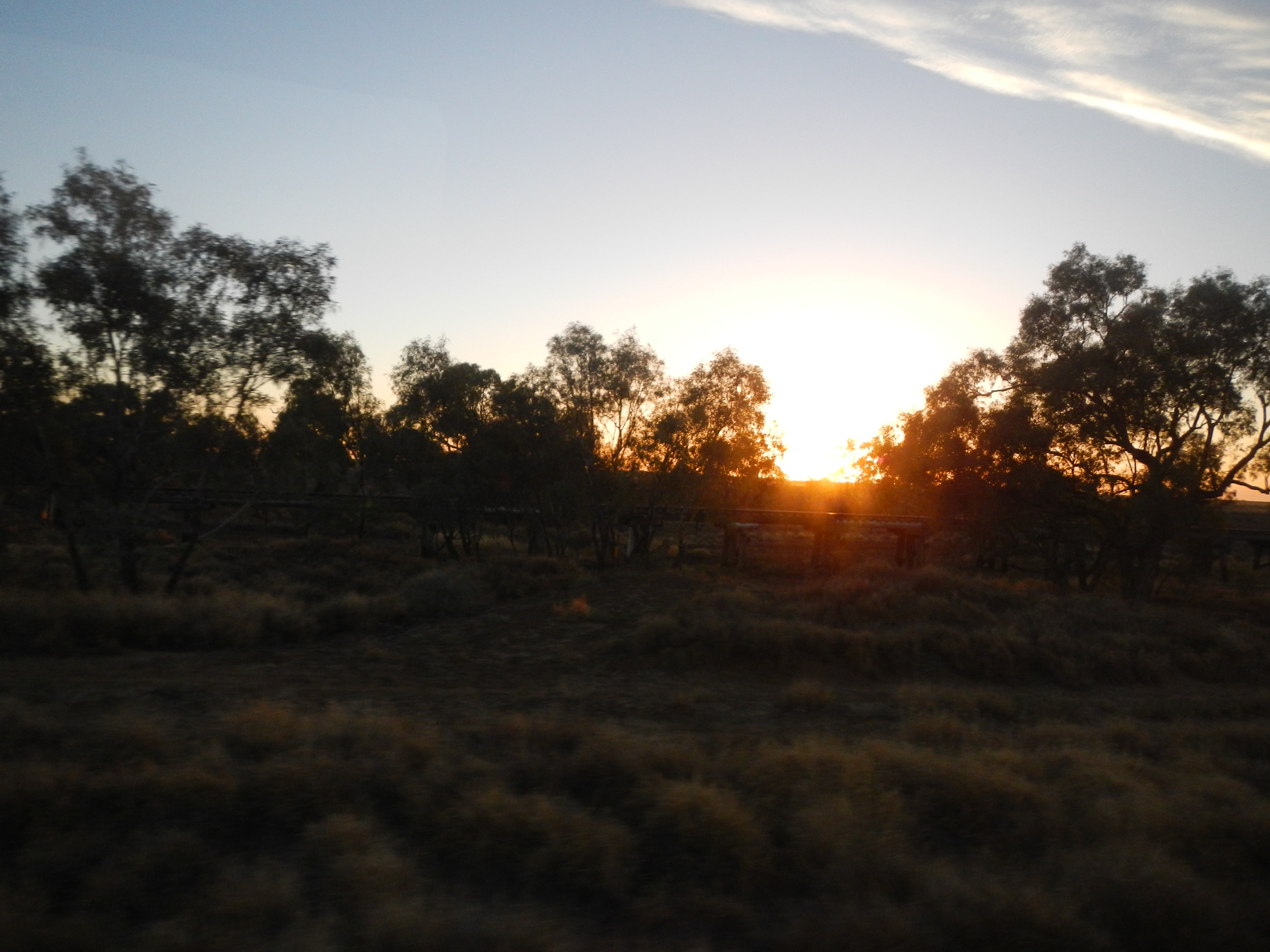
- Sunrise on the Landsborough Highway

- Coordinates: 22.7283°S 143.6199°E
- Population: 57 (2016 census)
- Postcode(s): 4730
- Time zone: AEST (UTC+10:00)
- LGA(s): Longreach Region
- State electorate(s): Gregory
- Federal division(s): Maranoa
Suburbs around Chorregon:
Corfield	Corfield	Bangall
Opalton	Chorregon	Morella
Vergemont	Morella	Morella

Chorregon was a rural locality in the Longreach Region, Queensland, Australia. Its name is reportedly derived from an Aboriginal word, language and dialect unknown, indicating wallaby. It is now part of the locality of Longreach.

== History ==
In the 2016 census, Chorregon had a population of 57 people.

In January 2019, it was decided to reduce the number of localities within Longreach Region by amalgamating the localities to the north and west of the town of Longreach into the locality of Longreach. The localities amalgamated were: Camoola, Chorregon, Ernestina, Maneroo, Morella, Tocal, and Vergemont. As a consequence of this amalgamation, the Longreach Region has only three localities: Longreach, Ilframcombe and Isisford.
