= Ernestina, Queensland =

Ernestina Queensland
- Coordinates: 23.7305°S 143.9388°E
- Population: 16 (2016 census)
- Time zone: AEST (UTC+10:00)
- LGA(s): Longreach Region
- State electorate(s): Gregory
- Federal division(s): Maranoa
Suburbs around Ernestina:
Maneroo	Maneroo	Longreach
Maneroo	Ernestina	Ilfracombe
Tocal	Ilfracombe	Ilfracombe

Ernestina was a rural locality in the Longreach Region, Queensland, Australia. It is now part of Longreach.

== History ==
In the 2016 census, Ernestina had a population of 16 people. In January 2019, it was decided to reduce the number of localities within Longreach Region by amalgamating the localities to the north and west of the town of Longreach into the locality of Longreach. The localities amalgamated were: Camoola, Chorregon, Ernestina, Maneroo, Morella, Tocal, and Vergemont. As a consequence of this amalgamation, the Longreach Region has only three localities: Longreach, Ilframcombe and Isisford.
