= Morella, Queensland =

Morella Queensland
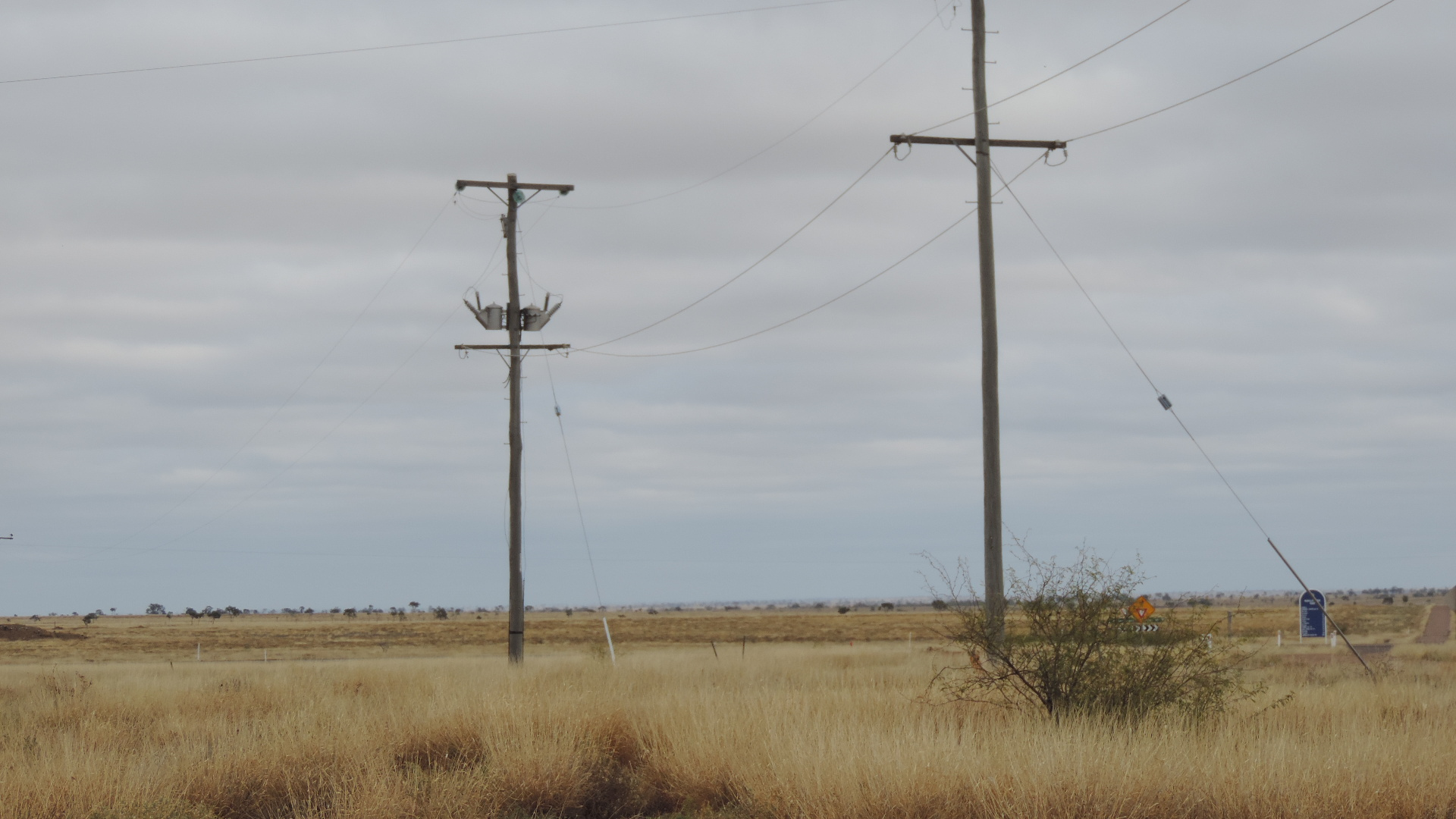
- Landscape, 2019

- Coordinates: 22.9980°S 143.8550°E
- Population: 33 (2016 census)
- Postcode(s): 4730
- Time zone: AEST (UTC+10:00)
- Location: 84.6 km (53 mi) NW of Longreach; 770 km (478 mi) W of Rockhampton; 1,261 km (784 mi) NW of Brisbane
- LGA(s): Longreach Region
- State electorate(s): Gregory
- Federal division(s): Maranoa
Suburbs around Morella:
| Chorregon | Chorregon | Bangall |
| Vergemont | Morella | Camoola |
| Maneroo | Maneroo | Longreach |

Morella was a rural locality within Longreach Region, Queensland, Australia. Since January 2019, it has been amalgamated into the locality of Longreach.

== Geography ==
The Landsborough Highway passed from south-east to north-west through the locality.

== History ==
Morella railway station (22.9823°S 143.8682°E) on the Central Western railway line was named by the Queensland Railways Department on 7 August 1925. It is an Aboriginal word meaning small hill.

Morella Post Office opened on 1 July 1927 and closed in 1979.

Town lots were sold in November 1948 centred on 22.9812°S 143.8683°E.

Local women formed the Morella branch of the Queensland Country Women's Association in October 1944. Initially they met at the Hereward and Tandara homesteads. About September 1951 they opened their own hall (22.9805°S 143.8676°E).

Evesham State School opened on 23 January 1967. It was mothballed on 31 December 2009 and then permanently closed on 31 December 2010. The school was on Silsoe Road. The school's website was archived.

In the 2016 census, Morella had a population of 33 people.

In January 2019, it was decided to reduce the number of localities within Longreach Region by amalgamating the localities to the north and west of the town of Longreach into the locality of Longreach. The localities amalgamated were: Camoola, Chorregon, Ernestina, Maneroo, Morella, Tocal, and Vergemont. As a consequence of this amalgamation, the Longreach Region has only three localities: Longreach, Ilframcombe and Isisford.

== Heritage listings ==
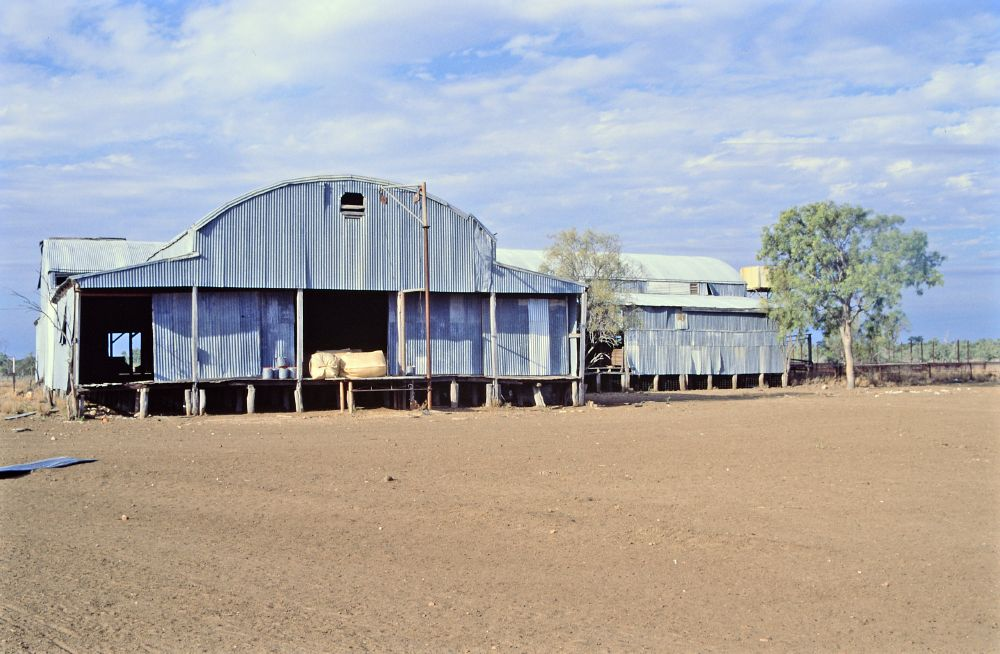
Darr River Downs woolshed, 1998

Morella had a number of heritage-listed sites, including:

- Darr River Downs; Landsborough Highway (22.8964°S 143.9821°E)

== Amenities ==
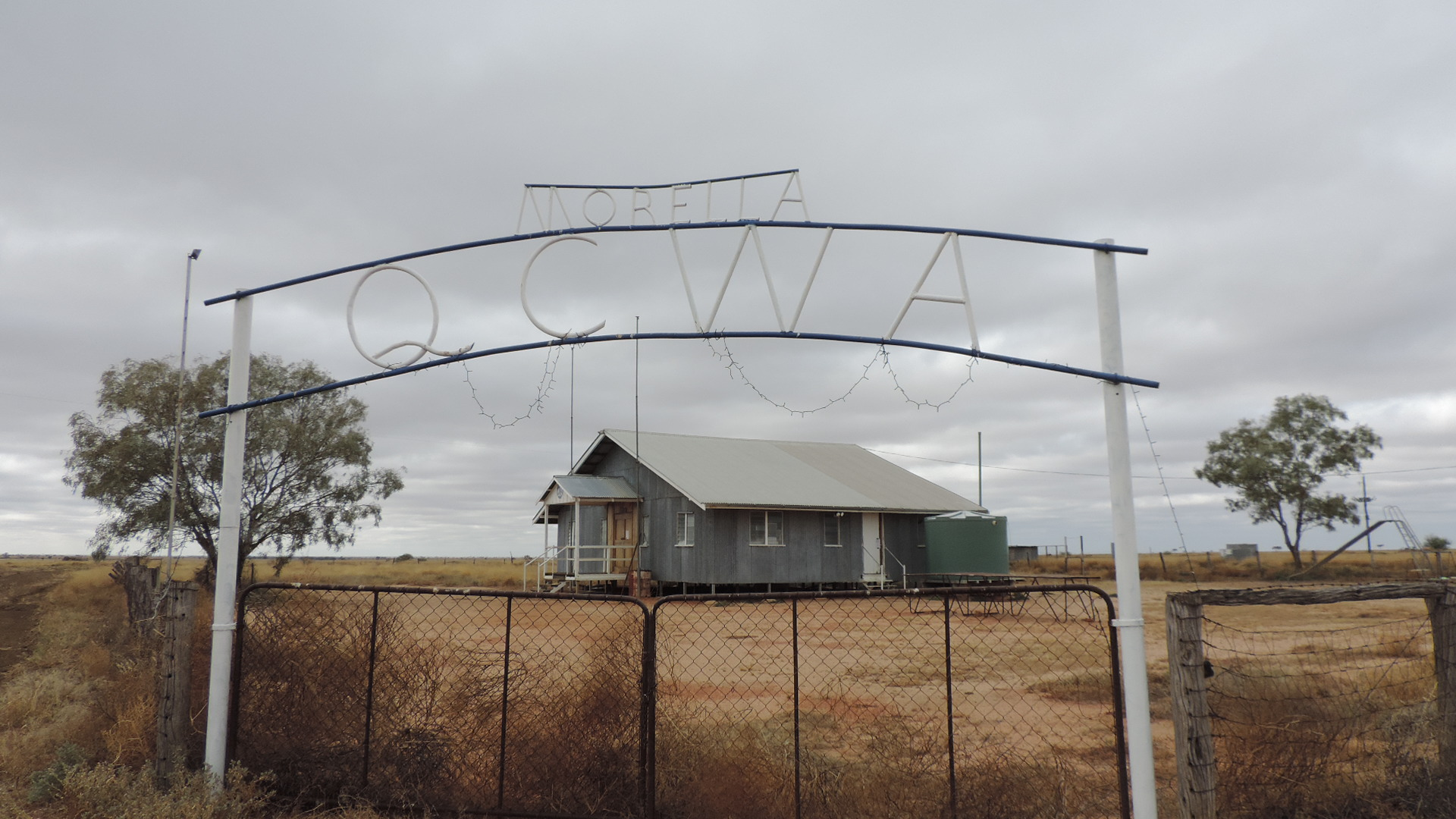
Queensland Country Women's Association hall, Morella, 2019

There was a branch of the Queensland Country Women's Association in Morella off Morella Road (22.9805°S 143.8674°E).
