= Lochern National Park =

National park in Australia

- IUCN category II (national park)
- Location within Queensland
- Location: Queensland
- Nearest city: Longreach
- Coordinates: 24°14′14″S 143°19′33″E
- Area: 239.93 km^{2} (92.64 sq mi)
- Established: 1994
- Governing body: Queensland Parks and Wildlife Service

Lochern is a national park in Longreach, Central West Queensland, Australia, 1,047 km west of Brisbane. Eastern parts of the national park are interspersed with numerous channels of the Thomson River. The park is sprawled over an area of 24,300 hectares. This area forms important habitats for numerous species. Several lagoons and waterholes within the park provide important refuges for birds and other wildlife.

== History ==
The diverse climate of Lochern was a boon for the Aboriginal people, who learned to utilize the dry and wet spells. They adapted to the seasonal transformation of land, reaping its bounties. Rainwater harvesting with the help of dams was done by pastoralists in the area.

== Camping ==
Camping facilities are available at the park. The park's camping site, which is located some 5 kilometres (3.1 mi) from the park's eastern limit, is surrounded by mulga and gidgee woodlands. The camping area is accessible on vehicles, although the dirt road can be sometimes hard to tackle for normal vehicles. Hence, four-wheel drive is a better option. The park is notorious for abrupt weather changes. Minor showers can often lead to floods, irrespective of the time of year.

== See also ==
- Protected areas of Queensland
