= Shire of Ilfracombe =

- Local government area
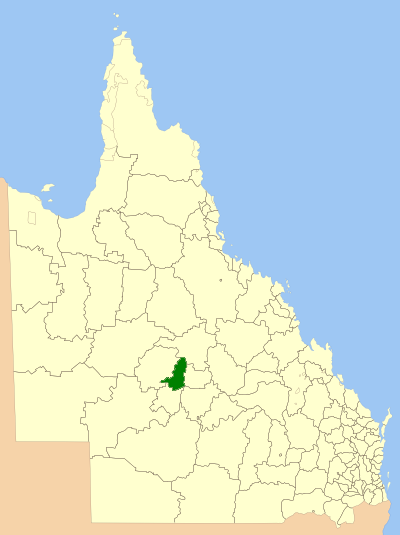
- Location within Queensland

- Country: Australia
- State: Queensland
- Council seat: Ilfracombe

Area
  - Total: 6,575.5 km^{2} (2,538.8 sq mi)

Population
  - Total: 279 (2006 census)
  - Density: 0.04243/km^{2} (0.10989/sq mi)
LGAs around Shire of Ilfracombe
Longreach	Aramac	Aramac
Longreach	Shire of Ilfracombe	Barcaldine
Longreach	Isisford	Isisford

The Shire of Ilfracombe was a local government area located in central western Queensland, between the towns of Longreach and Barcaldine. Administered from the town of Ilfracombe, it covered an area of 6,575.5 square kilometres (2,538.8 sq mi), and existed as a local government entity from 1902 until 2008, when it amalgamated with the Shires of Isisford and Longreach to form the Longreach Region.

The region formerly located within the shire contains many large cattle and sheep stations. By population, it was one of the smallest local government areas in Queensland.

== History ==
The Aramac Division was created on 11 November 1879 as one of 74 divisions around Queensland under the Divisional Boards Act 1879. On 27 December 1902, part of the Aramac Division was excised to create the Ilfracombe Division under the Divisional Boards Act 1887.

With the passage of the Local Authorities Act 1902, Ilfracombe Division became the Shire of Ilfracombe on 31 March 1903.

On 15 March 2008, under the Local Government (Reform Implementation) Act 2007 passed by the Parliament of Queensland on 10 August 2007, the Shire of Ilfracombe merged with the Shires of Isisford and Longreach to form the Longreach Region.

== Towns and localities ==
The Shire of Ilfracombe included the following settlement:

- Ilfracombe (pop. 170)

== Chairmen ==
- 1927: A. Howatson

== Population ==
Year	Population
1933	642
1947	450
1954	544
1961	653
1966	660
1971	389
1976	428
1981	460
1986	327
1991	344
1996	333
2001	356
2006	279
