= Vergemont, Queensland =

Vergemont Queensland
- Coordinates: 23.5533°S 143.1919°E
- Population: 26 (2016 census)
- Postcode(s): 4730
- Time zone: AEST (UTC+10:00)
- LGA(s): Longreach Region
- State electorate(s): Gregory
- Federal division(s): Maranoa
Suburbs around Vergemont:
Opalton	Chorregon	Morella
Opalton	Vergemont	Maneroo
Stonehenge	Tocal	Tocal

Vergemont is a former rural locality in the Longreach Region, Queensland, Australia. It was amalgamated into the locality of Longreach.

== Geography ==
The locality included the Lochern National Park in its southernmost section.

== History ==
In the 2016 census, Vergemont had a population of 26 people.

In January 2019, it was decided to reduce the number of localities within Longreach Region by amalgamating the localities to the north and west of the town of Longreach into the locality of Longreach. The localities amalgamated were: Camoola, Chorregon, Ernestina, Maneroo, Morella, Tocal, and Vergemont. As a consequence of this amalgamation, the Longreach Region has just three localities: Longreach, Ilframcombe and Isisford.
