= Shire of Isisford =

- Local government area
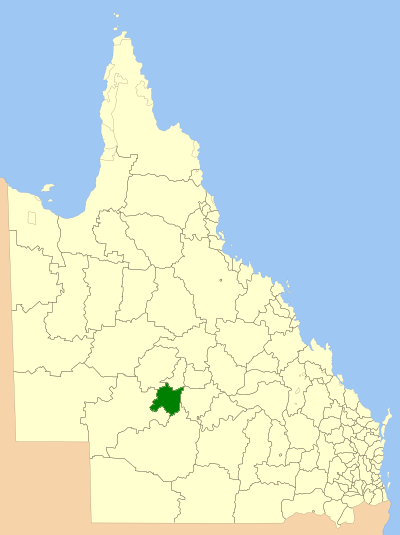
- Location within Queensland

- Country: Australia
- State: Queensland
- Established: 1908
- Council seat: Isisford

Area
  - Total: 10,482.6 km^{2} (4,047.4 sq mi)

Population
  - Total: 347 (2006 census)
  - Density: 0.03310/km^{2} (0.08574/sq mi)
LGAs around Shire of Isisford
Longreach	Ilfracombe	Ilfracombe
Barcoo	Shire of Isisford	Blackall
Barcoo	Barcoo	Quilpie

The Shire of Isisford was a local government area located in central western Queensland, between the towns of Longreach and Blackall. It covered an area of 10,482.6 square kilometres (4,047.4 sq mi), and existed as a local government entity from 1908 until 2008, when it amalgamated with the Shires of Ilfracombe and Longreach to form the Longreach Region.

The region formerly located within the shire contains many large cattle and sheep stations.

== History ==
The Shire of Isisford was created on 1 January 1908 under the Local Authorities Act 1902, having been separated from the Shire of Barcoo. On 15 March 2008, under the Local Government (Reform Implementation) Act 2007 passed by the Parliament of Queensland on 10 August 2007, the Shire of Isisford merged with the Shires of Ilfracombe and Longreach to form the Longreach Region.

== Towns and localities ==
The Shire of Isisford included the following settlements:

- Isisford
- Emmet
- Yaraka

== Population ==
Year	Population
1933	873
1947	657
1954	807
1961	867
1966	747
1971	453
1976	431
1981	605
1986	465
1991	440
1996	302
2001	313
2006	347

== Chairmen ==
- 1919: F. J. C. Coxon
- 1927: J. J. Dowie
