= Longreach, Queensland =

Longreach
- Town
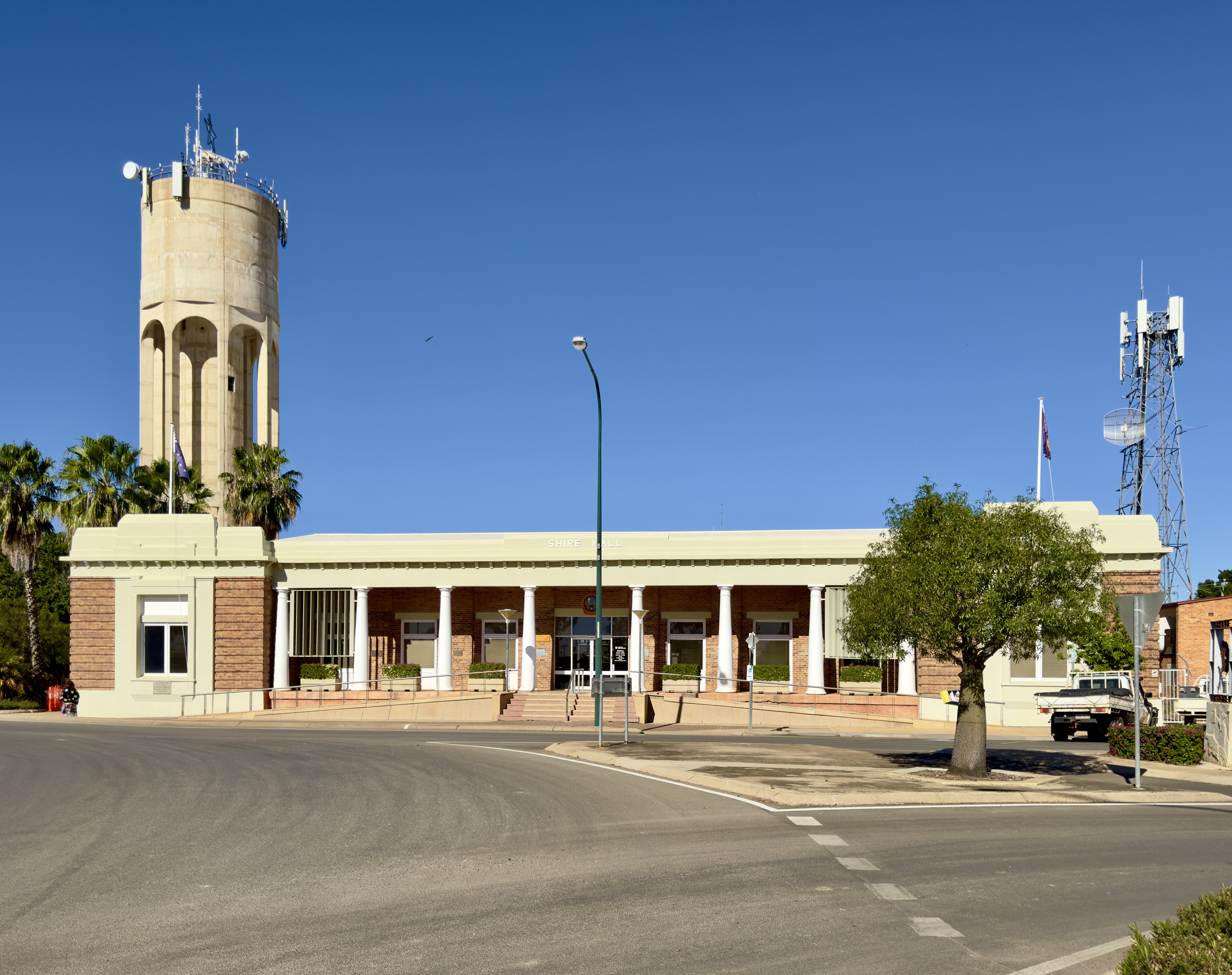
- Longreach Shire Hall and Water Tower

- Interactive map of Longreach
- Coordinates: 23.4422°S 144.2491°E
- Country: Australia
- State: Queensland
- LGA: Longreach Region
- Location: 647 km (402 mi) SE of Mount Isa; 687 km (427 mi) W of Rockhampton; 1,178 km (732 mi) NW of Brisbane
- Established: 1888

Government
  - State electorate: Gregory
  - Federal division: Maranoa

Area
  - Total: 23,492.3 km^{2} (9,070.4 sq mi)
- Elevation: 191.0 m (626.6 ft)

Population
  - Total: 3,124 (2021 census)
  - Density: 0.132980/km^{2} (0.34442/sq mi)
- Time zone: UTC+10:00 (AEST)
- Postcode: 4730
- County: Portland County
- Mean max temp: 31.4 °C (88.5 °F)
- Mean min temp: 15.8 °C (60.4 °F)
- Annual rainfall: 441.4 mm (17.38 in)
Localities around Longreach
Corfield	Bangall; Tablederry	Muttaburra; Cornish Creek
Opalton	Longreach	Sardine
Stonehenge	Isisford	Ilfracombe

Longreach is a rural town and locality in the Longreach Region, Queensland, Australia. It is the administrative centre of the Longreach Regional Council, which was established in 2008 as a merger of the former Longreach, Ilfracombe, and Isisford shires. Longreach is a tourist destination due to its museums. In the 2021 census, the locality of Longreach had a population of 3,124 people.

== Geography ==
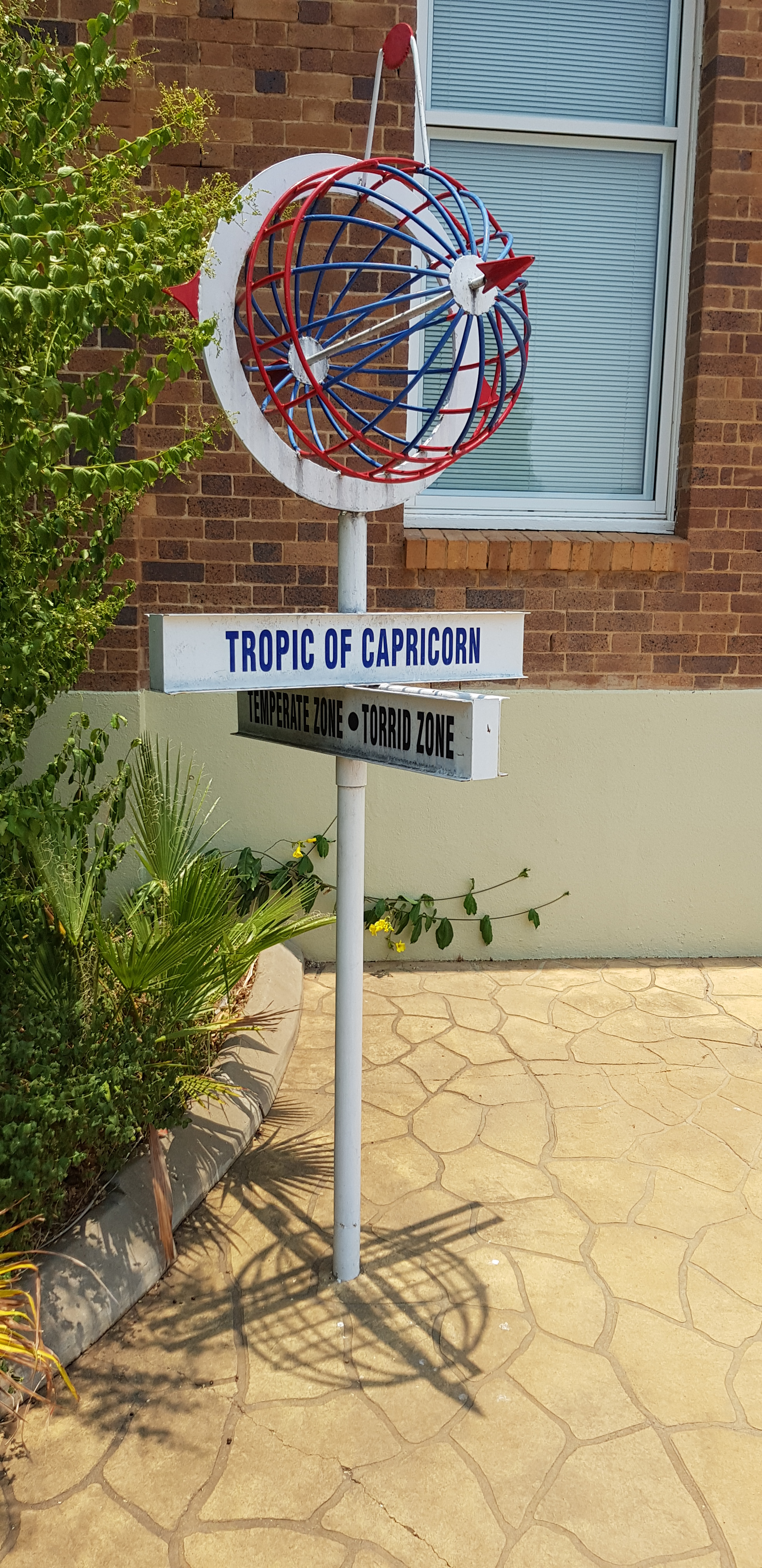
Near Civic Centre, Longreach, at mid-day of summer solstice 2019. The monument is a few arc seconds south of Tropic of Capricorn. (See shadow directly below the sign.)

Longreach is in Central West Queensland, approximately 700 km (430 mi) from the coast, west of Rockhampton. The town is on the Tropic of Capricorn in the south-east of the locality. The town is named after the ‘long reach’ of the Thomson River on which it is situated.

Lochern National Park is in the south-western part of the locality (formerly in Vergemont).

The main industries of the area are cattle, sheep, and, more recently, tourism.

The Landsborough Highway enters the locality from the south-east (Ilfracombe), passes through the town and then exits to the north-west (Corfield). The Central Western railway line takes the same route, the town being served by the Longreach railway station. The Thomson Developmental Road commences at the town and passes through the south-east of the locality (briefly passing through the westernmost part of Ilfracombe) before exiting to the south (Stonehenge).

In Longreach, the streets are named after species of birds, with the streets running east–west named after water birds and those running north–south after land birds. The main business street is called Eagle Street. Other streets honour Hudson Fysh, an Australian aviation pioneer, and Sir James Walker, a farmer and long-serving mayor of the former Longreach Shire Council.

== History ==
Longreach lies within the traditional tribal lands of the Iningai people. Iningai (also known as Yiningay, Muttaburra, Tateburra, Yinangay, Yinangi) is an Australian Aboriginal language spoken by the Iningai people. The Iningai language region includes the landscape within the local government boundaries of the Longreach Region, particularly the towns of Longreach, Barcaldine, Muttaburra and Aramac as well as the properties of Bowen Downs and catchments of Cornish Creek and Alice River.

Kuungkari (also known as Kungkari and Koonkerri) is a language of Western Queensland. The Kuungkari language region includes the landscape within the local government boundaries of Longreach Shire Council and Blackall-Tambo Shire Council.

The first Europeans to enter the area were part of the expedition led by William Landsborough in 1862. This party initially tried to intimidate the resident Iningai by galloping their horses at them and shooting over their heads, but the Iningai were undeterred. Through an Aboriginal Native Police trooper named Jemmy who accompanied Landsborough and spoke the Iningai language, they were able to communicate with the Iningai and were told the geography of the region and shown the best roads to travel by. An Iningai man named Wittin acted as their guide.

In 1862, the enormous Bowen Downs cattle station was established across the region by William Landsborough, Nathaniel Buchanan and Edward Cornish, with the financial backing of Robert Morehead and Matthew Young of the Scottish Australian Investment Company. In 1872, Bowen Downs was divided into two huge properties, the section along the Thomson River being named Mount Cornish, managed by Edward R. Edkins. An outstation of this Mount Cornish cattle station was called Longreach, because it was situated on a long reach of the Thomson River. This location later developed into the township of Longreach.

From its inception, Longreach had a sizable Asian population. The Chinese conducted business as bakers, general merchants, conducted a laundry and provided locally caught fish for sale. They were generally remembered as the main suppliers of vegetables and other garden produce up until and during the Second World War. The gardens were located at Thomson River and Gin Creek but were not as profitable as they could have been due to the regularity of grasshopper plagues harvesting the crops. This forced many gardeners to abandon their gardens and by the 1940's the Chinese residents no longer concentrated on market garden for their livelihood. The majority of the Chinese community not involved in gardening lived and worked at the lower end of Eagle Street. The Chinese sector of the town was reduced to ash by fire in 1934 when a fire that started in the Leichhardt Hotel swept through the entire block of buildings.

The town of Longreach was gazetted in 1887, and its post office opened on 1 October 1891. The Central Western railway line reached the town on 15 February 1892, causing the population to grow. (The selection of the newer town of Longreach as the terminus led to the demise of the older Arrilalah township to the south.) Longreach State School opened on 22 May 1893 with an enrolment of 102 students, and the Presentation Sisters founded a primary school in 1900 that became Our Ladies' College. In 1920 Qantas was formed making a big start to the little town. St Joseph's Primary School was established in 1925. In 1935 Our Ladies' College expanded to offer secondary education to Year 10, becoming the first secondary school in Central Western Queensland.

Cominos Brothers opened a cafe in Eagle Street, the town's main street in 1911. The cafe was known as Comino Bros. Central Café and American Bar, probably because it had an American-style soda fountain.

Longreach Rail Post Office opened by April 1940 and closed in 1962.

Longreach State High School opened on 24 January 1966.

Evesham State School opened in the former Morella on 23 January 1967. It was mothballed on 31 December 2009 and then permanently closed on 31 December 2010.

In 1970, Queen Elizabeth II, The Duke of Edinburgh and Her Royal Highness Princess Anne toured Australia including Queensland. The Queensland tour began on Sunday 12 April when the royal yacht Britannia entered Moreton Bay at Caloundra, sailing into Newstead Wharf. After several days of engagements in the city of Brisbane, Queen Elizabeth II and The Duke of Edinburgh commenced their regional tour flying to Longreach on Wednesday 15 April. The primary purpose for their stopover in Longreach was to visit the first operational base of Queensland’s first airline, Qantas, which became Australia’s Overseas Airline. During the visit they viewed an exhibition of Qantas memorabilia, including a replica of the company’s first aircraft, the AVRO 504K of 1921. The occasion marked the 50th anniversary of the founding of The Queensland and Northern Territory Aerial Services, Limited (Qantas). Qantas Airways celebrated its centenary in 2020.

On 1 January 1986, Our Ladies' College relocated to the St Joseph's site. A pre-school was added in 1992. It returned to being only a primary school (P–6) at the end of 1994. In 2002, the school changed its name to Our Ladies' School.

Longreach School of Distance Education (also known as Longreach School of the Air) opened on 27 January 1987.

In early April 2010, Longreach experienced a significant locust plague described by local residents as the worst in three decades.

In January 2019, it was decided to reduce the number of localities within Longreach Region by amalgamating the localities to the north and west of the town of Longreach into the locality of Longreach. The localities amalgamated were: Camoola, Chorregon, Ernestina, Maneroo, Morella, Tocal, and Vergemont. As a consequence of this amalgamation, the Longreach Region has only three localities: Longreach, Ilfracombe and Isisford.

== Demographics ==
In the 2011 census, the town of Longreach had a population of 3,137 people.

In the 2016 census, the locality of Longreach had a population of 2,970 people.

In the 2021 census, the locality of Longreach had a population of 3,124 people.

== Heritage listings ==
Longreach has a number of heritage-listed sites, including:

- Longreach railway station, Capricorn Highway (23.4401°S 144.2523°E)
- Longreach Ambulance Centre, 111 Ibis Street (23.4401°S 144.2461°E)
- Qantas Hangar, Landsborough Highway (23.4395°S 144.2708°E)
- Darr River Downs, Landsborough Highway (formerly in Morella, 22.8964°S 143.9821°E)
- former Longreach Powerhouse, 12 Swan Street (23.4404°S 144.2455°E)

== Economy ==
4.9% of the population works in beef cattle farming compared to 0.7 per cent nationally.

== Facilities ==
Longreach has a visitor information centre, swimming pool, Powerhouse Museum and parks. Shopping facilities in the town include IGA, FoodWorks and Prices Plus. As part of nationwide restructuring, Target Country closed its store on Eagle Street in April 2021.

Longreach Regional Council operates the Longreach Library at 106 Eagle Street.

The Longreach branch of the Queensland Country Women's Association has its rooms in Duck Street. There is also a branch of the Queensland Country Women's Association in the former Morella (now part of Longreach).

Until 2021, Longreach had a local cinema. Star Cinema Longreach operated for 33 years before closing due to a combination of the COVID-19 pandemic and the rise in popularity of streaming services. Prior to the construction of the modern Star Cinema in 1988, films were shown at the Roxy Theatre which was rebuilt and reopened in 1953 after a fire destroyed the original premises in 1952 forcing films to be temporarily screened in the shire hall.

== Education ==
Longreach State School is a government primary (Early Childhood to Year 6) school for boys and girls at 125 Ibis Street (23.4413°S 144.2454°E). In 2017, the school had an enrolment of 197 students with 19 teachers (18 full-time equivalent) and 17 non-teaching staff (12 full-time equivalent).

Longreach State High School is a government secondary (7–12) school for boys and girls at Jabiru Street (23.4382°S 144.2619°E). In 2017, the school had an enrolment of 179 students with 24 teachers (22 full-time equivalent) and 16 non-teaching staff (10 full-time equivalent).

Longreach School of Distance Education is a government primary and secondary (Early Childhood to Year 10) school for boys and girls at Sir James Walker Drive (23.4413°S 144.2825°E). In 2017, the school had an enrolment of 181 students with 28 teachers (24 full-time equivalent) and 15 non-teaching staff (11 full-time equivalent).

Longreach State School Special Education Program is a primary and secondary (Early Childhood to Year 12) special education program at Longreach State School at Kingfisher Street (23.4408°S 144.2442°E).

Our Lady's Catholic Primary School is a Catholic primary (Preparatory to Year 6) school for boys and girls at 85 Eagle Street (23.4394°S 144.2511°E). In 2017, the school had an enrolment of 91 students with 10 teachers (9 full-time equivalent) and 7 non-teaching staff (4 full-time equivalent).

The town is home to the Australian Agricultural College's Longreach Campus, which prepares students for work in the agricultural and pastoral industries. It was known previously as the Longreach Pastoral College. The campus was opened in 1967. Adjacent to the college is the Longreach School of Distance Education, which provides lessons to remote students, formerly by HF radio but now using telephone lines. The agricultural college in Longreach closed December 2019.

== Media ==
The Longreach Leader newspaper is issued weekly.

ABC Western Queensland, a part of the ABC Local Radio network, broadcasts from studios on Duck Street in the town.

== Attractions ==
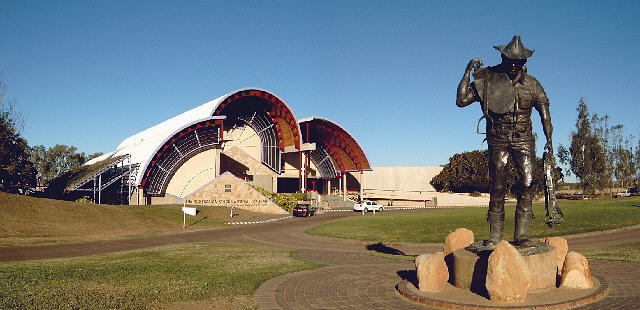
Australian Stockman's Hall of Fame in Longreach

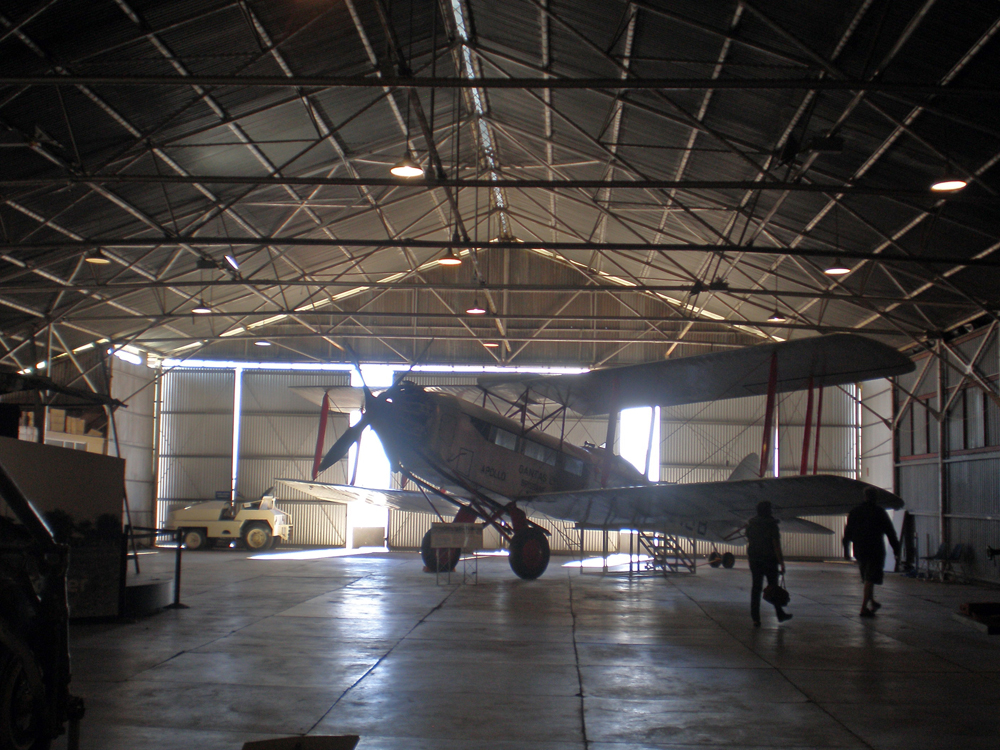
The world's third oldest airline, Qantas, commenced operating in Longreach – from this hangar – now part of the Qantas Founders Museum.

Longreach is the home of the Australian Stockman's Hall of Fame, which was officially opened in 1988 by Queen Elizabeth II. The purpose of the centre is to showcase the history and the culture of life in rural Australia. Since its opening, over 3 million people have visited.

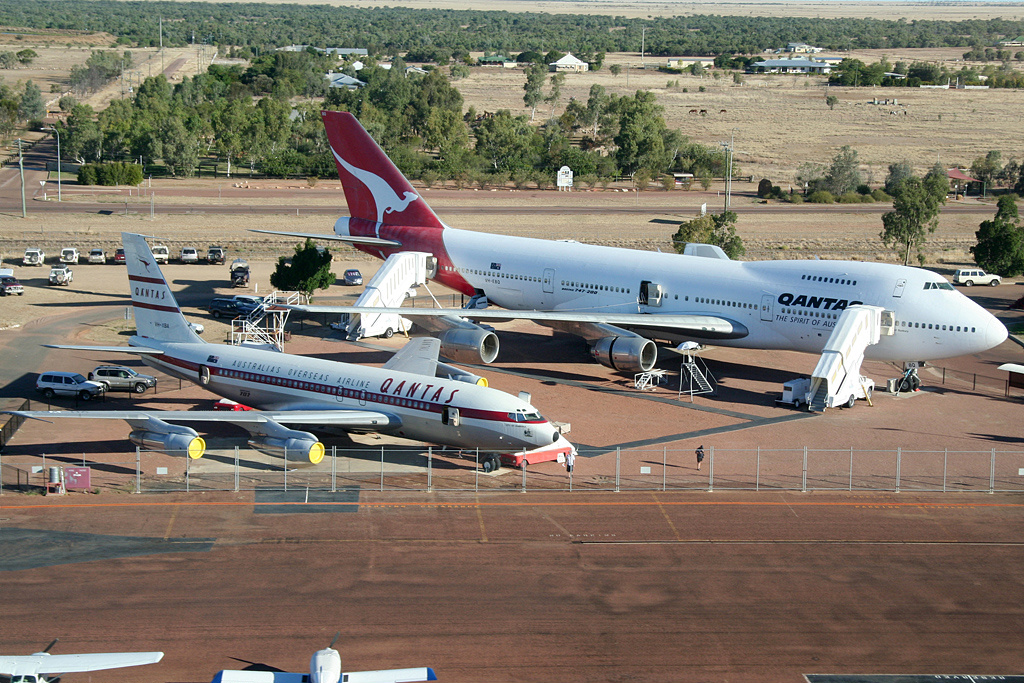
Qantas Founders Museum

Longreach was one of the founding centres for Qantas, the Australian domestic and international airline, the third oldest airline in the world (after KLM and Avianca), being founded on 16 November 1920 in Winton. One of the airline's original hangars remains in use at the Longreach Airport and is listed on the Australian National Heritage List. The town is now the home of the Qantas Founders Museum, which includes amongst its displays a decommissioned Qantas Boeing 747-200 aircraft, registration VH-EBQ, The City of Bunbury, and Qantas's first jet aircraft VH-XBA (formerly VH-EBA), a Boeing 707, The City of Canberra.

== Notable residents ==
Notable residents of Longreach include:

- Carl Barron, stand-up comedian, born in Longreach
- Lobby Loyde, guitarist in the Purple Hearts and Coloured Balls, born in Longreach
- Bruce Saunders, Member of the Queensland Legislative Assembly, born in Longreach
- Matthew Scott, rugby league footballer, born in Longreach
- Edgar Towner, Victoria Cross winner, died in Longreach and was buried in the cemetery there. His grave is a protected place.

== Climate ==
Longreach experiences a hot semi-arid climate (Köppen: BSh), with very hot summers and very mild winters, albeit with cool nights. There is strong seasonal temperature variation, with average maxima vary from 23.7 °C (74.7 °F) in July to 37.6 °C (99.7 °F) in December. Average annual rainfall is low: 430.5 mm (16.95 in), occurring within 32.6 rainfall days, primarily in the summer. The town is sunny, averaging 163.7 clear days and only 51.6 cloudy days annually. Extreme temperatures have ranged from −3.3 °C (26.1 °F) on 27 June 1908 and 6 July 1908 to 47.9 °C (118.2 °F) on 26 January 1947.

Climate data for Longreach (23º26'24"S, 144º16'48"E, 192 m AMSL) (1966–2024 normals and extremes, rainfall to 1949)
Month	Jan	Feb	Mar	Apr	May	Jun	Jul	Aug	Sep	Oct	Nov	Dec	Year
Record high °C (°F)	47.9 (118.2)	45.6 (114.1)	45.0 (113.0)	39.6 (103.3)	36.5 (97.7)	34.4 (93.9)	34.0 (93.2)	37.9 (100.2)	41.5 (106.7)	43.9 (111.0)	45.8 (114.4)	46.6 (115.9)	47.9 (118.2)
Mean daily maximum °C (°F)	37.2 (99.0)	36.0 (96.8)	34.8 (94.6)	31.6 (88.9)	27.1 (80.8)	23.9 (75.0)	23.7 (74.7)	26.2 (79.2)	30.4 (86.7)	34.1 (93.4)	36.3 (97.3)	37.6 (99.7)	31.6 (88.8)
Mean daily minimum °C (°F)	23.4 (74.1)	22.6 (72.7)	20.6 (69.1)	16.6 (61.9)	12.1 (53.8)	8.4 (47.1)	7.3 (45.1)	8.6 (47.5)	12.8 (55.0)	17.1 (62.8)	20.2 (68.4)	22.3 (72.1)	16.0 (60.8)
Record low °C (°F)	13.4 (56.1)	12.8 (55.0)	3.9 (39.0)	2.9 (37.2)	0.5 (32.9)	−3.3 (26.1)	−3.3 (26.1)	−1.7 (28.9)	−0.6 (30.9)	2.2 (36.0)	5.0 (41.0)	6.6 (43.9)	−3.3 (26.1)
Average precipitation mm (inches)	76.8 (3.02)	75.1 (2.96)	57.0 (2.24)	34.0 (1.34)	23.2 (0.91)	17.9 (0.70)	18.6 (0.73)	10.9 (0.43)	11.8 (0.46)	22.6 (0.89)	29.9 (1.18)	52.7 (2.07)	430.5 (16.95)
Average precipitation days (≥ 1.0 mm)	5.2	4.9	3.3	2.0	1.6	1.5	1.6	1.2	1.5	2.5	3.0	4.3	32.6
Average afternoon relative humidity (%)	32	35	30	29	31	32	28	23	20	19	20	24	27
Average dew point °C (°F)	13.7 (56.7)	15.1 (59.2)	12.2 (54.0)	8.8 (47.8)	6.5 (43.7)	4.2 (39.6)	2.0 (35.6)	1.1 (34.0)	1.9 (35.4)	3.7 (38.7)	6.4 (43.5)	9.4 (48.9)	7.1 (44.8)
Source: Bureau of Meteorology (1966–2024 normals and extremes, rainfall to 1949)
