= Maneroo =

Maneroo Queensland
- Coordinates: 23.5033°S 143.7019°E
- Population: 37 (2016 census)
- Postcode(s): 4730
- Time zone: AEST (UTC+10:00)
- LGA(s): Longreach Region
- State electorate(s): Gregory
- Federal division(s): Maranoa
Suburbs around Maneroo:
Vergemont	Morella	Morella
Vergemont	Maneroo	Longreach
Tocal	Ernestina	Ernestina

Maneroo was a rural locality in the Longreach Region, Queensland, Australia. It is now part of Longreach.

== History ==
In the 2016 census, Maneroo had a population of 37 people.

In January 2019, it was decided to reduce the number of localities within the Longreach Region by amalgamating the localities to the north and west of the town of Longreach into the locality of Longreach. The localities amalgamated were: Camoola, Chorregon, Ernestina, Maneroo, Morella, Tocal, and Vergemont. As a consequence of this amalgamation, the Longreach Region has only three localities: Longreach, Ilfracombe and Isisford.
