= Tocal, Queensland =

Tocal Queensland
- Coordinates: 23.945°S 143.6630°E
- Population: 14 (2016 census)
- Postcode(s): 4730
- Time zone: AEST (UTC+10:00)
- LGA(s): Longreach Region
- State electorate(s): Gregory
- Federal division(s): Maranoa
Suburbs around Tocal:
Vergemont	Maneroo	Ernestina
Vergemont	Tocal	Ilfracombe
Stonehenge	Isisford	Isisford

Tocal was a rural locality in the Longreach Region, Queensland, Australia. It was amalgamated into the locality of Longreach.

== History ==
In the 2016 census, Tocal had a population of 14 people. In January 2019, it was decided to reduce the number of localities within Longreach Region by amalgamating the localities to the north and west of the town of Longreach into the locality of Longreach. The localities amalgamated were: Camoola, Chorregon, Ernestina, Maneroo, Morella, Tocal, and Vergemont. As a consequence of this amalgamation, the Longreach Region has only three localities: Longreach, Ilframcombe and Isisford.
