= Ilfracombe, Queensland =

Ilfracombe
- Town
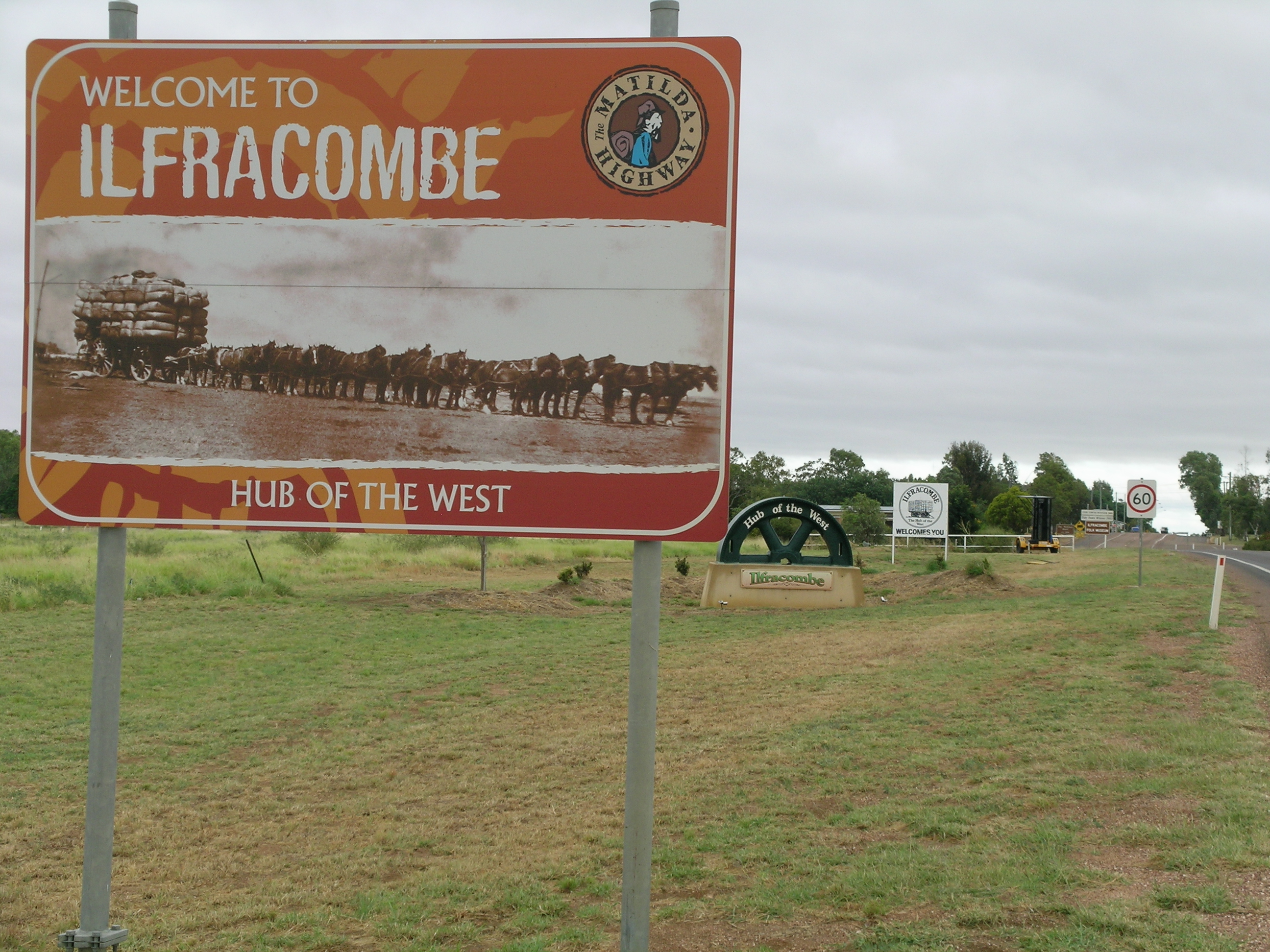
- Town entry signs, 2010

- Interactive map of Ilfracombe
- Coordinates: 23.4905°S 144.5094°E
- Country: Australia
- State: Queensland
- LGA: Longreach Region
- Location: 27.0 km (16.8 mi) E of Longreach; 80.8 km (50.2 mi) W of Barcaldine; 660 km (410 mi) W of Rockhampton; 1,152 km (716 mi) NW of Brisbane
- Established: 1891

Government
  - State electorate: Gregory
  - Federal division: Maranoa

Area
  - Total: 6,573.3 km^{2} (2,538.0 sq mi)
- Elevation: 214 m (702 ft)

Population
  - Total: 310 (2021 census)
  - Density: 0.0472/km^{2} (0.1221/sq mi)
- Time zone: UTC+10:00 (AEST)
- Postcode: 4727
Localities around Ilfracombe
Longreach	Muttaburra	Aramac
Longreach	Ilfracombe	Barcaldine
Longreach	Isisford	Blackall

Ilfracombe /ˈɪlfrəkoʊm/ is a rural town and locality in the Longreach Region, Queensland, Australia. In the 2021 census, the locality of Ilfracombe had a population of 310 people.

Ilfracombe calls itself The Hub of the West. The main industry is sheep rearing, mainly for wool.

== Geography ==
Ilfracombe is situated on the Landsborough Highway, about 27 kilometres (17 mi) east of Longreach, 214 metres (702 ft) above sea level.

Mount Rodney is in the north-east of the locality (23.0269°S 144.8483°E). It was named in 1861 by Frederick Walker after Rodney, an Aboriginal member of Walker's expedition. It rises to 262 metres (860 ft).

The Central Western railway line passes through the locality with a number of rail stops in the locality (from west to east):

- Ilfracombe railway station, serving the town (23.4891°S 144.5078°E)
- Dartmouth railway station, now abandoned (23.5133°S 144.7089°E)
- Deroora railway station (23.5235°S 144.8614°E)

== History ==
Sheep stations were established in the area from 1864.

The townsites of Ilfracombe and Longreach were amongst resumed portions of Wellshot Station. In 1892, Wellshot was known as the biggest sheep station in the world, not because of the area it occupied but because of the number of sheep it ran; 460,000. 40,000 two-year-old wethers were sold off from the property later the same year.

The Central Western railway line reached Ilfracombe in 1891 and the Post Office opened on 7 December 1891.

On 1 July 1892, the town was renamed from Wellshot was renamed Ilfracombe after the coastal town of Ilfracombe in North Devon, England.

Ilfracombe Provisional School opened on 3 May 1893. On 28 June 1899 it became Ilfracombe State School.

On 27 December 1902, part of the Aramac Division was excised to create a new local government area Ilfracombe Division, becoming Shire of Ilfracombe in 1903. Ilfracombe was the seat of the division/shire. On 15 March 2008, the Shire of Ilfracombe merged with the Shires of Isisford and Longreach to form the Longreach Region.

On Sunday 10 September 1905, the Sacred Heart Catholic Church was opened at 2 Main Street by Reverend Edward Carroll of Longreach. It was built by Mr Hegarty of Rockhampton from timber and was 49 by 20 feet (14.9 m × 6.1 m). It cost £207 and was open free of debt. It was replaced in 1962 by a new church building, known as the Sacred Heart War Memorial Catholic Church.

In April 1910, Isisford became the first town in Australia to be serviced by a motorised mail delivery from Ilfracombe, a journey of 90 kilometres (56 mi).

The town was much larger in the past. It once had three hotels instead of the single hotel and two general stores as at 2012.

A 1.9-metre (6 ft 3 in) metal sculpture of National Rugby League player Matt Scott, who grew up in Ilfracombe, was unveiled in the town on 24 September 2021. It was created by scrap metal artist Milynda Rogers who was commissioned by the Ilfracombe District Progress Association with the aim of inspiring the region's youth while also giving the town a focus of pride. Approximately 200 people attended the official unveiling.

== Demographics ==
In the 2016 census, the locality of Ilfracombe had a population of 259 people. 84.3% of people were born in Australia and 89.3% of people spoke only English at home. The most common response for religion was Anglican at 39.5%.

In the 2021 census, the locality of Ilfracombe had a population of 310 people.

== Heritage listings ==
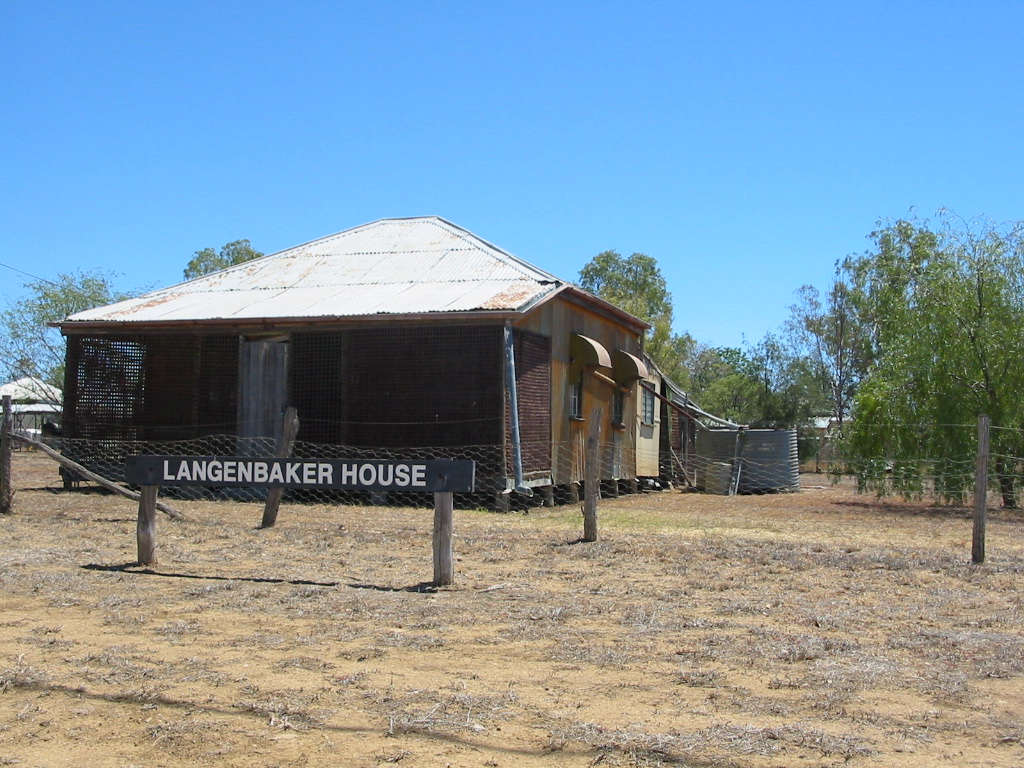
Langenbaker House, 2003

Ilfracombe has a number of heritage-listed sites, including:

- former Beaconsfield Station Sheep Wash, Beaconsfield Station (23.3252°S 144.5493°E)
- Langenbaker House, Mitchell Street (23.4918°S 144.5087°E)

== Education ==
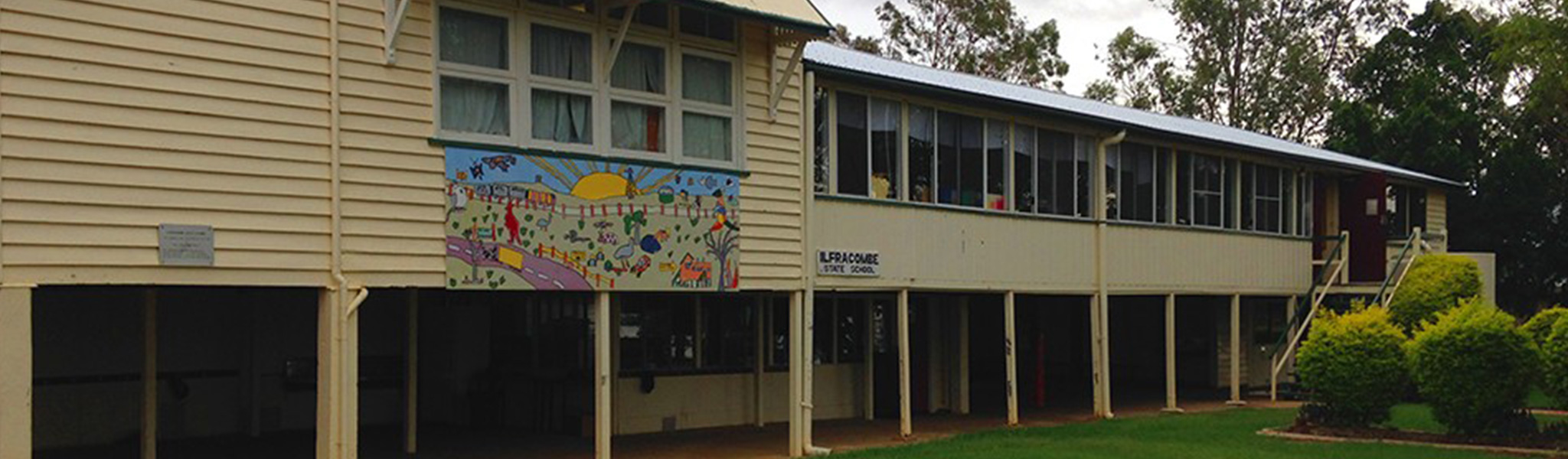
Ilfracombe State School, 2022

Ilfracombe State School is a government primary (Prep-6) school for boys and girls at 20 McMaster Drive (23.4890°S 144.5046°E). In 2018, the school had an enrolment of 10 students with 2 teachers (1 full-time equivalent) and 5 non-teaching staff (3 full-time equivalent). It is organised into multi-age classes.

There are no secondary schools in Ilfracombe. The nearest government secondary schools are Longreach State High School (to Year 12) in neighbouring Longreach to west and Barcaldine State School (to Year 12) in neighbouring Barcaldine to the east. As some parts of the locality of Ilfracombe are a long distance by road from these schools, other options are distance education and boarding schools.

== Amenities ==
Ilfracombe Post Office is at 20 Main Avenue. The Longreach Regional Council operates a public library at the post office using the Rural Libraries Queensland service. The library offers public access to Wi-Fi.

The Sacred Heart War Memorial Catholic Church is at 2 Main Street (Landsborough Highway, 23.49035°S 144.50991°E).

Other attractions and facilities in the town include swimming pool, a 14-hole golf course, racecourse and caravan park.

== Attractions ==
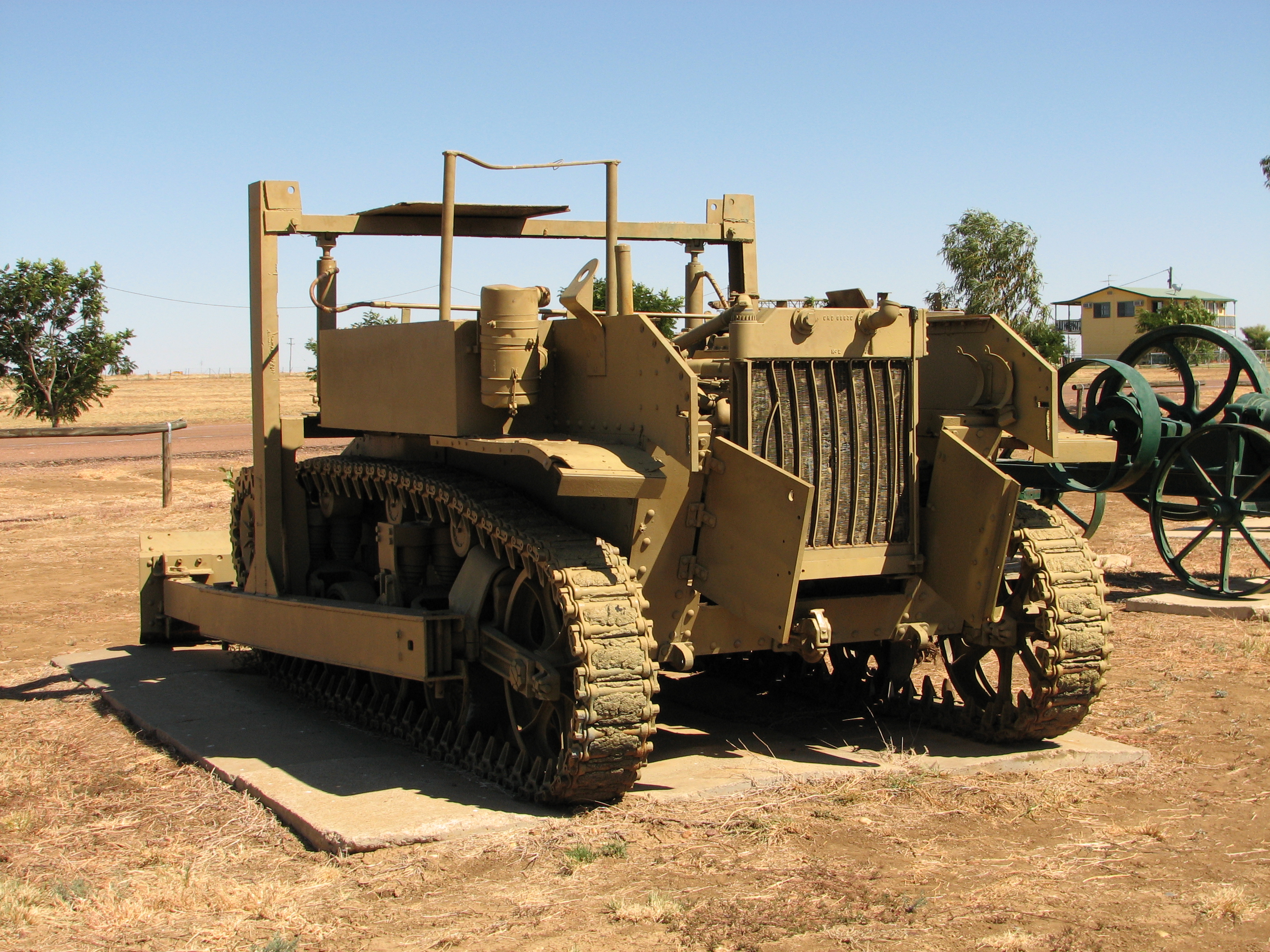
WWII Stuart Tank converted to farm machinery, 2007

The Great Machinery Mile is an open-air display of a range of antique agricultural machinery from the local area spread alongside the Landsborough Highway within the town (23.4887°S 144.5057°E). It is part of the Ilfracombe Machinery and Heritage Museum.

Guided tours are available of the heritage-listed Langenbacker House in Mitchell Street (23.4918°S 144.5087°E).

== Notable people ==
Notable people from the area include:

- Quentin Bryce, Governor of Queensland and Governor-General of Australia
- Matthew Scott, rugby league player
- Paul Wilson, marketing professional and author of the self-help book The Little Book of Calm
