= Longreach Region =

- Local government area
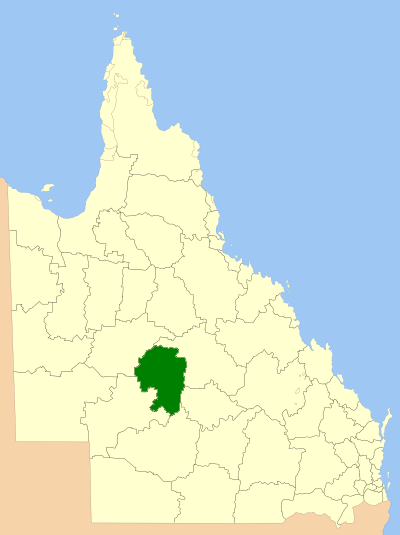
- Location within Queensland

- Interactive map of Longreach Region
- Country: Australia
- State: Queensland
- Region: Central West Queensland
- Established: 2008
- Council seat: Longreach

Government
  - Mayor: Tony Rayner
  - State electorate: Gregory
  - Federal division: Maranoa

Area
  - Total: 40,619.5 km^{2} (15,683.3 sq mi)

Population
  - Total: 3,647 (2021 census)
  - Density: 0.089784/km^{2} (0.23254/sq mi)
- Website: Longreach Region
LGAs around Longreach Region
Winton	Flinders	Barcaldine
Winton	Longreach Region	Barcaldine
Barcoo	Quilpie	Blackall-Tambo

The Longreach Region is a local government area in Central West Queensland, Australia. Established in 2008, it superseded three previous local government areas that had existed for more than a century.

It has an estimated operating budget of A$22.3m.

Traditionally, pastoral activities, tourism, and rural education have been the areas of focus within the region, with a major agricultural college and attractions such as the Australian Stockman's Hall of Fame and the Qantas Founders Museum.

In the 2021 census, the Longreach Region had a population of 3,647 people.

== History ==
Longreach Region lay on the traditional tribal lands of the Iningai. Iningai (also known as Yiningay, Muttaburra, Tateburra, Yinangay, Yinangi) is an Australian Aboriginal language spoken by the Iningai people. The Iningai language region includes the landscape within the local government boundaries of the Longreach Region, particularly the towns of Longreach, Barcaldine, Muttaburra and Aramac as well as the properties of Bowen Downs and catchments of Cornish Creek and Alice River.

Kuungkari (also known as Kungkari and Koonkerri) is a language of Western Queensland. The Kuungkari language region includes the landscape within the local government boundaries of Longreach Shire Council and Blackall-Tambo Shire Council.

Prior to the 2008 amalgamation, the Longreach Region existed as three distinct local government areas:

- the Shire of Longreach;
- the Shire of Ilfracombe;
- and the Shire of Isisford.

In July 2007, the Local Government Reform Commission released its report recommending that the three areas amalgamate. Ilfracombe was rated by a Treasury sustainability review as very weak with a negative outlook, while the other two were rated as moderate. All three councils opposed the amalgamation. The legislation passed to effect the merger on 10 August 2007. A Local Transition Committee made up of staff and councillors of the three dissolving entities was formed to manage the process. On 15 March 2008, the three Shires formally ceased to exist, and elections were held on the same day to elect councillors and a mayor to the Regional Council.

In January 2019, it was decided to reduce the number of localities within Longreach Region by amalgamating the localities to the north and west of the town of Longreach into the locality of Longreach. The localities amalgamated were: Camoola, Chorregon, Ernestina, Maneroo, Morella, Tocal, and Vergemont. As a consequence of this amalgamation, the Longreach Region has only three localities: Longreach, Ilframcombe and Isisford.

On 10 September 2021, a new locality called Yaraka was created around the town of Yaraka, the land being excised from the locality of Isisford, to avoid confusion and restore historical connections.

== Council ==
=== Current composition ===
The current council, elected in 2020, is:

Ward	Councillor	Party
Mayor	Anthony Rayner	Independent
Councillor	Dale Bignell	Independent
Councillor	Tony Emslie	Independent
Councillor	Tracy Hatch	Independent
Councillor	Tony Martin	Independent
Councillor	Leonie Nunn	Independent
Councillor	Trevor Smith	Independent

== Mayors ==
=== 2008−present ===
No.	Portrait	Mayor	Party	Term start	Term end
1		John Palmer	Independent	15 March 2008	28 April 2012
2		R. L. "Joe" Owens	Independent	28 April 2012	19 March 2016
2		Ed Warren	Independent	19 March 2016	28 March 2020
4		Tony Rayner	Independent	28 March 2020	incumbent

== Past councillors ==
=== 2008−2012 (six wards) ===
Year	Division 1		Division 2		Division 3		Division 4		Division 5		Division 6	
Year	Councillor	Party	Councillor	Party	Councillor	Party	Councillor	Party	Councillor	Party	Councillor	Party
2008	Tony Nielsen	Independent	Robert "Mick" Bischel	Independent	Richard Murray	Independent	Glennis Ford	Independent	Norma Rae Bowden	Independent	Ken Hoolihan	Independent

=== 2012−present (unsubdivided) ===
Year	Councillor	Party	Councillor	Party	Councillor	Party	Councillor	Party	Councillor	Party	Councillor	Party
2012	Jocelyn Avery	Independent	Norma Rae Bowden	Independent	Tony Emslie	Independent	David Morton	Independent	Tony Nielsen	Independent	Trevor Smith	Independent
2016	Trevor Harris	Independent	Tony Martin	Independent	Tony Emslie	Independent	Leonie Nunn	Independent	Anthony Rayner	Independent	Trevor Smith	Independent
2020	Dale Bignell	Independent	Tony Martin	Independent	Tony Emslie	Independent	Leonie Nunn	Independent	Tracy Hatch	Independent	Trevor Smith	Independent

== Towns and localities ==
The Longreach Region includes the following settlements:

Longreach area:

- Arrilalah
- Camoola (former)
- Chorregon (former)
- Ernestina (former)
- Longreach
- Maneroo (former)
- Morella (former)
- Tocal (former)
- Vergemont (former)

Ilfracombe area:

- Ilfracombe

Isisford area:

- Emmet
- Isisford
- Yaraka

== Amenities ==
Longreach Regional Council operates public libraries at Ilfracombe, Isisford, and Longreach.

== Demographics ==
The populations given relate to the component entities prior to 2008 and combined population after amalgamation. The population has been in steady decline since the early 1960s.

Year	Population (Total)	(Longreach)	(Ilfracombe)	(Isisford)
1933	6,079	4,564	642	873
1947	5,244	4,137	450	657
1954	5,694	4,343	544	807
1961	6,533	5,013	653	867
1966	6,366	4,959	660	747
1971	5,142	4,300	389	453
1976	4,911	4,052	428	431
1981	4,911	3,846	460	605
1986	4,663	3,871	327	465
1991	5,153	4,369	344	440
1996	5,054	4,419	333	302
2001	5,037	4,368	356	313
2006	4,806	4,180	279	347
2011	4,189			
2016	3,660			
2021	3,647			
