= Old Isisford District Hospital =

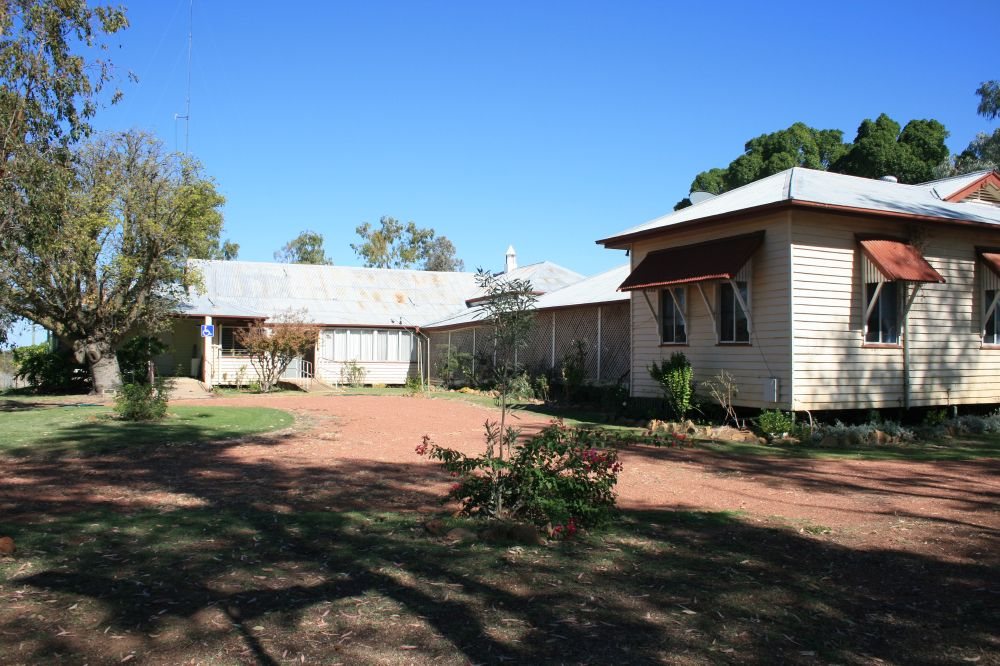
- Isisford Hospital - entrance from North, 2014

- Location within Queensland
- 24.2610°S 144.4390°E
- Location: 6 St Agnes Street, Isisford, Longreach Region, Queensland, Australia

History
- Built: 1892–1960

Site notes
- Architect: Queensland Department of Public Works

Queensland Heritage Register
- Official name: Isisford District Hospital (former)
- Type: state heritage
- Designated: 9 September 2014
- Reference no.: 602837
- Type: Health and care services: Hospital-public
- Theme: Providing health and welfare services: Providing health services

Old Isisford District Hospital is a heritage-listed former public hospital at 6 St Agnes Street, Isisford, Longreach Region, Queensland, Australia. It was designed by Queensland Department of Public Works and built from 1914 to 1918. It is also known as Isisford District Hospital (former). It was added to the Queensland Heritage Register on 9 September 2014.

== History ==
The former Isisford District Hospital is a timber-framed and -clad complex with corrugated iron roofing, located in western central Queensland. Established in 1892, with additions between 1902 and 1961, it functioned as a hospital to 1970 and as a clinic until 2011. It is a fine example of a district hospital and demonstrates the evolution of Queensland district hospitals from the 1890s in accordance with changes to community needs, health practices and hospital legislation.

Explored during the 1840s and 1850s, the Isisford district, centred on the Barcoo River, was settled by pastoralists from the mid-1860s. In 1874 William and James Whitman established themselves at the site of Isisford and called the place "Whittown". Pastoral development south along the Barcoo River brought workers, drovers and teamsters, boosting Whittown as a service centre. In 1878 the town was surveyed and renamed "Isis Ford". During the 1880s further development in the region occurred. Wool production increased, bringing more shearers into the district. Construction of the Central Western railway line from Rockhampton brought transportation closer with each stage completed - reaching Jericho in 1885, and Barcaldine in November 1886.

The requirement for a hospital and a doctor, to serve the medical needs of the town and district, was recognised by 1887. In 1891 a provisional hospital committee was formed. It quickly raised £400 with another £800 promised. A public meeting in October 1891 appointed a permanent hospital committee, which by April 1892 had complied with the regulations of the Hospitals' Act 1862 and was eligible for a government subsidy. An application for a site on which to erect the hospital buildings was made to the Department of Public Lands and a hospital reserve was subsequently created. In September 1892 the committee had £1000 in funds available and the hospital was under construction. At the end of October 1892, the committee was advertising for a matron and a wardsman, and by February the following year the hospital was treating patients.

Isisford District Hospital's plan, location and siting on a large reserve occupying a rise to the south of the town centre, followed the accepted principles for late nineteenth century hospitals. As a series of interconnected buildings, it conformed to the popular pavilion plan for hospitals, comprising a series of detached pavilions, designed to provide light and fresh air. Like other small Queensland hospitals, the wards and rooms of the Isisford District Hospital were enclosed by wide verandahs, while kitchen, bathroom and toilet facilities were contained in semi-detached blocks. The design of hospital buildings, and their location and siting, was influenced by the widely accepted miasmatic theory of disease, which postulated that disease was transmitted by breathing air that was contaminated. Therefore, good ventilation and sanitation would reduce the spread of disease. An essential element of a good hospital site was an elevated position on a generous area of land, preferably on the outskirts of a town. The elevated site was advantageous in catching breezes and enhancing the flow of fresh air through the wards. A large hospital reserve, well removed from the urban centre, was believed to minimise the effect of noxious and foul vapours. Hospital reserves at this time were almost invariably on the outskirts of a town and comprised an extensive area of land, well in excess of what was required, with the main block and out-buildings occupying less than a tenth of the total reserve.

Managed by its committee, with the support of the wider community, the Isisford District Hospital provided valuable medical service for the next 52 years. Funds were raised through subscriptions from members of the community, shearers' contributions, donations of goods and money, and fund-raising events, such as concerts.

Isisford and its surrounding district grew over the three decades following the hospital's establishment. In 1901 Isisford's population was 270, rising to 356 in 1907 and peaking at 388 residents in 1921. Growth in selector numbers in the Isisford district between 1902 and 1926, stimulated by the western progress of the Central Western railway line, combined with a run of good seasons, provided two decades of sustained prosperity.

This growth was reflected by several additions to the hospital. A morgue building was added by September 1903. In 1908 tenders were called for addition of a female ward. In May 1913 an additional building was being erected. The purpose of this building is not mentioned in any reports, but matron and nurses' quarters were being furnished in October 1913 and a 1927 newspaper article notes the earlier addition of nurses' quarters to the original hospital.

Wide-ranging, long-term changes to hospital management in Queensland resulted from the Labor Party (ALP) coming to power in Queensland in 1915 and governing almost without interruption until 1957. In April 1916 several Queensland newspapers carried the story that the Queensland Government intended to take over the management of the Isisford District Hospital. A new committee had been appointed which included two government representatives. However, this made little difference to the management of the hospital - the committee still funded the hospital through fund-raising and donations, supplemented by government subsidies for buildings and maintenance.

During World War I the Isisford District Hospital Committee struggled to retain a doctor. Believing it would be easier to keep a doctor in Isisford if accommodation could be provided, the committee in 1918 set about funding a doctor's residence, subsidised by the Queensland Government. It was erected by the beginning of 1921.

Not long afterwards the attributes of the hospital were listed by the Western Champion newspaper:

'If there is one institution in Isisford of which the town and district people may feel proud it is the hospital. The fine block of buildings is erected on an elevated central position, and a beautiful breeze appears to always prevail around the spacious verandahs. It is over 30 years since the Isisford Hospital was founded - certainly in a small way at first, but the buildings have been gradually added to and improved until now the hospital is worthy of a place in much larger towns... The hospital in Isisford appears altogether too large and well-appointed for the size of the town, but still in years to come it may be too inadequate. There are male and female wards, in addition to private wards... operating theatre... dispensary.... The nurses and matron's private rooms are very snug. The northern verandah is well-curtained, and here the nurses have a very comfortable open-air sleeping apartment.... Separating the staff's apartments from the wards is a wide lounge, running the whole length of the building.... The kitchen is commodious and well equipped, and all the doors and windows are gauzed. There is ample verandah space - a most commendable provision on the part of the designers of the building. There is also a lock ward - a separate building, not long erected at a cost of £400 ... and arrangements are well forward for the erection of a maternity ward and also an infectious diseases ward. The hospital water supply is well provided for ... by means of several large tanks, while a "hospital" cow supplies all the milk that is necessary. The building is lighted throughout with acetylene gas.... A very fine new residence (which adjoins the hospital) has just been erected and furnished at a cost of about £1700 for the doctor.'

The next major development of the Isisford District Hospital followed the passing of Queensland's Maternity Act 1922, the state's response to the Australia-wide and international movement to reduce infant mortality and improve maternal health. The Act established a network of free maternity hospitals throughout Queensland, managed under the Motherhood, Child Welfare and Hospital Fund, financed through the profits of the state-run lottery, the Golden Casket, established in 1920. The Act sought to decrease the death rate for mothers and babies; to increase the birth-rate; to expand outback settlement, and to train mothers how to care for children, thereby developing a healthy population. Over a 15-year period an extensive network of maternity wards and hospitals throughout the state changed maternity services in Queensland from privately run nursing homes or home births to public hospitals:

"By 1940 almost all women in Queensland had access to a government-built maternity facility. No other state government developed such a comprehensive network of maternity facilities".

Priority in the provision of maternity wards was given to the more remote and isolated communities. Isisford was in the first group of towns to receive a maternity ward. Isisford District Hospital, received a standard plan five bed maternity ward (without a septic ward annex) designed by the Department of Public Works, erected in 1923–24 and opened in January 1925. The maternity ward "comprised a labour ward, sterilising room, duty room and two two-bed wards which opened onto a verandah. The building was connected to the main block by a covered walkway". It cost, with furniture, approximately £1600. The cost of its maintenance was to be met by the Isisford District Hospital Committee. In 1927 the growth of the Isisford District Hospital was described by The Longreach Leader:

"The original hospital building is now used for two female wards and a kitchen. Additions since opening have been nurses' quarters, two female wards, operating theatre, isolation ward, maternity ward and doctor's residence. The institution is equipped with electric lighting and Xray plant. Staff comprise a medical officer, matron, two nurses and the domestic staff namely yardsman, cook, housemaid and laundress. There are four general wards - public and private ward for males and two similar wards for females."

Further health legislation, which altered hospital and medical services in the state, was enacted during the 1920s and 1930s by the Queensland Government. The Hospitals Act 1923 established the model for future management of hospitals through district boards.

However, in the 1930s the Isisford District Hospital was still supported by the fund-raising efforts of its committee, showing the importance of the institution to the district. Throughout the 1930s the Isisford Hospital Committee undertook alterations and additions to improve the hospital including alterations to the maternity ward in 1933 increase ventilation in the building the addition in 1935, of reticulated water, after the council's weir was completed in October 1934.

Post-World War II was a period of great change to hospital funding and operations in Australia. Queensland's Health Act Amendment Act 1944 ended any voluntary hospitals still operating and gave the Queensland Government complete control of the hospital system. Local authorities were relieved of any financial responsibility towards the maintenance of hospitals, and their representation on boards was reduced to one member with the remainder appointed by the government. Isisford Hospital came under the control of the Blackall Hospitals Board.

Staffing became an issue again post-World War II, which prompted the community to fund-raise to resolve this problem. There was no doctor at Isisford Hospital between December 1945 and May 1946 and when the remaining medical staff resigned because of over-work, the hospital temporarily closed. This prompted the committee to send a letter of complaint to Queensland Premier Ned Hanlon in May 1946 about the lack of staff at Isisford Hospital due to bureaucratic inefficiency. At the same time a series of public meetings were held and Isisford established the Isisford Hospital Benefit Fund from June 1946 - a voluntary subscription list for the purpose of endowing the nursing staffs' wages at £5 per person per calendar month, as compensation for the extra cost of living in the isolated district. As a result of the wage bonus, the Matron returned and two double-certificated nurses and an assistant nurse were obtained. Thereafter, the extra £5 per month made it possible to retain a full nursing staff. However, it still remained difficult to get doctors appointed through the centralised system and to retain them.

Post-World War II, Isisford's population rose and its facilities developed due to good seasons and a boom in wool prices. However, the 1956 shearers' strike led to the loss of shearers from the town thereafter.

Starting in 1948 and continuing into the 1950s, extensions were made to Isisford Hospital including: a kitchen, operating theatre and an extension to one of the 1892 buildings. Blackall Hospitals Board was advised by the Department of Health and Home Affairs that its plan for remodelling the Isisford Hospital had been approved; there was also approval for installation of an X-ray plant at Isisford.

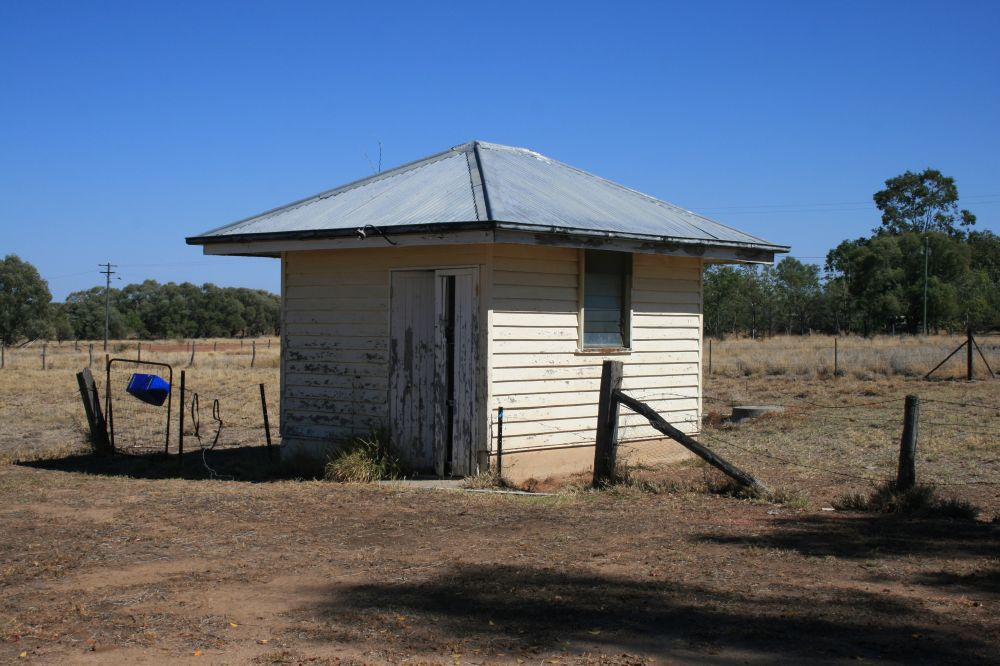
Morgue, 2014

In early 1956 the Isisford morgue was damaged by a windstorm and the Blackall Hospital Board recommended that a new morgue building should be erected. In the same year the 1892 ward building, was removed. By 1958, a new operating theatre with terrazzo floor, designed by Brisbane architects Fulton & Collin was completed. Remodelling and additions, including kitchen and laundry, occurred at Isisford Hospital in the 1950s and 1960s.

For Isisford, the 1960s and 1970s were a period of decline. The last full-time resident doctor left in 1959. By 1961 the population had fallen to 293, and continued to fall, especially with the 1965 drought, reaching 169 in 1971. This resulted in a loss of services; for example, in 1979 the Isisford Post Office was downgraded to an unofficial post office.

On 14 September 1970, the Queensland Cabinet decided that Isisford Hospital in future would operate as an Outpatients' Centre with a number of holding beds and a dental clinic. The facilities on the hospital site at this time were: a general section with a private ward (one bed), male public ward (four beds), female public ward (4 beds); a maternity section with a public ward (two beds), two private rooms and a labour ward; outpatient department; operating theatre block; Xray department; dental clinic; kitchen and dining room block; laundry block; boiler house; morgue; storerooms; nursing staff quarters in the quarters provided for the medical superintendent; and male staff quarters in the kitchen/dining room block. The public ward and nursery in the maternity ward was used by the Matron as a bedroom and sitting room, and the private rooms had been converted to a Dental Clinic because maternity cases were transferred to the Blackall Hospital. Later, the medical superintendent's residence was removed.

In 1996, a survey of the heritage buildings under the administration of the Queensland Department of Health identified the Isisford Hospital Maternity Ward as of state heritage significance. It concluded that the building was substantially intact. The 1909 pavilion ward was also identified as a significant twentieth century pavilion ward.

In the twenty-first century, a further reduction of services to the region occurred with the closure of the Jericho-Yaraka railway line and its replacement with sealed road from Blackall to Windorah. Queensland Rail ceased operations on the Yaraka line in November of the same year. In 2006 Isisford's population was 262 - its level in the 1960s and 1970s.

The Isisford Clinic in the former Isisford District Hospital closed in 2011, when it was replaced by a new Isisford Primary Health Clinic located nearby on the corner of St Agnes and St Helena Streets, still within the former hospital reserve. In 2014, its future use has yet to be determined.

As at 2014, the former Isisford District Hospital retains fabric from its earliest phase through its development over the ensuring 70 years. Part of the original hospital is at the core of its pavilion plan. The 1909 pavilion ward is intact and now uncommon. Of the 78 twentieth century pavilion hospitals and wards identified in the 1996 Queensland Health Heritage Survey, this ward is one of fewer than 21 extant. The 1924 maternity ward is one of no more than 13 former standard plan maternity wards remaining from the 71 that were built according to the standard 5/9 bed plan between 1923 and 1936. Of the existing standard plan maternity wards, most have been substantially modified and no longer demonstrate the principal characteristics of the standard plan, whereas the Isisford Maternity Ward remains one of the most intact standard maternity wards.

== Description ==
The former Isisford Hospital is located in an elevated central position at the corner of St Agnes and St Helena Streets in the small town of Isisford, western central Queensland. It comprises a spacious complex of lowset, single storey, timber-framed and clad buildings sheltered under corrugated iron roofs and interconnected by verandahs and covered ways. The buildings include: the 1892 building; 1909 pavilion female ward; 1924 maternity ward; 1950s operating theatre, 1950s morgue and 1961 kitchen wing. Mature plantings in the vicinity of the hospital include a kurrajong (Brachychiton populneus), Moreton Bay fig (Ficus macrophylla) and a Eucalyptus.

The 1892 building is positioned laterally under a gabled roof between the 1909 pavilion ward to the west and the 1950s operating theatre to the southeast. Its timber frame, clad internally with chamferboards, is exposed to the southern enclosed verandah with the remainder of the building clad in weatherboards or flat sheeting. Its western end has been extended under the adjacent 1909 ward verandah and rooms reconfigured to accommodate an outpatients clinic. The eastern end is covered by the interior walls and ceilings are lined with flat sheeting, floors with vinyl and joinery has been replaced. The southern verandah, providing access between the buildings, is enclosed with lattice and the northern verandah has been enclosed to form a waiting room and pharmacy. Access to the building is from the north via a concrete ramp.

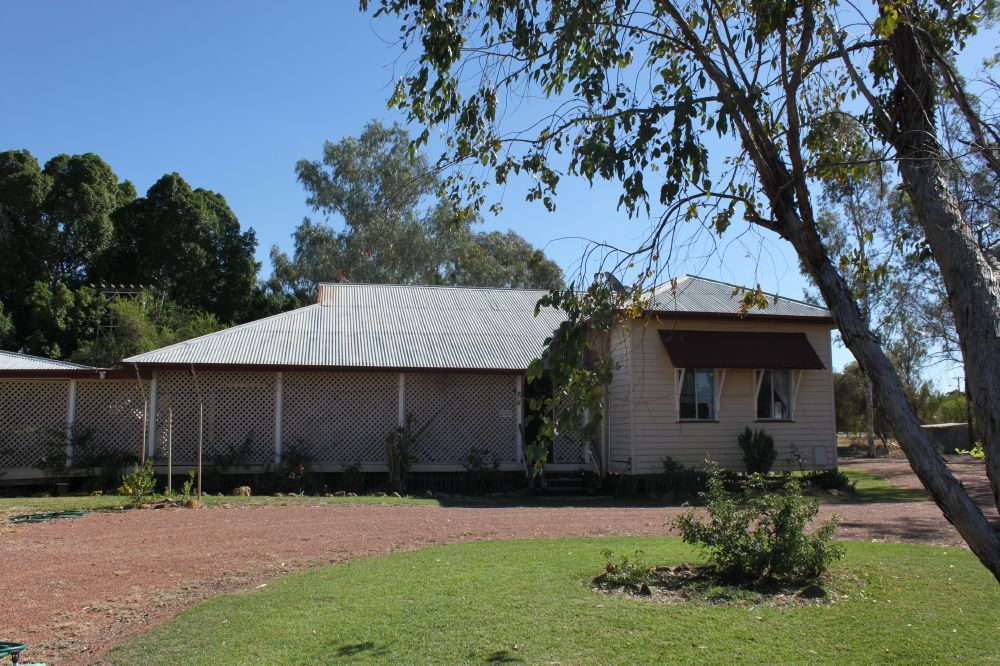
Verandahs enclosed with lattice, 2014

The 1909 pavilion female ward is a long rectangular building under a hipped roof, encircled by wide verandahs generally enclosed with lattice. It is of exposed frame construction, clad internally with wide, v-jointed tongue-and-groove boards with a coved pressed metal ceiling and polished timber floor. One room wide, it retains its early joinery: a pair of French doors with fanlight at each end and four along each side. A centrally located nurses' station, separating the two ward rooms projects onto the western verandah opposite the entrance to the building. This space is lined with flat sheeting, has doors and viewing windows into the wards and a pair of doors providing access to the eastern verandah. A secondary set of stairs is located on the southern verandah adjacent to the bathroom. These facilities in the southwest corner have a 1950s fitout including laminate panelling and terrazzo floors. A similarly finished 1950s kitchen addition and two staff rooms are located on the northern verandah.

The 1924 maternity ward, a standard five-bed design, without a septic ward, has a hipped corrugated iron roof with vented gablets and is attached to the north end of the 1909 female ward by a short covered walkway. The main entrance is located on the eastern verandah with secondary stairs on the western verandah. V-jointed tongue-and-groove boards line external walls, sheltered by verandahs, and internal walls and ceilings. Joinery generally remains intact except for the replacement of casement window sashes with sliding aluminium windows. Floors are lined with vinyl. Alterations are minor and include: the fitout of the former duty room with kitchen cabinets; openings formed in the north and south walls of the former sterilising room; removal of the partition wall between the single bed wards; sheeting over wall vents between the single and two-bed ward rooms; enclosure of the northwest verandah; and lattice screens and vertical louvres to verandahs.

Later buildings on the site date from the 1950s and have low pitched corrugated iron roofs and wide eaves. The operating theatre attached to the southern end of the 1909 pavilion ward is clad in weatherboards and comprises an entrance hall, operating theatre and ancillary space with flat sheet linings and terrazzo floors. Parallel and to the east of the theatre wing is the 1960s kitchen, attached to the southeastern end of the 1892 building's verandah. Clad in weatherboards, this building houses a kitchen, dining room and living quarters accessed from an open verandah to the east and a lattice enclosed verandah to the west. The roof of this wing extends to the north beyond the 1892 wing and over the former emergency room of the outpatients clinic, forming a verandah along its north and eastern sides. The 1950s morgue is a small detached building clad in weatherboards on a concrete slab to the west of the 1909 ward.

The hospital sits within expansive grounds and large established trees surround the hospital complex. These including a kurrajong tree to the north of the 1892 building and a Moreton Bay fig tree and a Eucalyptus to the west of the 1909 ward.

== Heritage listing ==
Old Isisford District Hospital was listed on the Queensland Heritage Register on 9 September 2014 having satisfied the following criteria.

The place is important in demonstrating the evolution or pattern of Queensland's history.

The former Isisford District Hospital (1892–1970) is important in demonstrating the evolution of the provision of hospital and medical services to rural communities in Queensland during the nineteenth and twentieth centuries. The original 1892 building, 1909 female ward, 1924 maternity ward, 1950s morgue, operating theatre and 1961 kitchen extension resulted from the increasing needs of the developing community, changing health practices and evolving government policies regulating hospital services.

The former maternity ward (1924) is important in demonstrating the development of maternity services in Queensland as a result of the Maternity Act 1922. This building, located in an isolated western town, also demonstrates the extensiveness of the 1922 policy.

The place demonstrates rare, uncommon or endangered aspects of Queensland's cultural heritage.

The former Isisford District Hospital maternity ward is an uncommon and intact example of a standard plan Department of Public Works maternity ward; a design that was once common. Of the 71 maternity wards erected in Queensland, it is one of two most intact maternity wards surviving.

The 1909 pavilion ward is an uncommon and intact example of a twentieth century pavilion ward; a design that was once common.

The place is important in demonstrating the principal characteristics of a particular class of cultural places.

The former Isisford District Hospital is important in demonstrating the principal characteristics of a district hospital in Queensland. Located on a large, elevated site at a distance from the town centre, the hospital includes wards, operating theatre, maternity ward, sterilising room, dispensary, morgue, staff accommodation, kitchen and laundry facilities.

The Maternity Ward is important in demonstrating the principal characteristics of a standard plan five bed maternity ward built as a result of the Maternity Act 1922. These are the labour ward, sterilising room, duty room (nursery), two single bed wards, one two-bed ward, and an ancillary wing connected by verandahs.
