= Isis Downs Station =

Pastoral lease in Queensland

Coordinates: 24.22008°S 144.62555°E

Location in Queensland

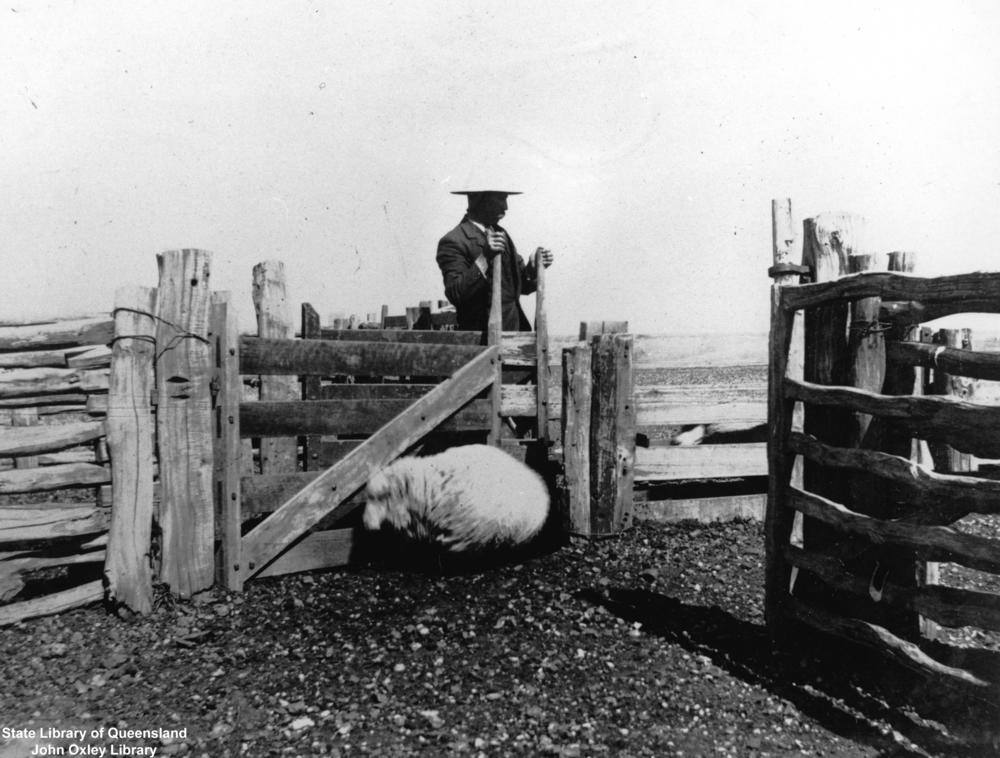
Sheep being drafted into sheep pens on Isis Downs,c. 1900-1910

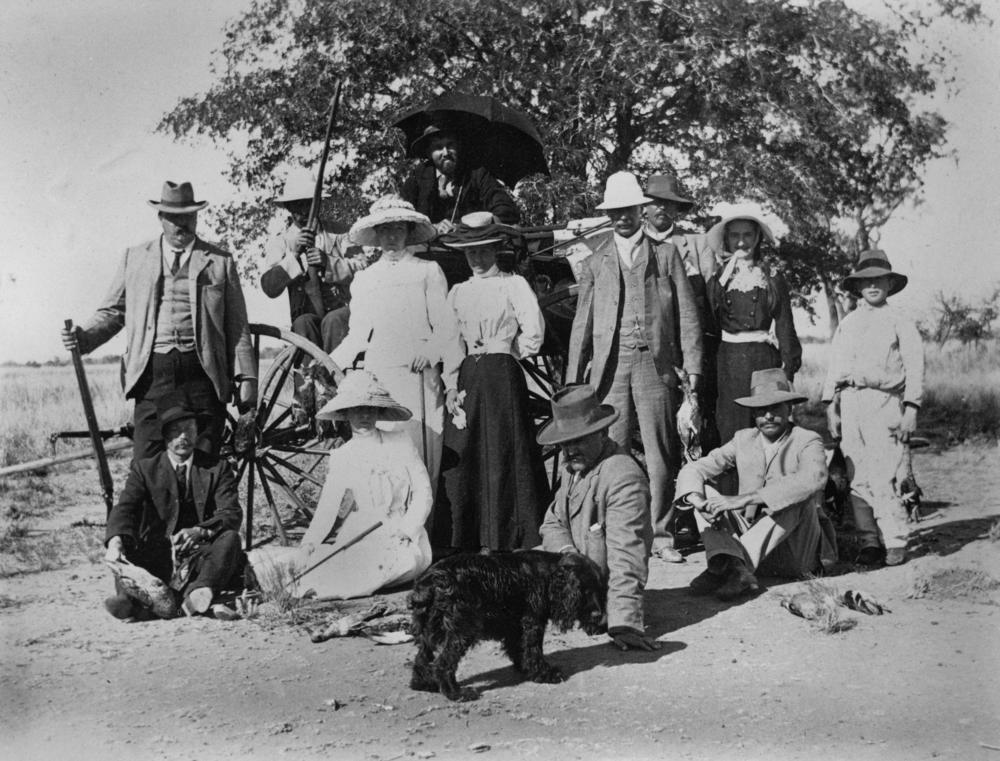
Shooting party at Isis Downs Station, c. 1905

Isis Downs Station is a pastoral lease that currently operates as a cattle station but has previously operated as a sheep station in Queensland, Australia.

== Location ==
The property is situated approximately 81 kilometres (50 mi) south of Ilfracombe and 88 kilometres (55 mi) west of Blackall. The property is flanked by the Barcoo River.

== History ==
It was initially established by Charles Lumley-Hill, W. St John Holberton and W. B. Allen in 1867. They named it after the Isis River, a tributary of the Thames River, in England. The same group advertised the property for sale in 1872, when it was stocked with about 20,000 sheep.

Isis Downs was sold in 1873 for £17,067 to Messrs John Govett and James Thomson, with eight blocks of unstocked country to the north of the property being sold to Mr. Stevenson for £3750. Govett and Thomson utilised Chinese coolies, blackbirded South Sea Islanders and Aboriginal women and children as labour. Several of the Islanders died from typhoid fever and another was shot after he stabbed the overseer at nearby Terrick Downs in the chest.

By 1877, a town was established not far from the station by William and James Whitman to support the local pastoral industry. To begin with the town was known as Whittown or Whittington but by 1897 was named Isisford.

In 1877 Isis Downs was acquired by William John Clarke; he owned it until 1883, but let it go. It then changed hands a number of times before Robert Selmon Whiting and William John Clarke's son, Sir Rupert Clarke who acquired it in 1910. The station encompassed an area of 9,000 square miles (23,310 km^{2}) and had commanded a price of £200,000. In 1912 Isis was stocked with 200,000 sheep. A fire tore through the property shortly after shearing the same year, resulting in the destruction of the woolshed and 1,200 bales of wool.

The construction of the station woolshed was completed in 1914. It was the biggest in Queensland and the first to have electric shearing stands. When built the station occupied an area of 2,430 square kilometres (938 sq mi) and was stocked with 320,000 sheep. The stone and rammed earth jackaroo quarters were bulldozed some time after staff numbers fell below 40 in the 1960s.

In 1954 some 50,000 sheep were shorn at Isis Downs.

The Consolidated Pastoral Company acquired Isis Downs in 1987, at which time the property occupied an area of 1,227 square kilometres (474 sq mi) after a series of land resumptions by the state government for an estimated A$10 million.

Consolidated placed Isis Downs on the market following a decision by Kerry Packer to focus on beef cattle and meat processing operations. At the time the 2,200 square kilometres (849 sq mi) was stocked with 80,000 merino sheep and 10,000 mixed cattle, and was offered for an estimated A$20 million. The sale was not successful and in 2004 the company decided to remove all sheep from the 2,327-square-kilometre (898 sq mi) property and introduced 6,000 Charolais Brahman cross females with Angus bulls. The property has a carrying capacity of 24,000 head of cattle with an annual turn-off of around 10,000 cattle.

== See also ==
- List of ranches and stations
