= Barcoo =

Barcoo may refer to:

== Geography ==
- Shire of Barcoo, a local government area in Queensland, Australia
- Electoral district of Barcoo, Queensland, Australia
- Barcoo River, Queensland, Australia

== Ships ==
- HMAS Barcoo (K375), a Royal Australian Navy frigate
- SS Barcoo (1885), a passenger ship requisitioned by the Royal Australian Navy in 1914

== People ==
- Luq Barcoo (born 1998), American National Football League player

== See also ==
- Scortum barcoo, a fish species also known as the Barcoo grunter
- Barcoo fever, a formerly common Australian ailment
- Aussie salute or Barcoo salute, a gesture intended to keep bush flies from a person's face
- Gheorghe Barcu (born 1934), Romanian former footballer
