= Yaraka =

- Town
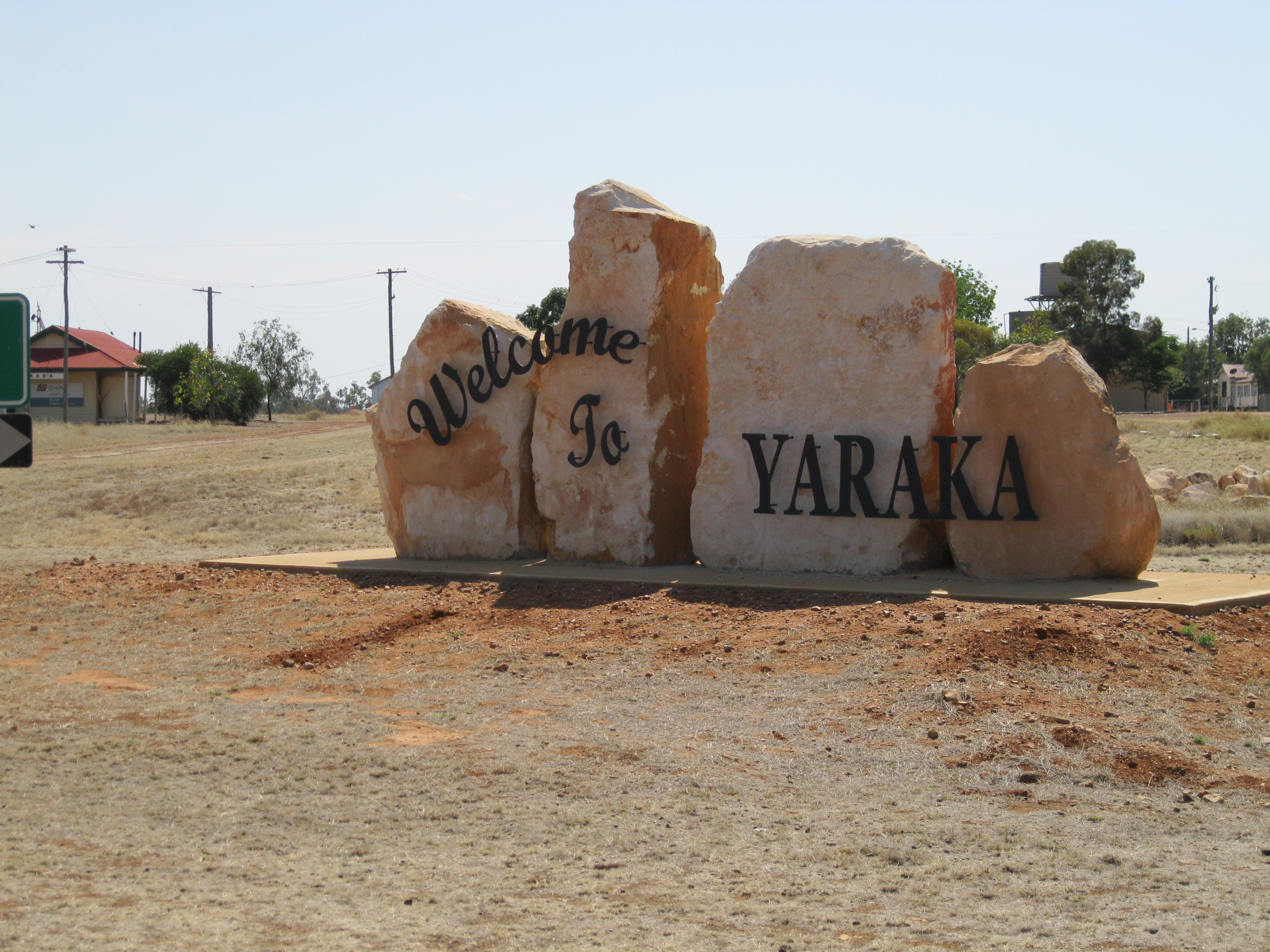
- Welcome to Yaraka sign

- Interactive map of Yaraka
- Coordinates: 24.8819°S 144.0780°E
- Country: Australia
- State: Queensland
- LGA: Longreach Region
- Location: 102 km (63 mi) SW of Isisford; 162 km (101 mi) WSW of Blackall; 219 km (136 mi) S of Longreach; 850 km (530 mi) WSW of Rockhampton; 1,126 km (700 mi) WNW of Brisbane
- Established: 1917

Government
  - State electorate: Gregory
  - Federal division: Maranoa

Area
  - Total: 1,274.5 km^{2} (492.1 sq mi)
- Elevation: 210 m (690 ft)
- Time zone: UTC+10:00 (AEST)
- Postcode: 4731
Localities around Yaraka
| Isisford | Isisford | Isisford |
| Jundah | Yaraka | Isisford |
| Jundah | Jundah | Isisford |

Yaraka is a rural town and locality in the Longreach Region of Queensland, Australia. Until 2021, the town of Yaraka was part of the locality of Isisford.

== Geography ==
Yaraka is in Central West Queensland, Australia. It was the terminus of a Yaraka branch railway line. It is located 220 kilometres (140 mi) south of Longreach, 165 kilometres (103 mi) west of Blackall and 100 kilometres (62 mi) south of the town of Isisford.

The landscape is an open Mitchell grass downs country, which provides good grazing country. Grey Range is located near Yaraka and is characterised by rocky ridges, spinifex grass and mulga.

The locality has the following mountains:

- Boundary Point (24.8338°S 144.3289°E) 402 metres (1,319 ft)
- Merry Peaks (24.9222°S 144.0817°E) 368 metres (1,207 ft)
- Mount Brookes (24.8032°S 144.0777°E) 379 metres (1,243 ft)
- Mount Margaret (24.9597°S 144.0937°E) 356 metres (1,168 ft)
- Mount Remarkable (25.0121°S 144.3064°E 320 metres (1,050 ft)
- Mount Slowcombe (24.8425°S 144.0577°E) 360 metres (1,180 ft)
- Sun Down Hill (25.0441°S 144.2584°E) 320 metres (1,050 ft)

== History ==
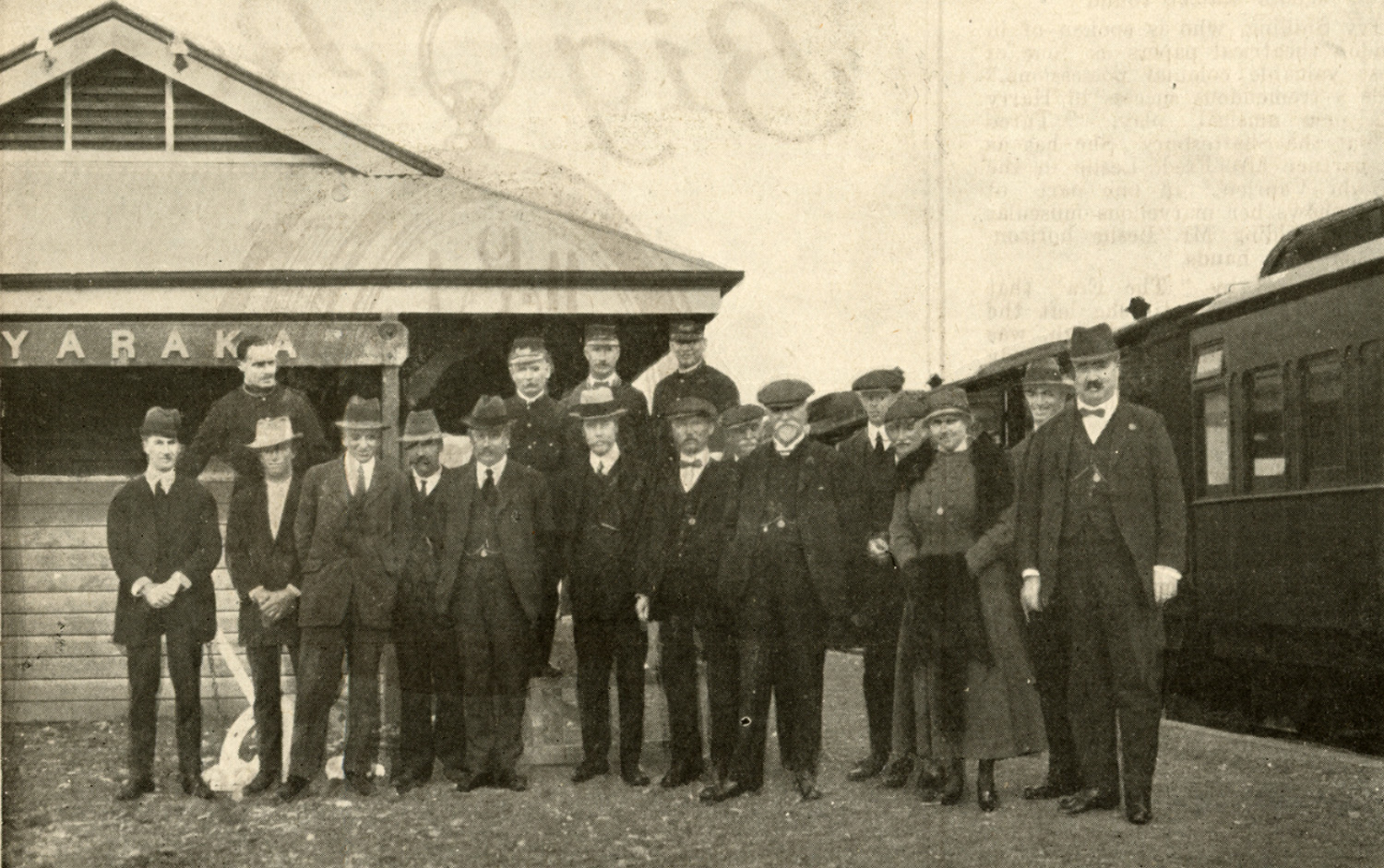
Yaraka Railway Station in 1917 shortly after the rail link was opened. The Queensland Premier, Mr T. J. Ryan visited the new site.

The first European to pass through the area was Edmund Kennedy in 1847. In 1860, graziers began to populate the area and farm sheep and cattle. In 1910, the Queensland Government authorised the building of the 2,060-kilometre (1,280 mi) railway line in Western Queensland to support the pastoral industry. However, only a quarter of the line was built and Yaraka became the end of the Yaraka branch railway line.

Yaraka became a town when the Yaraka branch railway line from Emmet opened in April 1917. The station was called Yaraka by the Queensland Railway Department who said it was the Aboriginal name meaning "of white spear grass which grows in the district" or referring to button grass Eleusine aegyptica.

Yaraka State School opened on 5 March 1920. It was mothballed on 31 December 2008 and closed on 31 December 2009. It was at 11 Quilp Street (24.8861°S 144.0754°E). The school's website was archived.

The town prospered for the next twenty years and in the 1930s had a population of about 100. In 1932 a journalist toured this area and described the town in the following terms.

"Yaraka: This little place is the end of the line, and enjoys the privilege of seeing one train a week. It is situated well down the Barcoo, about one hundred miles from where the rivers meet, and becomes Cooper's Creek.

No doubt people who live and work in isolated places such as this are entitled to more consideration than they receive. They certainly have courage and endurance above the average."

On Saturday 19 March 1932, a strong gale of wind during a storm blew the Church of England off its blocks and three houses lost their roof.

In the 1950s, the Yaraka railway station became a major centre for the transportation of cattle. In November 1953 over 5,442 cattle were handled which was the largest number since the line opened in 1917. It was noted that this was unusual in these country yards and that Yaraka was unsurpassed in this respect.

The line was officially closed on 14 October 2005 and has been dismantled. These days however Yaraka has become known as one of Queensland's 'vanishing towns' and its population is declining. In 2009, the school closed due to low student numbers. In 2014, the school building was gifted to the local community. In 2016 the community reopened the school with the children enrolled at Longreach School of Distance Education but locally assisted by a governess employed by the families.

In 1998, as part of his 'Pass the Hat Around' tour, Lee Kernaghan performed before an audience of 3,000 people in Yaraka, in order to raise money for a defibrillator for the medical clinic and to help the school.

On 10 September 2021, a new locality called Yaraka was created around the town of Yaraka, the land being excised from the locality of Isisford to avoid confusion and restore historical connections.

== Education ==
There are no schools in Yaraka nor nearby. The nearest government primary school is Isisford State School in Isisford, 102 kilometres (63 mi) to the north. The nearest government secondary school is Blackall State School in Blackall, 162 kilometres (101 mi) to the north-east. Distance education and boarding schools are the alternatives. The former Yaraka State School building at 11 Quilp Street (24.8860°S 144.0754°E) is available for children undertaking distance education to study together with the assistance of a governess.

== Amenities ==
There is a hotel providing accommodation.

Occasional services are held at the Anglican church in Quilp Street (24.8851°S 144.0757°E).

Other amenities operated by the Longreach Regional Council include a community hall, showgrounds, swimming pool, tennis courts and golf course.

== Attractions ==
Mount Slowcombe Lookout (24.8427°S 144.0580°E) is off the Emmet Yaraka Road has been described as "an ideal place to enjoy the stunning outback sunset or the glorious colours of a sunrise". The view takes in the Yanyang Range (24.9092°S 144.0997°E), Mount Brookes at 379 metres (1,243 ft) above sea level (24.8036°S 144.0781°E) and Fort Douglas at 321 metres (1,053 ft) above sea level (24.8975°S 143.9989°E), all with ever changing colours, shadows and shades. There is a sealed road and electric barbeque and picnic area at the summit. Nearby waterholes offer an abundance of bird and wildlife.

Magee's Shanty is the historic site of the shanty immortalised in Banjo Paterson's poem "A Bush Christening", There is also the ruins of the Cobb & Co pub and the lonely grave of gold miner Richard Magoffin who perished in 1885.

Yaraka Opal Field encompasses the mines within and west of the Macedon Range including Harlequin and Mount Tighe. It is known for top patterns and various types of opal in as many as eight levels. Mines include Spur, Polykettle, Cockatoo and Pretty Gully.

There are two national parks near Yaraka. Welford National Park is notable for golden-green spinifex, white-barked ghost gums and red sand dunes. A highlight of Idalia National Park are the dense Mulga woodlands and views.

Other attractions are fishing, exploring, wild life, and geology.

There are free caravan sites with water and electricity near the Yaraka Community Hall.

== Climate ==
Climate statistics include:

- Summer Average (day): Min temp=35.8⁰, Max temp=37.1⁰
- Summer Average (night): Min temp=21.9⁰, Max temp=22.9⁰
- Winter Average (day): Min temp=22.5⁰, Max Temp=25.1⁰
- Winter Average (night): Min temp=6.5⁰, Max Temp=7.9⁰
- Average annual rainfall: 451mm
