= Myalgia =

Painful sensations in muscle tissue

- Other names: Muscle pain, muscle ache
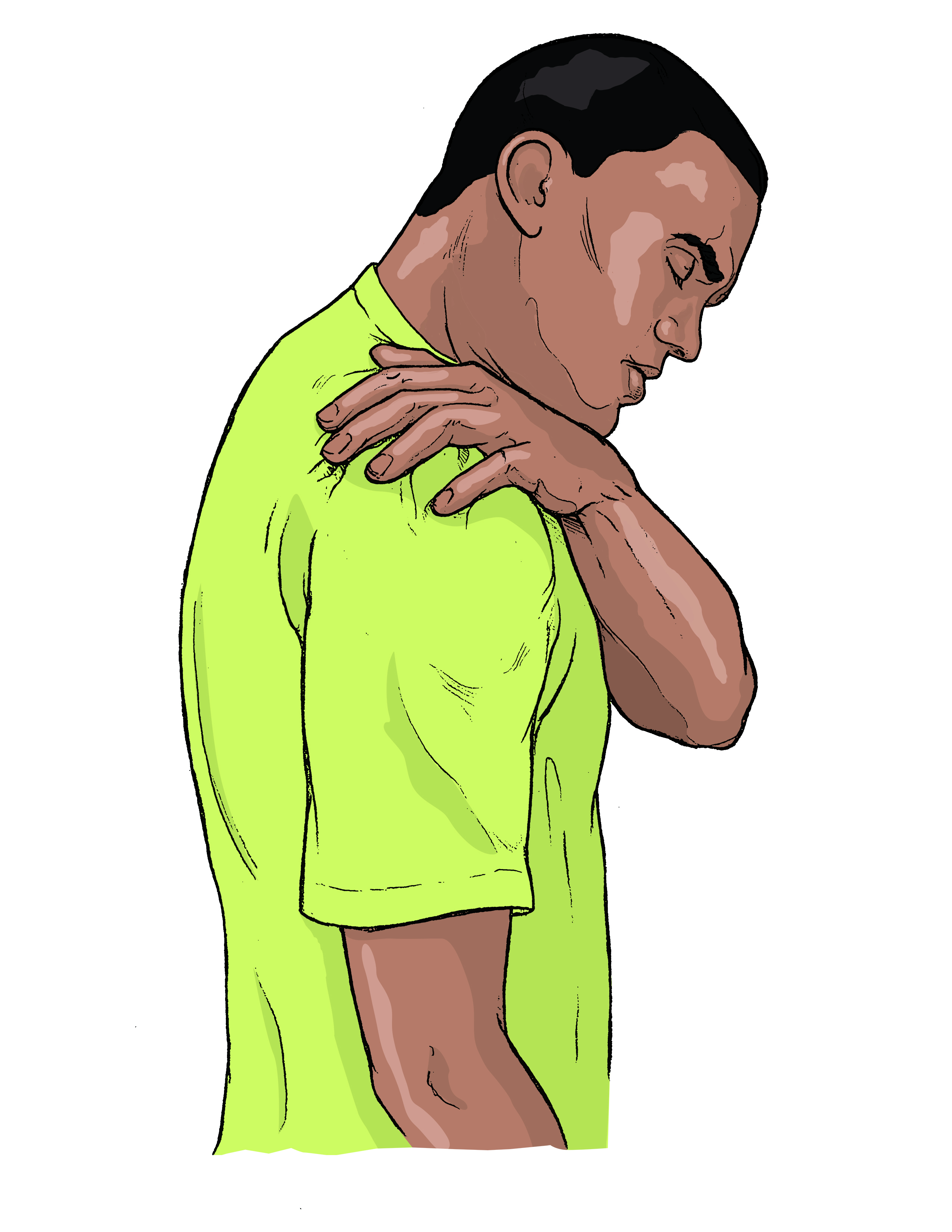
- One of the myalgic symptoms
- Specialty: Rheumatology

Myalgia or muscle pain is a painful sensation evolving from muscle tissue. It is a symptom of many diseases. The most common cause of acute myalgia is the overuse of a muscle or group of muscles; another likely cause is viral infection, especially when there has been no injury.

Long-lasting myalgia can be caused by metabolic myopathy, some nutritional deficiencies, ME/CFS, fibromyalgia, and amplified musculoskeletal pain syndrome.

== Causes ==
The most common causes of myalgia are overuse, injury, and strain. Myalgia might also be caused by allergies, diseases, medications, or as a response to a vaccination. Dehydration at times results in muscle pain as well, especially for people involved in extensive physical activities.

Muscle pain is also a common symptom in a variety of diseases, including infectious diseases, such as influenza, muscle abscesses, Lyme disease, malaria, trichinosis or poliomyelitis; autoimmune diseases, such as celiac disease, systemic lupus erythematosus, Sjögren's syndrome or polymyositis; and gastrointestinal diseases, such as non-celiac gluten sensitivity (which can also occur without digestive symptoms) and inflammatory bowel disease (including Crohn's disease and ulcerative colitis).

The most common causes are:

- Injury or trauma, including sprains, hematoma
- Overuse: using a muscle too much, too often, including protecting a separate injury
- Chronic tension

Muscle pain occurs with:

- Rhabdomyolysis, associated with:
  - Viral infections
  - Compression injury leading to crush syndrome
  - Drug-related
    - Commonly fibrates and statins
    - Occasionally ACE inhibitors, cocaine, and some retroviral drugs
  - Severe potassium deficiency
- Fibromyalgia
- Ehlers–Danlos syndrome
- Auto-immune disorders, including:
  - Mixed connective tissue disease
  - Systemic lupus erythematosus
  - Polymyalgia rheumatica
  - Polymyositis
  - Dermatomyositis
  - Multiple sclerosis (neurologic pain localised to myotome)
- Infections, including:
  - Influenza
  - Lyme disease
  - Babesiosis
  - Malaria
  - Toxoplasmosis
  - Dengue fever
  - Hemorrhagic fever
  - Muscular abscess
  - Compartment syndrome
  - Polio
  - Rocky Mountain spotted fever
  - Trichinosis (roundworm)
  - Ebola
  - COVID-19
- Other
  - Postorgasmic illness syndrome (POIS)

=== Overuse ===
Overuse of a muscle is using it too much, too soon or too often. One example is repetitive strain injury.

=== Injury ===
The most common causes of myalgia by injury are sprains and strains.

=== Autoimmune ===
- Multiple sclerosis (neurologic pain interpreted as muscular)
- Myositis
- Mixed connective tissue disease
- Lupus erythematosus
- Fibromyalgia syndrome
- Familial Mediterranean fever
- Polyarteritis nodosa
- Devic's disease
- Morphea
- Sarcoidosis

=== Metabolic defect ===
- Carnitine palmitoyltransferase II deficiency
- Conn's syndrome
- Adrenal insufficiency
- Hyperthyroidism
- Hypothyroidism
- Diabetes
- Hypogonadism
- Postorgasmic illness syndrome

=== Other ===
- Myalgic encephalomyelitis/chronic fatigue syndrome (ME/CFS)
- Channelopathy
- Ehlers–Danlos syndrome
- Stickler syndrome
- Hypokalemia
- Hypotonia
- Exercise intolerance
- Mastocytosis
- Peripheral neuropathy
- Eosinophilia myalgia syndrome
- Barcoo fever
- Herpes
- Hemochromatosis
- Delayed onset muscle soreness
- HIV/AIDS
- Generalized anxiety disorder
- Tumor-induced osteomalacia
- Hypovitaminosis D
- Infarction

=== Withdrawal syndrome from certain drugs ===
Sudden cessation of high-dose corticosteroids, opioids, barbiturates, benzodiazepines, caffeine, or alcohol can induce myalgia.

== Treatment ==
When the cause of myalgia is unknown, it should be treated symptomatically. Common treatments include heat, rest, paracetamol, NSAIDs, massage, cryotherapy and muscle relaxants.

== See also ==
- Arthralgia
- Myopathy
- Myositis
