= Isisford, Queensland =

Isisford
- Town
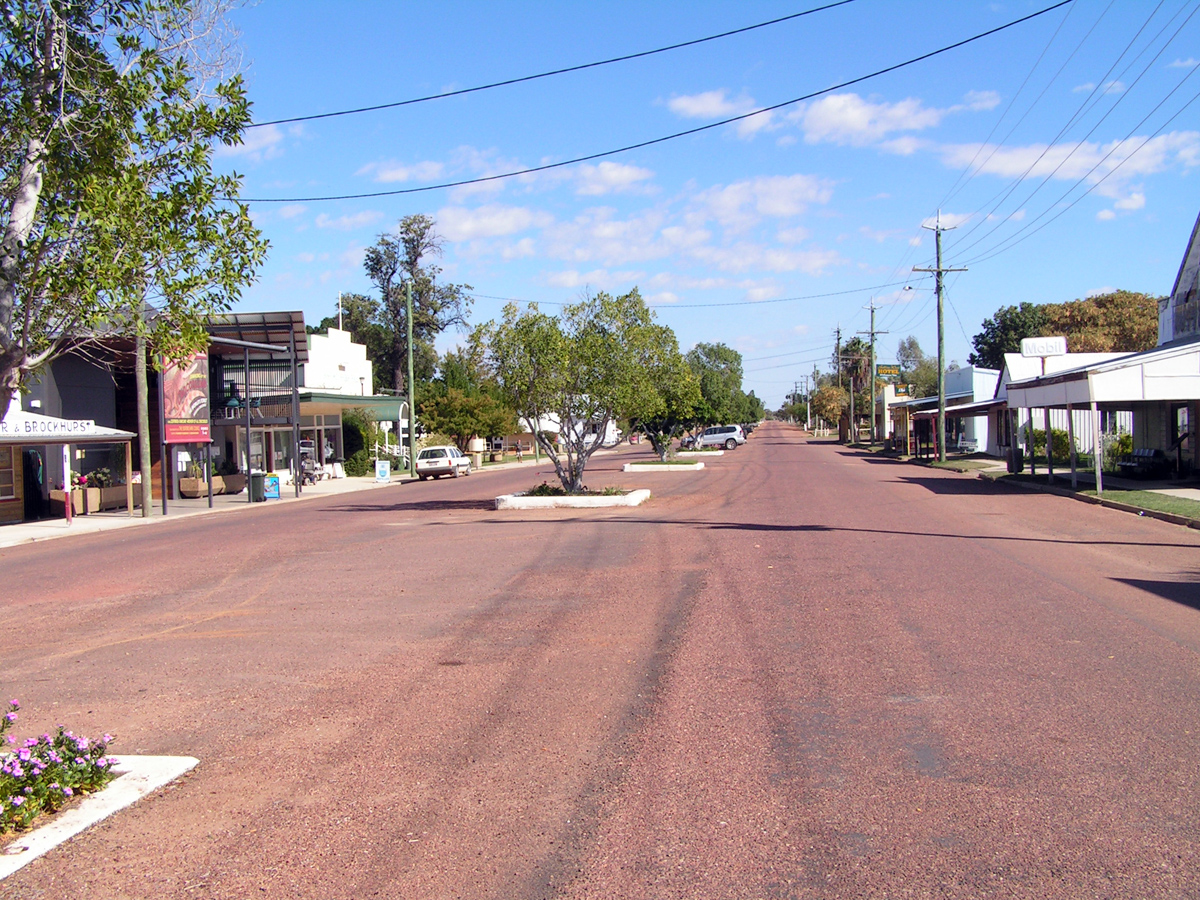
- Main street of Isisford

- Interactive map of Isisford
- Coordinates: 24.2597°S 144.4386°E
- Country: Australia
- State: Queensland
- LGA: Longreach Region
- Location: 117 km (73 mi) SSE of Longreach; 122 km (76 mi) WNW of Blackall; 748 km (465 mi) W of Rockhampton; 1,087 km (675 mi) WNW of Brisbane

Government
  - State electorate: Gregory
  - Federal division: Maranoa

Area
  - Total: 10,506.8 km^{2} (4,056.7 sq mi)
- Elevation: 202 m (663 ft)

Population
  - Total: 218 (2021 census)
  - Density: 0.02075/km^{2} (0.05374/sq mi)
- Time zone: UTC+10:00 (AEST)
- Postcode: 4731
- Mean max temp: 30.8 °C (87.4 °F)
- Mean min temp: 15.5 °C (59.9 °F)
- Annual rainfall: 449.8 mm (17.71 in)
Localities around Isisford
| Longreach | Ilfracombe | Ilfracombe |
| Stonehenge | Isisford | Blackall |
| Jundah | Yaraka | Adavale |

Isisford is a rural town and locality in the Longreach Region, Queensland, Australia. In the 2021 census, the locality of Isisford had a population of 218 people.

== Geography ==
Isisford is situated in Central Western Queensland on the Barcoo River, and is approximately 120 kilometres (75 mi) south east of the town of Longreach. The town of Emmet (24.6713°S 144.4763°E) is located 50 kilometres (31 mi) south of Isisford, and Yaraka (24.8819°S 144.0780°E) is located 102 kilometres (63 mi) to the south-west. Isisford–Blackall Road runs east from the town to the locality of Blackall.

Idalia National Park and Welford National Park are accessible from the town.

The following hills are near Isisford:

- Double Top (24.6832°S 144.6277°E) 469 metres (1,539 ft)
- Mount Aaron (24.8230°S 143.5810°E) 334 metres (1,096 ft)
- Mount Ellen (24.7901°S 144.3743°E) 427 metres (1,401 ft)
- Mount Grey (24.6482°S 144.6620°E) 426 metres (1,398 ft)
- Mount Malcolm (24.8581°S 144.5217°E)
- Mount Mingera (24.5113°S 143.9822°E) 219 metres (719 ft)
- Mount Misery (24.6726°S 143.8565°E) 236 metres (774 ft)
- Mount Moses (24.8148°S 143.6242°E)
- Mount Perrier (24.8489°S 143.6073°E) 337 metres (1,106 ft)
- Mount Slowcan (24.9757°S 144.4988°E)
- Mountain Black (24.3892°S 143.8336°E)
- Observatory Hill (24.8320°S 144.5383°E)
- Opal Hill (24.7302°S 143.6318°E) 301 metres (988 ft)
- Penny Knob (24.6933°S 144.5993°E) 391 metres (1,283 ft)
- The Sisters (24.8275°S 144.3899°E)
- Yellow Mountain (24.7097°S 143.6416°E) 330 metres (1,080 ft)

=== Climate ===
Climate data for Isisford Post Office (1991–2020 normals, extremes 1957–present)
| Month | Jan | Feb | Mar | Apr | May | Jun | Jul | Aug | Sep | Oct | Nov | Dec | Year |
|---|---|---|---|---|---|---|---|---|---|---|---|---|---|
| Record high °C (°F) | 47.0 (116.6) | 46.1 (115.0) | 44.6 (112.3) | 40.0 (104.0) | 36.4 (97.5) | 33.3 (91.9) | 33.4 (92.1) | 37.7 (99.9) | 41.0 (105.8) | 43.6 (110.5) | 46.0 (114.8) | 46.6 (115.9) | 47.0 (116.6) |
| Mean daily maximum °C (°F) | 37.2 (99.0) | 36.2 (97.2) | 35.1 (95.2) | 31.7 (89.1) | 27.0 (80.6) | 23.9 (75.0) | 23.8 (74.8) | 26.2 (79.2) | 30.4 (86.7) | 33.8 (92.8) | 35.9 (96.6) | 37.1 (98.8) | 31.5 (88.7) |
| Daily mean °C (°F) | 30.5 (86.9) | 29.6 (85.3) | 28.1 (82.6) | 24.2 (75.6) | 19.5 (67.1) | 16.2 (61.2) | 15.6 (60.1) | 17.4 (63.3) | 21.7 (71.1) | 25.6 (78.1) | 28.3 (82.9) | 30.0 (86.0) | 23.9 (75.0) |
| Mean daily minimum °C (°F) | 23.9 (75.0) | 22.9 (73.2) | 21.1 (70.0) | 16.7 (62.1) | 11.9 (53.4) | 8.5 (47.3) | 7.3 (45.1) | 8.5 (47.3) | 13.0 (55.4) | 17.3 (63.1) | 20.7 (69.3) | 22.9 (73.2) | 16.2 (61.2) |
| Record low °C (°F) | 14.7 (58.5) | 13.6 (56.5) | 4.0 (39.2) | 3.9 (39.0) | 1.4 (34.5) | −1.4 (29.5) | −1.7 (28.9) | −2.0 (28.4) | 1.6 (34.9) | 5.0 (41.0) | 7.0 (44.6) | 8.4 (47.1) | −2.0 (28.4) |
| Average precipitation mm (inches) | 77.3 (3.04) | 70.3 (2.77) | 43.1 (1.70) | 25.4 (1.00) | 18.0 (0.71) | 18.6 (0.73) | 12.7 (0.50) | 10.7 (0.42) | 21.8 (0.86) | 29.0 (1.14) | 49.3 (1.94) | 66.4 (2.61) | 442.6 (17.43) |
| Average precipitation days (≥ 1.0 mm) | 5.4 | 4.9 | 3.5 | 1.7 | 1.7 | 1.9 | 1.7 | 1.2 | 2.1 | 3.0 | 4.4 | 4.8 | 36.5 |
| Average dew point °C (°F) | 17.4 (63.3) | 18.0 (64.4) | 15.6 (60.1) | 11.5 (52.7) | 8.9 (48.0) | 6.9 (44.4) | 4.9 (40.8) | 4.2 (39.6) | 6.6 (43.9) | 9.3 (48.7) | 12.2 (54.0) | 15.7 (60.3) | 10.9 (51.6) |
Source 1: National Oceanic and Atmospheric Administration
Source 2: Bureau of Meteorology

== History ==
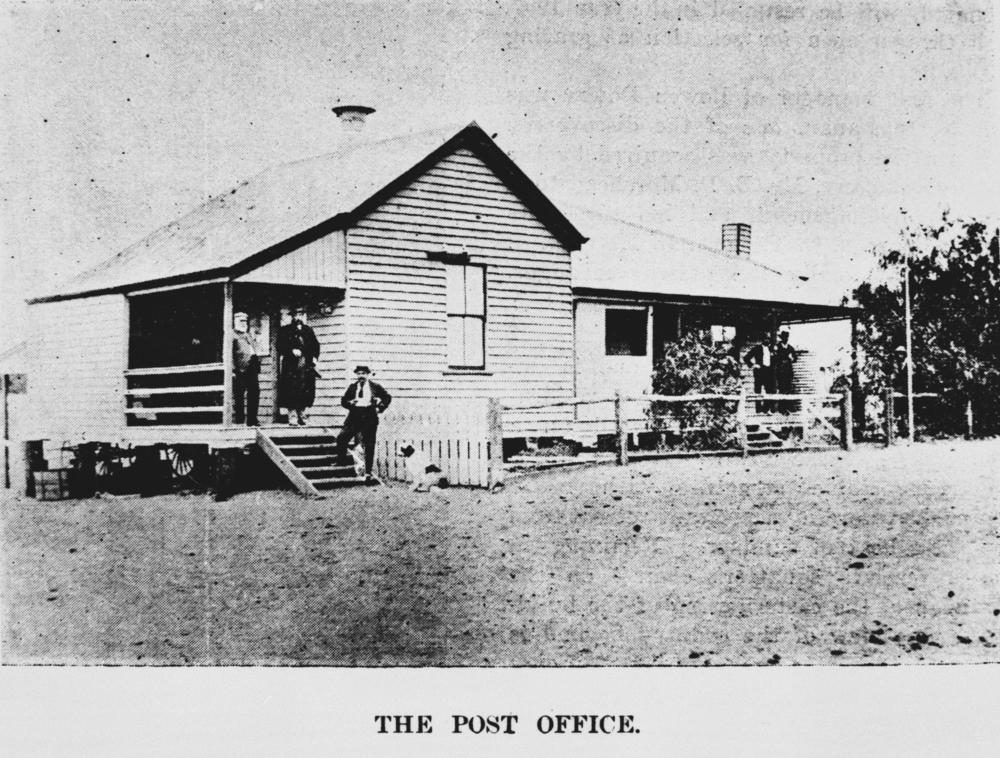
Post office, 1898

The Indigenous people of the Isisford region are known as the Kuungkari people. The first Europeans to enter the area were members of the expedition led by Thomas Mitchell, who journeyed through what is now Isisford in September 1846. Mitchell described a large native encampment being present with permanent huts and well-beaten pathways. The resident people were alarmed at the arrival of this group, and Mitchell continued through with little interaction. He made camp at a nearby lagoon, which he called Yuranigh's Pond, after Yuranigh, his Wiradjuri guide.

In 1847, Edmund Kennedy's exploratory group travelled through the region where he obtained the name of the Barcoo River from an old Kuungkari man living near Yuranigh's Pond. The expedition of Augustus Charles Gregory passed through the same area in 1858. While they were encamped, they fired a shot into the scrub to scare away the local Aborigines. In 1862, the expedition led by William Landsborough camped close to the same place and likewise felt threatened by the resident Kuungkari. A number armed with clubs and throwing sticks approached the camp and Landsborough ordered his men to fire. One Kuungkari man was shot dead and another wounded.

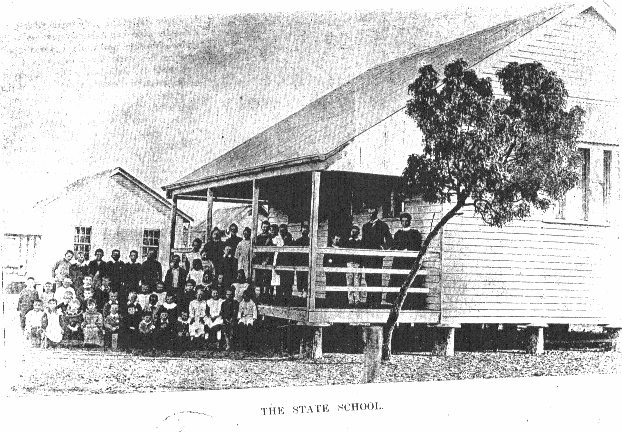
Isisford School building, 1883

British pastoralists began to enter the region in 1866 with John Charles Ellis and his brother Evelyn taking up land. They were sons of Charles Ellis, 6th Baron Howard de Walden and named their property Portland Downs after their maternal grandfather William Bentinck, 4th Duke of Portland. A year later, Charles Lumley Hill established the neighbouring Isis Downs property and John Fanning formed Ruthven. Frontier violence ensued with Fanning being killed in 1868 by resident Aboriginal men and another squatter named Richard Welford being killed in 1872. Punitive expeditions conducted by Native Police and local pastoralists such Charles Lumley Hill subsequently occurred, with many Indigenous people being shot.

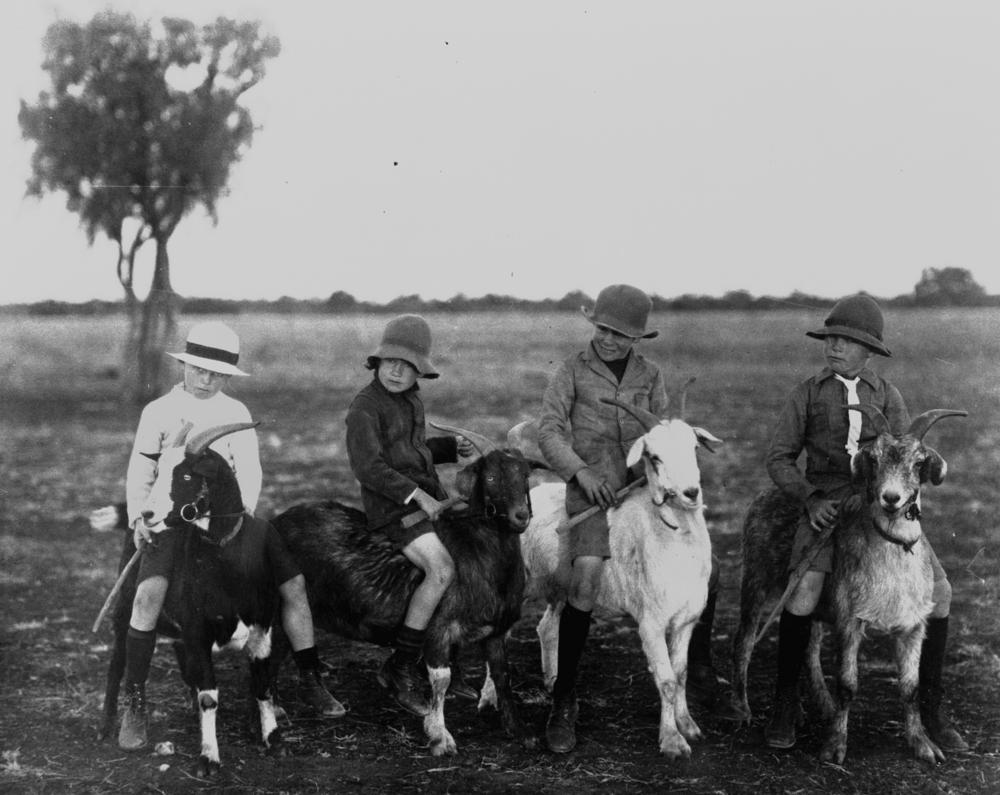
Four boys riding goats, Isisford, ca. 1918.

In May 1875, closer development started to occur with James Whitman opening a hotel, store and blacksmith. Land for the township of Whittington was reserved in 1877, and the town was surveyed as the Town of Wittown in April 1878; it is said that Whitman named it after himself.

Isis Downs Post Office opened on 1 June 1868 and was replaced by the Wittown office in 1876. However, in May 1878, the name Isisford was proposed and by August 1878 it had been renamed Isisford, because it was near the Isis Downs pastoral run and a ford on the Barcoo River. In the following years the town progressed with the growth of the pastoral industry. A post office and telegraph line were operating by 1881.

Isisford Private School opened in the 1870s. It was by operated by Mr R Venables. It closed when Isisford Provisional School opened on 19 October 1881 with Venables becoming its first teacher. Circa 1883 the provisional school became Isisford State School. In 1892 it became Isisford Provisional School, returning to state school status in January 1894.

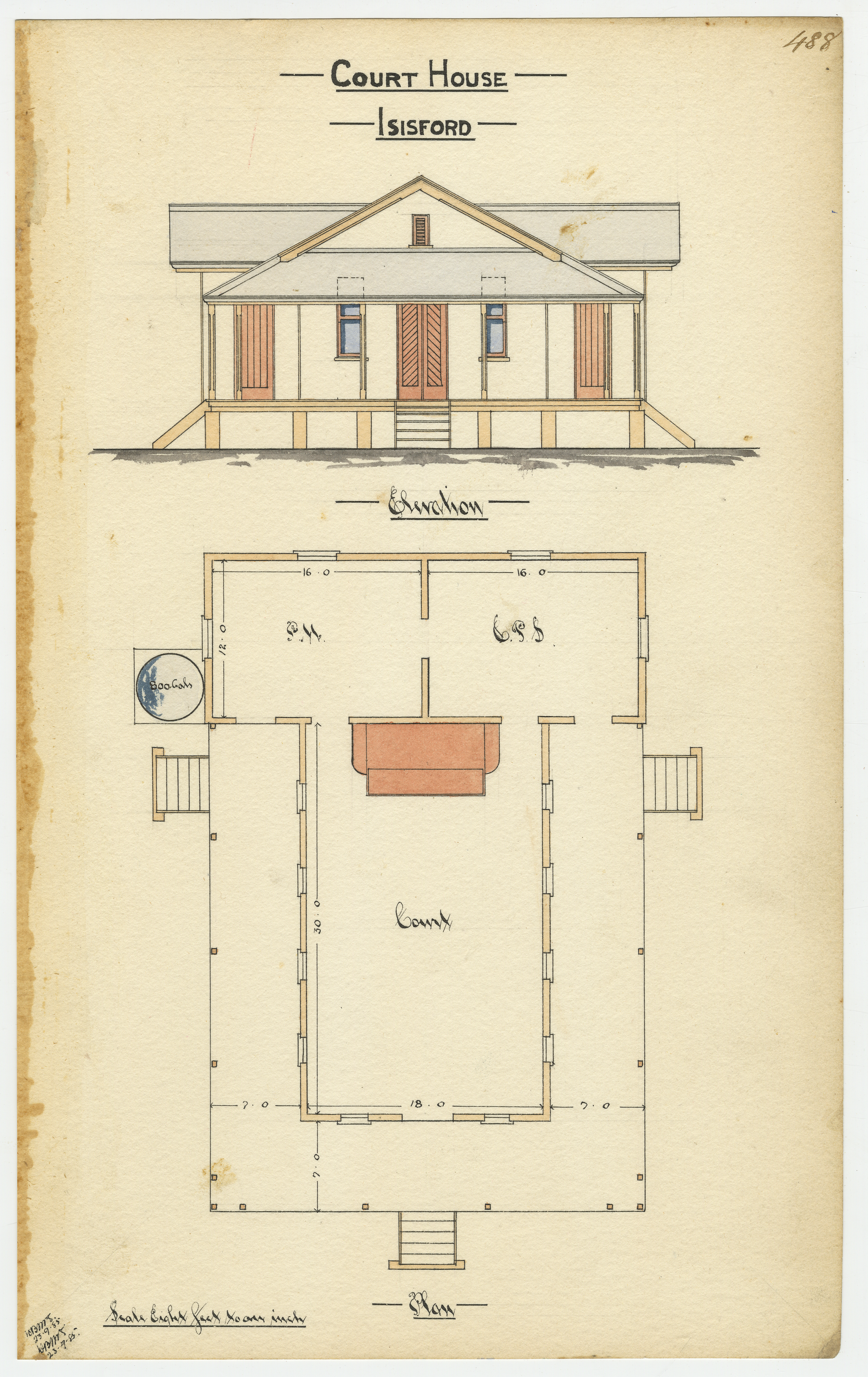
Architectural drawing of the court house, 1885

The Queensland Government called for tenders to build a court house in Isisford in August 1883 with the contract awarded to William McLaughlin in November 1883. The court house was completed in November 1885.

In April 1910, Isisford became the first town in Australia to be serviced by a motorised mail delivery (from Ilfracombe, 90 kilometres (56 mi) to the north). A plaque on the post office commemorates the centenary of the commencement of the service.

Isisford Convent School was established in 1950 by the Presentation Sisters. It closed in 1970.

In September 1956, a deliberately lit fire at the Isisford Hotel resulted in the deaths of a mother and her child.

In the mid-1990s, the first fossils of Isisfordia, an extinct genus of crocodile-like animals, was discovered in a dry creek close to the town. The discovery was made by the town's former Deputy Mayor, Ian Duncan, after which the new species was named.

On 10 September 2021, a new locality called Yaraka was created around the town of Yaraka, the land being excised from the locality of Isisford, to avoid confusion and restore historical connections.

== Demographics ==
In the 2011 census, the locality of Isisford and the surrounding area had a population of 262. This figure has never surpassed 300.

In the 2016 census, the locality of Isisford had a population of 218 people.

In the 2021 census, the locality of Isisford had a population of 218 people.

== Heritage listings ==
Isisford has a number of heritage-listed sites, including:

- Old Isisford District Hospital, 6 St Agnes Street
- Isis Downs Woolshed, Isisford-Blackall Road

== Education ==
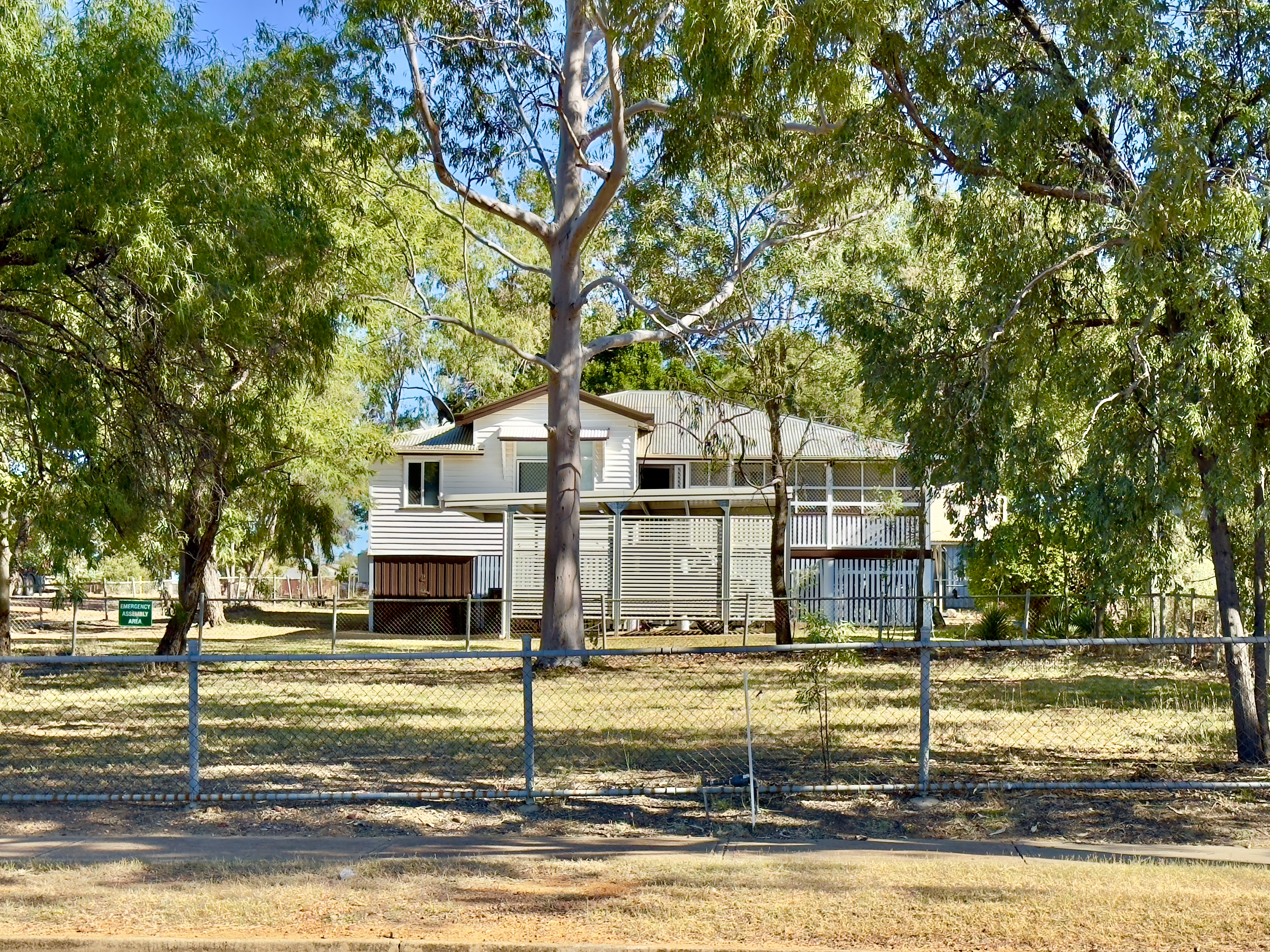
Isisford State School, 2024

Isisford State School is a government primary (Prep-6) school for boys and girls at 14 St Helena Street (24.2602°S 144.4395°E). In 2018, the school had an enrolment of 9 students with 2 teachers and 4 non-teaching staff (2 full-time equivalent).

There is no secondary school in Isisford. The nearest government secondary schools are in Longreach and Blackall but are sufficiently distant that distance education and boarding school would be alternatives.

== Amenities ==
Isisford has a public library at 20 St Mary Street operated by the Longreach Regional Council.

It also has a swimming pool and visitor information centre.
