= The Longreach Leader =

Daily newspaper in Longreach, Australia

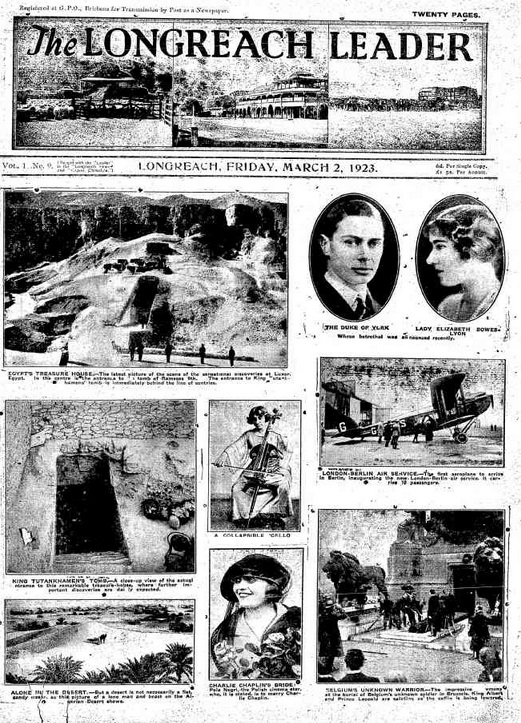
Front page of The Longreach Leader, 2 March 1923

The Longreach Leader is a newspaper published in Longreach, Queensland, Australia.

== History ==
The first issue was published on 5 January 1923.

In early October 2021 the owners of the paper advised that production of the weekly paper would be suspended, after 98 years, due to financial losses primarily caused by shrinking advertising revenue. The last edition prior to the suspension will be published on Friday 15 October 2021. The publisher hopes to restructure the company and the newspaper and bring it back in a sustainable manner.

== Digitisation ==
The papers have been digitised as part of the Australian Newspapers Digitisation Program of the National Library of Australia.
