= Blackall and Yaraka Branch Railways =

Railways lines in Central West Queensland, Australia

The Blackall and Yaraka Branch Railways are railway lines in Central West Queensland, Australia. The former branch connected the small town of Jericho on the Central Western railway line with Blackall and the latter branch connected Blackall to the even smaller town of Yaraka. Blackall was named after Sir Samuel Wensley Blackall who from 1868 to 1871 was the second Governor of Queensland.

== History ==
In the late 1890s it was government policy that Queensland's three major trunk lines should be extended to the south-west in order to link vast remote areas with the coast. Those trunk routes were the Western line which then ran from Brisbane to Charleville, the Central Western Line from Rockhampton to Longreach and the Great Northern line running from Townsville to Hughenden. The Western line was extended south-west to Cunnamulla and opened in 1898 whilst in 1917 the Quilpie Line was opened from Westgate (south of Charleville) due west to Quilpie. The Great Northern line was extended south-west to Winton and opened in 1899.

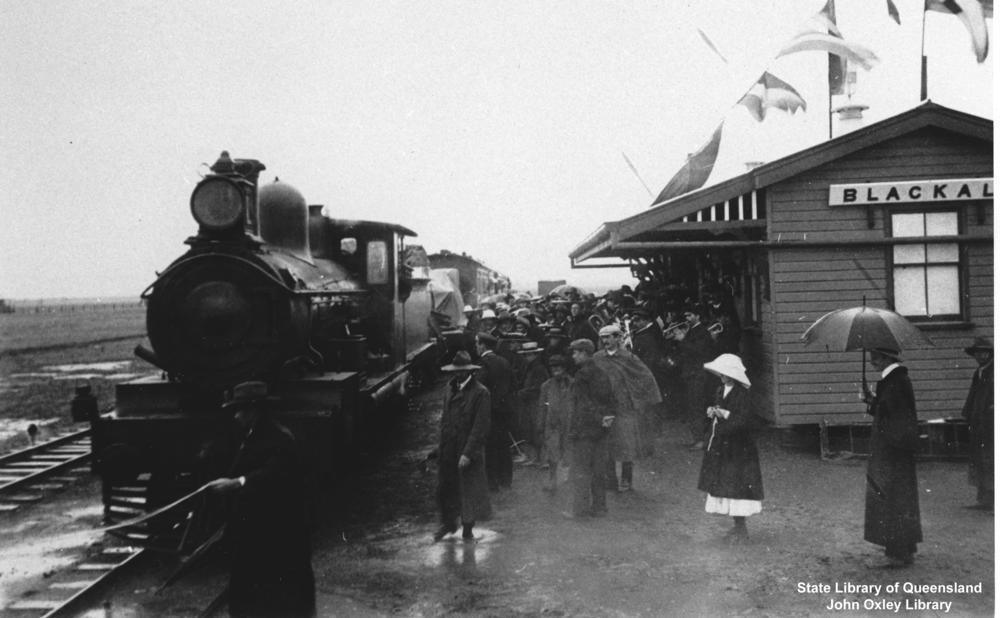
Opening of the Blackall line, 1908

Extending the Central line was more problematic. Residents of the Jundah and Windorah regions (along the Thomson River south-west of Longreach) jostled for a line in their direction to run from Dartmouth, 50 kilometres east of Longreach via Stonehenge to Jundah and Windorah. Meanwhile, Longreach residents preferred an extension north-east to Winton thus providing a link to the Great Northern Line. An alternative option to the south-west was therefore examined being a line from Barcaldine or Jericho (both further east of Longreach) down to Blackall the oldest town in the region. Although Barcaldine was fractionally closer to Blackall than Jericho, the latter prevailed because most of the land over the Barcaldine route had already been settled. The Blackall Branch was therefore approved in 1905 and had the potential to be further extended south-west to Yaraka, Windorah and beyond. The branch was 114 kilometres (71 mi) long and opened on 31 March 1908. Tiny sidings appeared en route at Joycedale, Lancevale, Yalleroi and Glenusk.

Because Jericho had no depot, a thrice weekly service ran from nearby Alpha east of Jericho. Blackall passengers heading to Rockhampton usually changed trains at Jericho. In 1952, a weekly mixed Rockhampton to Blackall service commenced as did a second weekly service in 1967. The services ended in 1970 when The Midlander service could be met at Jericho for a more comfortable trip to and from Rockhampton.

By all accounts, the Blackall Branch was reasonably well patronised but traffic inevitably declined when road transport increased. It faced closure in the early 1990s but earned a reprieve after staunch local opposition. The seasonal transport of cattle became its main source of activity but by 2005 the branch and its extension to Yaraka were untenable.

The Queensland Parliament passed the Great Western Railway Act in 1910. Its purpose was to authorize construction of over 2,000 kilometres (1,200 mi) of railway in far western Queensland so as to bring all sheep farming activities in the region within reach of a railway and hence eastern markets. The line was to run from Tobermory in the far south-west to Camooweal in the far north-west. Tobermory lay to the south of Quilpie and Eromanga whilst Camooweal sat to the north-west of Mount Isa and not far from the Northern Territory border. The proposed line would also double as a link in a grand plan to link Sydney by rail with Darwin. Also required were four spur lines to join the existing Queensland system at Charleville, Blackall, Winton and Malbon near Cloncurry on the Great Northern Line.

In the end, the concept of the Great Western Railway was unrealistic and uneconomic. But some construction work was completed including extension of the Blackall Branch to Yaraka (and proposed to reach Windorah). The line opened in four stages – to Malvernton (via Glenstuart siding) on 16 June 1913, to Benlidi shortly after on 1 July 1913, to Emmet (via Mekaree siding) on 16 December 1914 and to Yaraka (via Ungo and Konupa sidings) on 3 April 1917. Roughly 300 kilometres separated Blackall and Windorah, and Yaraka was about halfway.

A twice weekly mixed service plied the Yaraka Branch. It was slow at six hours but worse was a trip between Yaraka and Rockhampton at twenty-six hours although that included a through service between Alpha and Yaraka. The service was later cut back to once per week. As with the Blackall Branch the line faced closure in the early 1990s but earned a reprieve after local opposition. The ‘Yaraka Mixed’ later achieved novelty status as one of the last of its kind but by April 2001 passengers were not permitted aboard and by September 2005 had closed completely. As compensation for the closure, the locals were promised all-weather road upgrades in the region.

As an aside, the Central Western Line was eventually extended from Longreach and opened to Winton in 1928.

== See also ==
- Construction of Queensland railways
