= Isis Downs Woolshed =

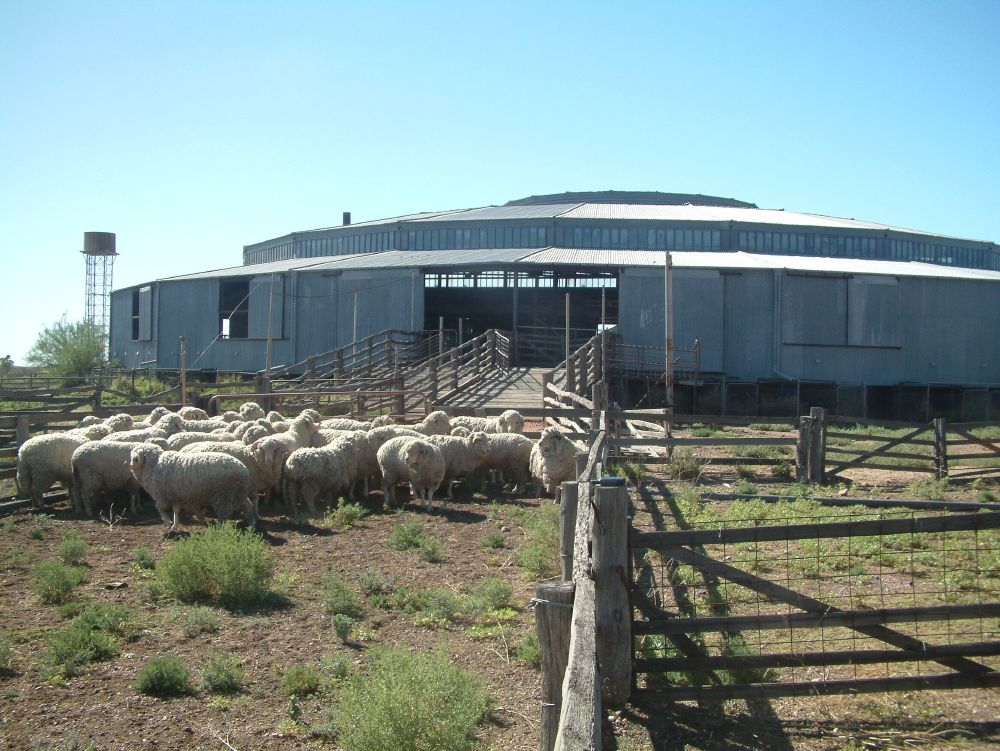
- Isis Downs Woolshed

- Location within Queensland Location within Australia
- 24.219°S 144.6275°E
- Location: Isisford-Blackall Road, Isisford, Longreach Region, Queensland, Australia

History
- Design period: 1914 - 1919 (World War I)
- Built: 1913-1914

Site notes
- Architect: Kay, MacNicol and Company Engineers

Queensland Heritage Register
- Official name: Isis Downs Woolshed Complex, Isis Downs Woolshed
- Type: state heritage (built)
- Designated: 18 September 2008
- Reference no.: 602544
- Significant period: 1910s (fabric); 1910s-2000s (historical use)
- Builders: Dorman Long and Co. (Melbourne)

Isis Downs Woolshed is a heritage-listed shearing shed at Isisford-Blackall Road, Isisford, Longreach Region, Queensland, Australia. It was designed by Kay, MacNicol and Company Engineers and built from 1913 to 1914 by Dorman Long and Company (Melbourne). It was added to the Queensland Heritage Register on 18 September 2008.

== History ==
The current Isis Downs Woolshed was completed in 1914. A prefabricated steel structure clad with corrugated iron, the shed was designed by Kay, MacNicol and Company Engineers for the then property owners, Sir Rupert Clarke and Robert Selmon Whiting. Although smaller than the previous shed that had burnt down, the current shed's design is unique, creating a large semi-circular internal space.

The Queensland wool industry commenced in 1840 when Patrick Leslie and his brother Walter Leslie established Canning Downs Station on the Darling Downs. Pastoralists followed explorers in opening up the land for utilization and by 1860 wool had become the primary export earner for the newly established colony of Queensland.

Isis Downs was one of the first properties to be established in the Isisford District of far west Central Queensland. The initial lease commenced on 1 January 1867 and was held by Charles Lumley Hill, W St John Holberton and W B Allen. The run was named after the Isis River in England, which is actually the upper reaches of the Thames River. Following the taking up of pastoral properties throughout the area, a town was founded by William and James Whitman in 1877 to provide essential services for the district. It had various early names including Whittown, Wittown or Whittington, but in 1897 was officially named Isisford, as it was near to a ford and not far from Isis Downs Station.

Isis Downs changed hands a number of times before Robert Selmon Whiting and Sir Rupert Clarke acquired it in 1910. The eldest son of a prominent Victorian family, Sir Rupert Clarke was the 2nd Baronet of Rupertswood and held vast pastoral holdings across the Australian colonies. His father, William John Clarke, appears to have owned Isis Downs for 6 years from 1877, but let it go. Clarke's long standing business partner, RS Whiting, was a wealthy Melbourne based solicitor. The Clarke-Whiting partnership acquired vast land holdings in Queensland, including Isis Downs, Avington, Emmet Downs, Stockbury, Brynhyfryd, and Bellevue/Kiama in the Isisford area, Sedgeford near Alpha, and Albina near Springsure. Of all their holdings, both in Queensland and elsewhere in Australia, Isis Downs was regarded as their "masthead" sheep station.

By 1910 Isis Downs had grown to over 200,000 hectares (490,000 acres) and carried a similar number of sheep. At that time the shearing shed on Isis Downs was a rectangular-shaped timber and corrugated iron structure with a central arched spine. Erected in the late nineteenth century, it contained 100 shearing stands and was larger than the current shed, but it was destroyed by fire in September 1912, immediately after the close of the shearing season.

By December 1912 the owners had commissioned Melbourne engineers Kay, MacNicol and Company to design a new shearing shed. A number of designs were considered but by late December the current structure was chosen as the "cheapest and simplest form of construction". The designers argued that "the use of one big pillar 30 feet above the ground and sunk to about five feet below, would provide a clear space of about 70 feet to cover shearing board, tables, bins etc". The design allowed for 52 shearing stands around the semi-circle, with the sheep-yards on the immediate exterior. On the flat, far side of the building were the wool bins and presses. A separate engine room provided its own electricity, with the lighting supplemented by clerestory windows. Large, rectangular ventilation shutters were spaced around the curved facade of the building providing more light when open.

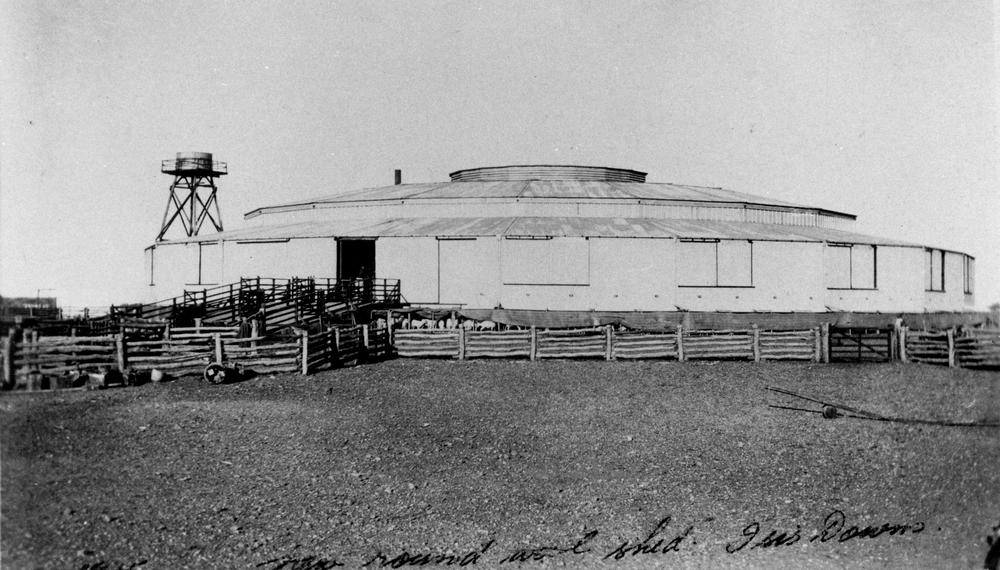
New round woolshed, 1915

Steel was ordered from Dorman Long and Co. of Melbourne in January 1913, the same company that later built the Sydney Harbour Bridge. The steel could not be produced in Australia at that time and therefore had to be shipped from Middlesbrough (England) to Melbourne to be cut and prepared as per the design. It was then shipped to Rockhampton and moved by rail to Malverton, near Blackall. From there, the steel was carted to the property and installed under the supervision of the property manager, Mr Frank Luck. Construction commenced in 1913 and by April the foundations were well advanced; however, completion was delayed due to the late arrival of the steel. The shed was not complete by the 1913 shearing season, forcing the owners to make temporary alternative arrangements.

Adjacent to the woolshed a powerhouse was constructed to supply electric and hydraulic power for the various machines used in the clip. The interior of the Isis Downs powerhouse contained both a boiler room and a generating room. The generating room accommodated an Austral Otis hydraulic pump (which was coupled to an external accumulator) and a single cylinder reciprocating vertical steam engine that was attached to an electric generator. The system produced DC power for the Falkiner Boll shearing machines and hydraulic power for the wool presses, bale dump and hoist. Power was transmitted via a power-board in the powerhouse and a distribution-board in the woolshed. A diesel generator was eventually installed, followed by a belt driven set which was powered by a twin cylinder motor within the skillion annex; these systems were eventually superseded in the 1970s with the introduction of 240 volt electric power.

By April 1914 the shed itself had been completed and the machinery installed, but the external pens had not been completed and the shorn sheep chutes had not arrived. The external pens were designed to hold thirty thousand sheep, with an anticipated daily tally of five thousand sheep during the peak season. Accessing sufficient timber for the construction of the pens was a major logistical issue, as the nearest natural supply was 25 miles (40 km) away. The shed, yards and powerhouse were finally completed in July 1914, at a total cost of £18,000.

Whiting and Clarke were known as innovators and had a substantial impact upon the station. In addition to the shearing shed, they built the homestead, sank 3 artesian bores, dug a 192 kilometres (119 mi) network of bore drains and introduced a 110-horsepower road train (imported from England). Their descendants held the property until 1979.

Isis Downs had substantial impact upon the development of the region. Before World War II approximately 150 permanent staff and numerous seasonal workers were employed at Isis Downs, undertaking the variety of tasks necessary to run the property, including the outstations. Increasing mechanisation drastically reduced permanent staff levels, which had a negative effect upon the local economy and community.

Environmental and economic factors led to varying stock numbers over the years. In the late 1950s only 60,000 head of sheep were grazed on the station, but by the 1990s stock numbers had risen to 100,000, due in part to the acquisition of surrounding properties. Stock levels eventually declined as the current owners moved toward cattle grazing. As sheep numbers fell, the shearing season became smaller and the final clip was made in May 2004 with less than 30,000 sheep.

In recent years the Isis Downs Shearing Shed has been used to host events such as the Queensland Conservatorium Symphony Orchestra (2003) and the Outback Opera in the Shearing Shed (2005).

== Description ==
The Isis Downs Woolshed complex is located on the Isisford-Blackall Road approximately 20 kilometres (12 mi) east of the township of Isisford, within the homestead complex of the Isis Downs Station. The complex consists of the shearing shed (completed with mechanical shearing motors and wool presses), holding yards, powerhouse (with an extensive array of machinery and infrastructure) and a stand-alone bale hoist, located in close proximity to each other, and which were used conjointly to clip and process the fleeces.

=== Woolshed ===
The dominant feature of the complex is the woolshed. A large, high-set semi-circle with a low-set section along the rear wall, the woolshed's curved exterior faces the property entrance. The whole is clad in corrugated iron and crowned by a three-tiered roof. The upper two levels of the roof are progressively smaller raised semi-circles that sit in the centre of the roof and do not extend back to the rear wall. These provide light and ventilation to the large interior space via clerestory windows and louvres.

In the centre of the front curved wall is a central double-door entry that is met by the holding yard ramp. The sliding doors are rectangular and clad entirely in corrugated iron. Ten smaller sliding ventilation shutters of similar design are evenly spaced in the curved facade, five on either side of the double doors. At the rear ground level of the woolshed is another central double sliding door, clad in corrugated iron.

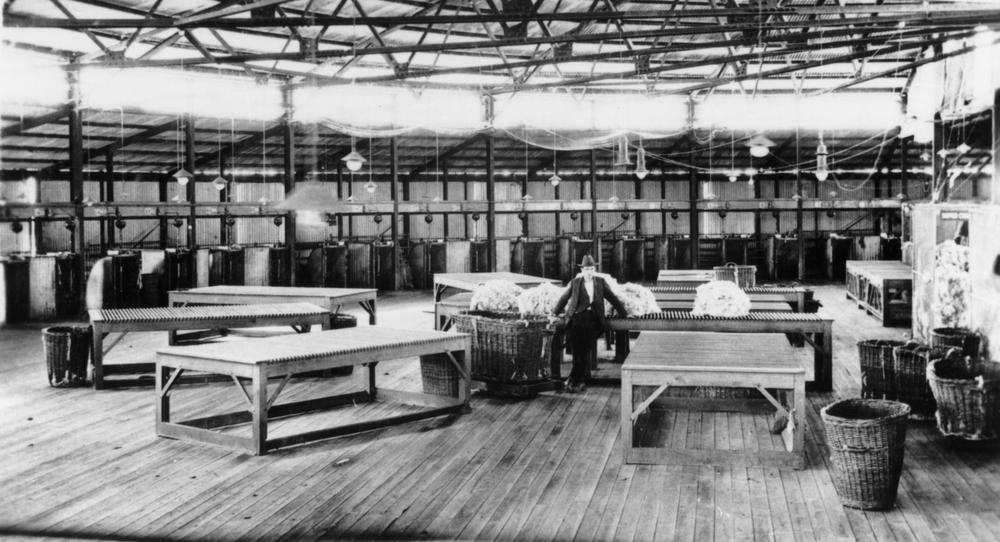
Interior view, circa 1925

Internally, the woolshed has two levels - the main floor, high-set, of timber construction, and semi-circular; and a much smaller ground level floor, of concrete, along the rear, straight wall. There are no internal wall or roof linings, leaving the shed structural components clearly visible. The woolshed has a steel superstructure, with a central pillar that sits directly under the apex of the roof; located at the mid-rear point of the top roof tier. Steel web trusses radiate out from the central pillar over a clear space of 70 feet (21 m). The trusses terminate at supporting steel posts, which frame the 52 shearing bays that follow the curve of the semicircle. Mechanical shearing motors are mounted on the tally boards above each bay, with smaller holding pens located between the bays and the exterior wall. The current motors are modern upgrades but an example of an original motor survives within the shed. The large open space between the central pillar and the bays was used to sort and class the fleeces. Wool presses are located on the rear edge of the timber floor and extend down to the narrow concrete ground level.

=== Holding Yards ===
Immediately abutting the curved wall of the woolshed is a series of timber let-out pens. The pens lead into "counting-out" yards that surround the curved face of the shearing shed. The larger series of holding yards extending beyond the "counting-out" yards are not included in the heritage boundary. A large timber forcing-up ramp gives access from the yards into the central opening of the woolshed.

=== Powerhouse ===
The powerhouse is a simple rectangular building with a gable roof located at the rear of the woolshed, in the north-eastern corner of the complex. With the exception of a small number of windows and fixed louvres, the powerhouse is clad almost entirely in corrugated iron. A tall metal chimney extends out of the north-eastern corner of the roof and is supported by four cable ties. A smaller corrugated iron skillion shed extends from the northern corner.

The powerhouse has two internal sections: a boiler room and a generating room, and still contains an extensive array of the machinery used during the woolshed's operation. The boiler room contains a wood-fired boiler and a high pressure water pump. External to the boiler room is a hydraulic accumulator and nearby, a ship's tank. Identified equipment within the generator room includes:

- Southern Cross Mark YEB engine, 1200 RPM, manufactured by the Toowoomba Foundry
- 240 volt, KW HP 12, continuous current generator manufactured by The British Thomson-Houston Co. Ltd
- Lister alternator manufactured by Higgs Motors of Dursley, England
- a generator manufactured by Ransomes, Sims & Jefferies of Ipswich, England
- a hydraulic pump manufactured by The Austral Otis Engineering Co. Ltd of Melbourne and Sydney

The powerhouse also retains much of the associated infrastructure such as pipes and the power board.

=== Bale Hoist ===
The bale hoist was used to load bales of wool onto transports and is located on the rear eastern side of the woolshed, adjacent to the powerhouse. The hoist is made from steel and consists of a vertical upright with a horizontal arm at the top. The arm is supported by decorative steel bracing. Part of the hydraulic power network, the hoist had a single cable that operated through a series of sheaves; the lower sheave is now missing. Historical evidence suggests a ball weight was mounted above the hoist hook, which was heavy enough to pull the cable to the ground and force the piston into position for the next lift. The vertical upright of the hoist is supported by two angled steel braces.

== Heritage listing ==
The Isis Downs Woolshed was listed on the Queensland Heritage Register on 18 September 2008 having satisfied the following criteria.

The place is important in demonstrating the evolution or pattern of Queensland's history.

The Isis Downs Woolshed Complex (constructed 1913–1914) is important in demonstrating the evolution of sheep shearing processes in Queensland, and in particular of early mechanised shearing.

The powerhouse is important in demonstrating the generation of non-grid electricity in remote and regional Queensland prior to World War I. The introduction of both hydraulic and electrical generating systems specifically for a shearing shed was only possible at the largest and most progressive sheep stations.

The place demonstrates rare, uncommon or endangered aspects of Queensland's cultural heritage.

The large and distinctive semi-circular prefabricated shearing shed is the only example of its type in Australia. The collection of associated machinery within the complex is also "unique" in terms of its composition and condition.

The place is important in demonstrating the principal characteristics of a particular class of cultural places.

The Isis Downs Woolshed Complex is important in demonstrating the principal characteristics of a large, early twentieth century shearing operation, comprising shearing shed (completed with mechanical shearing motors and wool presses), holding yards, powerhouse (with an extensive array of associated machinery and infrastructure) and bale hoist. The place was and remains one of the largest and most intact early twentieth century shearing complexes in Queensland, of exceptional value in contributing to our understanding of early mechanised shearing in Queensland.

The place is important because of its aesthetic significance.

Although designed as a utilitarian structure, the size and semicircular layout of the shearing shed at Isis Downs makes a dramatic visual impact against the flat, unwooded landscape. The use of corrugated iron cladding coupled with the setting of the Isis Downs Woolshed Complex within a flat, open landscape, evokes a strong sense of isolation.

The place is important in demonstrating a high degree of creative or technical achievement at a particular period.

The Isis Downs Woolshed is an innovative approach to design of large-scale pastoral infrastructure in Queensland. The use of prefabricated steel for the superstructure, unusual semi-circular shape, the provision for light and ventilation, is a unique attempt to address the functional, financial and logistical issues associated with a large shearing shed.

The place has a special association with the life or work of a particular person, group or organisation of importance in Queensland's history.

The Isis Downs Woolshed complex has a special association with the business partnership of Sir Rupert Clarke and Robert Whiting who played a significant role in the development of the region and were known nationally as major figures in the Australian pastoral industry.
