= Emmet, Queensland =

Emmet Isisford, Queensland
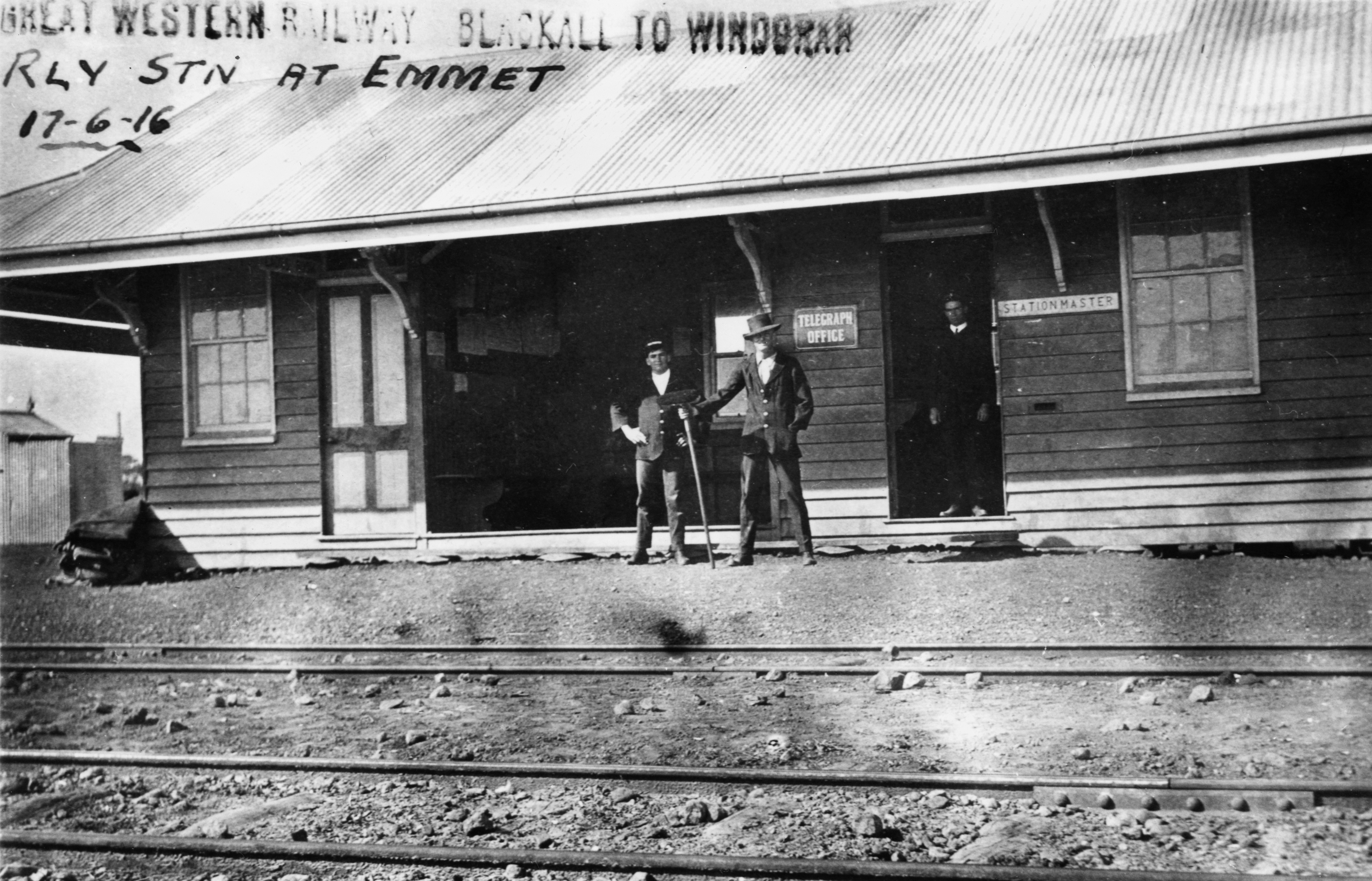
- Railway workers on the Emmet Railway Station platform, 1916

- Coordinates: 24.6714°S 144.4764°E
- Postcode(s): 4730
- Time zone: AEST (UTC+10:00)
- Location: 50.6 km (31 mi) S of Isisford; 167 km (104 mi) S of Longreach; 723 km (449 mi) WSW of Rockhampton; 1,074 km (667 mi) WNW of Brisbane
- LGA(s): Longreach Region
- State electorate(s): Gregory
- Federal division(s): Maranoa

Emmet is a ghost town in the rural locality of Isisford in the Longreach Region of Queensland, Australia. In 2023, the town had a population of two people.

== History ==
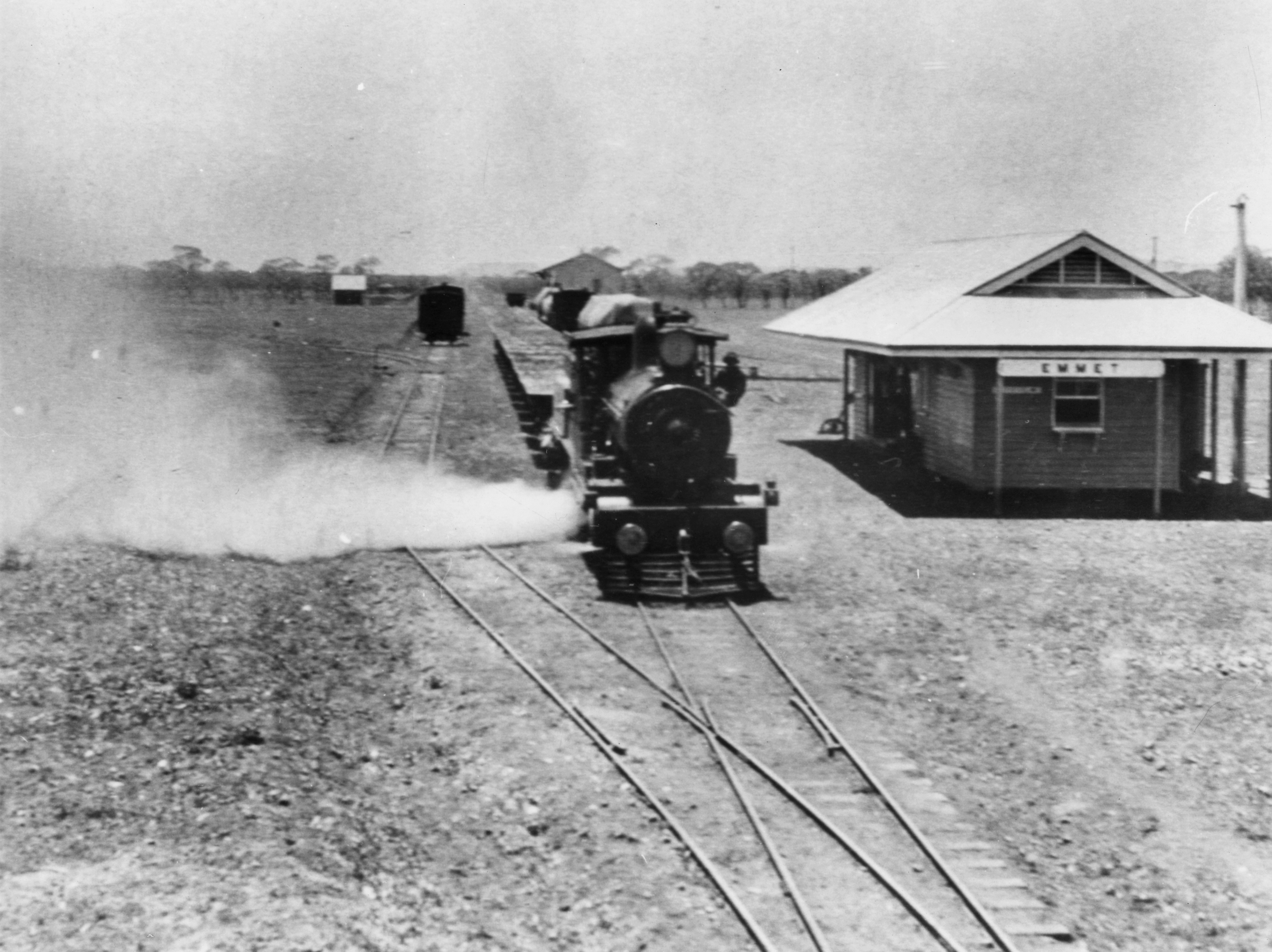
Steam train leaving Emmet railway station, circa 1919

Emmet was once a prosperous town built around the Emmet railway station (24.6685°S 144.4773°E) on the Blackall and Yaraka Branch railway.

== Attractions ==
The site now contains a picnic shelter and a small museum that is housed in the former railway station building. Its relative proximity to the Idalia National Park makes it a popular stopping off point for tourists.
