= Barcoo River =

River in Queensland, Australia

Coordinates: 28°29′S 137°46′E

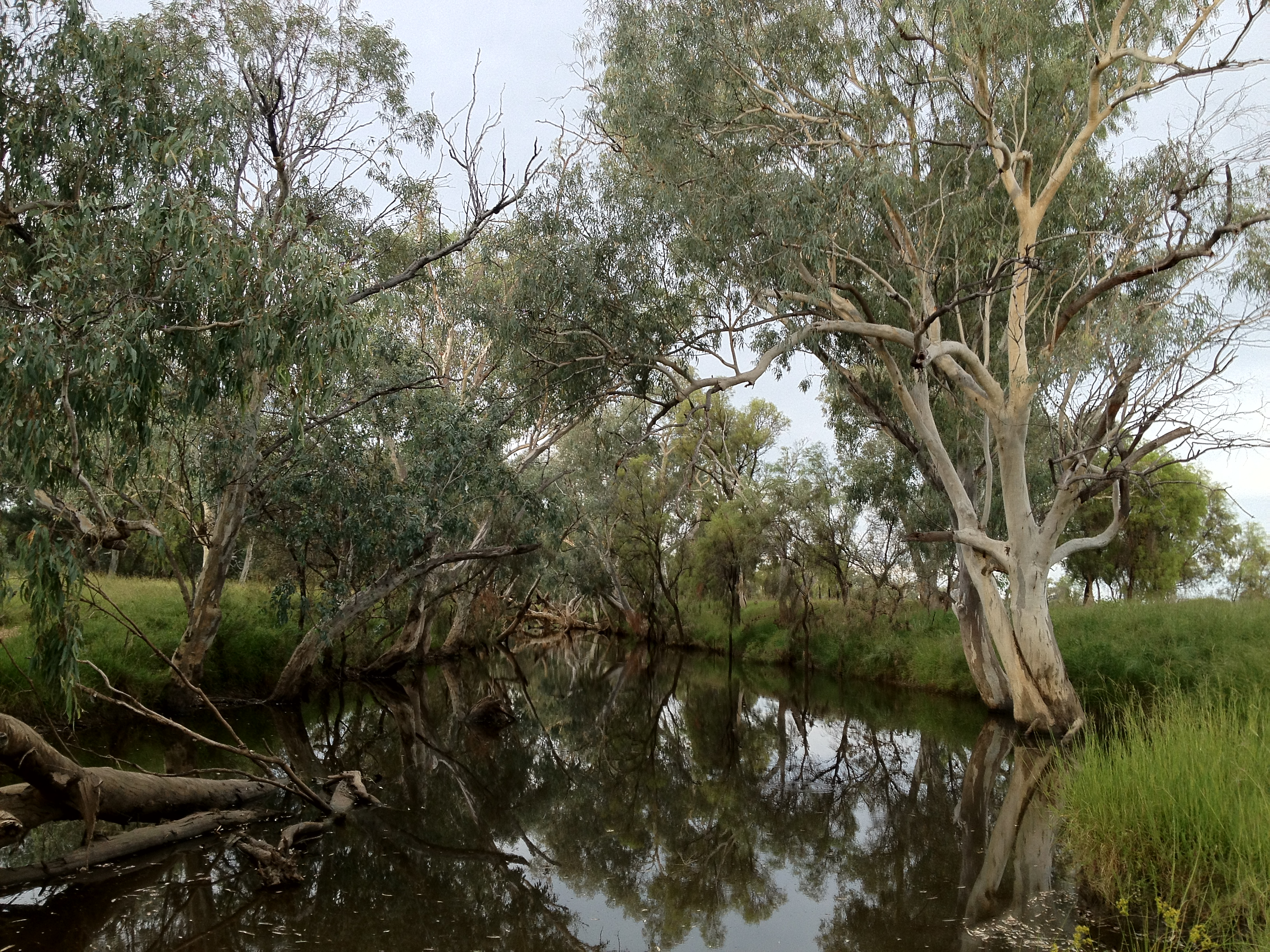
- Barcoo River at Tambo, 2012

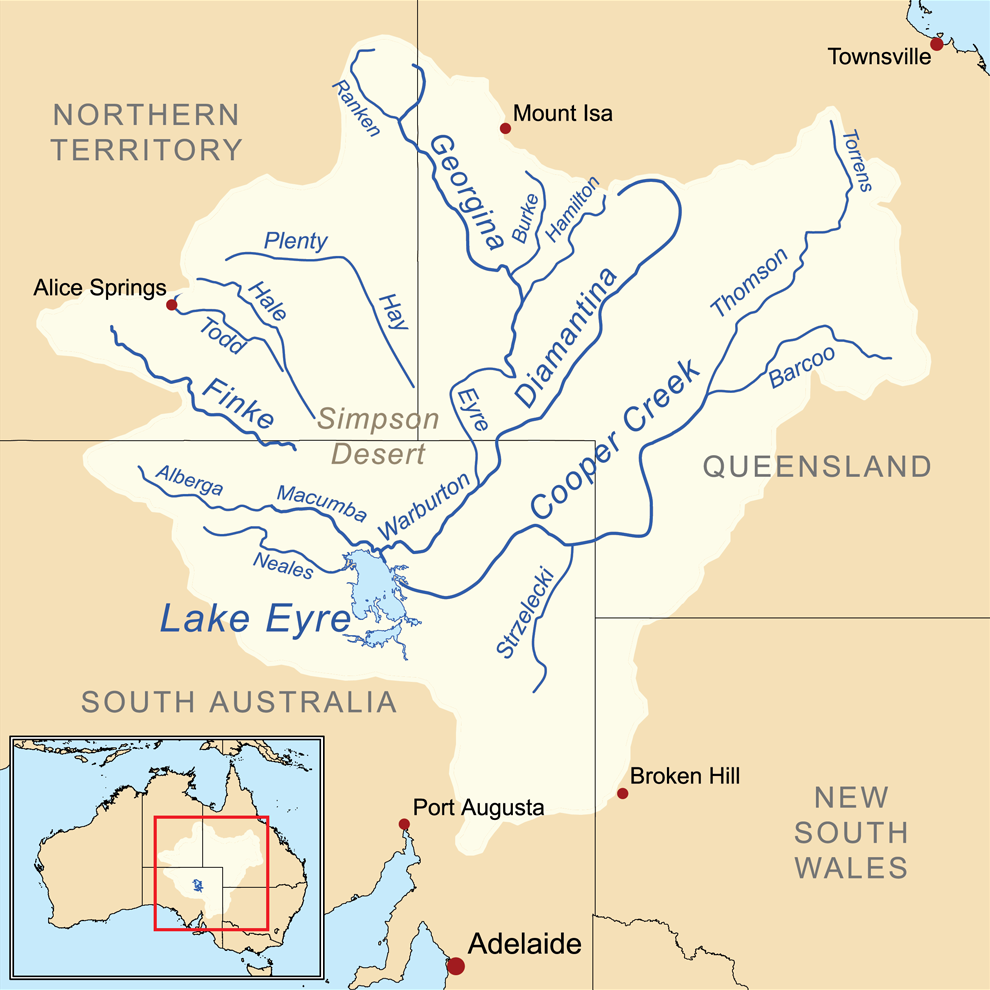
- Map of the Lake Eyre Basin showing Barcoo River

Location
- Country: Australia
- State: Queensland
- City: Blackall, Isisford, Tambo, Queensland

Physical characteristics
- Source: Warrego Range
  - location: east of Tambo, Central Queensland
- Mouth: confluence with the Thomson River
  - location: north of Windorah

Basin features
- River system: Cooper Creek, Lake Eyre basin

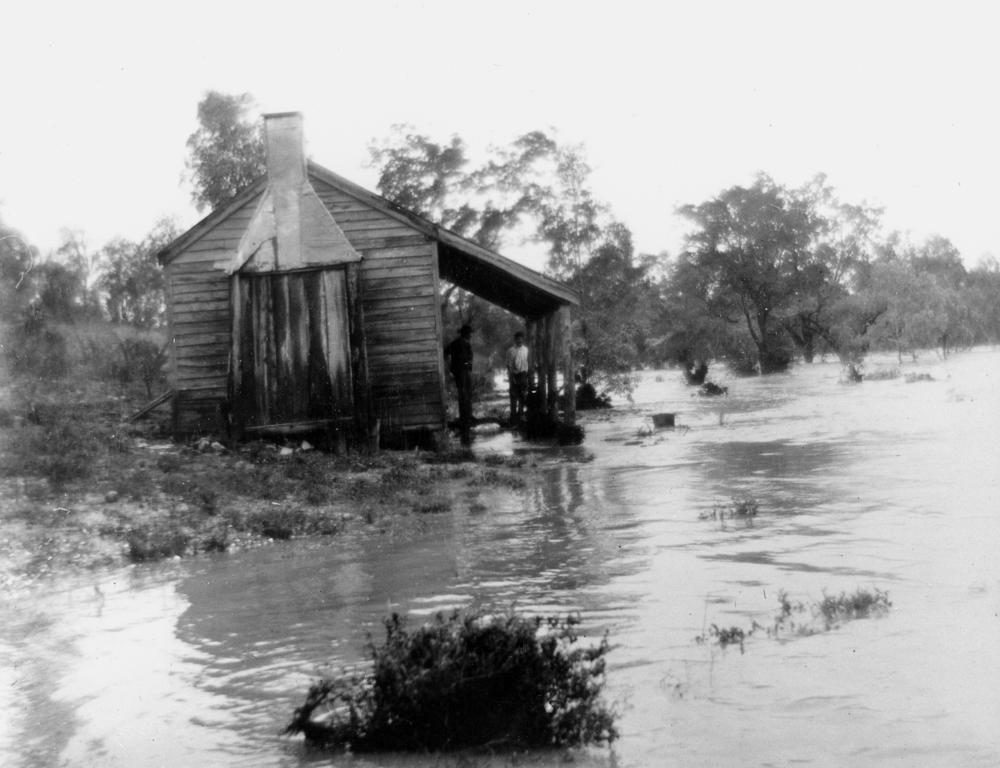
House flooded by the Barcoo River, 1906.

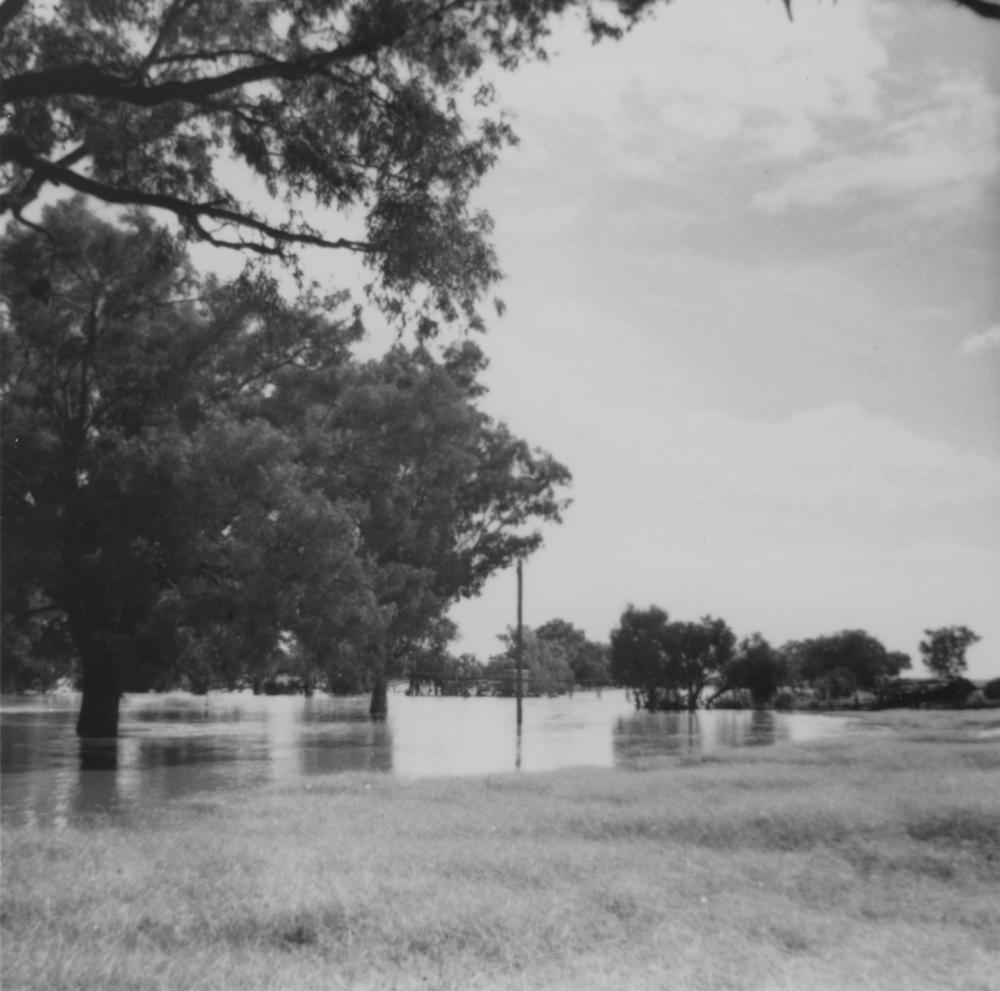
Flood in the Barcoo River, Blackall district, February 1941

The Barcoo River in western Queensland, Australia rises on the northern slopes of the Warrego Range, flows in a south-westerly direction and unites with the Thomson River to form Cooper Creek. The first European to see the river was Thomas Mitchell in 1846, who named it Victoria River, believing it to be the same river as that named Victoria River by J. C. Wickham in 1839. It was renamed by Edmund Kennedy after a name supplied by local Aborigines.

The waters of the river flow towards Lake Eyre in central Australia while those of rivers further east join the Murray-Darling basin and reach the sea in South Australia. The river forms a boundary between outback Australia and the "Far Outback"; legend has it that west of the Barcoo there is very little in the way of civilisation.

Tributaries include the Alice River Towns situated on the banks of the Barcoo River include Blackall, Isisford, Tambo and Retreat. The southern boundary of Welford National Park is marked by the Barcoo River and Isisford Weir has been constructed on the Barcoo.

== Barcoo grunter ==
The Barcoo grunter, also known as jade perch (scortum barcoo), is a native Australian freshwater fish found in the eastern Northern Territory rivers of Limmen, Roper, Macarthur; the Barkley Basin, and between the Gilbert River in Northern Queensland and the Lake Eyre drainage of central Australia. Barcoo Grunter is an excellent food fish, and is often farmed in intensive grow-out ponds or tanks in aquaculture.

== Disease ==
The river, or at least the district, also gives its name to several diseases, once widespread in outback Australia but now largely unknown. One is "Barcoo rot", a skin disease, perhaps similar to "desert sore", characterised by crusted impetiginous skin sores and occurring in association with heat, dirt, minor traumas and a diet chronically deficient in fresh fruit and vegetables. A second is "Barcoo fever" in which the sufferer experiences fever, nausea and vomiting which was exacerbated by the sight or smell of food, and constipation. This disease, once common in the outback, has also vanished. It may have been due to drinking water contaminated by cyanobacterial (blue-green algal) toxins. Provision of more reliable food supplies and safer sources of water in the "far Barcoo" may explain why these diseases have now all but disappeared.

The name also appears in the phrase "the Barcoo salute" – brushing the ever-present bush flies from the face with either hand.

== Literary references ==
The Barcoo is mentioned in some poems of Banjo Paterson. Examples are in the second stanza of Saltbush Bill and the first stanza of A Bush Christening.

The Barcoo is also referenced in Slim Dusty's song, "Mad Jack's Cockatoo", in the second line of the first verse.

Now Saltbush Bill was a drover tough as ever the country knew,
He had fought his way on the Great Stock Routes from the sea to the big Barcoo;
He could tell when he came to a friendly run that gave him a chance to spread,
And he knew where the hungry owners were that hurried his sheep ahead;
He was drifting down in the Eighty drought with a mob that could scarcely creep
(When the kangaroos by the thousand starve, it is rough on the travelling sheep),
And he camped one night at the crossing-place on the edge of the Wilga run;
"We must manage a feed for them here," he said, "or half of the mob are done!"

– Saltbush Bill

On the outer Barcoo where the churches are few,
And men of religion are scanty,
On a road never cross'd 'cept by folk that are lost,
One Michael Magee had a shanty.

– A Bush Christening

There's a man that went out in the flood time and drought,
By the banks of the outer Barcoo,
And they called him Mad Jack cause the swag on his back,
Was the perch for an old cockatoo.

— "Mad Jack's Cockatoo"

== See also ==
- List of rivers of Australia
