= Barcoo fever =

Illness once common in the Australian outback

Barcoo fever is an illness once common in the Australian outback that is now virtually unknown. It was characterised by nausea and vomiting exacerbated by the sight or smell of food and, unlike the usual gastro-intestinal infections, by constipation rather than diarrhoea. Fever and myalgia were also symptoms. Some additional symptoms of Barcoo fever include diarrhea, dyspepsia, liver failure, abdominal pain, prolonged enteritis, weight loss, lethargy, and malaise. Severe cases developed inanition and even death. It was seen in travelers in the outback rather than in cities or towns, but occasionally entire settlements were affected, such as occurred in Toowoomba in 1903. The aboriginal population knew to avoid the ailment by not drinking from certain water sources and by taking water from soaks or pits dug in the dry sandy bed of a stream.

It is postulated that the disease may be due to ingestion of cyanobacterial (blue-green algal) toxins, in particular cylindrospermopsin, a toxin from Cylindrospermopsis raciborskii and other cyanobacteria, which is a hepatotoxin. The symptoms of the disease are consistent with a hepatitis or liver disorder, and Cylindrospermopsis is known to be widespread in inland Australian water sources. The toxin is not destroyed by boiling and, although it would flavor water, this flavor would be masked by tea, the common beverage in the Australian bush. Provision of safe drinking water sources in Australia, with the development of bores and covered tanks to collect rainwater, explain the demise of a once-common illness.
