= List of museums in Queensland =

This list of museums in Queensland, Australia contains museums that are defined for this context as institutions (including nonprofit organizations, government entities, and private businesses) that collect and care for objects of cultural, artistic, scientific, or historical interest and make their collections or related exhibits available for public viewing. These also include non-profit art galleries and university art galleries. It covers museums in all local government areas in Queensland apart from those in the City of Brisbane.

== Museums ==
Name	Location	Area	Coords	Type	Summary
5th Light Horse Museum	Gympie	Wide Bay–Burnett		Military	
A.A. Cassimatis Store and Cottage	Muttaburra	Central West	22.5930°S 144.5464°E	History	Period general store and cottage
Abbey Museum of Art and Archaeology	Caboolture	South East	27.0709°S 153.0228°E	Archaeology	Archaeology and art of Ancient Greece, Rome, Egypt, prehistoric era, Medieval and Renaissance periods
Agnes Water Museum	Agnes Water	Capricorn Coast	24.2123°S 151.9101°E	Local history	operated by the Discovery Coast Historical Society
Aramac Tramway Museum	Aramac	Central West	22.9752°S 145.2462°E	Railway	
Archer Park Rail Museum	Rockhampton	Capricorn Coast	23.3758°S 150.5069°E	Railway	Historic rail station, features working steam rail tram
Army Museum of North Queensland	Townsville	Townsville	19.2399°S 146.8043°E	Military	History of the Australian Army in North Queensland, located in Kissing Point Fortification
Artspace Mackay	Mackay	Capricorn Coast	21.1431°S 149.1825°E	Art	
Australian Age of Dinosaurs	Winton	Central West	22.4791°S 143.1827°E	Natural history	Australian natural history of dinosaurs
The Australian Armour and Artillery Museum	Cairns	Cairns Region	16.8503°S 145.6951°E	Military	Tanks, armoured vehicles and artillery from the Second World War period and post war
Australian Rodeo Heritage Centre	Warwick	Darling Downs	28.2091°S 152.0340°E	History	history of rodeo and the cowboy
Australian Stockman's Hall of Fame	Longreach	Central West	23.4441°S 144.2747°E	History	Pioneers of the Australian outback, Australian stockmen and Aborigines, history of the Royal Flying Doctor Service of Australia
Australian Sugar Heritage Centre	Mourilyan	Tropical North	17.5817°S 146.0412°E	Agriculture	sugar farming and processing
Australian Workers Heritage Centre	Barcaldine	Central West	23.5535°S 145.2871°E	History	exhibits about Australia's working men and women, teachers, power workers, railway workers and others
Bakers Military Memorabilia Museum	Childers	Wide Bay–Burnett	25.2366°S 152.2798°E	Military	Private collection of military items, photos and memorabilia
Barcaldine Museum	Barcaldine	Central West		Local history	
Barcoo Shire Museum	Jundah	Central West	24.8297°S 143.0606°E	Local history	The museum is in the former administration centre of the Baroo Shire Council, which was relocated to the corner of Macrossan and Miles Streets.
Bauple Museum	Bauple	Queensland	25.8133°S 152.6176°E	Local history Bauple and Tiaro	
Beaudesert Museum	Beaudesert	South East	27.9916°S 152.9958°E	Local history	operated by the Historical Society of Beaudesert, features agricultural machinery and tools, horse-drawn farm vehicles
Beenleigh Historical Village and Museum	Beenleigh	South East		Open air	Features twenty heritage buildings with original items used by those who lived in the 1860s and onward
Blackwater International Coal Centre	Blackwater	Capricorn Coast		Mining	coal mining in Australia
Bollon Heritage Centre	Bollon	South West	28.0316°S 147.4806°E	Local history	
Boondooma Homestead	Proston	Wide Bay–Burnett		Historic house	mid 19th century homestead
Boulia Heritage Complex	Boulia	Central West		History	
Brennan & Geraghtys Store	Maryborough	Wide Bay–Burnett	25.542°S 152.6966°E	History	Operated by the National Trust of Queensland, includes the late 19th century store, stables, a cottage and an early 20th-century residence
Bribie Island Seaside Museum	Bongaree	South East	27.0860°S 153.1594°E	Local	Local history and island life at 1 South Esplanade, Bongaree.
Bundaberg Railway Museum	Bundaberg	Wide Bay–Burnett	24.8590°S 152.3358°E	Railway	Located in North Bundaberg Railway Station at 28 Station Street, Bundaberg North, includes photos, uniforms, tools, a signal cabin, railway cars and equipment.
Bundaberg Regional Art Gallery	Bundaberg	Wide Bay–Burnett		Art	
Burnett War Museum	Kingaroy	Wide Bay–Burnett	26.5770°S 151.8418°E	Military	Located at Kingaroy Airport
Butter Factory Arts Centre	Cooroy	Sunshine Coast		Art	art and local history
Caboolture Historical Village	Caboolture	South East	27.0600°S 152.9480°E	Open air	Includes over 70 historic buildings
Caboolture Regional Art Gallery	Caboolture	South East		Art	website, features four exhibition spaces
Caboolture Warplane Museum	Caboolture	South East		Aviation	website, wartime aircraft, memorabilia, engine displays
Cairns Museum	Cairns	Far North	16.922°S 145.7753°E	Local history	operated by the Cairns Historical Society
Cairns Regional Gallery	Cairns	Far North		Art	Exhibitions of historical and contemporary art by leading regional, national and international artists, and from its collections of the cultural heritage of Far North Queensland
Calliope River Historical Village	River Ranch	Capricorn Coast	23.9591°S 151.1557°E	Open air	Operated by the Port Curtis Historical Society at 50951 Bruce Highway, featuring relocated historic buildings including houses, a school, church, train station, Masonic Lodge hall and a police cell.
Caloundra Regional Gallery	Caloundra	Sunshine Coast	26.8038°S 153.1308°E	Art	
Cambridge Downs Heritage Display Centre	Richmond	North West Queensland		Local history	
Capella Pioneer Village	Capella	Capricorn Coast	23.0791°S 148.0194°E	Open air	
Cardwell Bush Telegraph	Cardwell	Far North		History	Historic post office & telegraph station, old shire hall, courthouse & lock-up
Central Queensland Military Museum	Rockhampton	Capricorn Coast		Military	
Bulmba-ja Arts Centre	Cairns	Far North		Art	Previously known as the Centre of Contemporary Arts Cairns
Childers Pharmaceutical Museum	Childers	Wide Bay–Burnett	25.237°S 152.2781°E	Pharmacy	Turn-of-the 20th century pharmacy
Chinchilla Historical Museum	Chinchilla	Darling Downs		Local history	
Clermont Museum	Clermont	Capricorn Coast	22.7983°S 147.6380°E	Local history	
Clifton Historical Museum	Clifton	Darling Downs		Local history	
Cloncurry Unearthed Museum	Cloncurry	North West Queensland		Local history	
Cobb & Co Museum	Toowoomba	Darling Downs	27.5554°S 151.9646°E	Transportation	Operated by the Queensland Museum, horse-drawn vehicles
Cooktown History Centre	Cooktown	Far North		Local history	Operated by the Cooktown and District Historical Society
Cosmos Centre	Charleville	South West		Science	observatory, meteorites
Country Hospital Museum	Parkhurst	Capricorn Coast		Medical History	
Crows Nest Folk Museum & Village	Crows Nest	Darling Downs	27.2577°S 152.0503°E	Open air	
Crows Nest Regional Art Gallery	Crows Nest	Darling Downs		Art	Located on the corner of the New England Highway and Thallon Street
Croydon Heritage Precinct	Croydon	North West Queensland	18.2034°S 142.2438°E	Local history and heritage	Police Sergeant’s Residence c. 1898, Police Station and Gaol c. 1896, Court House c.1887 and Croydon Town Hall c.1890.
Customs House Museum	Goondiwindi	Darling Downs	28.5489°S 150.3068°E	Duties & taxes period home	Located at 1 McLean Street
Daintree Discovery Centre	Daintree	Far North	16.2376°S 145.4278°E	Natural history	ecology of the Daintree Rainforest
Dairy and Heritage Museum	Murgon	Wide Bay–Burnett	26.2307°S 151.9291°E	Farming	dairying equipment, pioneer homestead
Dalby Pioneer Park Museum	Dalby	Darling Downs		Open air	features many historic buildings, social history collections, operating tractors and agricultural machinery, geology collection
Das Neumann Haus Museum	Laidley	South East	27.6317°S 152.3941°E	Historic house	1930s period home
Diamantina Health Care Museum	Woolloongabba	Brisbane	27.5005°S 153.0332°E	Health care	History of the Princess Alexandra Hospital and predecessor institutions
Dogwood Crossing Miles	Miles	Darling Downs		Art	cultural centre that includes art gallery, library, IT centre and social history displays
Dr Arratta Memorial Museum	Muttaburra	Central West		Local history	features medical artefacts from the former hospital
Drover's Camp	Camooweal	Gulf Country	19.9216°S 138.1332°E	Agriculture, transportation	droving and drovers
Emu Park Museum	Emu Park	Capricorn Coast	23.2573°S 150.8258°E	Local history	includes railway collection
Eromanga Natural History Museum	Eromanga	South West	26.6987° S, 143.2760° E	Natural history	Home of Australia's Largest Dinosaur, Australotitan cooperensis, one of the worlds largest dinosaurs. Holds the largest collection of Australian dinosaur and megafauna held in context, centrally located in Australia so that it is the closest dinosaur/natural history museum to all the Australian capital cities
Eumundi Museum	Eumundi	Sunshine Coast		Local history & History	Local history & temporary exhibitions about all sorts of subjects
Fairymead House Sugar Museum	Bundaberg	Wide Bay–Burnett	24.8557°S 152.3361°E	Agriculture	area sugar industry
Flinders Discovery Centre	Hughenden	North West Queensland		Natural history	dinosaur fossils
Gab Titui Cultural Centre	Thursday Island	Far North	10.5847°S 142.2183°E	Ethnic	Aboriginal culture, history and art
Gatakers Artspace	Maryborough	Wide Bay–Burnett		Art	
Gatton Historical Village	Gatton	South East	27.5724°S 152.2664°E	Open air	Gatton Historical Village is on Freemans Road It is operated by the Gatton & District Historical Society.
Gayndah Museum	Gayndah	Wide Bay–Burnett	25.6258°S 151.6123°E	Historic house, local history	Located at 8 Simon Street
Gladstone Maritime History Museum	Gladstone	Capricorn Coast		Maritime	
Gladstone Regional Art Gallery and Museum	Gladstone	Capricorn Coast	23.8451°S 151.2575°E	Multiple	Art, local culture and history
Glengallan Homestead and Heritage Centre	Warwick	Darling Downs	28.1024°S 152.0579°E	Historic house	19-century country house
Gold Coast City Art Gallery	Surfers Paradise	South East	28°00′04.6″S 153°24′58.93″E	Art	
Greycliffe Homestead	Biloela	Central	24.3963°S 150.5198°E	Historic house	operated by the Banana Shire Historical Society, late 19th century pioneer homestead
Gympie Gold Mining and Historical Museum	Gympie	Wide Bay–Burnett	26.2134°S 152.6848°E	Multiple	Located at 215 Brisbane Road, operated by the Gympie Historical Society, gold mining and local history, industry, agriculture, social history
Gympie Regional Art Gallery	Gympie	Wide Bay–Burnett		Art	
Herberton Mining Museum	Herberton	Far North	17.3839°S 145.3874°E	Mining	tin mining
Herberton Spy & Camera Museum	Herberton	Far North	17.3835°S 145.3853°E	Multiple	history of espionage and photography
Heritage Centre Toowoomba	Toowoomba	Darling Downs		Transportation	road history in Queensland
Hervey Bay Historical Village and Museum	Hervey Bay	Wide Bay – Burnet	25.2833°S 152.8485°E	Historical Village	local history in a village like setting with working displays
Hervey Bay Regional Gallery	Pialba	Wide Bay–Burnett		Art	
Highfields Pioneer Village	Highfields	Darling Downs	27.4414°S 151.9572°E	Open air	Features over 60 restored authentic buildings
Historic Village Herberton	Herberton	Far North		Open air	Features over 50 restored period buildings dating back to the 1860s, set out like a tin mining town
Hinkler Hall of Aviation	Bundaberg	Wide Bay–Burnett	24.8518°S 152.3363°E	Aerospace	life of aviation pioneer Bert Hinkler
Historic House Museum	Charleville	South West		Historic house	operated by the Charleville and District Historical Society
Hou Wang Temple	Atherton	Far North		Ethnic	Early 20th-century Chinese temple with an art gallery and interpretation centre, operated by the National Trust of Queensland
Ilfracombe Machinery and Heritage Museum	Ilfracombe	Central West	23.4881°S 144.5034°E	Agriculture	open air display of agriculture machinery
Ipswich Art Gallery	Ipswich	South East		Art	
Jackson Collections	Ilfracombe	Central West		Commodity	lifetime collections of Hilton and Ike Jackson including bottles, hubcaps, buttons, drill bits, rabbit traps and scissors
Cooktown Museum (formerly known as James Cook Historical Museum)	Cooktown	Far North	15.4689°S 145.2506°E	Local history	Located on the corner of Furneaux and Helen Street. Operated by the National Trust of Queensland, includes artefacts Captain James Cook left behind, history of area education and the former convent.
John Flynn Place	Cloncurry	North West Queensland	20.7042°S 140.5087°E	Multiple	life of John Flynn (minister) and the development of the Royal Flying Doctor Service of Australia, School of the Air, art gallery
Jondaryan Woolshed	Oakey	Darling Downs		Open air	Rural life of pioneering Australia and sheep raising
Kilcoy Hall of History	Kilcoy	South-East	26.9475°S 152.5637°E	Local history	Operated by the Kilcoy District Historical Society in a former union church building from Hazeldean
Kilkivan Shire Museum	Kilkivan	Wide Bay–Burnett		Local history	
Kingaroy Art Gallery	Kingaroy	Wide Bay–Burnett	26.5393°S 151.8413°E	Art	Hosts monthly exhibitions by local and visiting artists in three gallery spaces
Kingaroy Heritage Museum	Kingaroy	Wide Bay–Burnett		Local history	
Kokoda Hall Museum	Cairns	Far North Queensland		Local history	
Kronosaurus Korner	Richmond	North West Queensland	20.7317°S 143.1437°E	Natural history	marine fossils
Kumbia Federation Heritage Centre	Kumbia	Wide Bay–Burnett	26.6913°S 151.6522°E	Local history	operated by the Kumbia and District Historical Society
Laidley Pioneer Village	Laidley	South East	27.6500°S 152.3914°E	Open air	Operated by the Laidley Historical Society at 92 Drayton Street.
Landsborough Shire Museum	Landsborough	Sunshine Coast		Local history	Local and social history
Langenbaker House	Ilfracombe	Central West		Historic house	
Lark Quarry Dinosaur Trackways	Winton	Central West		Natural history	Guided tours of the protected dinosaur trackways and cretaceous fossils
Leahy House	Thargomindah	South West	27.9971°S 143.8219°E	Local history	historical house museum
Logan Art Gallery	Logan Central	South East		Art	
Logan City Historical Museum	Kingston	South East		Local history	
Longreach Powerhouse Museum	Longreach	Central West	23.4404°S 144.2455°E	Technology	Rural generating station with engines, local history displays at 12 Swan Street
Loudoun House Museum	Irvinebank	Far North		Local history	
Maclagan Memories Museum	Maclagan	Darling Downs	27.0834°S 151.6333°E	Open-air	Located at 25 Bunya Mountains Maclagan Road.
Magnetic Island Museum	Picnic Bay, Magnetic Island	Townsville	19.177°S 146.8395°E	Local history	
Mareeba Heritage Museum and Visitor Information Centre	Mareeba	Mareeba	17.0112°S 145.4255°E	Historical	Located at 345 Byrnes Street
Maritime Museum of Townsville	Townsville	Townsville	19.2594°S 146.8232°E	Maritime	Located at 42–68 Palmer Street
Marlborough Historical Museum	Marlborough	Capricorn Coast	22.8128°S 149.8915°E	Local history	Located at 15 Milman Street, it presents the natural and social heritage of Marlborough.
Maroochydore RSL Museum	Maroochydore	Sunshine Coast	26.6555°S 153.0941°E	Military Museum	
Mary Kathleen Memorial Park/ Museum & Information Centre	Cloncurry	North West Queensland		Local history	outdoor displays of steam engines, a traction engine, farm and mining machinery
Mayes Cottage	Kingston	South East	27.6524°S 153.1165°E	Historic house	Late 19th century colonial house
Meandarra ANZAC Memorial Museum	Meandarra	Darling Downs	27.3229°S 149.8827°E	Military	Located in Sara Street, it contains a large collection of ANZAC memorabilia including a Canberra bomber and a German U-boat engine.
Miles Historical Village and Museum	Miles	Darling Downs	26.659°S 150.197°E	Open air	1920s period village
Milne Bay Military Museum	Toowoomba	Darling Downs	27.5678°S 151.9292°E	Military	artefacts and history of the 25th Battalion (Darling Downs Regiment)
Min Min Encounter	Boulia	Central West	22.9116°S 139.9112°E	Natural phenomenon	Stories of the Min Min light
Miner's Cottage	Charters Towers	Townsville		Historic house	late 1800s worker's cottage
Miner's Heritage	Mount Morgan	Capricorn Coast		Mining	
Montys Garage Vintage Car Museum	Glenmorgan	Darling Downs	27.2495°S 149.6779°E	Automotive	1940s style auto garage with restored vintage cars and trucks
Morven Museum	Morven	South West	26.4153°S 147.1116°E	Local history	
Mount Morgan Historical Museum	Mount Morgan	Capricorn Coast	23.6449°S 150.3892°E	Local	local history
Mount Morgan Railway Museum	Mount Morgan	Capricorn Coast	23.6393°S 150.3867°E	Railway	
Mulgrave Settlers Museum	Gordonvale			Local history	
Museum of Australian Military Intelligence	Canungra	South East	28.0328°S 153.1821°E	Military	at Kokoda Barracks
Museum of Australian Army Flying	Oakey	Darling Downs		Aerospace	Historical aircraft tracing the history of the Australian Army Aviation and back to the Australian Flying Corps during World War I
Museum of Tropical Queensland	Townsville	Townsville	19.2574°S 146.8221°E	Multiple	Operated by the Queensland Museum, natural history, marine archaeology and history
Museum of Underwater Art	John Brewer Reef, Townsville	Townsville		Underwater	a series of underwater art installations
Nebo Museum	Nebo	Capricorn Coast	21.6893°S 148.6891°E	Local history	Originally established as Nebo Shire Museum to celebrate the centenary of the shire in 1983. It is housed in the old Nebo Police Station.
Nobby Forge & Vintage Museum	Nobby	Darling Downs		History	clothes, accessories and furniture from the 1900s to the 1960s
Noosa Shire Museum	Pomona	Sunshine Coast	26.3633°S 152.8562°E	Local History	The Noosa Museum is in the old Noosa Shire Hall built in 1911. The Cooroora Historical Society took over the building as a museum in 1985, when the Noosa Shire Council decided their headquarters should be in Tewantin.
Noosa Regional Gallery	Tewantin	Sunshine Coast		Art	
North Stradbroke Island Historical Museum	Dunwich	South East	27.4977°S 153.4040°E	Local history	
Old Rainworth Fort	Springsure	Central	24.1962°S 148.0722°E	History	Mid 19th-century community storehouse built in case of conflict in the Australian frontier wars, contains historic artifacts
Ormiston House	Ormiston	South East	27.4966°S 153.2579°E	Historic house	Mid 19th-century plantation house and gardens
Perc Tucker Regional Gallery	Townsville	Townsville	19.2581°S 146.8181°E	Art	
Pine Rivers Heritage Museum	Petrie	South East	27.2597°S 152.9532°E	Local history	
Pinnacles Gallery	Thuringowa Central	Townsville		Art	Located in the Riverway Arts Centre
Pittsworth Pioneer Historical Village	Pittsworth	Darling Downs	27.7093°S 151.6324°E	Open air	
Pormpuraaw Art & Cultural Centre	Pormpuraaw	Far North		Art	
Port Douglas Court House Museum	Port Douglas	Far North		Local history	Operated by the Douglas Shire Historical Society
Pringle Cottage Museum	Warwick	Darling Downs	28.2203°S 152.0268°E	Open air	Includes two cottages with period furniture, a church and printing museum
Proserpine Historical Museum	Proserpine	Whitsundays	20.4054°S 148.5926°E	Local history	Located at 192–198 Main Street. The museum collects, preserves and presents the history of the Whitsunday region.
Qantas Founders Museum	Longreach	Central West		Aerospace	
Quarantine Museum	Pallarenda	Townsville	19.1917°S 146.7703°E	Medical	
Queensland Air Museum	Caloundra West	Sunshine Coast	26.7979°S 153.1093°E	Aviation	Located at Caloundra Airport with over 94 aircraft on display.
Queensland Ambulance Museum, Barcaldine	Barcaldine	Central West	23.5535°S 145.2872°E	Medical	historic ambulances and equipment, operates within the Australian Workers Heritage Centre
Queensland Ambulance Museum, Charters Towers	Charters Towers	Townsville	20.0768°S 146.2662°E	Medical	historic ambulances and equipment, open by appointment
Queensland Heritage Park	Biloela	Central		Open air	agriculture, rural life
Queensland Motorsport Museum	Sumner	Brisbane		Automotive	Boutique Motorsport Museum, Cars & Bikes, memorabilia and over 800 die-cast models
Queensland Transport Museum	Gatton	South East	27.5696°S 152.2696°E	Transport	Located within the Lockyer Valley Cultural Centre at 34 Apex Park Drive. It has vintage vehicles and models on display.
Quilpie Museum	Quilpie	South West		Local history	local history and art gallery
Quinkan and Regional Cultural Centre	Laura	Far North	15.5649°S 144.4482°E	Multiple	Aboriginal and non-Aboriginal heritage, area natural environment
RAAF Amberley Aviation Heritage Centre	Amberley	South East	27.6419°S 152.7071°E	Military	historic military aircraft and Australian military memorabilia
RAAF Townsville Aviation Heritage Centre	Garbutt	North Queensland	19.2630°S 146.7668°E	Military	Military aviation heritage of North Queensland.
Raspberry Creek Homestead	Byfield	Capricorn Coast		Local history	Operated by the Byfield and District Historical Society
Rathdowney Historical Museum	Rathdowney	South East	28.2120°S 152.8634°E	Local history	
Ration Shed Museum	Cherbourg	Wide Bay–Burnett		Ethnic	Aboriginal culture and what life was like them living under the Aboriginal Protection Act during the first half of the 20th century
Ravenswood Court House Museum	Ravenswood	Townsville	20.0989°S 146.8889°E	Local history	
Redcliffe Museum	Redcliffe	South East	27.2307°S 153.1110°E	Local history	
Redland Art Gallery	Cleveland	South East		Art	also a location in Capalaba
Redland Museum	Cleveland	South East		Local history	Redlands' social history from 1842 to the present, includes textiles, dolls and toys
Ringsfield House	Nanango	Wide Bay–Burnett	26.6729°S 151.9939°E	Historic house	operated by the Nanango Historical Society, early 20th century period house and gardens
Ripley's Believe It or Not!	Surfers Paradise	South East		Amusement	
Riversleigh Fossil Centre	Mount Isa	North West Queensland		Natural history	fossils from the Riversleigh fossil site
RM Williams Australian Bush Learning Centre	Eidsvold	Wide Bay–Burnett	25.3718°S 151.1281°E	Local history	bush culture and history, influence of bushman R. M. Williams on that culture
Rockhampton Heritage Village	Parkhurst	Capricorn Coast		Open air	buildings from 1850 to 1950
Rockhampton Museum of Art	Rockhampton	Capricorn Coast		Art	
Rosewood Railway Museum	Rosewood	South East		Railway	operated by the Australian Railway Historical Society
Roy Emerson Museum	Blackbutt	Wide Bay-Burnett	26.8835°S 152.1013°E	Sports	The former Nukku school building was relocated to Blackbutt to house the museum for tennis player Roy Emerson.
Royal Bull's Head Inn	Drayton	Darling Downs		Historic site	Operated by the National Trust of Queensland, mid 19th century inn, dairy and stables
Royal Flying Doctor Service Visitor Centre	Charleville	South West	26.4182°S 146.2572°E	Medical	history of the Royal Flying Doctor Service of Australia.
Samford Museum	Samford	South East	27.3691°S 152.8855°E	Local history	area rural, domestic, educational, railway, timber, transport and village history
Samurai Gallery Australia	Cairns	Far North Queensland		Museum/Gallery	arts, armor and weaponry of the Japanese samurai warriors
Sarina "Field of Dreams" Historical Centre	Sarina	Capricorn Coast	21.4267°S 149.2174°E	Local history	
Shell World Yeppoon	Yeppoon	Capricorn Coast		Natural history	over 20,000 shells including marine, land and fossil molluscs
South Burnett Energy Centre	Nanango	Wide Bay–Burnett	26.6705°S 152.0014°E	Science	
South Burnett Regional Timber Museum	Wondai	Wide Bay–Burnett		Forestry	area timber industry
Springsure Hospital Museum	Springsure	Central	24.1194°S 148.0844°E	Medical history	Old hospital equipment including beds, linen, and medical.
St George Heritage Centre	St George	South West	28.0444°S 148.5699°E	Local history	
Stanthorpe Heritage Museum	Stanthorpe	Darling Downs		Local history	
Stanthorpe Regional Art Gallery	Stanthorpe	Darling Downs		Art	Exhibitions of regional and national art, both contemporary and traditional
Stonehouse Museum	Boulia	Central West	22.9136°S 139.9078°E	Natural history	includes area marine fossils, Aboriginal artefacts, agriculture equipment
Surf World Gold Coast	Surfers Paradise	South East		Sports	surfing champions and memorabilia
Tambo Post & Telegraph Museum	Tambo	Central Western	24.883°S 146.2566°E	Post & telegraph	operated by the Totally Tambo Heritage Group
Tanks Arts Centre	Cairns	Far North		Art	Performing and visual arts centre, located in a former WWII fuel depot
Taroom Museum	Taroom	Western Downs		Local history	
Templin Historical Museum	Templin	South East		Local history	Working artefacts, local history, memorabilia and fashions from the 1880s (Madame Weigel)
Terrestrial	Georgetown	Far North		Natural history	includes large collection of rocks, minerals, former gold mine structures and equipment
Texas Heritage Centre & Tobacco Museum	Texas	Darling Downs	28.8564°S 151.1727°E	Local history, open air	
The Story Bank	Maryborough	Wide Bay–Burnett	25.5389°S 152.7044°E	Literary	Focuses on the works of P. L. Travers, author of Mary Poppins, who was born in that building.
Toowoomba Regional Art Gallery	Toowoomba	Darling Downs		Art	
Townsville Heritage Centre	Townsville	Townsville	19.2707°S 146.8024°E	Historic house	operated by the National Trust of Queensland, lifestyle of families prominent in the history of north Queensland
Townsville Aboriginal and Torres Strait Islander Cultural Centre	Townsville	Townsville	closed	Ethnic	Aboriginal history, culture, art
Townsville Museum	Currajong, Townsville	Townsville	19.2800°S 146.7841°E	Local history	Located at 1/27 Barbeler St
TYTO Regional Art Gallery	Ingham	North Queensland	18.6525°S 146.1523°E	Art	Located at 73–75 Mcilwraith Street
Underground Hospital and Beth Anderson Museum	Mount Isa	Gulf Country	20.7310°S 139.4946°E	Medical	World War II-era hospital under the ground
University of Southern Queensland Artsworx	Toowoomba	Darling Downs	27.6035°S 151.9319°E	Art	part of University of Southern Queensland.
University of the Sunshine Coast Art Gallery	Sippy Downs	Sunshine Coast	26.7180°S 153.0621°E	Art	part of the University of the Sunshine Coast.
Venus Gold Battery	Charters Towers	Townsville	20.0864°S 146.2932°E	Mining	Gold mining
Waltzing Matilda Centre	Winton	Central West	22.3908°S 143.0400°E	Multiple	includes the Outback Regional Gallery, Qantilda Museum
Warwick Art Gallery	Warwick	Darling Downs	28.2151°S 152.0348°E	Art	
The Wax Museum	Surfers Paradise	South East	27.9981°S 153.4271°E	Wax	includes movie stars, scientists, explorers, villains and world leaders
Wellshot Centre	Ilfracombe	Central West	23.4893°S 144.5051°E	Local history	history of one of Australia's largest sheep stations Wellshot Station
Whitula Museum	Windorah	Central West	25.4221°S 142.6563°E	Local history	
Winton's Diamantina Heritage Truck & Machinery Museum	Winton	Central West	22.3778°S 143.0429°E	Transportation	
Wondai Heritage Centre	Wondai	Wide Bay–Burnett	26.3190°S 151.8730°E	Local history	
Wondai Regional Art Gallery	Wondai	Wide Bay–Burnett	26.3178°S 151.8732°E	Art	
Woodworks Museum & Interpretive Centre	Gympie	Wide Bay–Burnett	26.1633°S 152.6413°E	Forestry	timber and forestry industries up to the 1950s
Workshops Rail Museum	Ipswich	South East	27.5982°S 152.7593°E	Railway	Operated by the Queensland Museum, impact of rail travel in Queensland, includes model railway
Wowan and District Museum	Wowan	Central Queensland	23.9099°S 150.1958°E	Local history	The Wowan and District Museum is in the old butter factory and former railway station at 2A Dee River Road (corner of Leichhardt Highway).
Yandina Historic House	Yandina	South-East	26.5579°S 152.9595°E	Local history	Operated by Yandina & District Historical Society
Yarraman Heritage Centre	Yarraman	Wide Bay–Burnett	26.8413°S 151.9855°E	Local history	
Yugambeh Museum	Beenleigh	South East	27.7247°S 153.2164°E	Ethnic	Aboriginal heritage and culture
Zara Clark Museum	Charters Towers	Townsville	20.0738°S 146.2575°E	Local history	includes transport and local artefacts, mining, medical items and photographs

== Defunct museums ==
- Australian Motorcycle Museum, Haigslea, closed in 2014
- North Queensland Military Museum
- Queensland Energy Museum (the majority of the museum's displays were moved to the Highfields Pioneer Village)

== See also ==
- List of museums in Australia
- List of museums in Brisbane
