= Landsborough Shire Council Chambers =

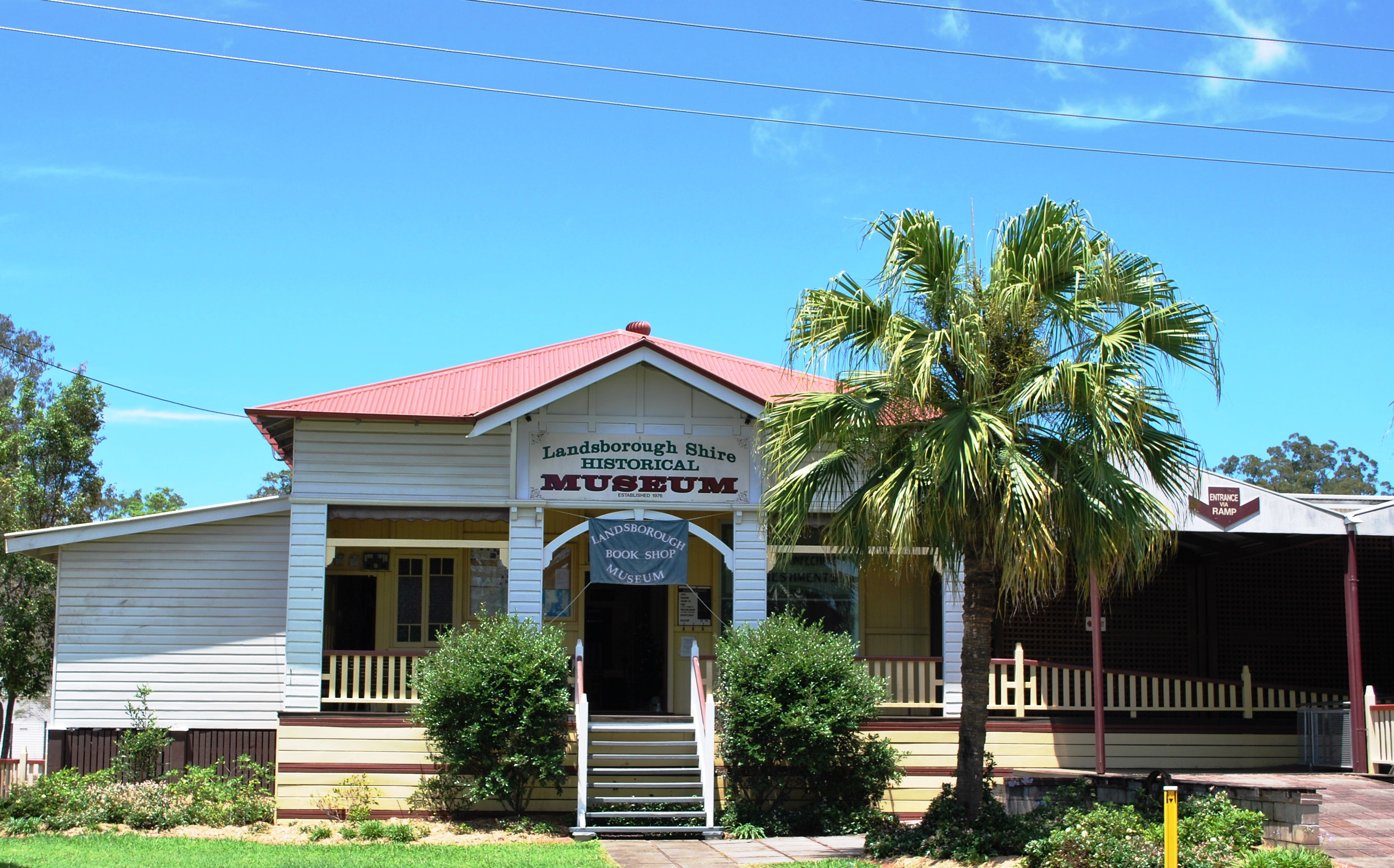
- Landsborough Shire Museum, formerly Landsborough Shire Council Chambers, 2008

- Location within Queensland Location within Australia
- 26.8097°S 152.9647°E
- Location: 4-6 Maleny Street, Landsborough, Sunshine Coast Region, Queensland, Australia

History
- Design period: 1919 - 1930s (interwar period)
- Built: 1924

Site notes
- Architect: Walter Carey Voller
- Architectural style: Classicism

Queensland Heritage Register
- Official name: Landsborough Shire Council Chambers (former), Landsborough Shire Historical Museum
- Type: state heritage (built)
- Designated: 24 June 1999
- Reference no.: 601915
- Significant period: 1920s-1970s (historical); 1924-ongoing (social); 1920s (fabric)
- Significant components: views to, council chamber/meeting room, office/s
- Builders: Alfred Ernest Round

Landsborough Shire Council Chambers is a heritage-listed former town hall and now the Landsborough Shire Museum at 4–6 Maleny Street, Landsborough, Sunshine Coast Region, Queensland, Australia. It was designed by Walter Carey Voller and built in 1924 by Alfred Ernest Round for the Landsborough Shire Council. It is also known as Landsborough Shire Historical Museum. It was added to the Queensland Heritage Register on 24 June 1999.

== History ==
The first European settlement was established in the Landsborough, originally known as Mellum Creek, by Isaac Burgess in 1871. His slab hut on the north of Gympie Road near Mellum Creek became a Cobb & Co. staging post on the run to the Gympie gold fields. Settlement of the area expanded particularly with the arrival of the North Coast railway line from Caboolture in 1890. Named Landsborough after the explorer William Landsborough, the Landsborough railway station became the focus for a town centre and the town of Mellum Creek was renamed Landsborough.

Local government for the region was administered by the Caboolture Divisional Board from 1880. The Caboolture Shire, proclaimed in 1903, assumed responsibility for the administration of the regions of Pine Rivers, Landsborough, Kilcoy, Maroochy, Caboolture and Redcliffe. In February 1912, 423 acres (171 ha) were annexed from Caboolture Shire and proclaimed Landsborough Shire. The first Council meeting for the newly formed Shire was held on 20 April 1912. A Council residence and one room office was constructed in 1913 and was used for meetings of the council until the first purpose-built Chambers was opened in 1924.

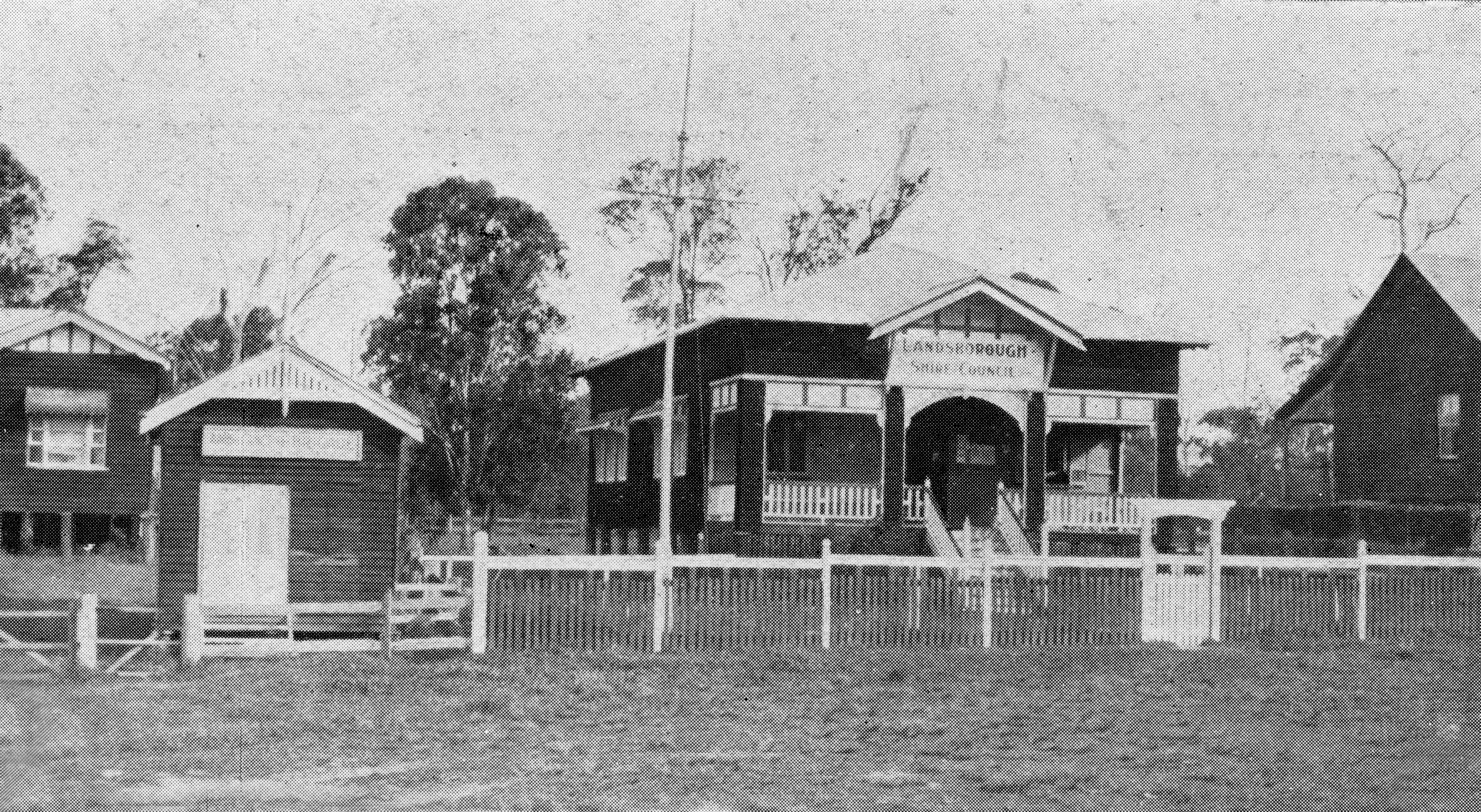
Landsborough Shire Council Chambers, 1932

The former Landsborough Shire Council Chambers, designed by architect Walter Carey Voller and constructed by Alfred Ernest Round, accommodated a council chamber, 2 offices, a counter with office space and a walk-in strong room.

WC Voller served his articles under FDG Stanley from 1882 to 1886 and from 1893 operated a productive architectural practice in Brisbane. His most notable work includes St Paul's Presbyterian Church Mackay (1898), St Paul's Church of England Roma (1913), New Farm Methodist Church (1926) and Silkstone Baptist Church (1928). He owned a beach house at Caloundra and he and his family were frequent visitors and well known in the area.

In 1967 Landsborough, Maroochy and Noosa Shires became known as the Sunshine Coast.

On 19 December 1987, the Shire of Landsborough was granted city status, and was renamed the City of Caloundra, reflecting the population boom in the coastal section of the city. The Council Chambers were relocated from 77 Bulcock Street, Caloundra to 1 Omrah Avenue, Caloundra in 1995.

The original Landsborough Shire Council Chambers closed in 1974. In 1975 the Landsborough Historical Society secured a lease over the building and in 1975 the building was opened as the Landsborough Shire Historical Museum.

During the 1950s, the verandah was extended and enclosed to the east and an extension constructed to the west of the building to accommodate 5 offices. In 1977, the original timber fence was removed and a bullock wagon and two large palms located in the front garden. In 1988, alterations to the former Landsborough Shire Chambers were undertaken during the construction of the large museum extension to the east. The front verandah was reinstated, office partitioning removed, the building painted and a new roof installed. A covered courtyard link between the early building and the new museum extension and a roofed storage area to the north butt directly onto the building.

== Description ==
Constructed in 1924 the former Landsborough Shire Council Chambers, a modest, timber building, has a discreet civic presence on Maleny Street, Landsborough. The building is a low-set, hip-roofed, rectangular, timber structure with open front verandah. A narrow skillion-roofed extension has been erected to the west and a large museum courtyard and building has been constructed to the east.

The building and west extension are clad with chamferboards. The picket paling skirt to the front verandah understorey have been replaced with chamferboards. The core of the former Landsborough Shire Council Chambers is symmetrical about a projecting pedimented gabled entry porch reached by a set of open timber stairs. The verandah to the east has been reconstructed but much original fabric remains to the balance of the verandah. A plain curved timber arch with prominent keystone and corbelled ends marks the entry. Four timber clad panels divide the verandah into bays and a plain timber moulded cornice runs around the verandah. The cornice is supported by small timber console brackets to the two mid panels. The front verandah is lined with vertical tongue-and-groove boarding and post and rail framing is exposed to the verandah. The verandah has plain, vertical, timber slat balustrading and blank frieze panels with bottom rails supported by decorative end corbels. The main entry French doors have a clear glass 2-pane fanlight above the doorway and each door has five panels of coloured, textured glass with the top panel arched.

The interior has been altered but the chamber space remains along with much original fabric including the vertical tongue-and-groove lining, post and rail framing, sheeted and battened ceiling, picture rails to the chamber, doors, casement windows and cupboard between the former office and the chamber.

== Heritage listing ==
The former Landsborough Shire Council Chambers was listed on the Queensland Heritage Register on 24 June 1999 having satisfied the following criteria.

The place is important in demonstrating the evolution or pattern of Queensland's history.

Opened in 1924, the former Landsborough Shire Council Chambers, a modest, low-set, single-storey timber building on Maleny Street, Landsborough, was the first purpose-built council chambers for the Landsborough Shire Council. Although the building has been altered and has received a major extension, the original form is evident.

The place is important in demonstrating the principal characteristics of a particular class of cultural places.

The place is important for its association with the work of architect Walter Carey Voller.

The place is important because of its aesthetic significance.

Residential in scale, the building contributes a dignified civic presence to the streetscape.

The place has a strong or special association with a particular community or cultural group for social, cultural or spiritual reasons.

Sustaining a local government presence from 1924 to 1974, the former Landsborough Shire Council Chambers is important for its association with the Landsborough Shire Council and the local community and illustrates the development of local government in the region.
