= Beaconsfield Station Sheep Wash =

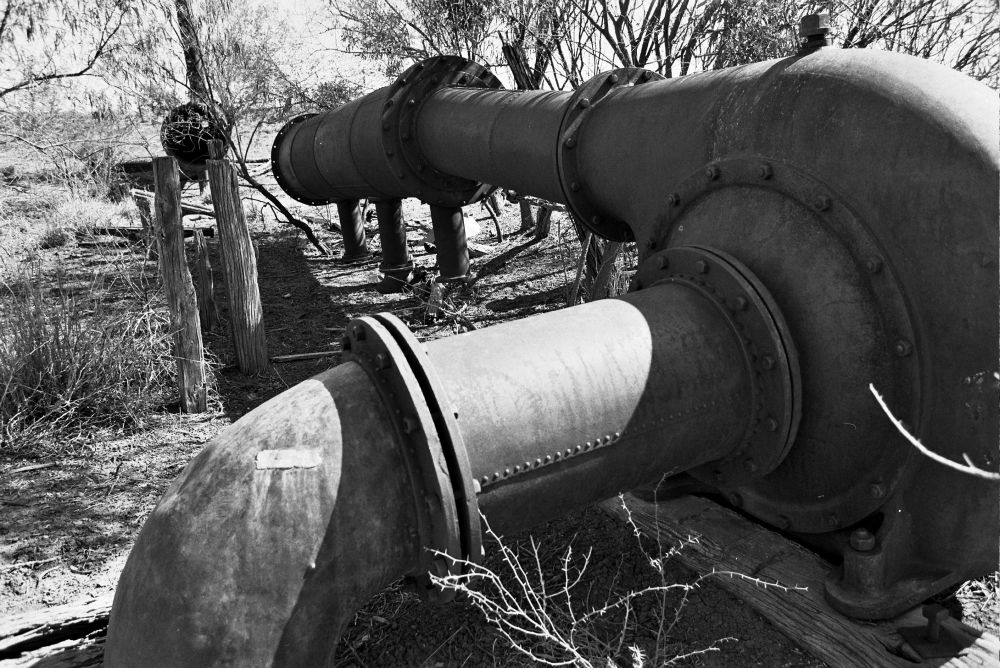
- Beaconsfield Station Sheep Wash

- Location within Queensland Location within Australia
- 23.3252°S 144.5493°E
- Location: Beaconsfield Station, Ilfracombe, Longreach Region, Queensland, Australia

History
- Design period: 1870s–1890s (late 19th century)
- Built: 1890s

Queensland Heritage Register
- Official name: Beaconsfield Station Sheep Wash (former), Beaconsfield Station Sheep Wash (Ruins)
- Type: state heritage (built, archaeological, landscape)
- Designated: 21 October 1992
- Reference no.: 600547
- Significant period: 1890s (historical)
- Significant components: ruin/s, machinery/plant/equipment – pastoralism

Beaconsfield Station Sheep Wash is a heritage-listed sheep washing facility at Beaconsfield Station, Ilfracombe, Longreach Region, Queensland, Australia. It was built in 1890s. It is also known as Beaconsfield Station Sheep Wash (Ruins). It was added to the Queensland Heritage Register on 21 October 1992.

== History ==
The former Beaconsfield Station Sheep Wash comprises a dam, washing trough, machinery and tramlines situated on a creek bank near the site of the 19th century woolshed, north of Ilfracombe.

The runs that later comprised Beaconsfield Station were first taken up in 1872, although they were acquired by southern investors and little development seems to have taken place before the property was bought by George Fairbairn in 1882. Fairbairn built one of the greatest pastoral empires in Australia, his station holdings in Queensland including Landsdowne, Barcaldine Downs, Home Creek, Bimerah, Delta, Logan Downs, Wolfgang, and Beaconsfield, which became one of Australia's premier sheep stations. At their peak, the Fairbairn stations in Queensland carried over 800,000 sheep with Beaconsfield alone commonly running 100,000 head.

Beaconsfield's growth is largely attributed to its manager, Walter Anderson, who oversaw the station for Stephen Fairbairn, the youngest of George's several sons, and was resident at the station between the 1880s and early 1900s. A number of improvements were made during the stewardship of these two men; in 1893 an artesian bore was put down and 24 Wolseley shearing machines were installed at the shearing shed, which was also used by other property owners. The sheep wash is thought to have been built around this time.

Sheep accumulate dirt, grease and vegetable material such as burrs in their fleeces. Washing the sheep before shearing removes this matter, reducing the weight of the wool to be transported. The Beaconsfield wool wash was built near a former dam on Brutus Creek about 1,000 metres (3,300 ft) from a shearing shed. The pumping machinery was installed in a timber-lined trough cut into the bank of the dam. Water was drawn out of the dam by a steam pump located in the trough near the creek. The sheep were washed in the trough by a combination of manual scrubbing and water jets located along the length of the trough. The washed sheep were then moved up a race on the western side of the trough to draining pens where they stood before being taken to the woolshed on trolleys that were winched along twin rail lines. The winch was possibly powered by the steam engine used to power the steam press in the shed.

The process was found unsatisfactory, perhaps because of difficulties in obtaining sufficient water supply, and was abandoned later in the 1890s. The wash may have been abandoned after an artesian bore was sunk at Ilfracombe in c.1897 and a wool scour established soon after. Other steam-driven scouring works, popular in the early 1890s, had by the end of the decade been rendered obsolete by the establishment of a wide-ranging network of large, mechanised wool scours (e.g. the Blackall Woolscour). Over time the track and trolleys were removed to sugar mills and the wool scours at Cramsie (near Longreach) and Ilfracombe.

The scheme is considered highly unusual in Queensland pastoral practice; the large scale of both the scheme and of the pump itself are testament to both the imagination and capital resources of the Fairbairns who may have had experience of comparable schemes in New South Wales and Victoria.

George Fairbairn died in 1895, after which the property passed to Stephen Fairbairn who moved to England in 1904 and remained there until his death in 1938. After his departure, the property reverted to the family company with Walter Anderson as manager until 1907, when Frederick Cobb took over from him. In 1911 the property was sold to John Murray. By this time Beaconsfield's area had been somewhat reduced by resumption.

John Murray was a Scot who had moved to Victoria with his family as a youth. In 1864 he moved to Rockhampton to join his oldest brother and took up a run in the area called Fitzroy Park. He was successfully involved in the sugar industry in the 1870s. Entering politics in 1888 as a member of the Queensland Legislative Assembly, he later became a member of the Queensland Legislative Council and Minister for Railways and Public Works. After his retirement in 1903 he expanded his pastoral holdings, including the acquisition of Beaconsfield.

Following his death in 1917 the property passed to his son Norman who had managed Beaconsfield since its purchase. It continued as one of the larger properties in Queensland's central west until further resumptions were effected in 1929. The property is still held by members of this family.

== Description ==
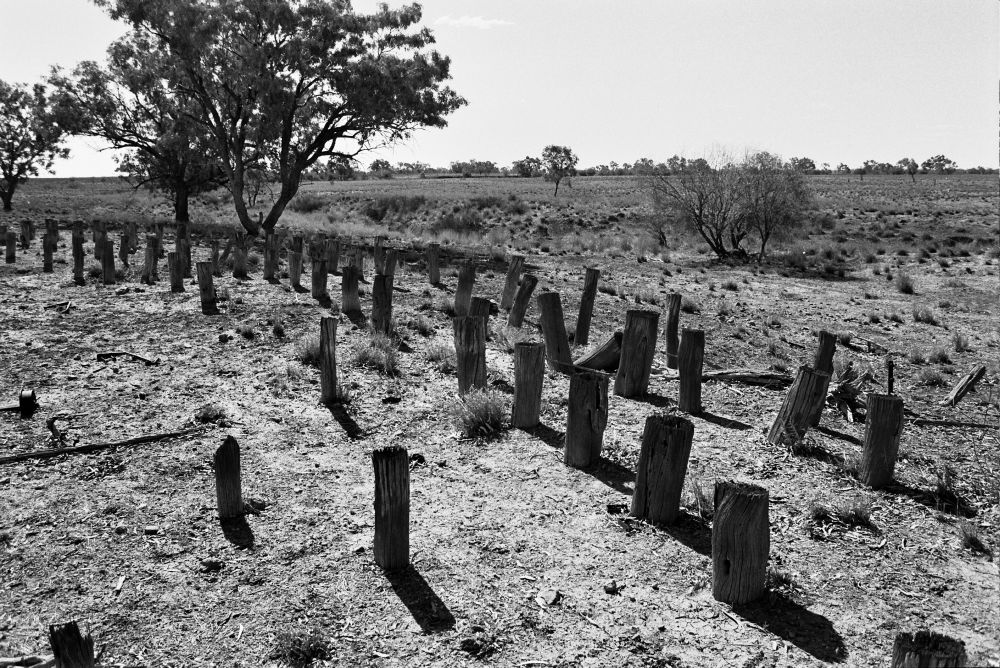
Timber stumps

Beaconsfield is located approximately 19 kilometres (12 mi) north of Ilfracombe. The former sheep wash is located some 5 kilometres (3.1 mi) west of the homestead. The shearing shed, about 1 kilometre (0.62 mi) south-east of the sheep wash, has been replaced by a modern building.

The remains of the sheep wash are on the bank of an intermittently dry creek; the dam that retained the water there was washed away in a flood.

The visible remains of the sheep washing process comprise a circle of timber stumps, which supported the turning loop of the twin rails from the wash to the shearing shed and which encircled the draining yard. Miscellaneous machinery survives including a 61-centimetre (24 in) centrifugal pump made by Robinson Bros & Co. (patent 1882) of Melbourne, jets under which the sheep were washed, and the end of the pump with a column to a head of pressure.

== Heritage listing ==
The former Beaconsfield Station Sheep Wash was listed on the Queensland Heritage Register on 21 October 1992 having satisfied the following criteria.

The place is important in demonstrating the evolution or pattern of Queensland's history.

The former Beaconsfield Station Sheep Wash, thought to have been constructed in about 1893, is important in demonstrating the evolution of mass wool production techniques during the development of Queensland's pastoral industry. It is a good example of an attempt at mass, mechanised washing of sheep using available technology in a remote location.

The place demonstrates rare, uncommon or endangered aspects of Queensland's cultural heritage.

The former sheep wash is important as an uncommon example of a large-scale sheep washing system in outback Queensland.

The place has potential to yield information that will contribute to an understanding of Queensland's history.

The former sheep wash at Beaconsfield has the potential to yield information that will contribute to an improved understanding of wool production techniques in outback Queensland during the 19th century. The place is sufficiently intact to permit further study of the washing technique used at that location and to contribute to a broader understanding of the development of Queensland's wool industry.

The place is important in demonstrating the principal characteristics of a particular class of cultural places.

The former Beaconsfield Station Sheep Wash is important in demonstrating the principal characteristics of such a facility, the following key features being extant: a dam, washing trough, pump, water jet, and tramline for transporting the washed sheep to the nearby woolshed.

The place has a special association with the life or work of a particular person, group or organisation of importance in Queensland's history.

The former Beaconsfield Station Sheep Wash has a special association with the Fairbairn pastoral empire, one of the most extensive pastoral holdings in Australia at the time. It has a particular association with Stephen Fairbairn and Walter Anderson the owner and manager of Beaconsfield respectively, who were responsible for its development into one of Australia's foremost sheep stations.
