= Blackall Woolscour =

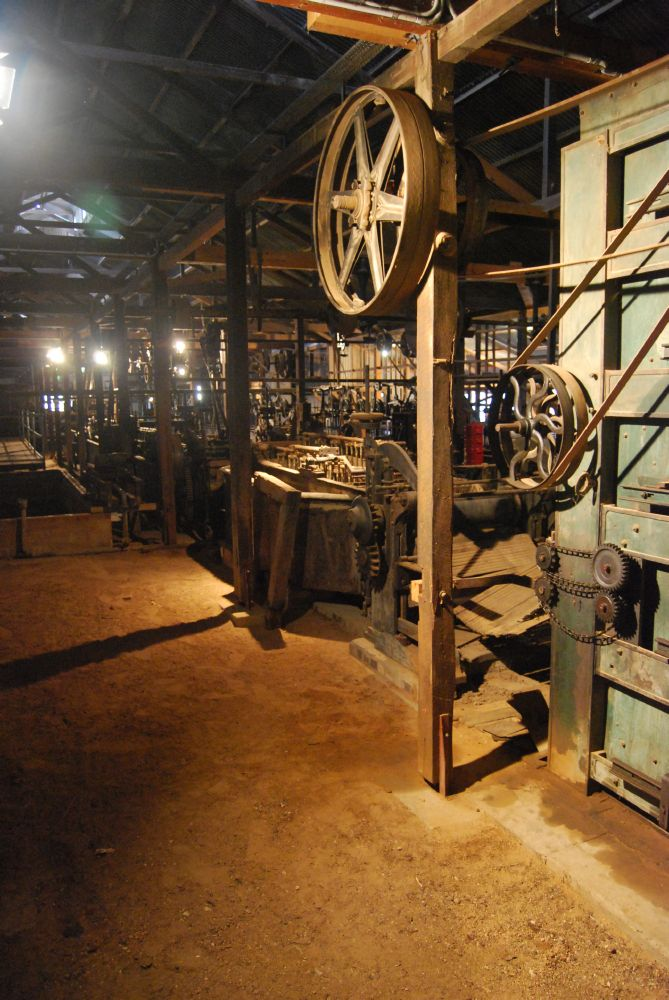
- Blackall Woolscour machinery, 2010

- Location within Queensland Location within Australia
- 24.3949°S 145.4878°E
- Location: Evora Road, 4km northeast of Blackall, Queensland, Australia

History
- Design period: 1900–1914 (early 20th century)
- Built: 1908–1920s circa

Queensland Heritage Register
- Official name: Blackall Woolscour
- Type: state heritage (built)
- Designated: 21 October 1992
- Reference no.: 600033
- Significant period: 1900s–1920s (historical); 1900s–1920s (fabric); 1900s–ongoing (social)
- Significant components: residential accommodation – manager's house/quarters, kitchen/kitchen house, depot – fuel, meat house, yards – livestock, machinery/plant/equipment – manufacturing/processing, shearing shed/woolshed, railway, out building/s, wool scour, bore, machinery/plant/equipment – pastoralism, residential accommodation – shearers' quarters, pond/s – settling, shed/s

Blackall Woolscour is a heritage-listed wool scour at 302 Evora Road, 4 kilometres (2.5 mi) northeast of Blackall, Queensland, Australia. It was built in 1908 to and ceased operations in 1978. It was added to the Queensland Heritage Register on 21 October 1992 it became a museum and was fully restored to the only fully working historical steam powered working woolscour museum in the world .

== History ==
The Blackall Woolscour, a collection of large sheds containing shearing and scouring equipment built for the Blackall Proprietary Woolscouring Company, commenced operations in 1908 at a cost of about £20,000. Situated 4 kilometres (2.5 mi) outside Blackall adjacent to the newly opened branch railway line the scour continued to operate until its closure in 1978.

Wool scouring, one of the methods for cleaning impurities from wool after shearing, began as an alternative to sheep washing in Australia (e.g. Beaconsfield Station Sheep Wash) in the 1840s and had almost replaced it by the 1890s . Initially scouring was done by manual methods such as pot and stick or hand box, but by the early 1890s steam driven mechanised scouring dominated the industry.

In Australia the large mechanical scours were generally located in the major urban centres. Western Queensland was the exception with the construction of mechanical scouring plants in Charleville, Barcaldine, Ilfracombe, Blackall, Longreach, Winton, Julia Creek, Richmond, Maxwelton and Alba near Hughenden between the late 1890s and the early 1920s. Of these Blackall scour is the only one to remain intact and was the last to cease operating.

Scouring, probably using the hand box method, began in Blackall in 1893 when William Henry Banks established a scour near the town bore. Operations were transferred in 1900, after disputes with the town council over water leases, to Duneira, Banks's property.

Construction of the railway line to Blackall began in 1905, based on the understanding that local businessmen would establish a woolscour. The same year the Blackall Proprietary Woolscour Company was founded by five members of the local grazing and business community with John Henry Hart as chairman and in December tenders were advertised for the sinking of a bore "not more than three miles from the township of Blackall"; in February 1906 the tender of the Intercolonial Deep Well-Boring Company was accepted. In September 1906, the Blackall Proprietary Woolsour Company contracted Renshaw and Ricketts, Rockhampton builders, to erect in four months the scouring and shearing shed was using hoop pine from Maryborough.

The plant, offered for sale in 1913, was acquired by Western Queensland Meat Export Company. The Melbourne-based company which already owned a boiling down works and a wool scour in Barcaldine made progressive improvements and modifications to the machinery to increase the efficiency of the scour and therefore its capacity, more than doubling the 1913 output by 1918 to 7640 bales, the largest output in its history. The years of peak production were 1916 to 1920. Business declined in the 1920s with other scours in the region closing temporarily or permanently. The general management of the scour was overseen by Allan Martin Ferguson from 1913 until his death in 1933. Members of the Ferguson family continued to manage the complex until 1957.

The Western Queensland Meat Export Company continued to operate the scour, mostly at a profit, until 1964 when it was sold to K Austin of Glencoe Station. In 1974 CF Thomas Pty Ltd bought the scour and it was closed in 1978 after a storm caused damage to the boiler. Subsidiary activities of the scour included fellmongering, the removal of wool from dead sheep skins; selling petrol for the C.O.R. Company and farming in the 1950s. Shearing was also carried out as a separate activity and wool could be classed and pressed without being scoured. The shearing board is still in use.

In 1988 Blackall Shire Council (now the Blackall-Tambo Regional Council) took out a 99-year lease. The site has since been subdivided to allow the Historic Woolscour Association to purchase most of the buildings and a substantial amount of associated property. The wool storage shed, on an adjoining property, is currently used by a pet food manufacturer. The bore remains the property of R Politch.

From 1998, Brisbane architectural firm Conrad Gargett has undertaken conservation work to stabilise the buildings and provide safe visitor access. The work won an RAIA conservation award in 2003.

== Description ==
Located in a rural setting approximately 4 kilometres (2.5 mi) north-northeast of Blackall on the eastern side of the railway line, the woolscour complex consists of a number of timber framed corrugated iron sheds, varying in size and complexity and serviced by an artesian bore, settling ponds, a railway spur line and sheepyards.

The major structures are the centrally positioned main building where the shearing, scouring and associated processes took place, an adjacent wool storage shed situated on the western side of the main building, extensive sheepyards adjoining the northeast corner of the main building and a dispersed group of accommodation and service buildings located about 100 metres (330 ft) to the southeast of the central group of buildings.

The main building, a large L-shaped conglomeration, consists of a series of attached sheds with timber trussed gable roofs. These sheds form a sequence of spaces through which the wool passed, beginning on the sheep's back in the northeast corner and ending in the southwest part of the building as baled wool. Areas associated with the successive phases of the wool processing, the shearing, classing, scouring and drying and pressing, are defined by changes in floor level and separate roofs.

The largest space, a long rectangular skylit shed, contains machinery and equipment for scouring, fellmongering and drying and a small office in the southwestern corner. To the east of this space, at the northern end, are the classing area and adjoining shearing board. These three attached sheds form the triple gable of the northern facade. The raised timber floor of the shearing board which is reached from the sheepyards by a timber ramp, steps down gradually to an earth floor in the scouring area.

On the southeast side of the main building, the inside corner of the L, are a number of ancillary structures. These include a free standing gable roofed work area and attached to the eastern wall of the scouring shed, a blacksmith's room, an engine room and a roofed area associated with the boilers. Further to the east is a large ash heap and the remnants of a trolley way, once used to cart timber to the boilers.

At the southern end of the scouring area is the only two storeyed part of the complex. Roughly square in plan it consists of an upper level wool room; a central open space bounded on the east and west by individual compartments; and an open plan lower level containing a wool press. A timber loading platform is located just outside between the western wall of the two storeyed section and the railway spur line. The spur line runs through the centre of the complex between the wool storage shed, a rectangular building with a double gable roof supported by rows of columns and the main building.

The scour buildings contain extensive machinery and equipment, including steam engines, boilers, cast iron tanks, dryers, wool presses, and a complex system of belts, pulleys and shafts.

The group of smaller scale buildings to the south east of the main building consists of a kitchen, shearer's quarters, toilet block, shower block and meat preparation shed. Excepting for the meat preparation shed which is a square planned, hipped roof enclosure, these buildings have simple gable roofs. The shearer's quarters has a verandah on the western side. The kitchen has attached skillion roofed spaces on the northern and eastern sides. A water tank and stand is located beside the shower block.

A shallow pitched corrugated iron roof on timber posts situated just south of the main building, shelters the head of the artesian bore and the generating plant. Bore water which falls into an adjacent settling pond is distributed via a series of drains.

A fuel depot, an elevated timber and corrugated iron shed, is sited southwest of the main complex where the spurline rejoins the railway line.

The former manager's residence, a single-storeyed gable roofed timber building with skillion roofed verandahs, is located on a nearby property, to the west of the railway line. The front verandah has wide overhangs and is enclosed with insect screens. A number of structures are attached to the rear verandah, the largest being a gable roofed wing with verandah.

Nearly all of the structures associated with the Blackall Woolscour remain largely as built in their original position. The building fabric shows signs of age and wear including the accumulation of dust and lanolin, the effects of weathering and some decay of structural elements.

== Heritage listing ==
Blackall Woolscour was listed on the Queensland Heritage Register on 21 October 1992 having satisfied the following criteria.

The place is important in demonstrating the evolution or pattern of Queensland's history.

The Blackall Woolscour is important in demonstrating the pattern and evolution of Queensland's history being part of a once flourishing secondary industry which developed in western Queensland in the late 19th and early 20th century in conjunction with the spread of the railway.

The place demonstrates rare, uncommon or endangered aspects of Queensland's cultural heritage.

The place demonstrates rare aspects of Queensland's cultural heritage (i) as the only known surviving example of an early 20th century mechanised woolscour in Australia; (ii) for the unusual intactness in an early 20th century rural industrial complex of machinery and equipment which is still substantially in situ.

The place is important in demonstrating the principal characteristics of a particular class of cultural places.

The Blackall Woolscour demonstrates the principal characteristics of mechanised woolscours in western Queensland including: (i) an abundant supply of bore water (ii) the rural setting adjacent to the railway line (iii) the dispersed character of the complex with large scale central buildings and scattered outbuildings.

The place is important because of its aesthetic significance.

The Blackall Woolscour exhibits aesthetic characteristics valued by the community including: (i) the evocative character of the buildings, machinery and setting due to the intactness of the site, the extensive use of timber and iron construction and the visible effects of age and use on the building fabric (ii) the contrast between the simple utilitarian building forms set in an open landscape and the complex internal arrangements of spaces, levels and intricate machinery (iii) the well detailed construction of the main building and the examples of bush carpentry in the ancillary structures.

The place is important in demonstrating a high degree of creative or technical achievement at a particular period.

As a well designed and efficiently organised example of the first generation of fully mechanical scours, the Blackall Woolscour demonstrates a high degree of technical achievement at the time of its construction.

The place has a strong or special association with a particular community or cultural group for social, cultural or spiritual reasons.

As a place of interaction between the rural and town communities the Blackall woolscour has a special association with the people of Blackall and the surrounding Shire providing a social, cultural and economic focus in the district.

== Engineering heritage ==
Blackall Woolscour received an Engineering Heritage National Marker from Engineers Australia as part of its Engineering Heritage Recognition Program.
