= Landsborough Shire Museum =

Landsborough Shire Historical Museum
- "From the mountains to the Sea"
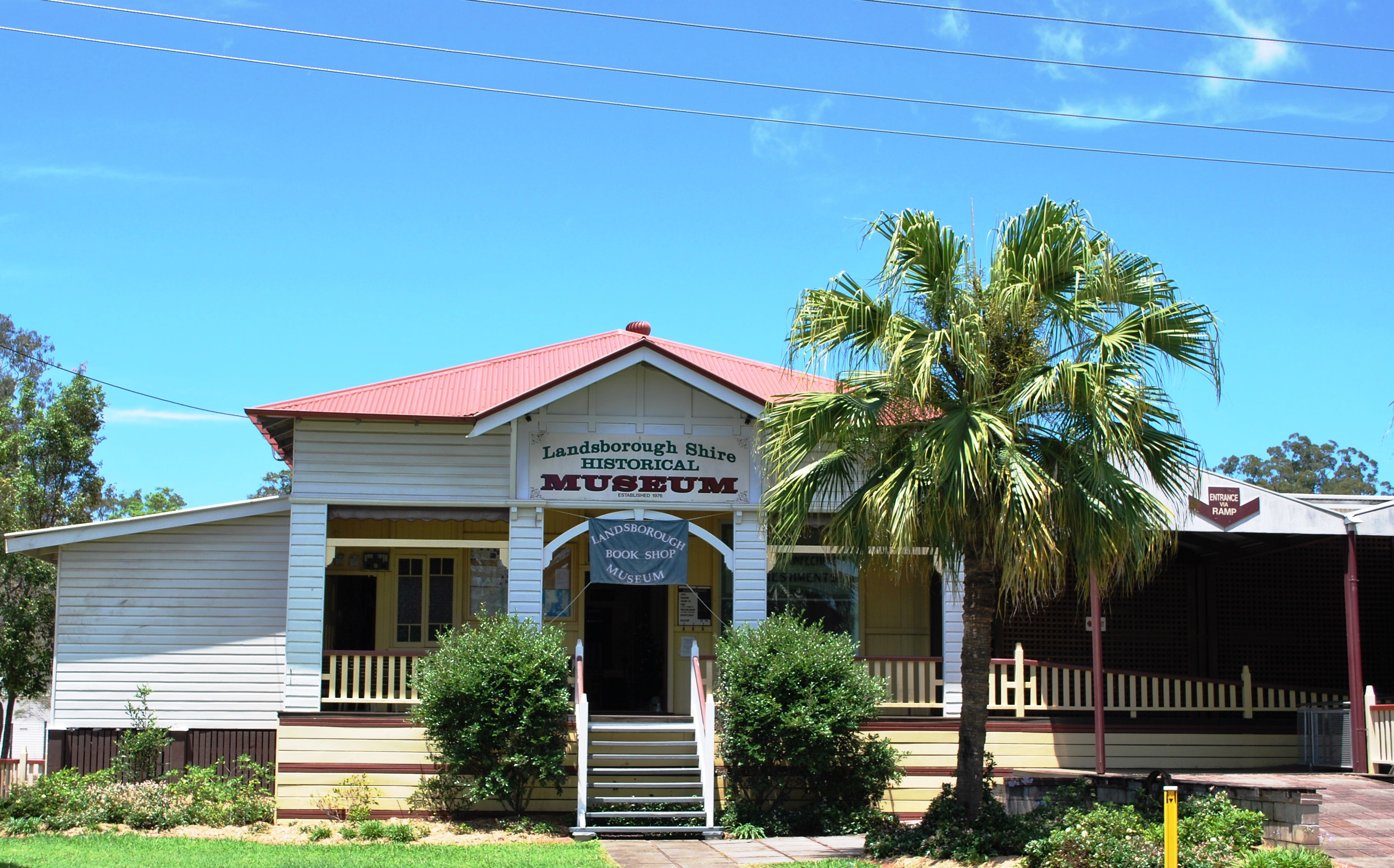
- Landsborough Shire Museum, located in the Heritage listed Landsborough Shire Council Chambers
- Established: 3 April 1976
- Location: Landsborough, Queensland, Australia
- Coordinates: 26.8094°S 152.9648°E
- Type: Local history museum and social museum
- Owners: Operated by Landsborough & District Historical Society
- Website: http://www.landsboroughmuseum.org.au/

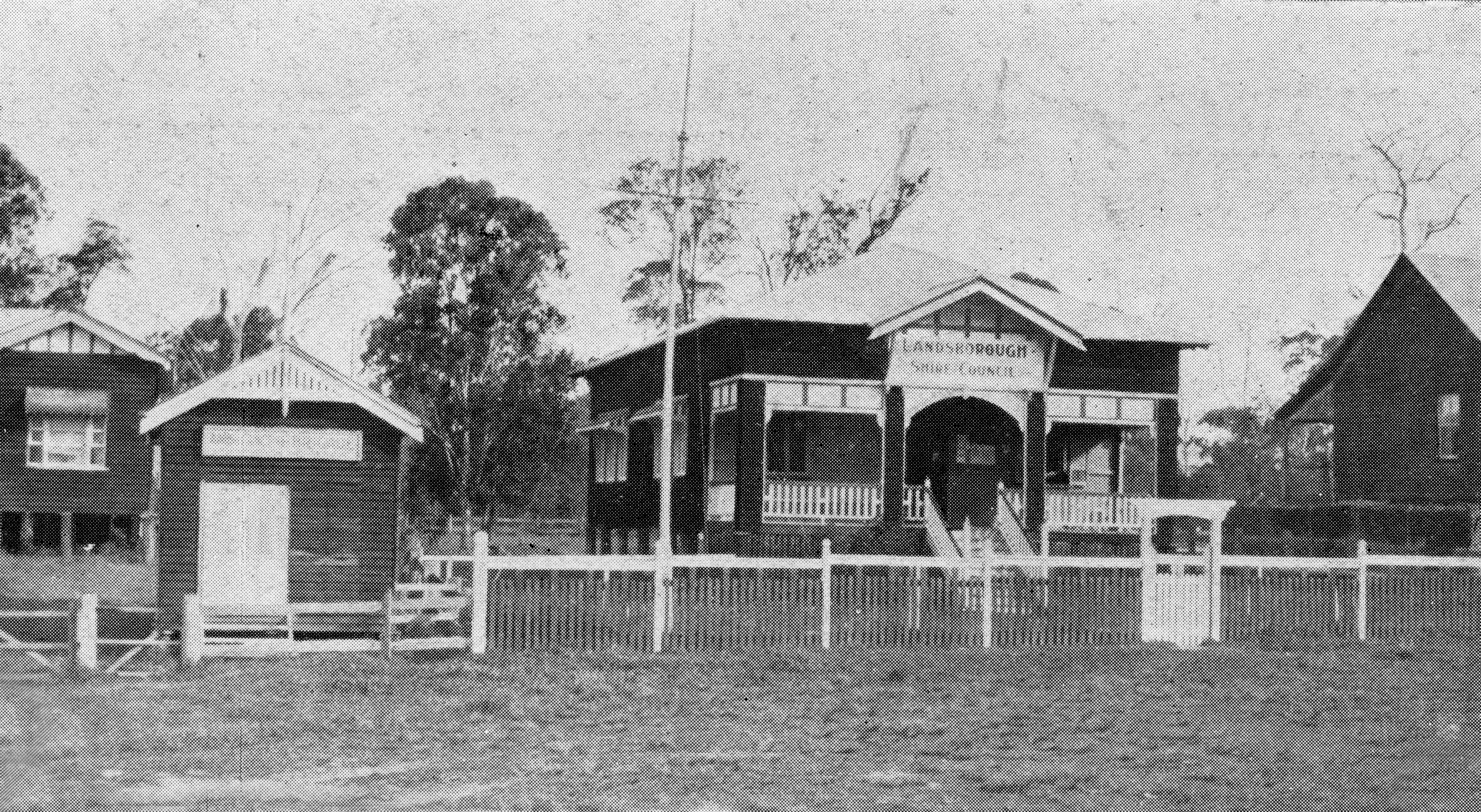
Landsborough Shire Council Chambers, 1932

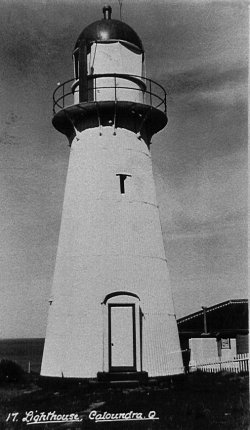
The Old Caloundra Lighthouse

The Landsborough Shire Historical Museum is a local history and social history museum located in the Sunshine Coast town of Landsborough in Queensland, Australia. The museum explicitly houses and records the local history of the former Landsborough shire and includes the centre of Caloundra and is housed in the Heritage listed Landsborough Shire Council Chambers on Maleny Street.

== History ==
The Landsborough Shire Chambers building was opened in 1924. After the last council meeting was held on 24 July 1968, the council moved to a new premise in Caloundra after the council had received city status. In 1975 the Landsborough Historical Society, which had been incorporated in 1973, secured a lease over the building in 1975 and on 3 April 1976 the building was opened as the "Landsborough Shire Historical Museum". The museum is run entirely on a volunteer basis.

== The Collection ==
All of the historical photos and items in the museum were donated by local families and businesses and detail the history of the area. There are several key permanent exhibitions at the museum, listed as follows:

- William Landsborough Collection: containing artifacts that belonged to the first Australian explorer to cross the continent from South to North.
- Sir Frank Nicklin Collection
- Caloundra Lighthouse Display: containing artifacts relating to the historic light house.
- Social History Displays
- Printing Press
- Tobacco Industry
- Timber Industry
- Phones of Yesteryear

There are also several moving displays hosted annually.

== Public research ==
The museum has developed a comprehensive data base containing thousands of historical photos and documents, which is accessible to the public in the Stan Tutt Reading Room

== See also ==
- List of museums in Queensland
- List of transport museums
