= Brick Cottage, Gayndah =

Brick Cottage
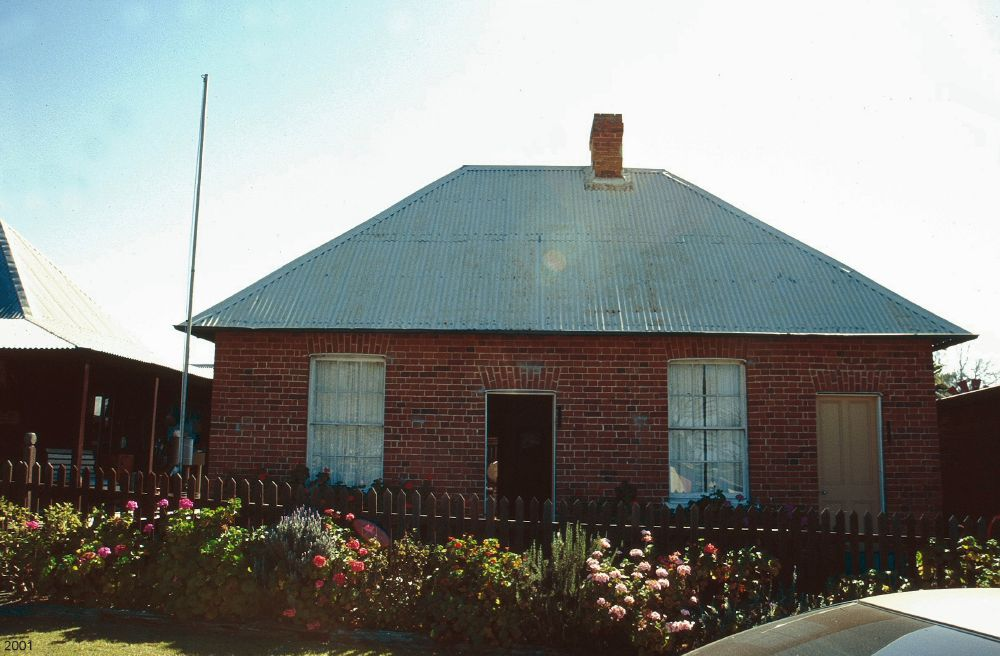
- Brick Cottage, 2001

- Location within Queensland Location within Australia
- 25.6258°S 151.6123°E
- Location: 8 Simon Street, Gayndah, North Burnett Region, Queensland, Australia

History
- Design period: 1840s–1860s (mid-19th century)
- Built: 1864

Site notes
- Architectural style: Georgian

Queensland Heritage Register
- Official name: Brick Cottage, Gayndah Museum
- Type: state heritage (built)
- Designated: 14 December 2001
- Reference no.: 602185
- Significant period: 1860s (fabric, historical); 1900 (fabric)
- Significant components: residential accommodation – main house
- Builders: Henry Fenwick

Brick Cottage is a heritage-listed cottage now used as a museum at 8 Simon Street, Gayndah, North Burnett Region, Queensland, Australia. It was built in 1864 by Henry Fenwick. It is now known as Gayndah Museum. It was added to the Queensland Heritage Register on 14 December 2001.

== History ==
The Brick Cottage in Gayndah was built in 1864 by Mr Henry Fenwick for a Mr Alexander Walker, early resident and licensee of the Gayndah Hotel. The cottage is located in the centre of town and is the oldest surviving brick residence in Gayndah.

Gayndah was first settled as a town in 1849, shortly after squatters selected land in the Central Burnett. The site of what was to become the Gayndah Township was selected and named in 1849 by Maurice Charles O'Connell, Land Commissioner for the Burnett. In 1850 the name of Gayndah was recognised when the Post Office and Courthouse were gazetted, but it wasn't until 1852 that Gayndah was gazetted as a town.

Once the road to the Port of Maryborough was surveyed and cleared in c. 1850 an influx of settlers followed and over the next ten years Gayndah's sheep, cattle, diary and agricultural industries began to flourish. Early freehold land sales were held in Gayndah in 1854. Joseph Hadley was one of the first people to buy land in the town and purchased the land that the brick cottage now resides on in 1854 for £3/12/-. In 1864, Alexander Walker purchased the land from Mr Hadley and employed local builder, Henry Fenwick, to build a brick cottage, where it is believed he resided for the next six years. Alexander Walker was an early resident of Gayndah. He was the licensee of the Gayndah Hotel and owner of the property, Mt Cyrus, located just outside Gayndah. He was also foster father to the Barnard boys, who he had taken into his care when their father died in 1858.

In 1870 William Barnard took over ownership of the brick cottage on Simon Street. William Barnard, a local blacksmith, and his wife Elizabeth McDonald, remained as residents of the cottage until the death of their daughter, Ellen, in 1958. The cottage then passed through a number of hands until the Gayndah Shire Council purchased the cottage in 1969 in order to save it from demolition.

The allotment the Brick Cottage resides on once ran from Capper Street through to Burnett Terrace and had several other buildings on the lot including a Blacksmith. Constructed of locally manufactured brick laid in the Flemish bond, the Georgian style cottage originally consisted of 3 rooms with a central fireplace. In c. 1900, an open verandah with a small room to one side that served as a semi-detached kitchen was added to the back of the cottage. The presence of two front doors also indicates that the cottage may have been built for use as a residence and shop but there is no evidence to support to suggest that any of the owners used it for this purpose.

During the Barnard's occupation the interior of the original cottage remained relatively unchanged. When the Barnard's sold the property in 1958 it passed through a number of hands and underwent some alterations. The back verandah was enclosed sometime during the late 1950s and the original timber flooring was removed, leaving the main bedroom with a rough concrete floor and the living area with a dirt floor. The mantels over the central fireplace were also removed at some point and the wall separating the two bedrooms demolished, effectively changing the cottage from 3 rooms to 2.

A number of conservation works have taken place since the Gayndah Shire Council purchased the Brick Cottage in 1969. In 1988 the original shingled roof was removed and replaced with a corrugated iron hip roof. At this time, work was also carried out on the ceiling, which needed to be repaired again in 1994, as it was beginning to sag due to incorrect installation of the roof timbers. The dirt floor in the main room was laid with concrete to match the exposed floor in the bedrooms, the front doors of the cottage were replaced and the interior walls replastered. The mantels over the central fireplace were also replaced, on one side with what is believed to be a replica of the original and the other with the mantel from the fireplace at Ban Ban homestead.

The Brick Cottage now operates as a museum under the direction of the Gayndah Historical Society. Once the only building on the lot, the cottage is now bordered on both sides by other buildings from the town of Gayndah to form part of an historical village. It houses a collection of memorabilia, which covers many aspects of early life in and around Gayndah.

== Description ==
The Brick Cottage is located on the southern end of Simon Street, Gayndah, between Capper Street and Burnett Terrace. The cottage is a simple, symmetrical single storey building constructed of locally manufactured bricks laid in Flemish bond with a corrugated iron roof. A timber-framed addition is attached at the rear and has corrugated iron skillion roof.

The masonry portion of the house displays a Georgian influence through its simple rectangular form and symmetrical facade which has two large six-pane sash windows and two front doors to Simon Street. A rear door provides access to the enclosed verandah and lean to on the western elevation and there are two sash windows on the southern elevation and one on the northern elevation. The eaves are not lined and the rafters have a curved end profile.

Internally the main cottage has a recent concrete slab floor, rendered walls and ceilings lined with beaded tongue and groove boards. The cottage is divided into two by a load bearing masonry wall that houses two fireplaces - one to each side. The northern portion of the cottage was once two rooms and evidence survives of the location of the dividing wall.

To the rear of the cottage is an enclosed verandah and semi-detached lean-to. The enclosed verandah has been extended and divided into two rooms. Both rooms are clad with weatherboards and some sections lined with fibro sheeting. The semi-detached lean-to is constructed of wooden battens with a corrugated iron roof.

== Heritage listing ==
Brick Cottage was listed on the Queensland Heritage Register on 14 December 2001 having satisfied the following criteria.

The place is important in demonstrating the evolution or pattern of Queensland's history.

The Brick Cottage was erected in the town of Gayndah in 1864. It holds a special association for the community of Gayndah as the only surviving residence from the town's settlement period. The Brick Cottage demonstrates the pattern of development of some of Queensland's more remote towns.

The place demonstrates rare, uncommon or endangered aspects of Queensland's cultural heritage.

Built in the very early stages of the town's development, the cottage is a good example of a mid 19th century workers dwelling and constructed of the now rare use of locally produced hand made bricks.

The place is important in demonstrating the principal characteristics of a particular class of cultural places.

Built in the very early stages of the town's development, the cottage is a good example of a mid 19th century workers dwelling and constructed of the now rare use of locally produced hand made bricks.
