= Tambo Post Office =

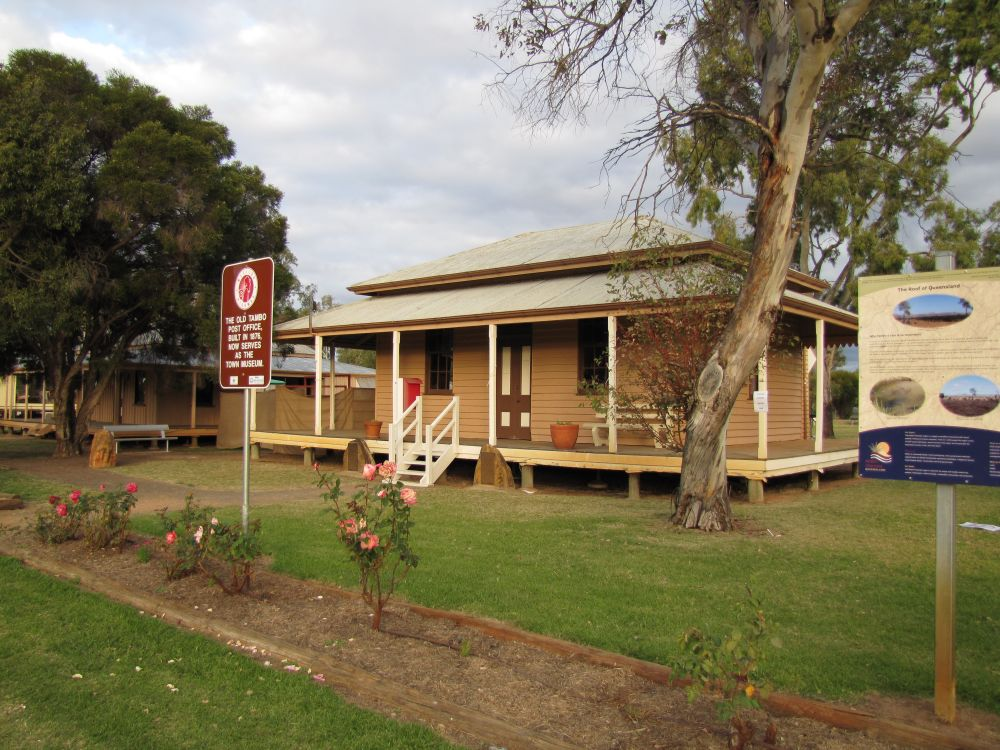
- Former Tambo Post Office built in 1876

- Location within Queensland Location within Australia
- 24.883°S 146.2566°E
- Location: Arthur Street, Tambo, Blackall-Tambo Region, Queensland, Australia

History
- Design period: 1870s–1890s (late 19th century)
- Built: 1876, 1885

Queensland Heritage Register
- Official name: Tambo Post Office (former), Post and Telegraph Office Tambo, Tambo Telecommunications Museum
- Type: state heritage (built)
- Designated: 21 October 1992
- Reference no.: 600833
- Significant period: 1876, 1885–86 (fabric); 1870s – early 1900s (historical, social)
- Significant components: residential accommodation – post master's house/quarters, post & telegraph office, kitchen/kitchen house, post office

Tambo Post Office is a heritage-listed former post office and now museum at Arthur Street, Tambo, Blackall-Tambo Region, Queensland, Australia. It was built in 1876 and 1885. It is also known as Post and Telegraph Office Tambo and Tambo Telecommunications Museum. It was added to the Queensland Heritage Register on 21 October 1992.

== History ==
Thomas Mitchell first explored the area in 1846 and following subsequent exploration in 1858 by Augustus Charles Gregory and by William Landsborough and Nathaniel Buchanan in 1860, the first pastoral run in the area was taken up in 1861 to be soon followed by others. By 1864 most pastoral land in the area had been taken up.

Tambo was the first township on the Barcoo River, a town reserve being gazetted on 27 June 1863 as "Carrangarra". In 1864 a license was granted for the Barcoo Club Hotel and the settlement quickly developed. In 1866 a Clerk of Petty Sessions was appointed to Carrangarra and a mail service was established at the Royal Carrangarra Hotel with the publican as postmaster. In 1868 the town was surveyed and renamed Tambo. The first land sales were held in the following year although 50 people and 34 buildings were already present in the budding township. In 1873 the post office moved to the store, the storekeeper becoming the postmaster.

The Overland Telegraph network was begun in Australia in 1854. The first line in Queensland was that established between Ipswich in Brisbane in 1861. Lines continued to be constructed and by 1870 most major coastal towns and some western centres were linked to the system. An Electric Telegraph Station was opened at Tambo on 16 June 1874, following the construction of a telegraph line between Tambo and Springsure. This line ran northeast to Springsure through Clermont to Nebo, where it joined the main northern line extending from Brisbane to Dalby through Hawkwood and Camboon to Rockhampton and then to Bowen, Townsville and Cardwell to Normanton on the Gulf of Carpentaria. The line made Tambo a key part of the Australian communications network link. In 1875 a further telegraph line was opened to Charleville and in 1877 to Blackall.

In 1876 the first purpose-built post office was constructed at the northeast corner of Star and Arthur Streets, Tambo. It was a timber building with a shingle roof and was constructed to a typical plan for a rural post office of the period, being domestic in form with public offices at the front and accommodation for the postmaster and his family at the rear with a detached kitchen at the back.

In 1879 the Post and Telegraph Offices were amalgamated in Queensland and in 1883 a second telegraph line opened between Tambo and Blackall. Tambo was now a major relay station and the old post and telegraph office was inadequate. In 1885 a new building was constructed adjacent to the existing post and telegraph office and the older building became used wholly for accommodation, a common method of extending inadequate premises at the time. The new building consisted of a single room and in 1886 a battery room was added to the rear. Extension of the lines was continued and by 1887 there were five telegraph operators at Tambo. Although some additions were made in 1895 to increase office and mail box space, when the buildings were assessed at Federation, when control passed into the hands of the new Australian Government, they were considered inadequate. A new post office was planned in 1903 on the site of the existing buildings. Tambo ceased to be a repeating station in 1916 when Charleville became the main station.

When the new post office was completed in 1904 the old buildings were sold for removal. The 1876 building was sold to Mr and Mrs Sullivan who were licensees of the nearby Telegraph Hotel and moved across the road to land next to the hotel. Mrs Sullivan had been the widow of Denis Mulhern who had held the licensee of the hotel since its establishment in 1877. Mrs Sullivan had seven adult children from this marriage and the property passed to Denis George Mulhern in 1921. The building remained in use as a dwelling until the mid-1990s.

The 1885 building was sold for removal in 1905 to builder Frank Murch and was also moved across the road to an adjacent block also owned by the Sullivans. A photograph taken in 1906 shows that a verandah had then been added to the front and a room to the rear, presumably to make it more suitable for residential purposes.

In 1922 William and Hannah Volk became licensees of Telegraph Hotel and purchased the 1885 post office building as a residence. Mrs Volk died in 1970 and her home was offered to Tambo Shire Council as a museum. In 1973 the Tambo Shire Council took on responsibility for the building, offering it in 1992 as a venue for the Tambo Teddies scheme. This well-known and highly successful cottage industry project made and sold teddy bears made from local wool. The Teddies project has now moved into the former Tambo Shire Hall on the site of the Telegraph Hotel and the former post office buildings now comprise the Tambo Telecommunications Museum.

== Description ==
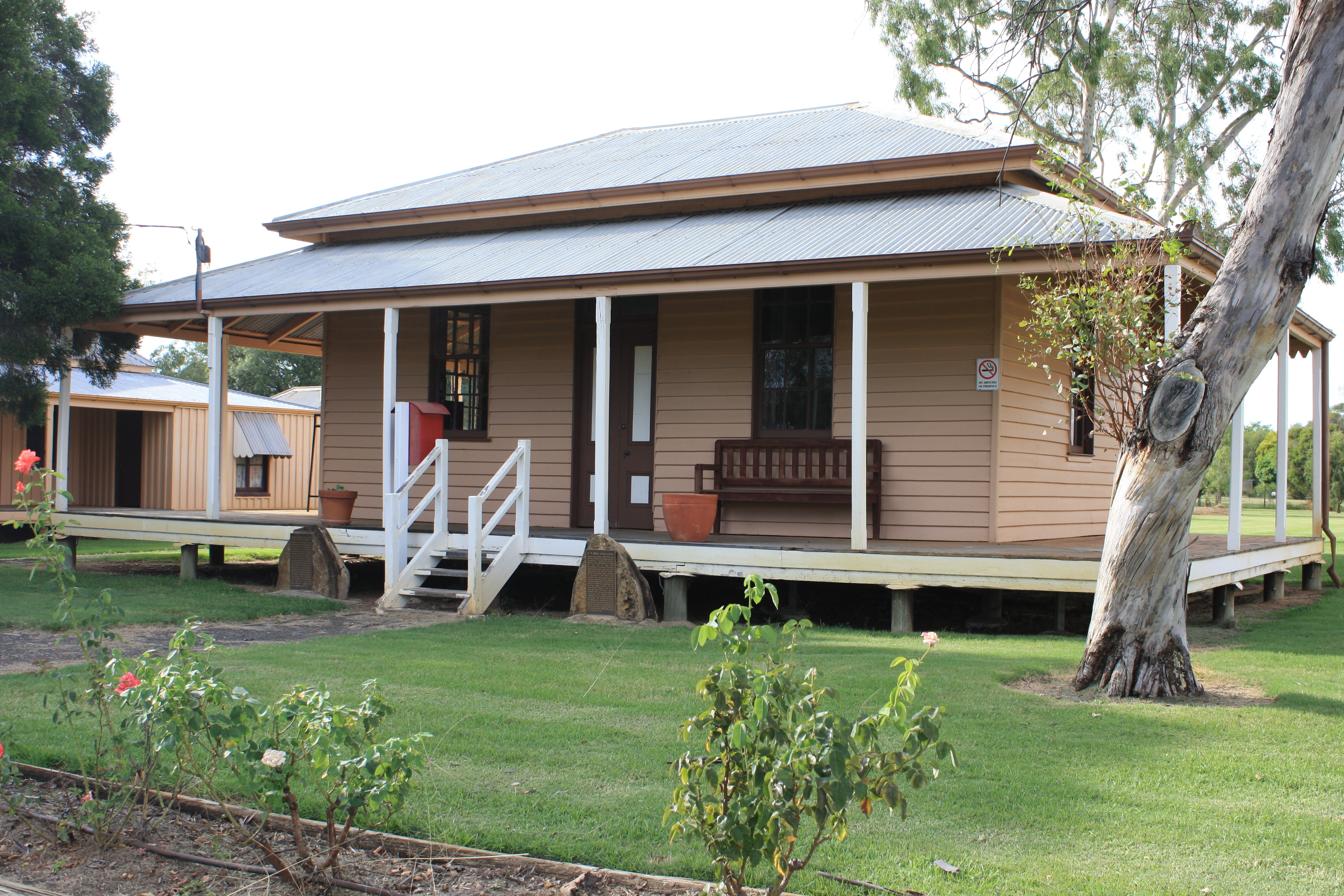
Tambo Electric Telegraph Office, built 1885

The two former post office buildings are timber structures situated adjacent to the Shire Council chambers and across the street from the 1904 Post Office.

The former 1876 post office is a timber building set on low stumps and constructed of vertical boards and battens with verandahs to all sides. It has a pyramidal roof clad in corrugated iron and the separate verandah awning is also of corrugated iron supported on timber posts. It has a four-room core with a central front door and casement windows. To the rear of the building there is a detached kitchen of similar construction comprising a single room with an awning along the front.

Alongside this building is the 1880s post office extension. This is also a timber building set on low stumps and is T shaped in plan, comprising two rooms facing the street and two rooms, set one behind the other, to the rear. The roof is clad with corrugated iron and is hipped over the front section and gabled at the rear. A verandah with a separate roof runs around the three sides of the front section and is supported on timber posts. The building has a central front door and sash windows.

== Heritage listing ==
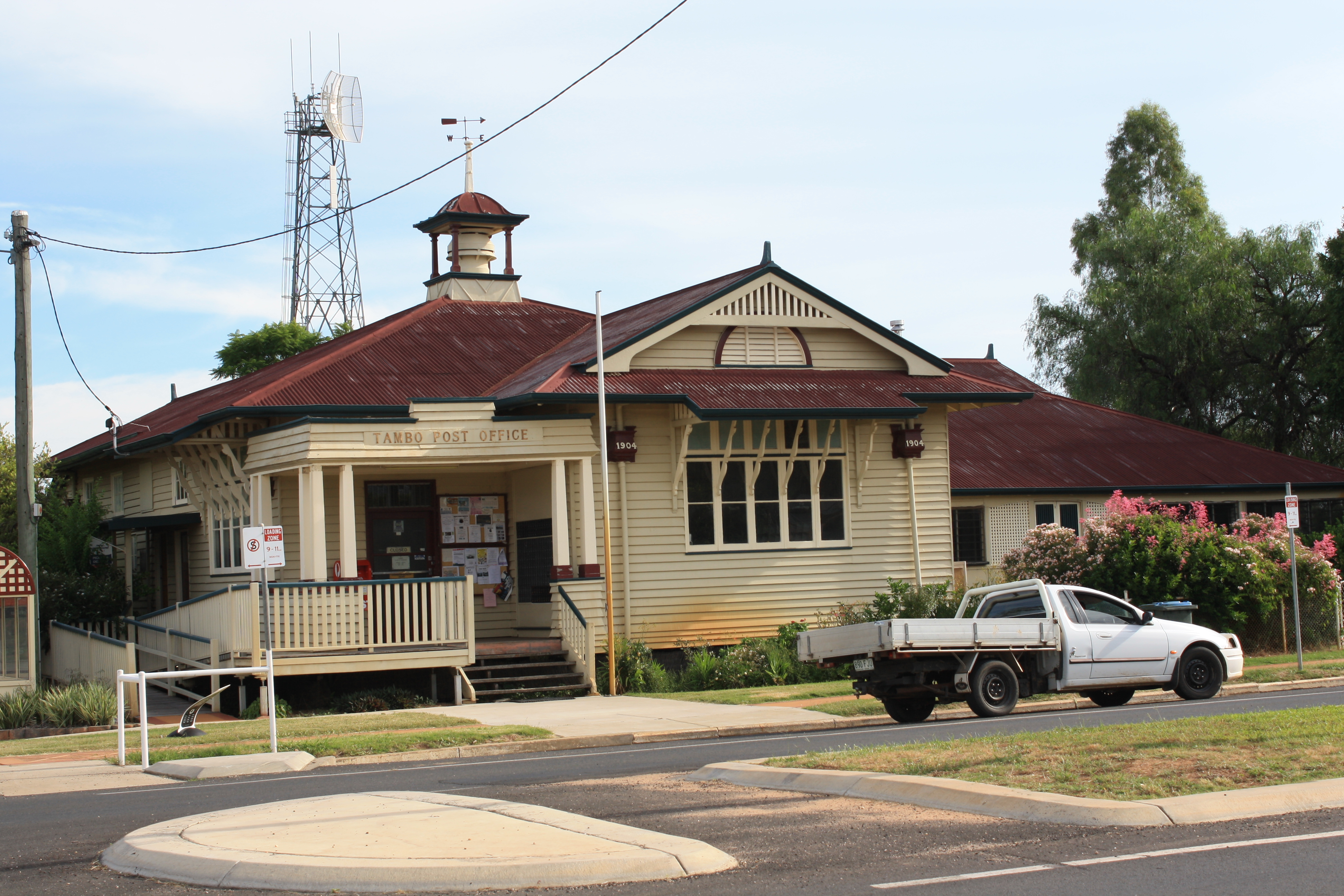
Post office built 1904 (not heritage-listed)

The former Tambo Post Office was listed on the Queensland Heritage Register on 21 October 1992 having satisfied the following criteria.

The place is important in demonstrating the evolution or pattern of Queensland's history.

The former Post Office at Tambo, comprising an 1876 office and separate 1885 extension, illustrates an important phase in the development of a communications network in Queensland. In the late 19th century Tambo was the main communication point in western Queensland north of Charleville and the rapid development of this network is evidenced by the fact that several post and telegraph buildings at Tambo were constructed in sequence as each building became inadequate.

The place demonstrates rare, uncommon or endangered aspects of Queensland's cultural heritage.

Although some alterations have occurred, the buildings, particularly the 1876 post office, are rare surviving examples of post office buildings of their era.

The place is important in demonstrating the principal characteristics of a particular class of cultural places.

They are good examples of architectural types developed at this time by the Public Works Department, which was instrumental in improving the quality of building design and construction in Queensland.

The place is important because of its aesthetic significance.

The former post office buildings have aesthetic significance as part of a series of public buildings along the main street of Tambo, including the courthouse, an early 20th century post office and the shire hall, which define the visual character of the township.
