= Brennan & Geraghtys Store =

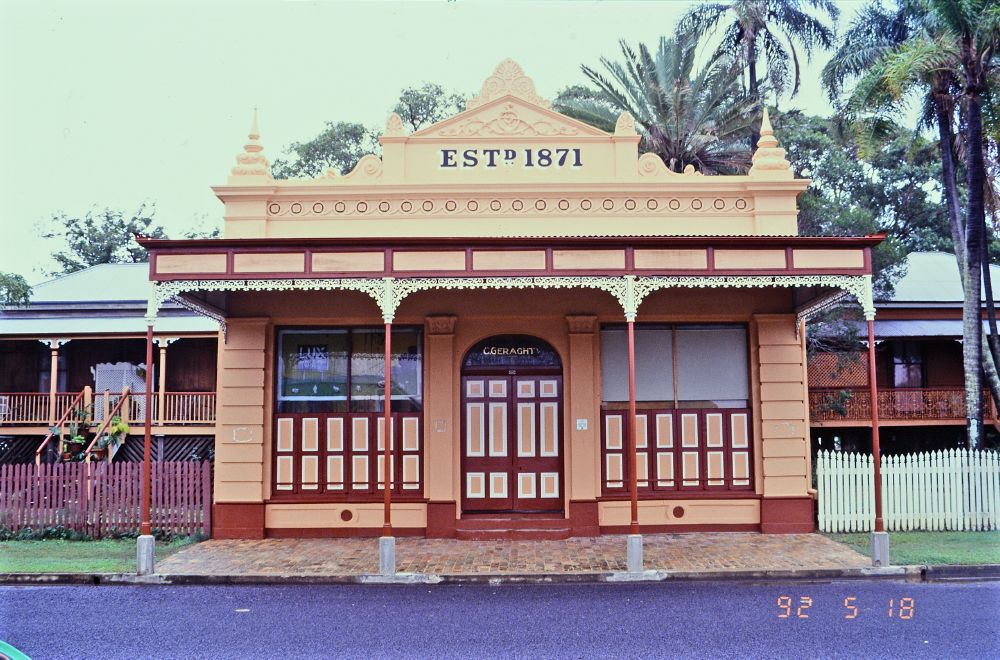
- Brennan & Geraghtys Store, 1992

- Location within Queensland Location within Australia
- 25.542°S 152.6966°E
- Location: 62–66 Lennox Street, Maryborough, Fraser Coast Region, Queensland, Australia

History
- Design period: 1840s–1860s (mid-19th century)
- Built: c. 1864–1904

Queensland Heritage Register
- Official name: Brennan & Geraghtys Store & two adjacent buildings and stables, Geraghty's Store
- Type: state heritage (built)
- Designated: 21 October 1992
- Reference no.: 600704
- Significant period: 1860s–1900s (fabric); 1871–1971 (historical use as store)
- Significant components: furniture/fittings, objects (movable) – retail/wholesale/services, pathway/walkway, residential accommodation – housing, fence/wall – perimeter, trees/plantings, shop/s, stables

Brennan & Geraghtys Store is a heritage-listed shop and National Trust-run museum at 62–66 Lennox Street, Maryborough, Fraser Coast Region, Queensland, Australia. It was built from c. 1864 to 1904. It is also known as Geraghty's Store. It was added to the Queensland Heritage Register on 21 October 1992.

== History ==
Brennan & Geraghty's Store was built by partners Patrick Brennan and Martin Geraghty in what was then a small commercial centre in Lennox Street, Maryborough. The store was operated by members of the same family until 1972, thus completing a century of trading, and contains original stock and trading records.

Maryborough was established at its present site in 1852 as an outlet for the trade of the Wide Bay and Burnett pastoral districts. Wool, tallow, cedar and kauri pine flowed outwards with backloads of essential supplies for the stations providing a thriving trade. Timber was milled there and the strong impetus provided by the discovery of gold at nearby Gympie in 1867 soon established Maryborough as a prosperous commercial and banking centre.

Maryborough was also a port of entry and 22,000 immigrants arrived there directly from overseas during the period 1862–1890.

In 1863, Patrick Brennan and Martin Geraghty arrived in Maryborough from Ireland. Brennan worked for some time as storekeeper at Kilkivan station and was involved in the early Gympie gold rush. Geraghty, who married Patrick's sister Catherine in 1864, bought land in Lennox Street and built a cottage at no. 64, from which he ran a joinery and undertaking business, then opened a store at what is now no. 60, in 1869. At the time, this section of the street supported a small commercial centre, including a hotel which was across the road from Geraghty's property.

In 1871 Patrick Brennan and Martin Geraghty formed a partnership and adapted Martin & Catherine's extended cottage as a store, after removing interior walls. They built a house next to the old store which they used as a receiving depot. Brennan & Geraghty's sold groceries and ordered stores in bulk, being the only importers in Maryborough. By the end of the 1870s, the families had set up orchards. They grew fruit, particularly oranges, to sell and for making marmalade and fruit wines at their factory, which may have incorporated the old store at no. 60. Their products were sold in the store and also wholesaled.

The 1880s saw the peak period of the Brennan and Geraghty business empire. The partnership was involved in a number of ventures, ranging from brickmaking to running a cross-river ferry service. In 1886, tenders were called to build a new, ornate facade on the front of the store. Store records show that a sum of £2 was paid to a Mr Hansen to prepare the plans. The contractors, G. Smith and G. Cordwell, began work in May 1886 and the completed work cost £211/14/10. Gas was installed at the same time. The rear room and trolley were added in 1887 at a cost of £60/9/5. The work was carried out by contractors Hansen and Stephenson.

This was a boom period in Maryborough as it was for Queensland generally. However, in the following decade Brennan & Geraghty's business began to fail and in 1896 a meeting of the creditors decided to liquidate the firm. In the years between 1886 and 1903, assets were disposed of and all debts were eventually paid out. The store itself was purchased by Frank Geraghty, Martin's son, who rented it back to Brennan & Geraghty for ten shillings a week.

In 1902 Michael Geraghty purchased the butcher's shop next door to the store which was owned by the Kruger family. By this time Lennox Street was predominantly residential as it is today. The butcher's shop was demolished and Michael built a house on the site for his mother, Catherine, following his father's death in 1904. This new house was named "Uskerty" after the birthplace in Ireland of Catherine Geraghty's mother.

From 1903, when the partnership of Brennan & Geraghty was finally dissolved, until her death in 1934, Catherine Geraghty ran the store with help from her family, particularly Agnes, Florence and George. In 1934 the Geraghty family also purchased The Cottage at 62 Lennox Street. This was a relocated building which incorporated a 1970s cottage with extensions possibly from the 1890s. The business continued to run until 1971, as George Geraghty wished to complete one hundred years of trading from the premises. He died in 1973.

Some of the contents of the house and store were sold after George Geraghty's death and a demolition order was placed on the store by the Maryborough City Council. The whole Geraghty complex was purchased by the National Trust in 1975. By this time, grocery shopping practices had changed and stores like Brennan & Geraghty's were rare. What made this store even rarer was that George had not made changes and had not disposed of stock or records. Many items in the store were no longer manufactured, or are now manufactured or sold in a different form. A fund raising campaign for the conservation of the store and contents was begun in the 1980s and had strong local support. In 1990 the store was opened to the public as a store museum.

== Description ==
Brennan & Geraghty's store museum is situated at 64 Lennox Street, Maryborough and is flanked by a house, "Uskerty", built for Catherine Geraghty in 1904, and a cottage owned by the Geraghty family since 1934.

The store is a large, timber-framed building on stumps with a gabled galvanised iron roof and a rendered brick facade. An awning supported on cast iron posts extends over the footpath. Two plate glass show windows flank the entrance and are protected by removable shutters.

The interior of the store is divided by two cross walls to form three main spaces. The front section is the shop and is subdivided by an arched screen along a line of former partitions. The centre section contains a small store room in one corner and the rear space is open and without a ceiling. All three rooms are linked by a trolley running on timber rails. The building contains fixed shelving, cabinets, counters, furniture and items associated with running the store.

The shop contains a collection of more than 100,000 items, all original to the store. Most stock items date from the interwar period but range from 1885 Canton tea to soap from the 1920s and toilet paper from the 1950s. They are displayed as shop stock and serve to illustrate changes to goods, household needs and shopping practices. An almost complete set of trading records for the store dates back to 1871 and there is an extensive collection of advertising material.

The structure of the shop is very intact and reveals a lifetime of changes which demonstrate the growth and recession of the business. The interior remains unpainted except for the shop area, where original painted finishes have been preserved. The exterior has been painted to match the last colour scheme which is believed to be interwar.

The stables are sited perpendicular to John Lane at the rear of allotment 10 and are a single skin weatherboard structure with a gabled galvanised iron roof. Floors are earth except for two rooms with timber floors at one end.

'Uskerty' is set back from Lennox Street with more pretension than the cottage at no 62. It is a medium-sized, single skin, timber-framed and sheeted house on stumps with a galvanised iron roof. It contains four main rooms, a hallway and a kitchen wing containing two additional rooms. The house has verandahs on three sides with cast iron balustrading. The rear part of one verandah is enclosed to form two additional rooms. The house is intact and includes elements probably recycled from the butcher's shop. The garden is fairly intact with pathways and mature trees and is divided from the street by a timber fence and gates with a scalloped top and shaped pickets.

The cottage faces Lennox Street and has a picket fence and gate. It is timber framed and sheeted, high set on stumps with a galvanised iron roof. The exterior walls are lined with weatherboards on the sides and chamferboards on the back. There is a simple verandah on the front and the back verandah has been enclosed to form a kitchen and bathroom. The interiors are intact, retaining original joinery and hardware with unpainted main rooms.

Portions of the split post and rail fences which marked the allotments between the buildings remain. Those immediately behind the store are reconstructed from second hand material.

== Heritage listing ==
Brennan & Geraghtys Store & two adjacent buildings and stables was listed on the Queensland Heritage Register on 21 October 1992 having satisfied the following criteria.

The place is important in demonstrating the evolution or pattern of Queensland's history.

It also illustrates the changing fortunes of the Brennan & Geraghty business which was a significant trading enterprise in nineteenth century Maryborough, a town which was important as a trading centre.

The place demonstrates rare, uncommon or endangered aspects of Queensland's cultural heritage.

Brennan & Geraghty's Store is significant for its rarity as a grocery store which survives intact with its own stock and trading records.

The place has potential to yield information that will contribute to an understanding of Queensland's history.

It has the potential to yield information that demonstrates changes in grocery retailing and purchasing in Queensland over a century.

The place is important in demonstrating the principal characteristics of a particular class of cultural places.

It is an unusually intact example of a type of store which was once common in Queensland. In addition, the Geraghty houses flanking the store are good, representative examples of south east Queensland timber houses from the late nineteenth and early twentieth centuries.

The place has a special association with the life or work of a particular person, group or organisation of importance in Queensland's history.

It also illustrates the changing fortunes of the Brennan & Geraghty business which was a significant trading enterprise in nineteenth century Maryborough, a town which was important as a trading centre.
