= Wellshot Station =

Pastoral lease in Queensland, Australia

Location in Queensland

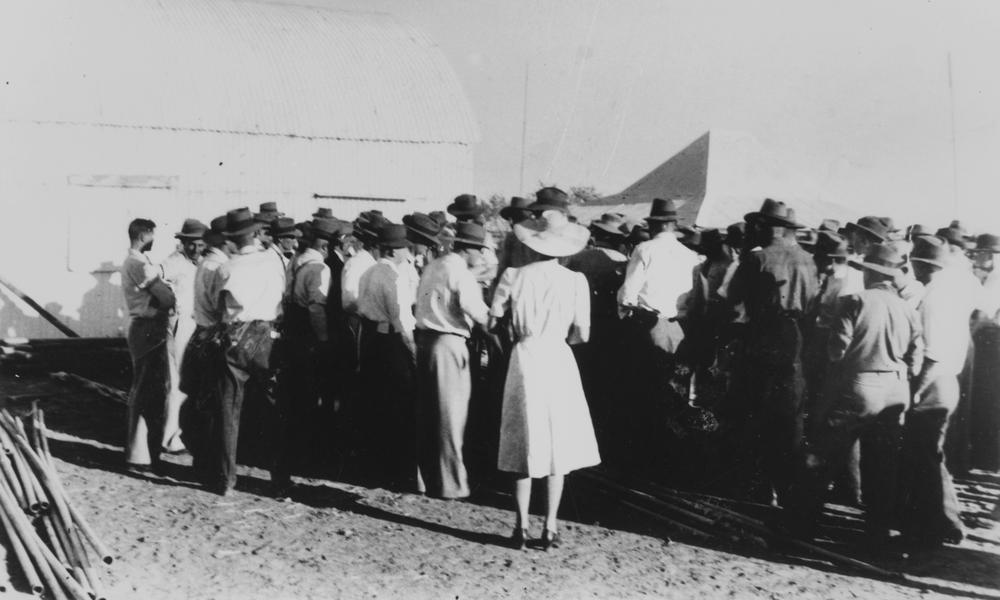
Clearing sale at Wellshot 1947

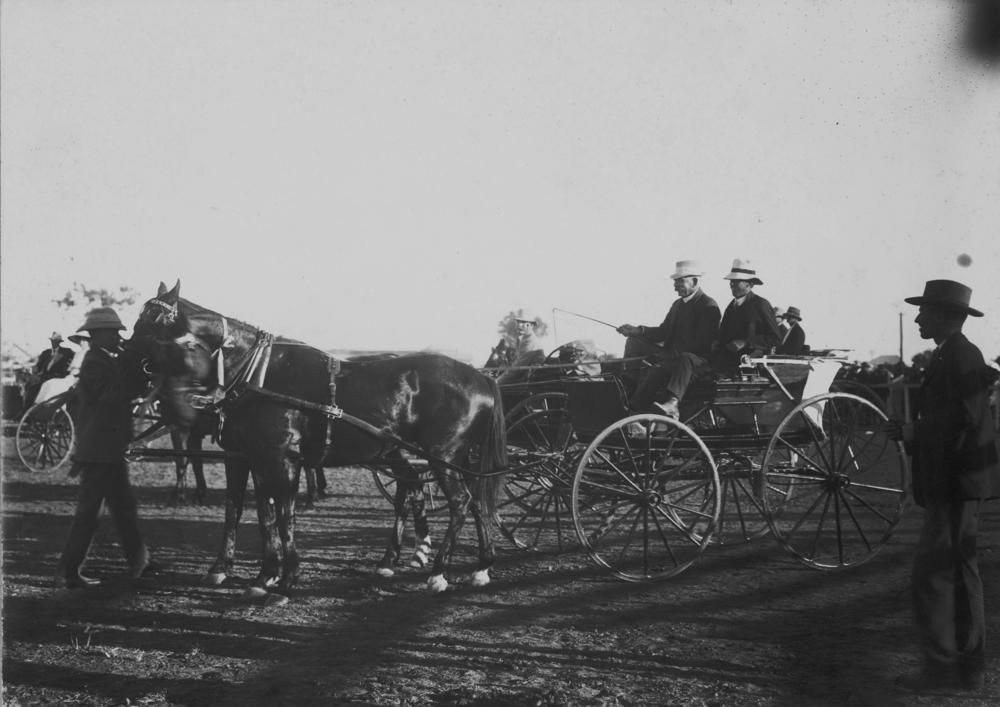
Buggy competitors at Longreach Show

Wellshot Station is a pastoral lease that operates as a sheep station. It is located about 45 kilometres (28 mi) south of Ilfracombe and 175 kilometres (109 mi) north of Jundah in Queensland, Australia.

== History ==
The station was established in 1872 when Alexander Buchanan acquired 1,000,000 acres (4,047 km^{2}) of land which formed the initial station. Buchanan sought financial assistance from Scottish and New Zealand backers to develop the property and build permanent waterholes. The backers were the New Zealand and Australian Land Company based in Scotland, and the name Wellshot was taken from a major shareholder's estate near Glasgow.

In 1876, the property had an estimated size of 1,821 square miles (4,716 km^{2}) running westward to the Thomson River and Westlands Station, bordered by Darling Downs to the south and Beaconsfield Station to the north.

Neither the river or creeks are perennial and even if they were it would still be too long a distance to the centre of the run to make it useful. The average rainfall is 22 inches (559 mm), but at irregular times, so water was a priority. The station manager set to work and constructed many dams and tanks to capture as much rainfall as practicable. 48 reservoirs with a volume of 35,000 cubic yards (26,759 m^{3}) were excavated. Several bores were sunk as far 3,500 feet (1,067 m) to find water, giving a regular supply of 1.3 million gallons.

In 1881 and again in 1884, the area was struck by drought resulting in terrible stock losses.

A total of 27 stockmen from Wellshot moved the biggest ever single mob of sheep when a flock of 43,000 were droved through the area in 1886.

Industrial trouble arose at Wellshot later in 1886 during shearing when shearers would not accept conditions proposed by the employer and promptly went on strike. News of the strike spread swiftly through surrounding districts and the men marched on Blackall, the centre of Queensland via Portland Downs, Isis Downs and Thornleigh until over 600 men had joined in. As a result, the Shearers' Union was born.

In the early 1890s approximately 600 square miles (1,554 km^{2}) were resumed in accordance with the Land Act, leaving 1,200 square miles (3,108 km^{2}) of "excellent grazing country". The resumed portions, mostly along the northern and western boundaries, were put up for selection and eagerly acquired. The townsites of Ilfracombe and Longreach were amongst the resumed portions.

In 1892, Wellshot was known as the biggest sheep station in the world, not because of the area it occupied but because of the number of sheep it ran: 460,000. So important was the property that Ilfracombe was known as Wellshot until 1890. 40,000 two-year-old wethers were sold off from the property later the same year.

An epic drove was performed by the Tibbett brothers in the 1890s when they droved a flock of 30,000 ewes from Wellshot to Roma, a distance of over 700 kilometres (435 mi), in search of grass for the stock. The sheep were all shorn in Roma and lambing started as relieving rains came to Wellshot. The flock was brought back with an additional 3,000 lambs.

In 1897, there was a flock of 387,000 merino sheep on the property which had produced 5801 bales of wool.

A serious bushfire broke out resulting from lightning strike at the property in 1918. The glare could be seen from Springlea homestead, some 40 miles (64 km) distant.

James Inglis was the station manager from 1906 to 1925. He had joined the New Zealand and Australian Land Company in 1888 and worked at both Wellshot and Eddington Station before returning to Wellshot to manage the property. Inglis's son Eric Ronald (3 June 1898 – 16 February 1991) later documented life on the station in a memoir: "When we arrived at Wellshot many of the facilities were run down and below standard, and Father had much renovation and rebuilding work done. This was greatly appreciated. There were usually about five or six jackaroos at the station, as well as an overseer, book keeper, blacksmith, engineer, horse boy, a head musterer and about seven musterers, and a married couple. The male half of the married couple would cook and his wife would do all the housekeeping at the station.". Eric Inglis served with the 11th Light Horse Regiment in World War I and wrote a memoir titled Days Long Since.

William Clarkson was the next manager who remained at Wellshot until 1933.

A station hand, Reuben Hunt, died at Wellshot shortly after being bitten a caterpillar during his lunch break in 1935. The caterpillar had fallen into his shirt as he sat under a tree then bitten him, he was swiftly covered in a painful rash and started vomiting. He was taken to the homestead but died en route to the hospital in Longreach. Later that year in June, 50,000 sheep were moved from the property in 400 railway trucks and sent off to Boatman Station. In December of the same year the area was struck by a heatwave with the station recording a maximum temperature of 122 °F (50 °C).

The lease for Wellshot expired in 1948, so the New Zealand and Australian Land Company had to truck about 30,000 sheep from the property in readiness to allow the station to be cut up for closer settlement. Later the same year the station was hit by a storm and suffered significant damage from cyclonic gales and heavy hail. The manager, Mr MacIntyre, reported the hail tore holes in the iron roofs and was packed to a depth of one foot on the verandah.

An unstocked 20,000 acres (8,094 ha) homestead block on the station was sold for £35,000 in 1953. The purchasers were the Gordon brothers of Gordonvale, another Wellshot selection.

== Museum ==
The Wellshot Centre at 6–10 McMaster Drive, Ilfracombe (23.4893°S 144.5051°E) is a museum dedicated to the history of the Wellshot Station.

== See also ==
- List of ranches and stations
