= Aboriginal dugout canoe =

Australian Aboriginal boat

Aboriginal dugout canoes were a significant advancement in canoe technology. Dugout canoes may have been stronger, faster, and more efficient than previous types of bark canoes. The Australian Aboriginal peoples' use of these canoes brought about many changes to both their hunting practices and society.

== History ==
Aboriginal people began using dugout canoes from around 1640 in coastal regions of northern Australia. They were brought by Buginese fishers of sea cucumbers, known as trepangers, from Makassar in South Sulawesi.

In Arnhem Land, dugout canoes used by the local Yolngu people are called lipalipa or lippa-lippa.

== Construction ==
Aboriginal canoes were constructed much more easily than previous types of vessels, such as bark canoes. This ease of construction played a significant role in the dugout canoes’ widespread use. While earlier vessels required a great deal of labor and time-consuming sewing to make, dugout canoes were constructed easily and in a shorter period of time. First, one would have to cut down a tree and shape the exterior into an even form. The sides of the canoe were shaped in one of two ways. They were either carved straight up and down or in a "u" shape, curving in towards the center of the boat. Next, one would have to dig out the inner wood of the log to make space for the oarsmen to sit and paddle. In some early dugout canoes, Aboriginal people would not make the bottoms of the canoes smooth, but would instead carve "ribbing" into the vessel. Ribbing (literally sections of wood that looked like ribs) was used to stabilize bark canoes, and though not necessary to dugout canoes, was a carryover in the transition from one canoe type to the other. Both the chopping down of the tree and the digging out of the log were easily done with an iron-axe.

The wood used in the construction of dugout canoes was essential to its strength and durability. A wide variety of trees were used depending upon the location of a particular people, but in most cases the Aboriginal people used a type of native sycamore, possibly Litsea reticulata or Cryptocarya glaucescens (Silver sycamore), White sycamore (Polyscias elegans or Cryptocarya obovata), Ceratopetalum succirubrum (Satin sycamore), Cardwellia sublimia, Cryptocarya hypospodia (Bastard Sycamore), Ceratopetalum virchowii (Pink Sycamore) or Ceratopetalum corymbosum (Mountain sycamore). Sycamores are strong and extremely durable, making them suitable for use in the construction of dugout canoes.

== Uses ==
Both sea turtles and dugongs were essential components of the Aboriginal diet. The transformation from bark canoes to dugout canoes greatly increased the ability of the tribal hunters to catch and kill both of these types of sea creatures due primarily to a more formidable structure. Dugout canoes included a stronger and better platform for harpooning that greatly increased the stability of an upright hunter by providing essential footing. In order to capture dugongs and sea turtles, the hunters needed to maintain the utmost degree of stealth. Perfect balance was required and the new dugout canoes gave the hunters this necessary edge.

Additionally, the shift towards using dugout canoes maximized the overall possibilities of seafarers. Not only did increased sturdiness, speed and stability of Dugout canoes make hunting easier, but these characteristics also allowed for long-distance travel. Whereas bark canoes had been only used for inland use or travel extremely close to the shore, Dugout canoes offered a far greater range of travel which allowed for trade outside the area of the village. Dugout canoes were capable of traveling distances over 500 km. This new vessel gave the Aboriginal people the ability and opportunity to explore, trade and locate additional resources located outside the central location.

== Impacts ==
The widespread use of dugout canoes had many impacts on Aboriginal life. The most significant were results of the Aboriginal peoples' ability to hunt larger prey. With the strength to transport larger prey over longer distances, dugout enabled the peoples to vastly expand their hunting grounds. This larger prey also enabled support of a larger group of people over a longer period of time. This increase in the ability to support population led to both population growth and expansion.

== Torres Strait Islander boats ==
Torres Strait Islander people, another Indigenous Australian group of peoples, used a different type of boat – a double outrigger, unique to their area and evidence suggests their use dates back at least 2,500 years.

These boats could be up to 21 metres (69 ft) long and could sail across networks as far as 700–800 kilometres (430–500 mi) and carry up to 12 people. Using these boat Torres Strait Islander peoples, including the Kulkalgal people, were able to form social and trading relationships amongst each other and groups in Papua New Guinea. These relationships where of great benefit to them as it meant that they could offset the dry season and take advantage of periods of abundance.
