= Sycamore =

Sycamore is a name which has been applied to several types of trees, but with somewhat similar leaf forms. The name derives from the Ancient Greek σῡκόμορος (sykómoros) meaning 'fig-mulberry'.

Species of otherwise unrelated trees known as sycamore:

- Acer pseudoplatanus, a species of maple native to central Europe and southwestern Asia, known as the sycamore in British English and sycamore maple in North American English
- Ficus sycomorus, the sycamore (or sycomore) of the Bible; a species of fig, also called the sycamore fig or fig-mulberry, native to the Middle East and eastern Africa
- Platanus orientalis, chinar tree (Old World sycamore)
- Some North American members of the genus Platanus, including
  - Platanus occidentalis, the American sycamore
  - Platanus racemosa, the California sycamore or western sycamore
  - Platanus wrightii, the Arizona sycamore
  - Platanus mexicana, the Mexican sycamore
- In Australia, there are numerous trees which have the common name "sycamore":
  - Litsea reticulata or Cryptocarya glaucescens (silver sycamore)
  - Polyscias elegans (white sycamore)
  - Cryptocarya obovata (white sycamore)
  - Ceratopetalum succirubrum (satin sycamore)
  - Cardwellia sublimis (bower sycamore )
  - Cryptocarya hypospodia (bastard sycamore)
  - Ceratopetalum virchowii (pink sycamore)
  - Ceratopetalum corymbosum (mountain sycamore)
