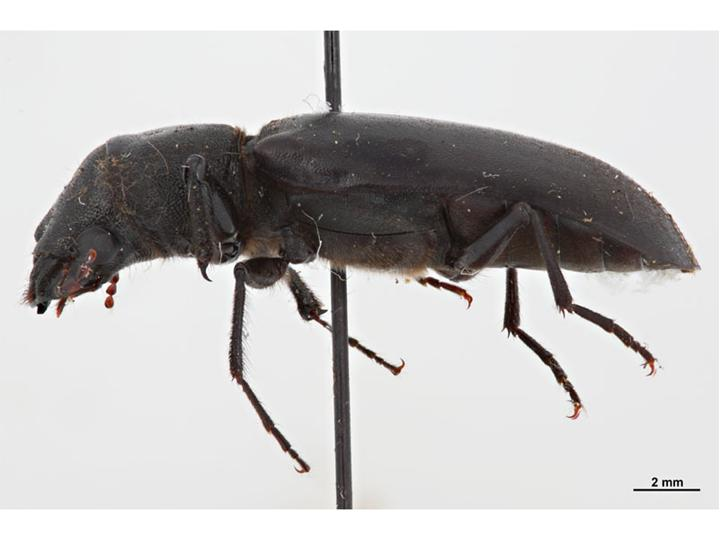

Scientific classification
- Domain: Eukaryota
- Kingdom: Animalia
- Phylum: Arthropoda
- Class: Insecta
- Order: Coleoptera
- Suborder: Polyphaga
- Family: Bostrichidae
- Genus: Polycaon
- Species: P. stoutii

Binomial name
- Polycaon stoutii (LeConte, 1853)

= Polycaon stoutii =

Species of beetle

Polycaon stoutii, the black polycaon or Stout's branch borer, is a species of woodboring beetle in the Bostrichidae family. It is found in North America in British Columbia, the Pacific Coast states, and Arizona, but has spread elsewhere due to the shipping of wood products.

== Relationship with wood ==
Polycaon stoutii breeds in hardwoods. The female bores into the wood and lays its eggs in a tunnel. Usually, these host trees are dead or dying, but they are reported to bore into healthy ones as well. Recorded host trees include redwood, coast live oak, maple, manzanita, madrone, California laurel, sycamore, hickory, mahogany, ash, and various fruit trees. Infestation can occur before the trees have been harvested or in a lumberyard.

Larvae develop inside the wood for at least a year, but can remain there for over twenty years before emerging as adults. They are known for occasionally emerging from wooden furniture.

== Description ==
Adults are 10-23 mm in length. They are cylindrical, hairy, and black. Their heads are slightly downturned.

Polycaon stoutii can be distinguished from the related P. granulatus by the antennae having 11 segments and the 2nd and 3rd tarsal segments being cylindrical. It can be distinguished from P. punctatus by its black colouration and the 3rd antennal segment being much shorter than the 4th.
