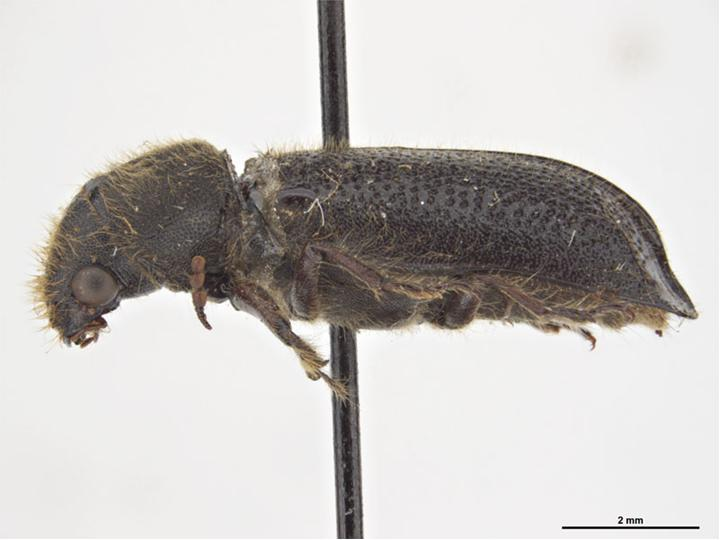
- Melalgus batillus

Scientific classification
- Kingdom: Animalia
- Phylum: Arthropoda
- Class: Insecta
- Order: Coleoptera
- Suborder: Polyphaga
- Family: Bostrichidae
- Subfamily: Polycaoninae
- Genus: Melalgus; Dejean, 1833

= Melalgus =

Genus of beetles

Melalgus is a genus of horned powder-post beetles in the family Bostrichidae. There are more than 20 described species in Melalgus.

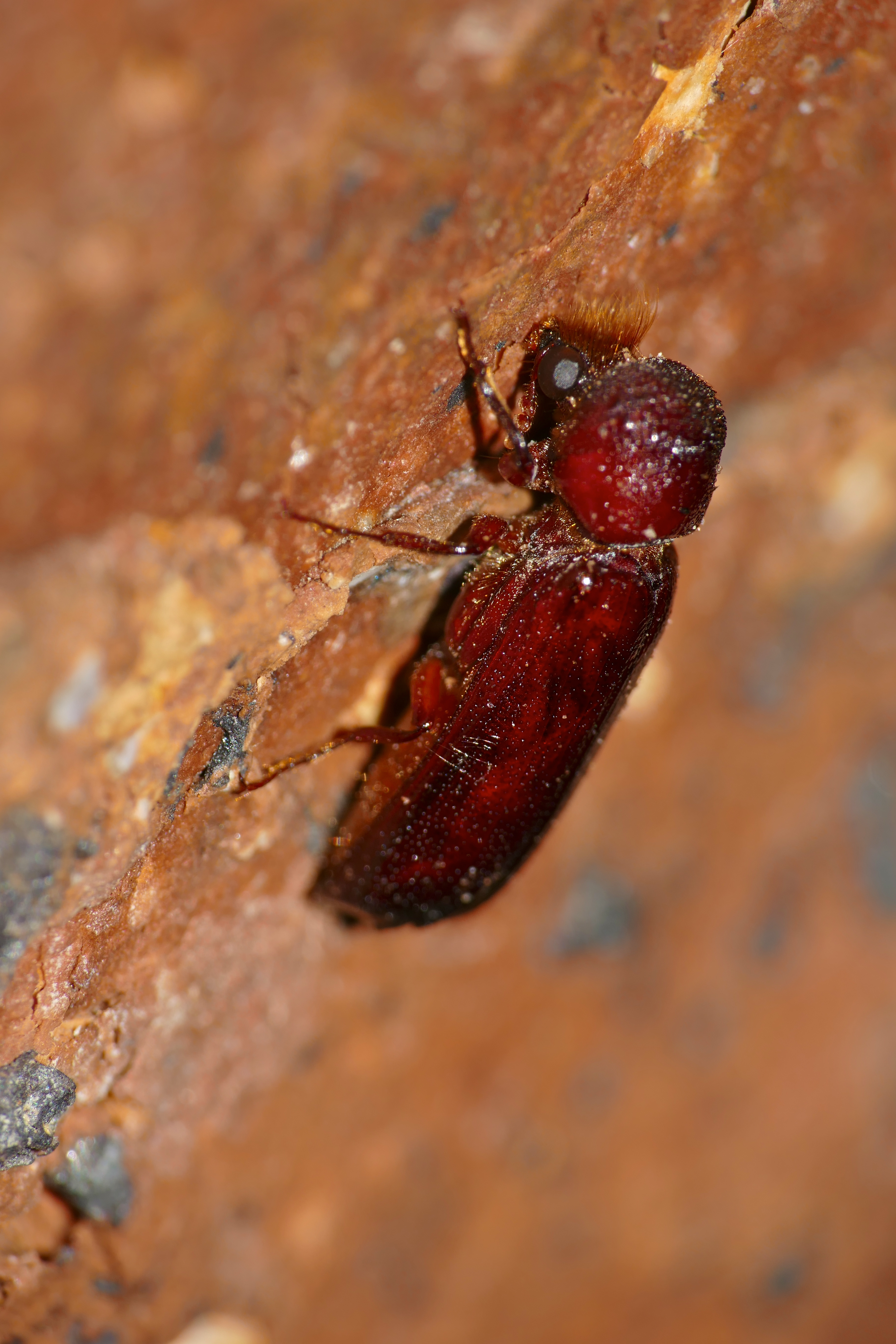
Melalgus femoralis

== Species ==
These 25 species belong to the genus Melalgus:

- Melalgus amoenus (Lesne, 1911)
- Melalgus batillus (Lesne, 1902)
- Melalgus borneensis (Lesne, 1911)
- Melalgus caribeanus (Lesne, 1906)
- Melalgus confertus (LeConte, 1866) (branch and twig borer)
- Melalgus crassulus (Lesne, 1911)
- Melalgus digueti (Lesne, 1911)
- Melalgus exesus (LeConte, 1858)
- Melalgus feanus (Lesne, 1899)
- Melalgus femoralis (Fabricius, 1792)
- Melalgus gonagrus (Fabricius, 1798)
- Melalgus gracilipes (Blanchard, 1843)
- Melalgus jamaicensis (Lesne, 1906)
- Melalgus japonicum Chûjô, 1973
- Melalgus longitarsus (Lesne, 1911)
- Melalgus megalops (Fall, 1901)
- Melalgus parvidens (Lesne, 1895)
- Melalgus parvulus (Lesne, 1925)
- Melalgus plicatus (LeConte, 1874)
- Melalgus rufipes (Blanchard, 1843)
- Melalgus strigipennis (Lesne, 1937)
- Melalgus subdepressus (Lesne, 1897)
- Melalgus talpula (Lesne, 1911)
- Melalgus truncatus (Guérin-Méneville, 1844)
- Melalgus valleculatus (Lesne, 1913)
