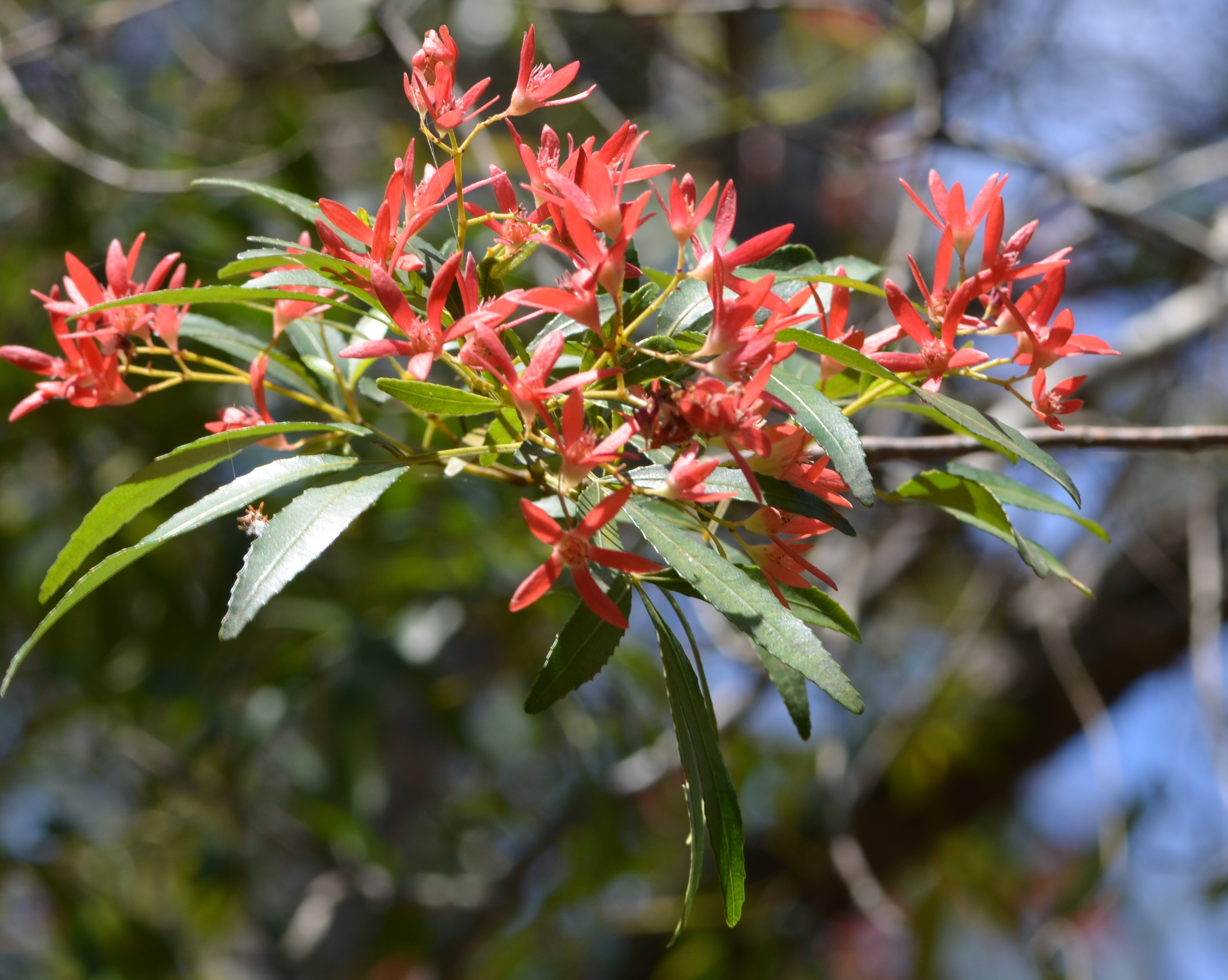
- Flowering branch of Ceratopetalum gummiferum

Conservation status
- Least Concern (IUCN 3.1)

Scientific classification
- Kingdom: Plantae
- Clade: Tracheophytes
- Clade: Angiosperms
- Clade: Eudicots
- Clade: Rosids
- Order: Oxalidales
- Family: Cunoniaceae
- Genus: Ceratopetalum
- Species: C. gummiferum

Binomial name
- Ceratopetalum gummiferum Sm.

= Ceratopetalum gummiferum =

New South Wales Christmas bush

Species of flowering plant

Ceratopetalum gummiferum, the New South Wales Christmas bush, is a tall shrub or small tree popular in cultivation due to its sepals that turn bright red-pink at around Christmas time.

The specific name gummiferum alludes to the large amounts of gum that is discharged from cut bark.

== Description ==
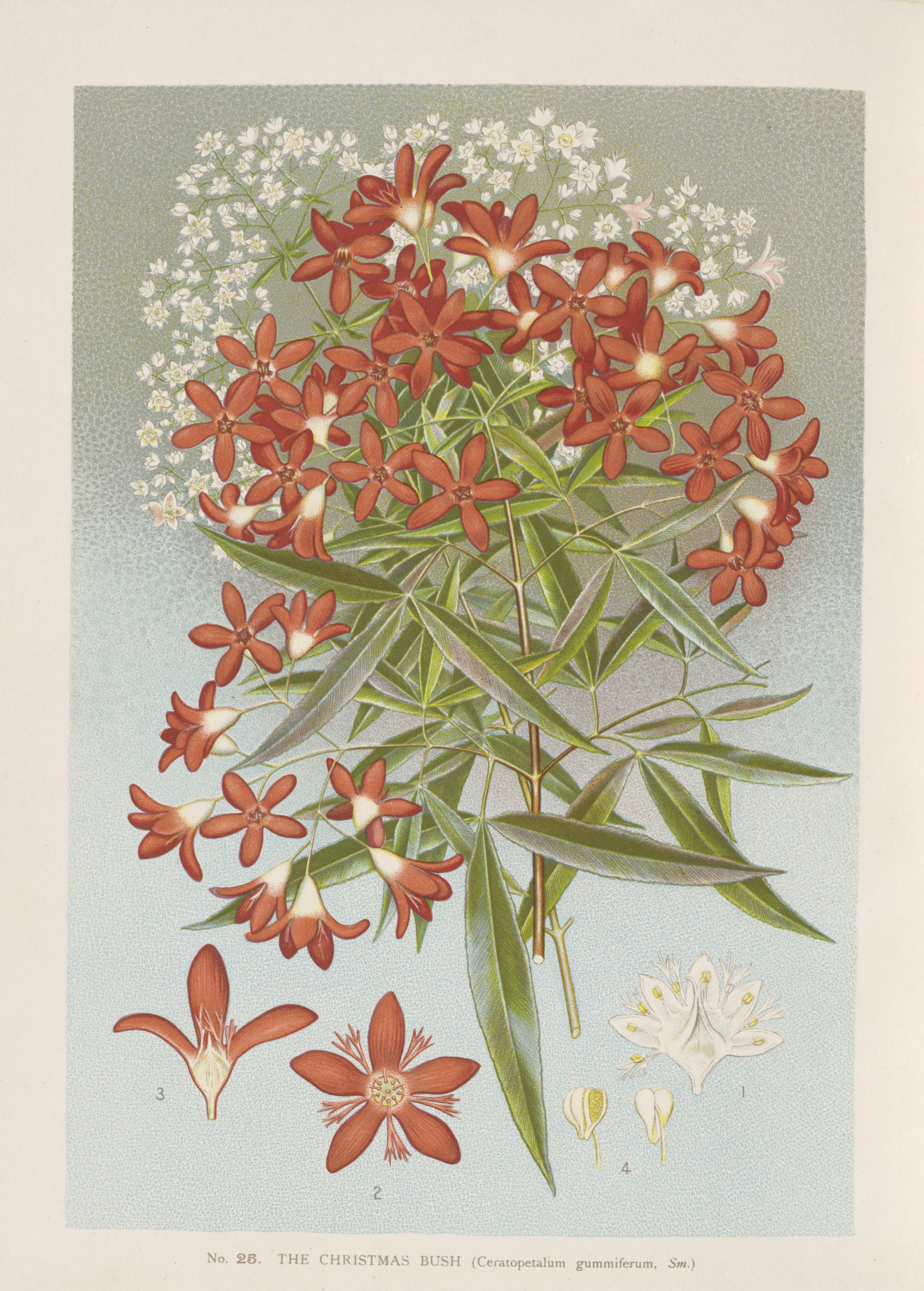
Painting of Christmas bush by Edward Minchen

Plants initially grow as rounded shrubs but mature to pyramidical trees. The leaves comprise three leaflets and are up to 8 cm long. The petioles are grooved on the upper side and are 10 to 20 mm long.

=== Inflorescence ===
Small, white five-petalled flowers appear in sprays from October in the species' native range. As these die the sepals enlarge and become pink to red in colour, the display peaking at Christmas time in Australia. The petals are actually small and white – it is the sepals that enlarge to about 12mm after the flower sets fruit and starts to dry out.

== Taxonomy ==
Ceratopatalum gummiferum is one of nine species in the genus Ceratopetalum which occur in Australia and Papua New Guinea. The species was first formally described by English botanist James Edward Smith in 1793 in A Specimen of the Botany of New Holland.

== Distribution and habitat ==
The species is endemic to New South Wales where it occurs to the east of the Great Dividing Range from Ulladulla in the south to Evans Head in the north.

== Cultivation ==
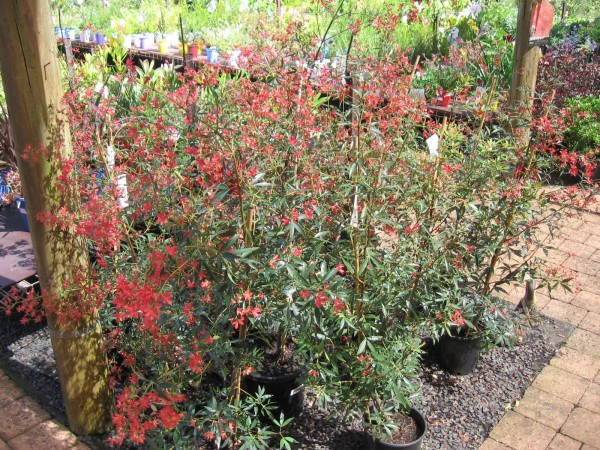
Pot plants in cultivation

In cultivation, plants usually grow to no more than 6 metres in height. Plants may be propagated from seed or cuttings, the latter method being preferred to maintain good colour forms. Well-drained soil is required to avoid problems with dieback associated with root-rot fungus. The psyllid Cerotrioza nigromacula is a serious pest, causing leaf curling and (via growth of sooty mould) blackening of foliage. Severe infestations of C. nigromacula can stunt growth.
