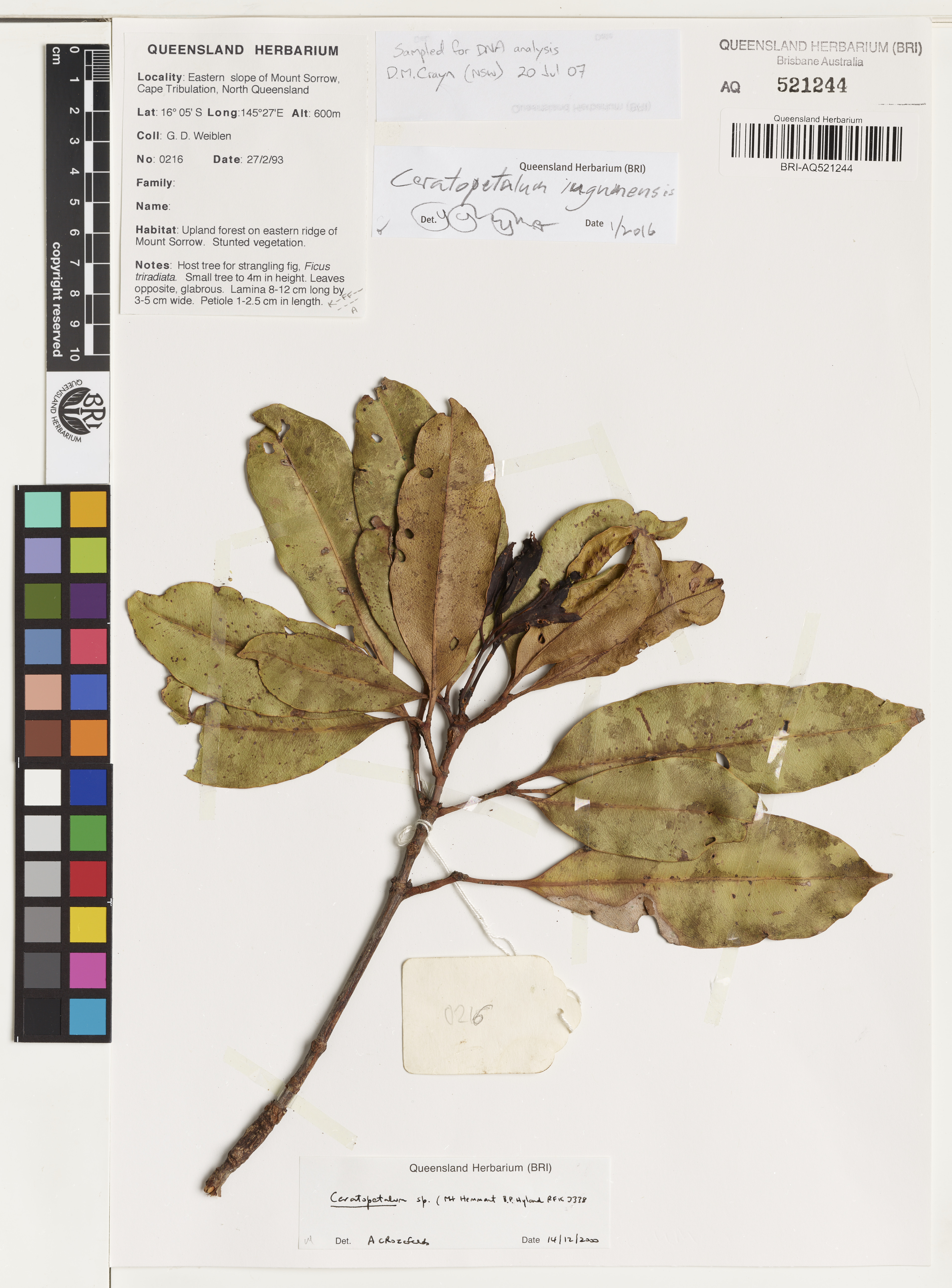

Conservation status
- Least Concern (NCA)

Scientific classification
- Kingdom: Plantae
- Clade: Tracheophytes
- Clade: Angiosperms
- Clade: Eudicots
- Clade: Rosids
- Order: Oxalidales
- Family: Cunoniaceae
- Genus: Ceratopetalum
- Species: C. iugumense

Binomial name
- Ceratopetalum iugumense Rozefelds & R.W.Barnes

= Ceratopetalum iugumense =

Species of flowering plant

Ceratopetalum iugumense is a species of plant in the family Cunoniaceae, native to a small area of northeast Queensland, Australia. It is a small rainforest tree, first described in 2002, and is restricted to the highlands inland from Cape Tribulation, at altitudes around 600–700 m (2,000–2,300 ft).

In the paper in which it was initially described, the authors Andrew Carl Frank Rozefelds and Richard W. Barnes refer to this species as Ceratopetalum iugumensis. That name is now only used by Queensland authorities, while the Australian Plant Census uses a form with a modified ending, Ceratopetalum iugumense. The latter form is also recognised by international authorities.

This species is listed as least concern under the Queensland Government's Nature Conservation Act.
