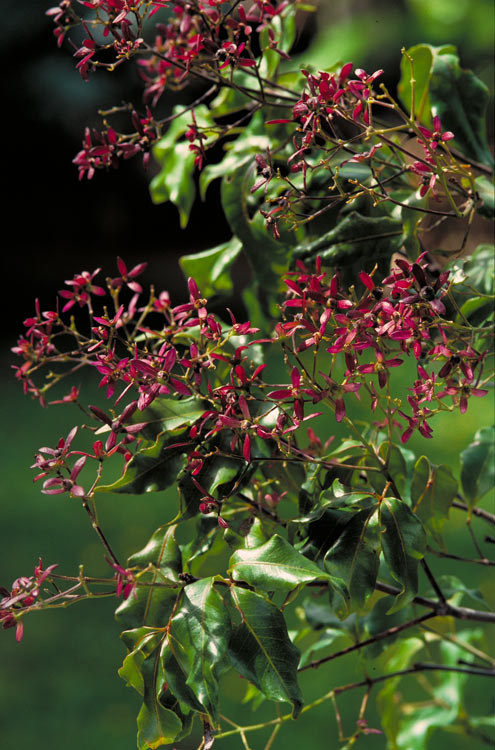

Conservation status
- Least Concern (IUCN 3.1)

Scientific classification
- Kingdom: Plantae
- Clade: Tracheophytes
- Clade: Angiosperms
- Clade: Eudicots
- Clade: Rosids
- Order: Oxalidales
- Family: Cunoniaceae
- Genus: Ceratopetalum
- Species: C. hylandii

Binomial name
- Ceratopetalum hylandii Rozefelds & R.W.Barnes

= Ceratopetalum hylandii =

Species of flowering plant

Ceratopetalum hylandii is a species of plant in the family Cunoniaceae, native to a small area of northeast Queensland, Australia. It is a small rainforest tree, first described in 2002, and is restricted to the highland rainforest.

== Description ==
Ceratopetalum hylandii is a tree reaching up to 20 m (66 ft) in height and a trunk diameter up to 40 cm (16 in). The trunk may be buttressed. The leaves are trifoliate and are arranged in decussate pairs. The petiole may reach 4 cm (1.6 in) in length. The leaflets may be attached on a very short stem or stemless. They have toothed margins and about 10–15 lateral veins on either side of the midrib; the central leaflet can reach up to 10 cm (3.9 in) long and 4 cm (1.6 in) wide, and the lateral leaflets are slightly smaller.

The inflorescences are produced from the leaf axils or at the end of the branches. The flowers have four sepals about 2.5 mm (0.10 in) long, but have no petals. The fruit is a four-winged purple samara about 25 mm (0.98 in) diameter.

== Distribution and habitat ==
This species is found in highland areas of Mount Spurgeon and Mount Lewis, inland from Mossman Gorge, between 1,000 and 1,400 m (3,300 and 4,600 ft) altitude. Recent examination of an old collection suggests that it may also be found at the eastern edge of the Atherton Tableland at Topaz.

== Conservation status ==
This species is listed as least concern under the Queensland Government's Nature Conservation Act, and by the International Union for Conservation of Nature.

== Etymology ==
It was named in honour of Australian botanist Bernard Hyland, in recognition of his input into the study of Queensland's flora, particularly the Wet Tropics.
