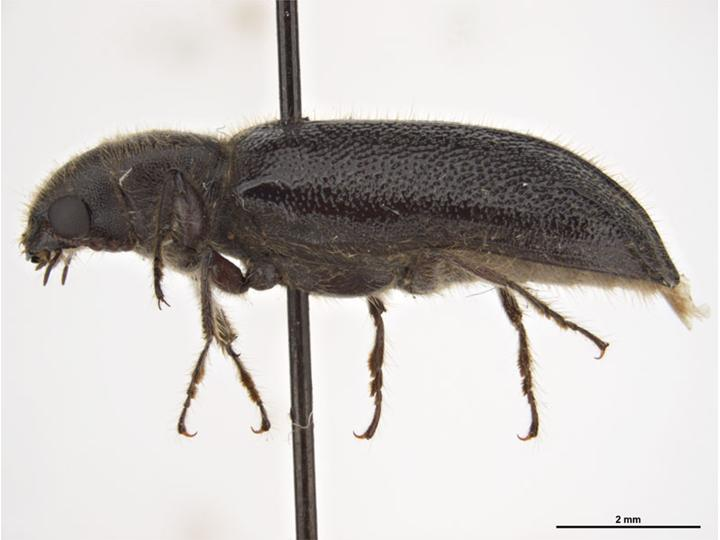

Scientific classification
- Kingdom: Animalia
- Phylum: Arthropoda
- Class: Insecta
- Order: Coleoptera
- Suborder: Polyphaga
- Family: Bostrichidae
- Genus: Melalgus
- Species: M. plicatus

Binomial name
- Melalgus plicatus (LeConte, 1874)

= Melalgus plicatus =

Species of beetle

Melalgus plicatus is a species of horned powder-post beetle in the family Bostrichidae. It is found in Central America, North America, and South America.

== Notes ==
- Solomon, J. D. (1995). "Guide to insect borers in North American broadleaf trees and shrubs". USDA Forest Service Agriculture Handbook.
- Fisher, W. S. (1950). "A revision of the North American species of beetles belonging to the family Bostrichidae". United States Department of Agriculture Miscellaneous Publication (698): 1–157. hdl:2027/uva.x030450778.
- Borowski, Jerzy; Wegrzynowicz, Piotr (2007). World Catalogue of Bostrichidae (Coleoptera). Wydawnictwo Mantis. ISBN 9788392618218.
- Lobl, I.; Smetana, A., eds. (2007). Catalogue of Palaearctic Coleoptera, Volume 4: Elateroidea - Derodontoidea - Bostrichoidea - Lymexyloidea - Cleroidea - Cucujoidea. Apollo Books. ISBN 978-8788757675.
