= Scarred tree =

Trees carved by Aboriginal Australians

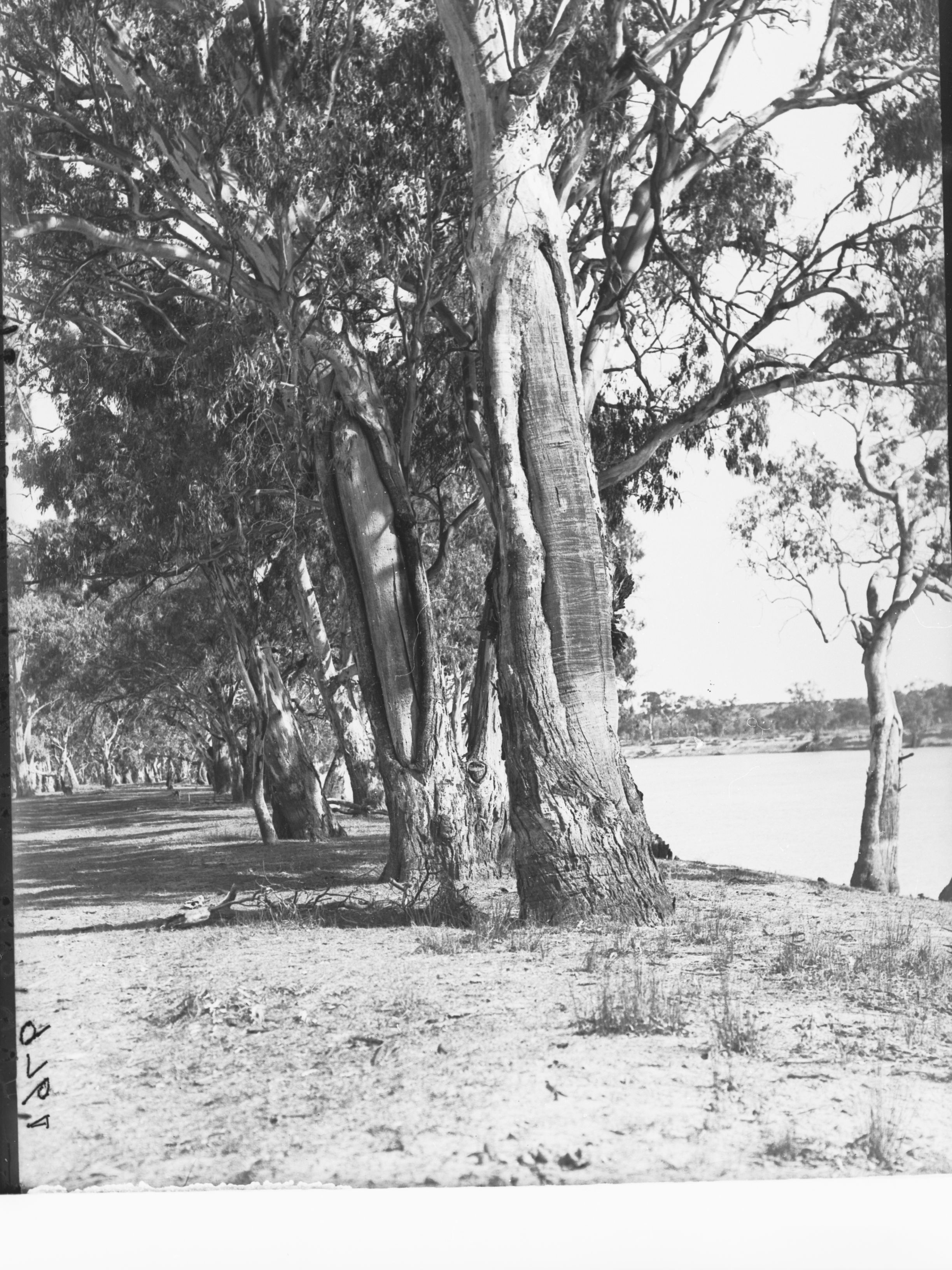
Canoe scarring on trees, Waikerie by the Murray River

A scarred tree or scar tree, also known as a canoe tree and shield tree, is a tree which has had bark removed by Aboriginal Australians for the creation of bark canoes, shelters, weapons such as shields, tools, traps, containers (such as coolamons), or other artefacts. Carved trees may also be created as a form of artistic and spiritual expression by some Aboriginal peoples, to mark sites of significance such as burial sites. Trees in some areas are culturally modified in other ways that change their form, including "trees-in-trees".

== Description ==
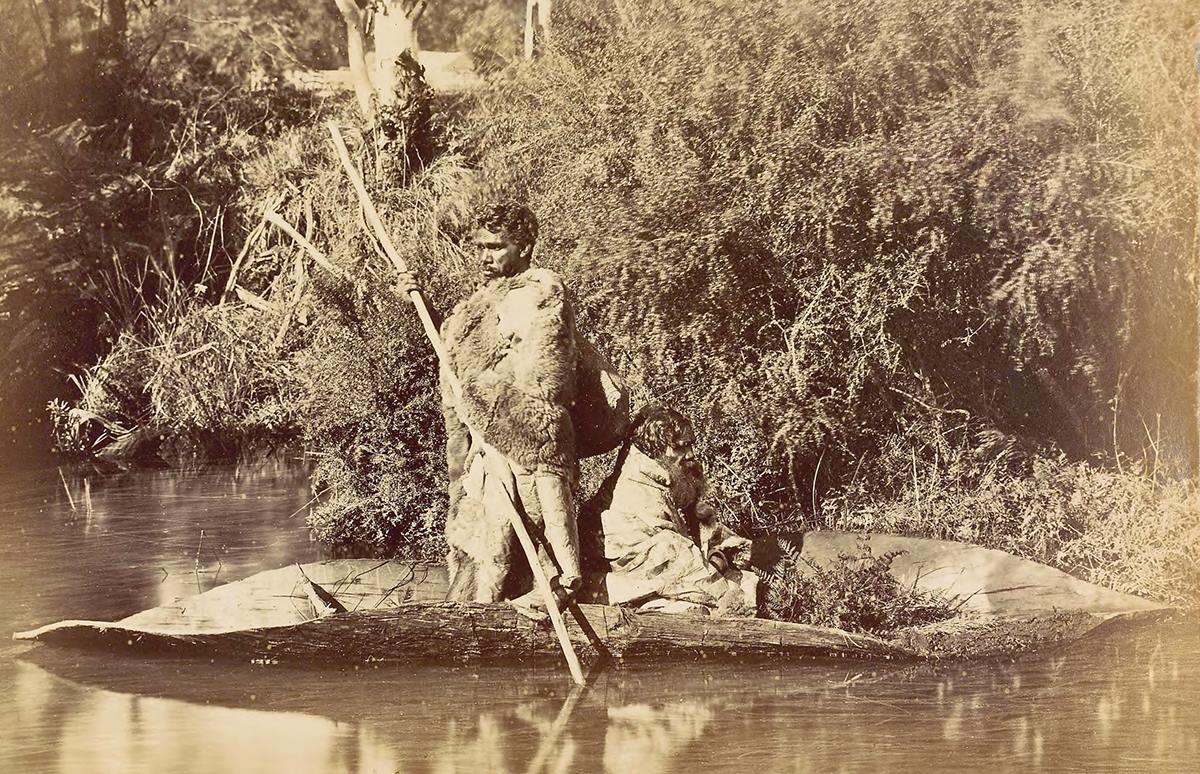
Aboriginal men in a bark canoe, South Australia (c. 1870)

Bark was removed by making deep cuts in a tree with a stone pickaxe or other similar tool. The area of bark removed is typically regular in shape, often with parallel sides and slightly pointed or rounded ends, and the scar usually stops above ground level. Australian native Eucalypt species such as box and red gum (especially in Victoria), swamp mahogany, river box, or whichever species are native in the area. Scars remain in trees that are often over 200 years old. Sometimes there is exposed sapwood at the base or at the top of the scar, showing axe cuts.

Aboriginal people removed bark from trees to make things like canoes, axes, tools, containers and shields, as well as to build temporary shelters. Sometimes they cut toe holds for ease of climbing, with the trees used as lookouts or to hunt for bush foods. Wrapping meat or seafood in layers of moistened paperbark (Melaleuca) and nestling it into the hot coals is one of traditional Aboriginal way of cooking.

Bark canoes were mainly used for fishing or crossing rivers or lakes rather than long journeys. They were usually propelled by punting with a long stick.

To remove bark, the Aboriginal people cut an outline of the shape they wanted using stone axes or, once Europeans had arrived, steel axes. The bark was then levered off. Sometimes the axe marks made by Aboriginal people are still visible on the sapwood of the tree, but usually the marks will be hidden because the bark has grown back. The amount of bark regrowth may indicate the age of the scar. Sometimes, if the scar is very old, it will be completely covered by regrowth.

== Bark canoes ==
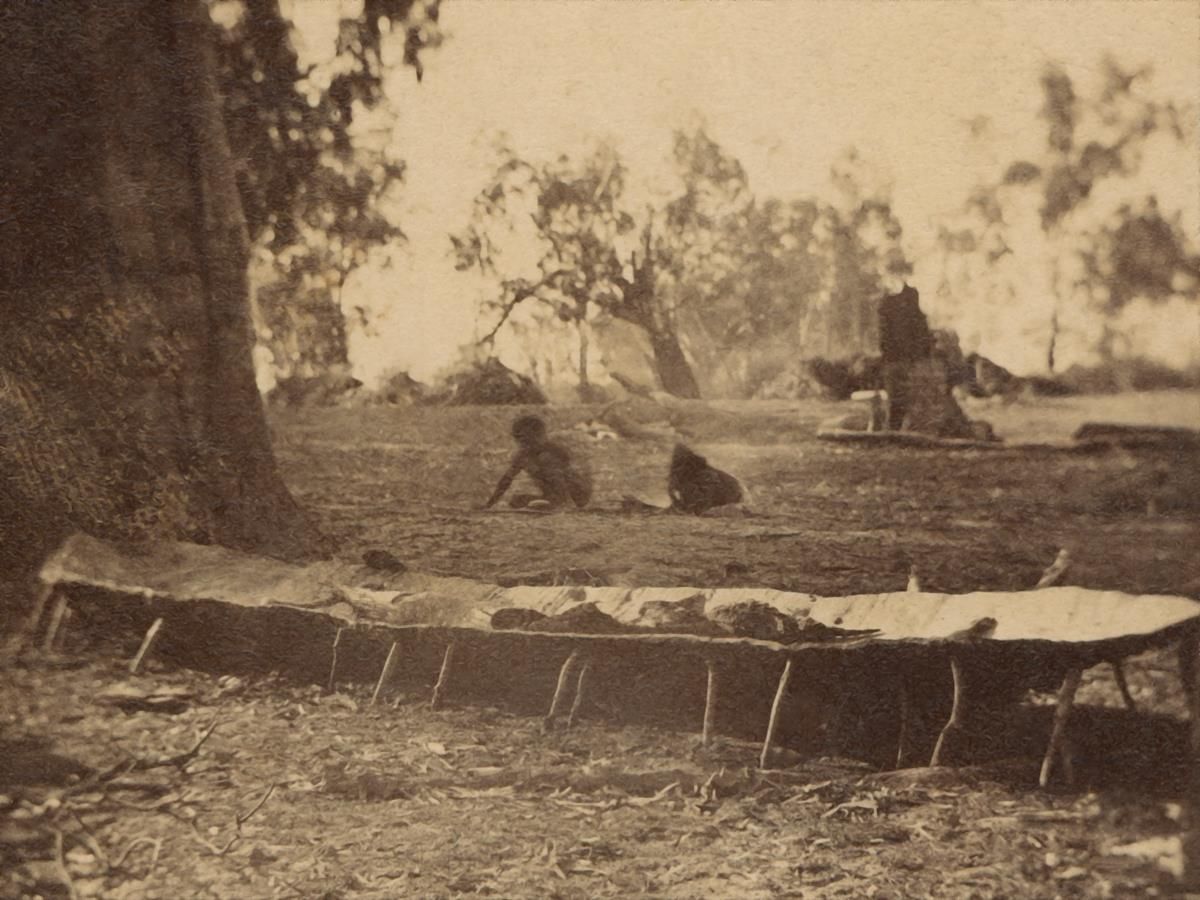
Bark canoe in process of construction, South Australia c. 1862

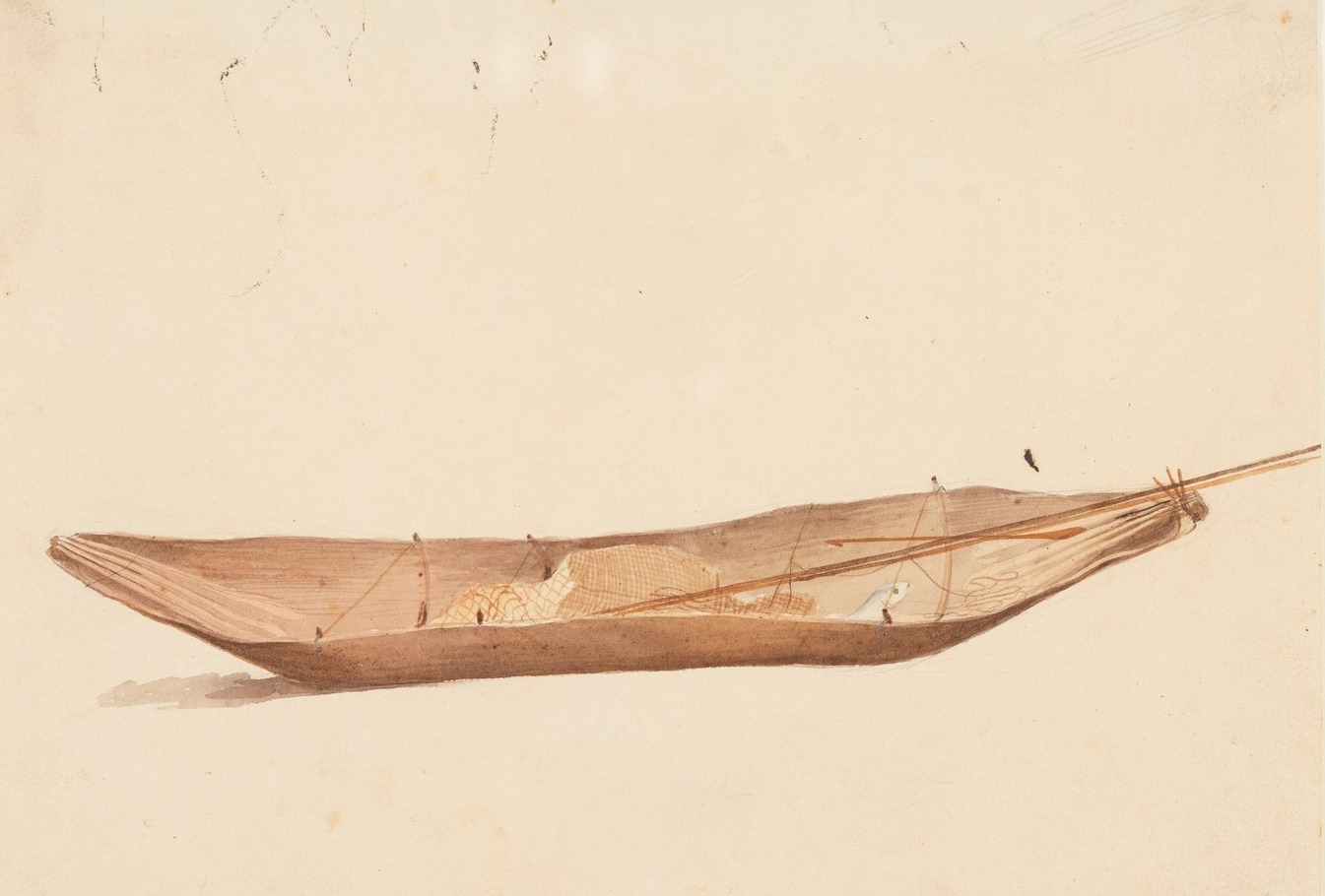
Bark canoe from New South Wales, c. 1842

Aboriginal people made several kinds of bark canoes. Bark canoes were made from the bark of certain trees, notably red gum, stringybark, swamp mahogany and river box and were made during summer.

Bark canoes were made from a single piece of bark. They were softened over fire, tied at both ends to make a canoe shape and used sticks or spars to keep it open. The resin from Xanthorrhoea (grass tree) was used to waterproof the base and were also used to repair any leaks or small holes. This bark canoe is called Nawi. A small fire was kept alight in the bark canoe on a bed of wet clay or seaweed. This kept people warm in the winter and also allowed them to cook the fish they had caught. Yuki is another form of bark canoe, the bark on the tree was cut-out in a shape of a canoe, it was then propped up all round the edge with the help of sticks and weighted in the middle with stones and logs of wood, then a fire is made inside and under the bark to heat the sap and make it pliable and soft. It is then left to dry in the canoe shape. Bark strips could also be sewn together to make larger canoes, known as Gumung derrka and Na-riyarrku or sewn bark canoes.

Non-Indigenous Australians referred to the trees thus marked as scarred trees, scar trees, canoe trees or shield trees.

In the 17th century, dugout canoe technology appeared in northern Australia coastline, to supplement the bark canoe, causing many changes to both the hunting practices and the society of the northern coastline Aboriginal peoples.

== Carved trees ==
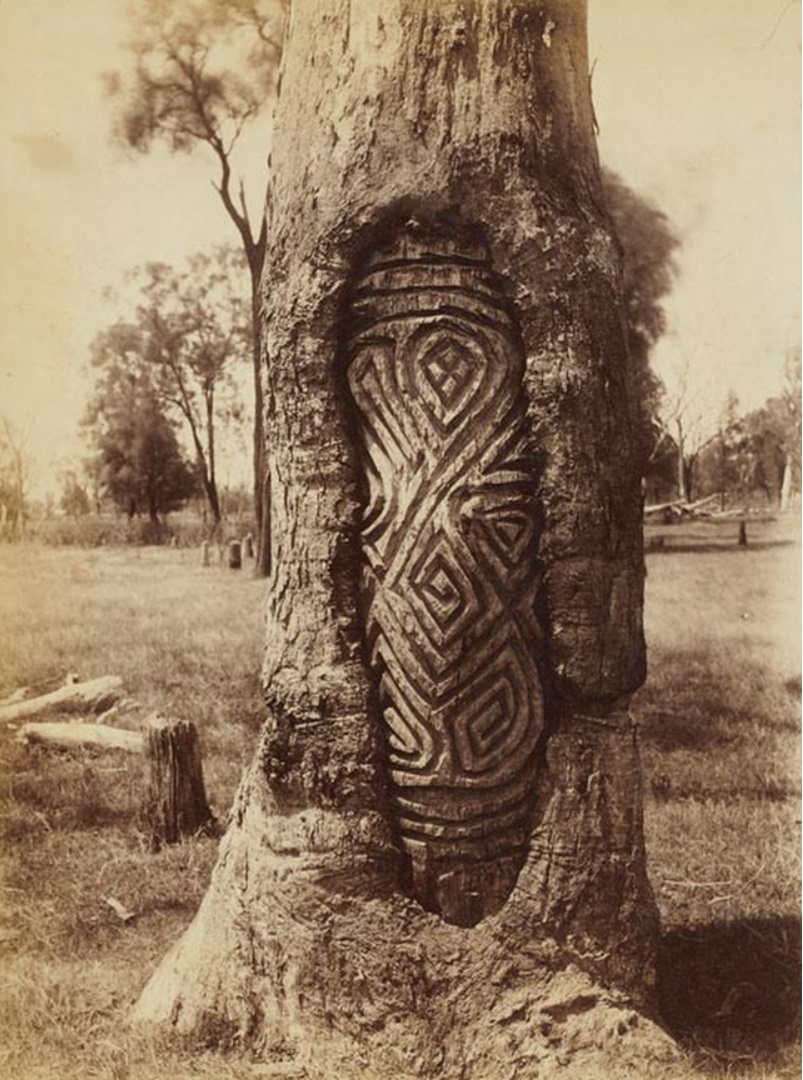
Carved tree in New South Wales, photographed by Henry King c. 1889–1894

Carved trees are known across Australia in various forms. Some of the most remarkable example of carved trees are found in New South Wales, and are the work specifically of Gamilaroi and Wiradjuri peoples. They were created to mark sites of particular ceremonial significance, such as initiation or burial sites. They are also known as arborglyphs, dendroglyphs and teleteglyphs.

In Western Australia, a form of tree carving also occurred in the southwest where trees near the burial sites were sometimes carved. Notches and figures daubed red are known for the Harvey River area. Circles and other carved ornamentations are reported for Perth, circles for the Southwest. Notches are cut on two trees for each grave, an even number of notches for a man, an odd number for a woman, by the tribes from Esperance. In Northwest, trees were carved with figures of emu and kangaroo but an overwhelming majority of the engravings were of snakes, some of which undulated across the tree while others coiled onto themselves. In Queensland, carved trees with zoomorphs and anthropomorphs in a form of snakes, lizards and humans are known.

Many carved trees were destroyed by land clearing, bush fires, farming and natural decay. During the 19th century, sections of these carved trees from New South Wales were removed and placed in museums, but there is now a move not only to return these trees to the land of origin, but also to revive the practice of carved trees.

== Other culturally modified trees ==
In inland northern New South Wales and over the border into Queensland, around 1000 culturally modified trees have been recorded. The term is used to describe trees modified in some way by local Indigenous people, including trees planted within trees ("trees-in-trees"), trees that have been shaped into rings or arrows, or cut out to make bowls to hold water. A group of people including academics and local Indigenous and non-Indigenous people are working to improve knowledge about modified trees, and to bring about both scientific and legislative recognition and protection of trees-in-trees.

== Shields ==
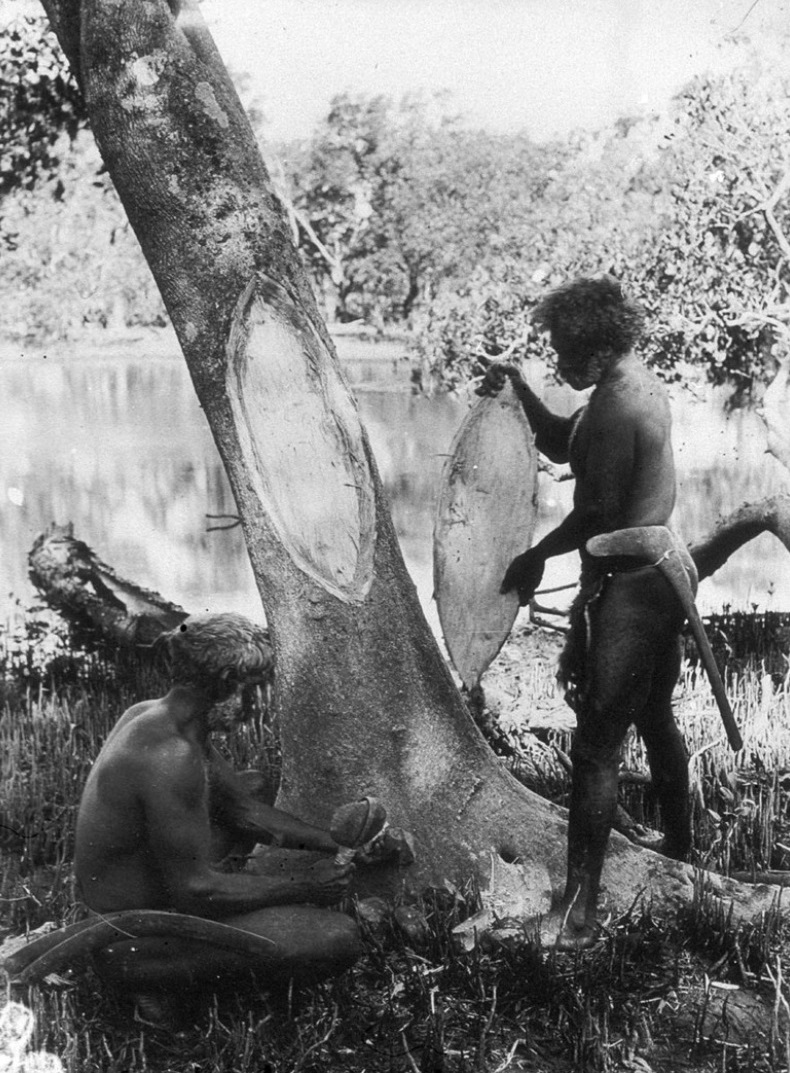
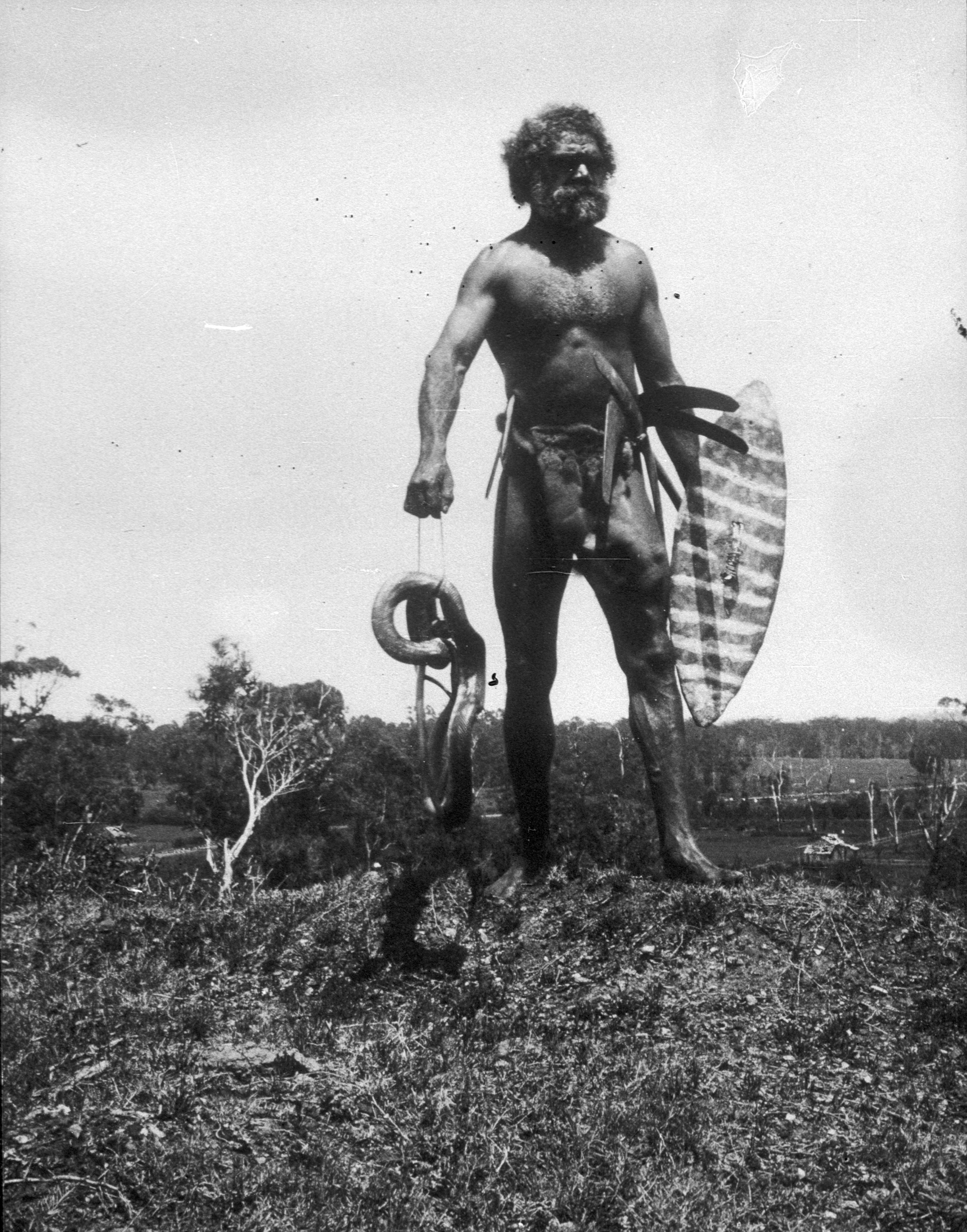
Left: Aboriginal men making bark shields, c. 1905. Right: Bark shield painted with bright colours, c. 1905.

Shields were made from bark or wood and usually had carved markings or painted designs. Shields were mainly used by Aboriginal warriors to defend themselves in dispute battles, often for commodities such as territory. A shield which had not lost a battle was thought to be inherently powerful and was a prized possession. They could also be used in many ceremonial traditions.

Aboriginal shields come in two main types, broad shields, and parrying shields. Parrying shields parry blows from a club whereas broad shields block spears. Shields for parrying are thick, strong and narrow, whereas broad shields are wide but thin. Aboriginal shields were made from different materials in different areas, they were made from buttress root, mulga wood, and bark. A handle is attached or carved on the back and the shield was often painted with red and white patterns. Arragong and Tawarrang shields were carved of wood often with an outer layer of bark. Tawarrang shields were notably narrow and long and had patterns carved into the sides. This particular category of shield could also be used as a musical instrument when struck with a club, in addition to its use as a weapon.

== Locations ==
Scarred trees are found among mature native trees, especially box gum and red gum trees, along rivers and lakes and at sacred sites; in some instances these trees are sacred sites themselves. In many instances they are protected by legislation.

Canoe trees have been photographed along the Murray River at Waikerie and Kroehns Landing at Nildottie in South Australia, and on the Murrumbidgee River near Hay, New South Wales.

Royal Melbourne Institute of Technology in Bundoora, Victoria has six scarred trees on its campus. It has developed a self-guided tour trail, and information can be found on its website.

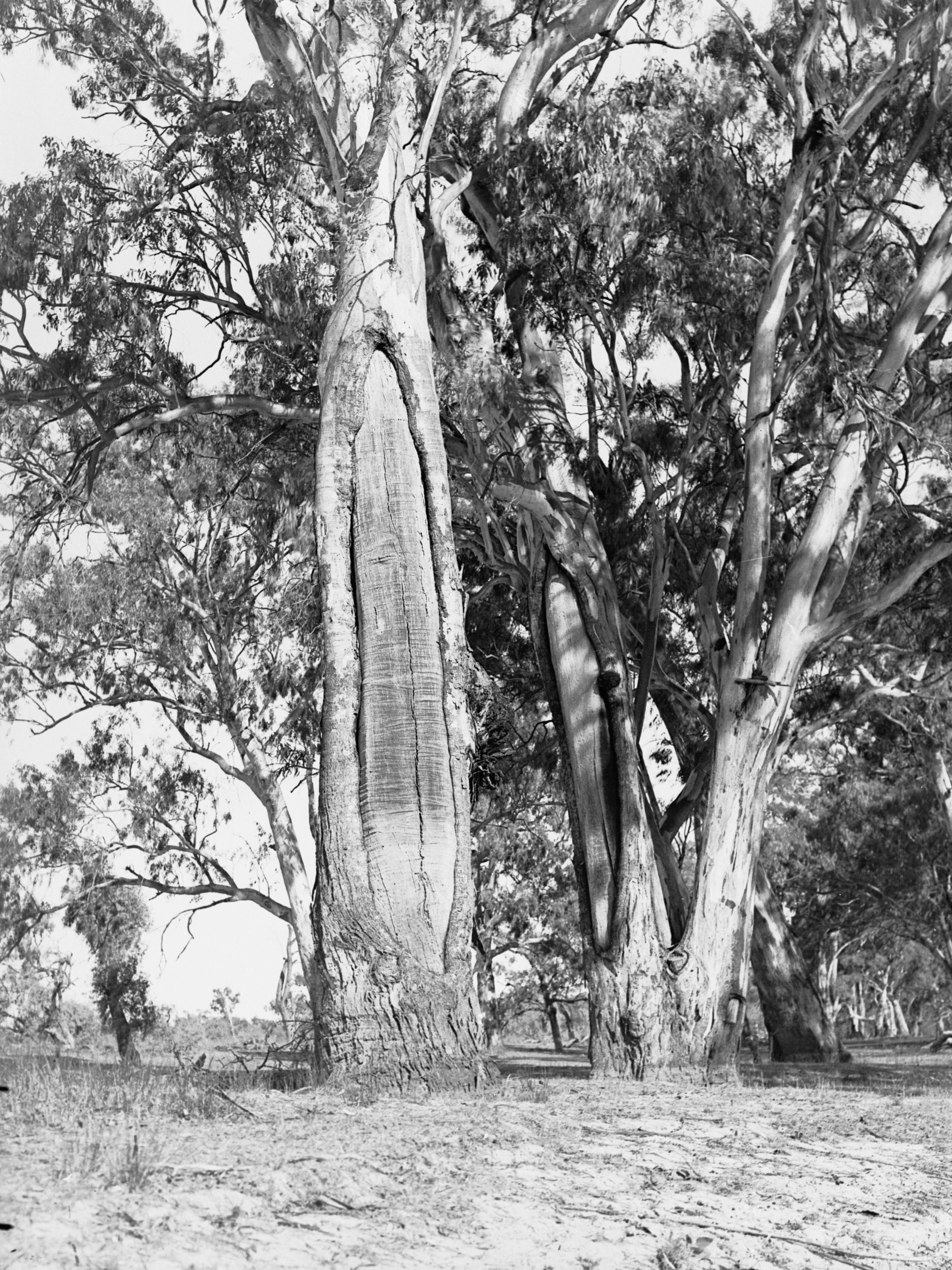
Canoe scarring on a tree at Waikerie on the River Murray

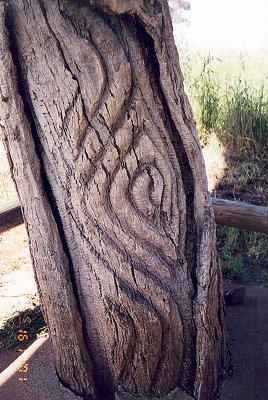
Wiradjuri carved tree, Grave of Yuranigh. c. 1850

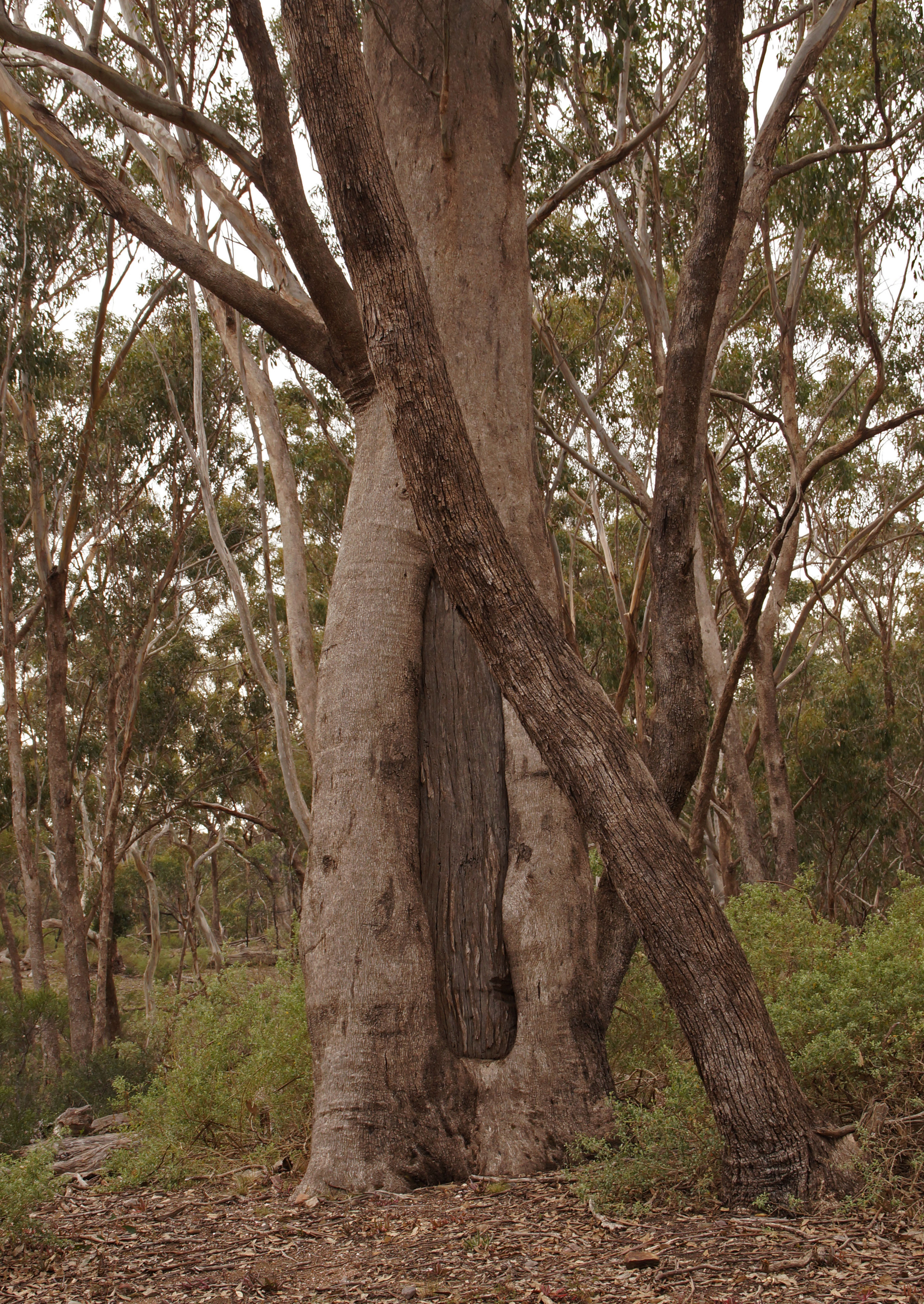
Canoe scarring, Victoria

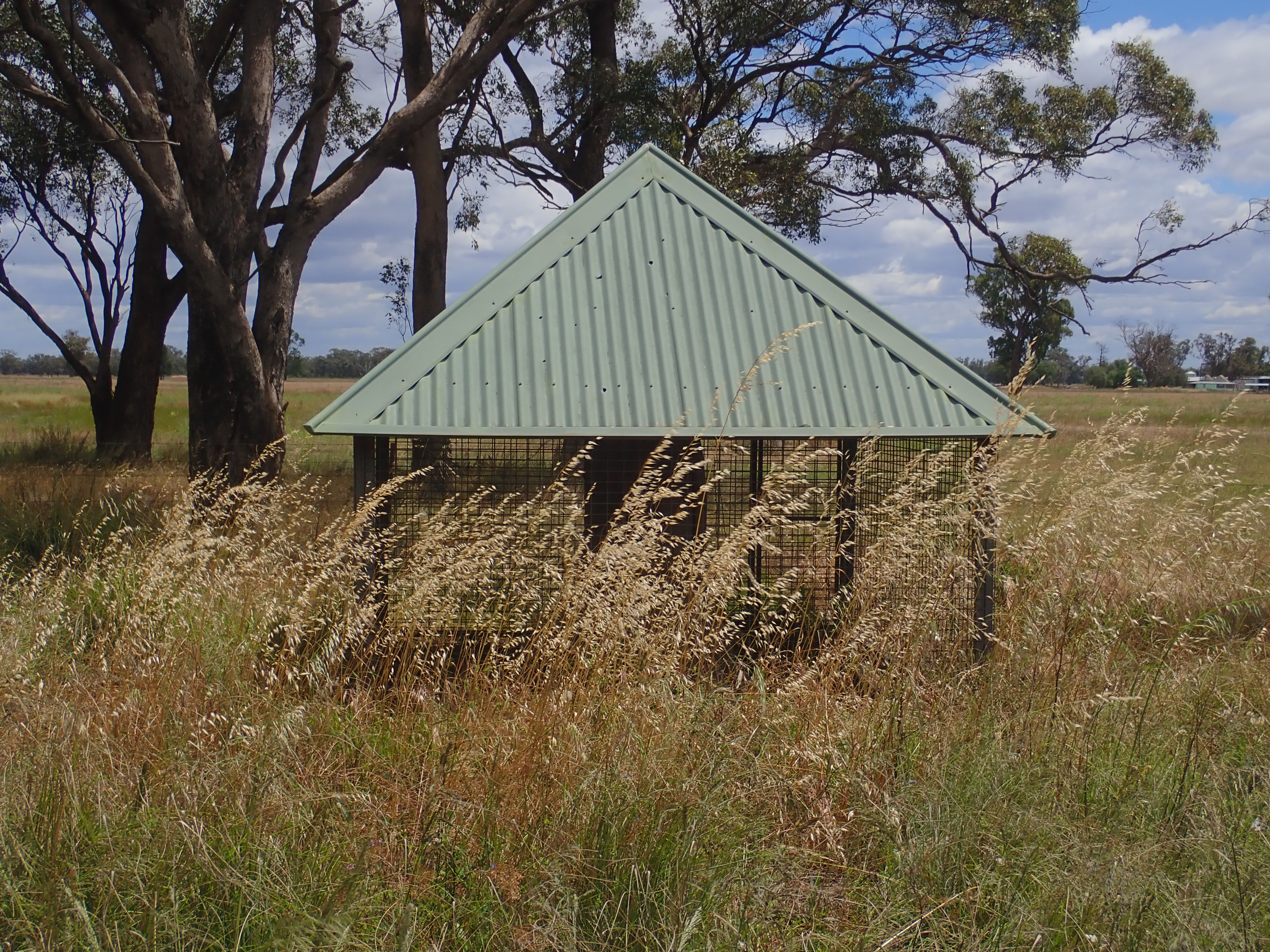
Scar tree stump protected by shelter, Newell Highway, south of Dubbo

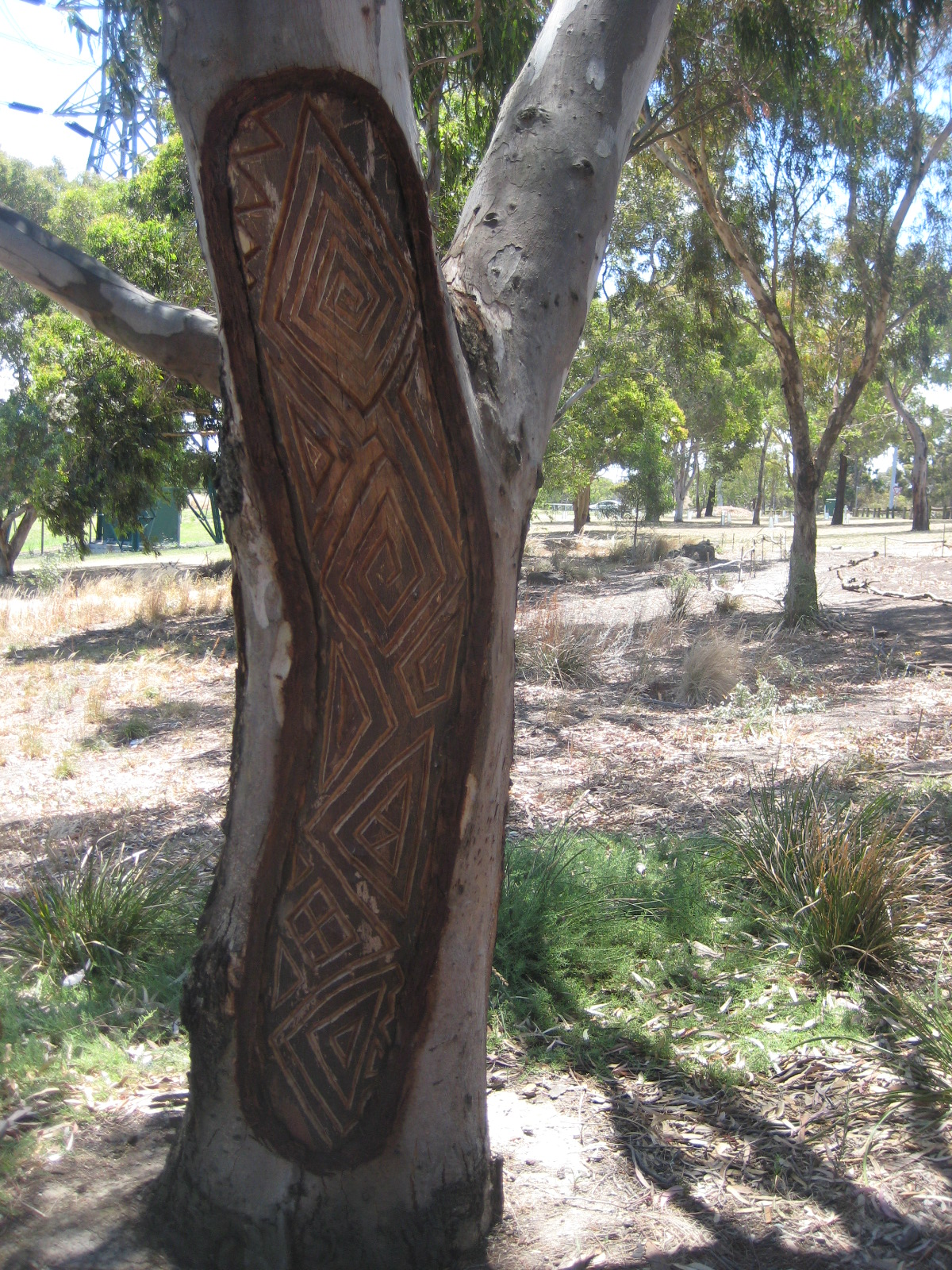
Carved tree created in 2012

== See also ==
- Australian Aboriginal artefacts
- Leaf scar — naturally occurring scar
