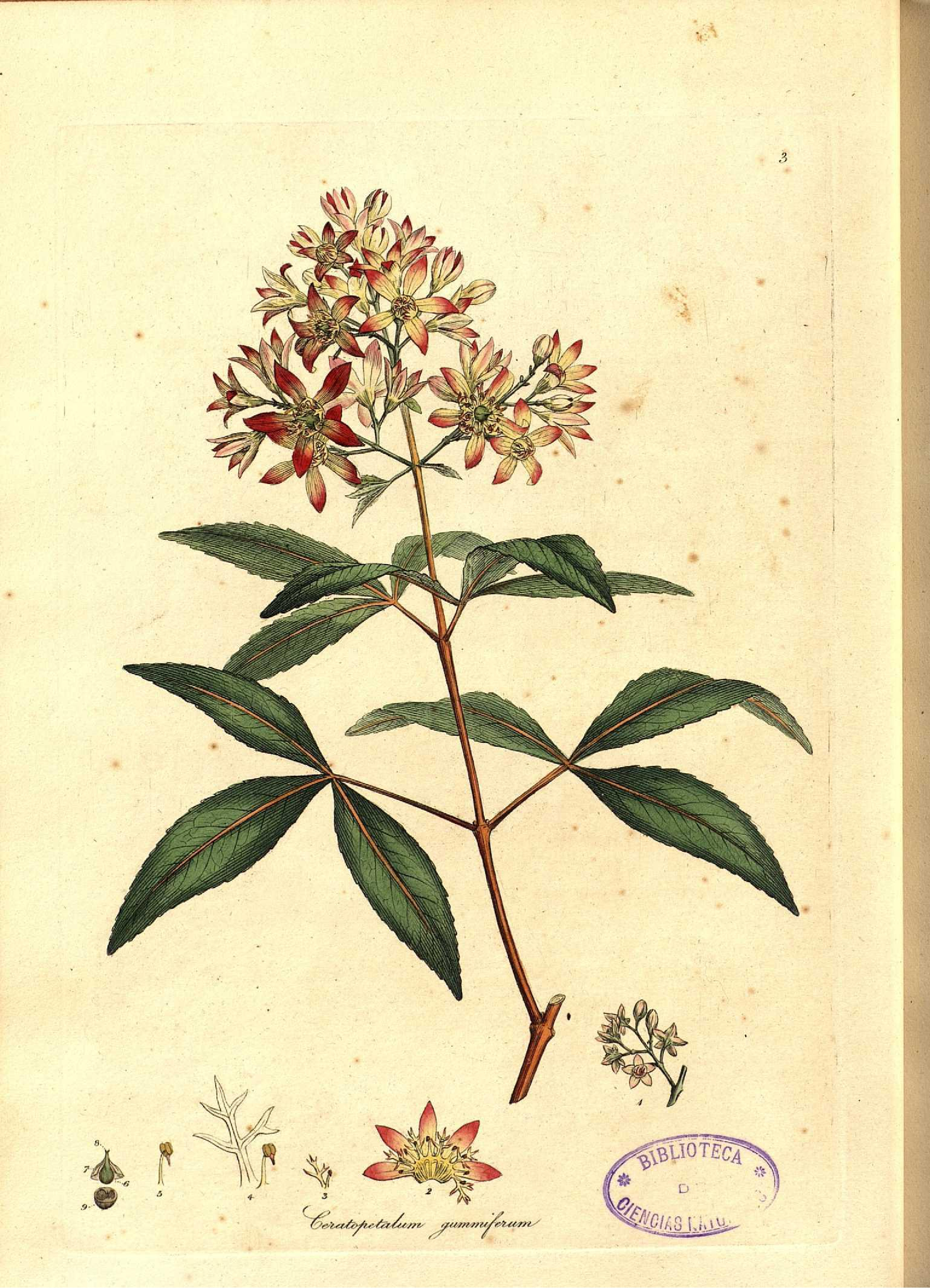
- Ceratopetalum gummiferum showing flowers, foliage and fruit, all typical of the genus.

Scientific classification
- Kingdom: Plantae
- Clade: Tracheophytes
- Clade: Angiosperms
- Clade: Eudicots
- Clade: Rosids
- Order: Oxalidales
- Family: Cunoniaceae
- Genus: Ceratopetalum; Sm.

Species
- See text
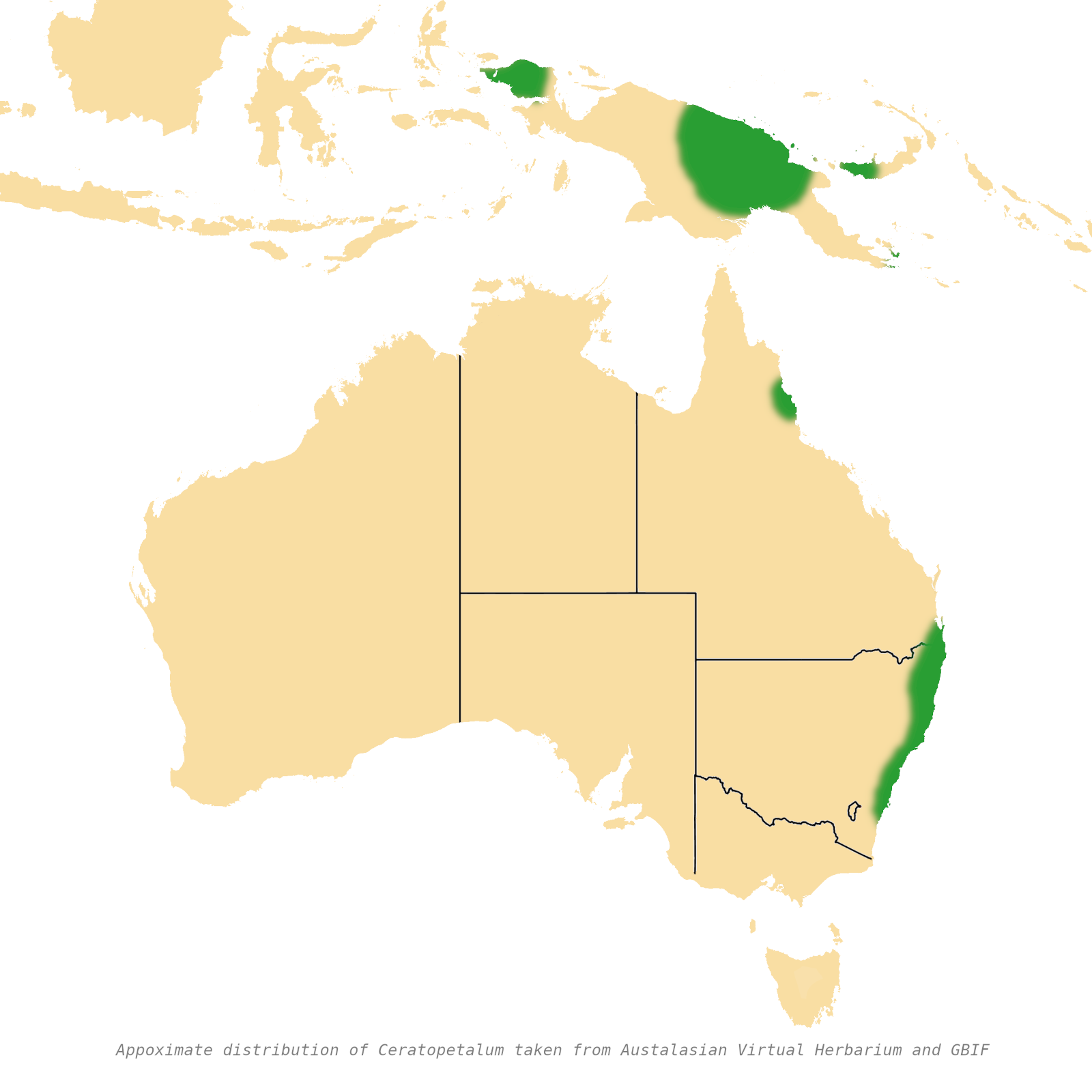

= Ceratopetalum =

Genus of flowering plants

Ceratopetalum is a genus of nine species of plants in the family Cunoniaceae. They are native to eastern Australia (eight species) and New Guinea (one species). They are trees or large shrubs of rainforest or moist sclerophyll forest, some producing useful timber. Fossil records suggest the range of the genus extended to the Americas in the past.

== Description ==
The genus is characterised by leaves that are opposite and decussate; are either simple (undivided) or with three leaflets; have paired interpetiolar stipules; are usually glabrous and without domatia.

The inflorescences are terminal (sometimes axillary) with decussate branching. Flowers have both male and female organs (bisexual); have either four or five sepals; have no petals except for C. gummiferum; have two whorls of stamens, the outer whorl opposite the sepals and the inner whorl between the sepals; have an ovary with two (rarely three) carpels; have an annular nectary disc surrounding the ovary.

The fruit are distinctive for the genus. They are indehiscent and the stamens and sepals both remain with the fruit after it has been shed from the tree. They have been variously labelled by different botanists—as a nut by Adolf Engler, Gwen Harden and others, and as a capsule by Bernard Hyland, and as a samara by William C. Dickison.

== Distribution and habitat ==
Species in this genus are distributed in three disjunct regions. Both C. aptetalum and C. gummiferum are found in eastern New South Wales and southeast Queensland, and C. tetrapterum occurs in New Guinea and the Bismarck Archipelago. The remaining six species are found at altitude in a small part of northeast Queensland. All species grow in rainforest, except C. gummiferum which inhabits wet sclerophyll forest, and C. apetalum which inhabits both forest types.

== Taxonomy ==
The genus Ceratopetalum was established by James Edward Smith in his book A Specimen of the Botany of New Holland, published in 1793, which contained the first description of C. gummiferum.

The genus is placed in the tribe Schizomerieae, alongside the genera Schizomeria, Anodopetalum and Platylophus.

== Speciation in North Queensland ==
Allopatric speciation is a process in which the population of a species is divided permanently by a geographical barrier which prevents the two subpopulations from interbreeding. Each subpopulation then evolves separately and eventually forms a new species. It is believed that this process is responsible for the diversity of species in northeast Queensland. Evidence shows that during the last glacial cycle (18,000 YBP), areas suitable for Certopetalum contracted to mountain peaks where higher rainfall persisted, and it has been suggested that this resulted in the speciation seen today.

== Extant species ==
Nine species are recognised as of May 2026:

- Ceratopetalum apetalum D.Don
- Ceratopetalum corymbosum C.T.White
- Ceratopetalum gummiferum Sm.
- Ceratopetalum hylandii Rozefelds & R.W.Barnes
- Ceratopetalum iugumense Rozefelds & R.W.Barnes
- Ceratopetalum macrophyllum Hoogland
- Ceratopetalum succirubrum C.T.White
- Ceratopetalum tetrapterum Mattf.
- Ceratopetalum virchowii F.Muell.

== Fossil species ==
- †Ceratopetalum edgardoromeroi – Eocene, South America
- †Ceratopetalum maslinensis – Eocene, South Australia
- †Ceratopetalum suciensis – Eocene, North America
- †Ceratopetalum westermannii – Miocene, New South Wales
- †Ceratopetalum wilkinsonii – Eocene, New South Wales

== Gallery ==
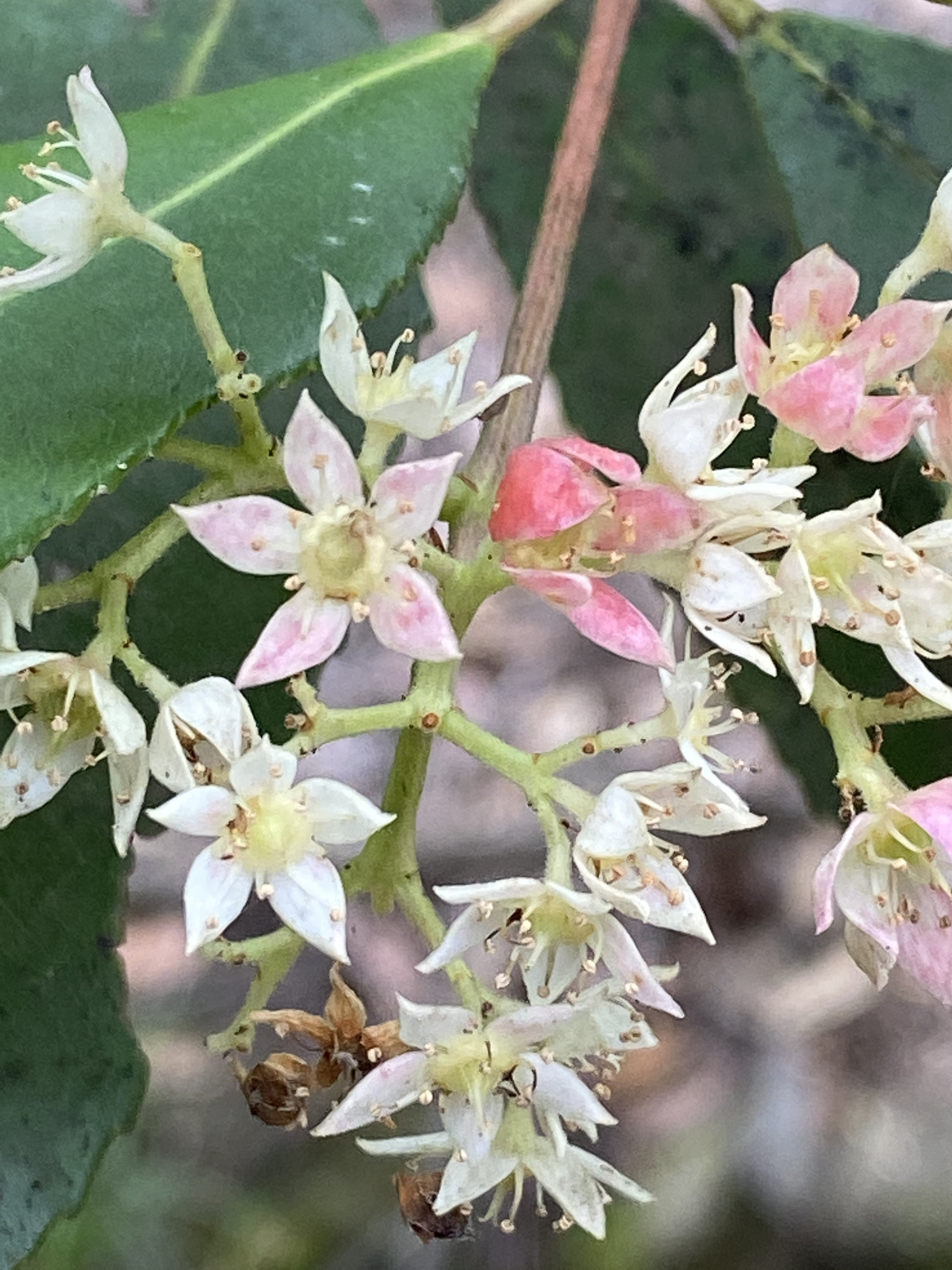
C. apetalum

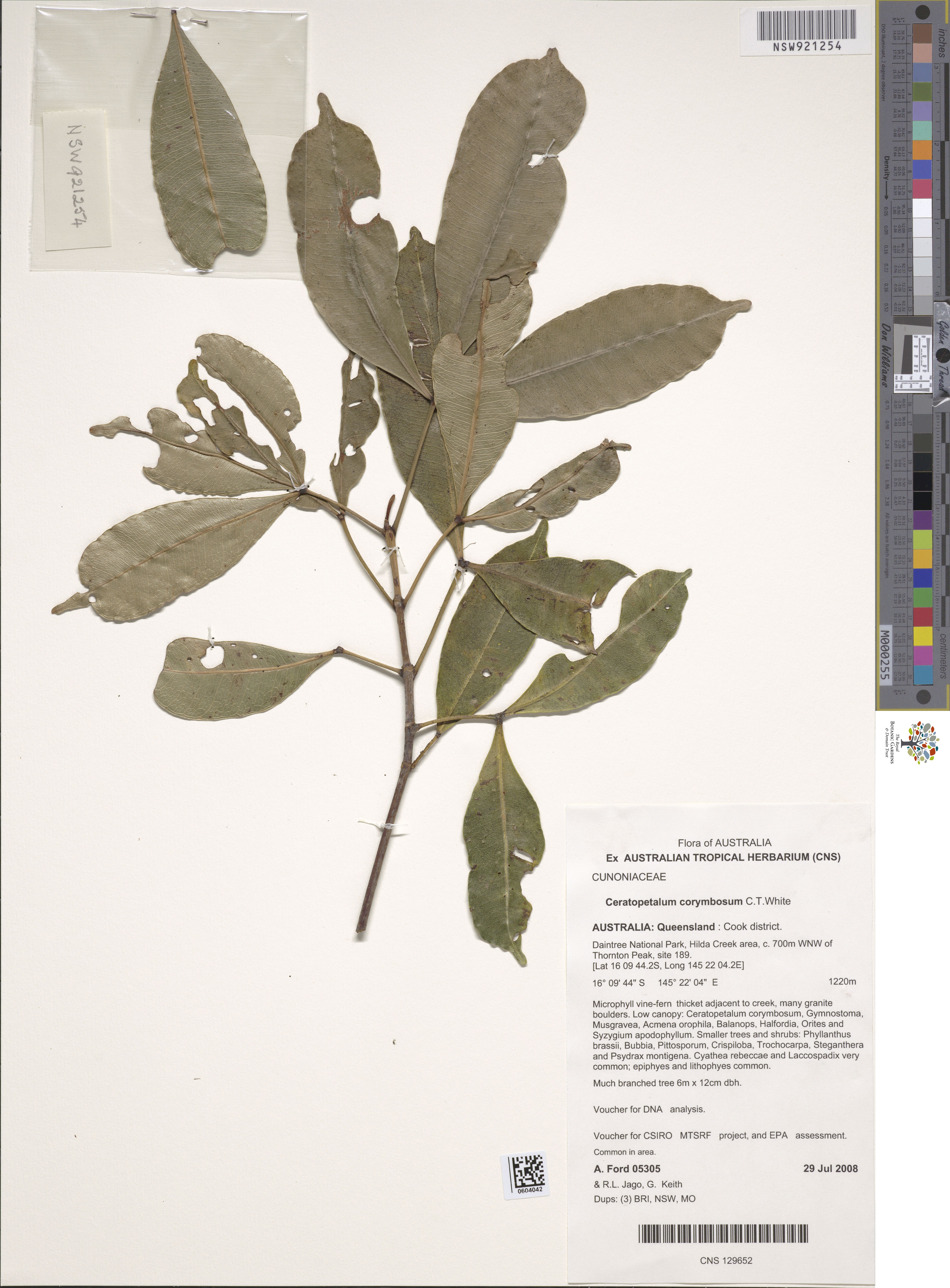
C. corymbosum

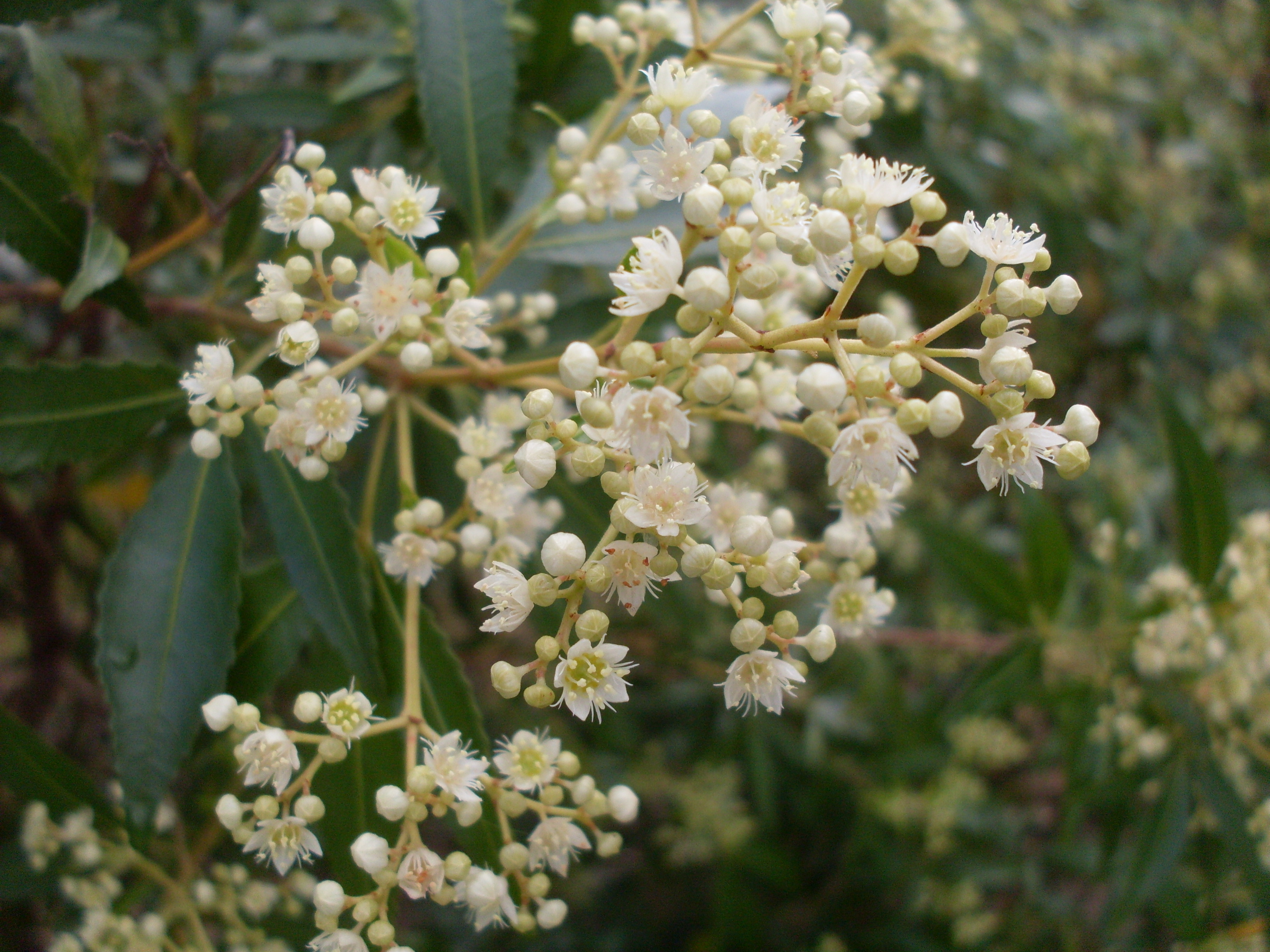
C. gummiferum

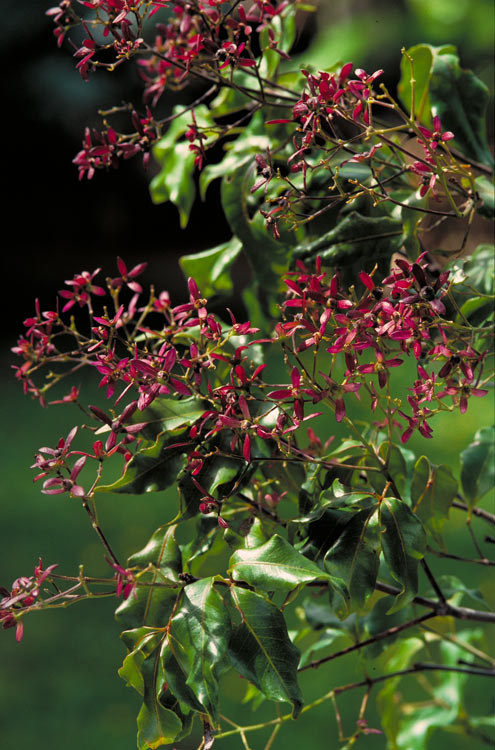
C. hylandii

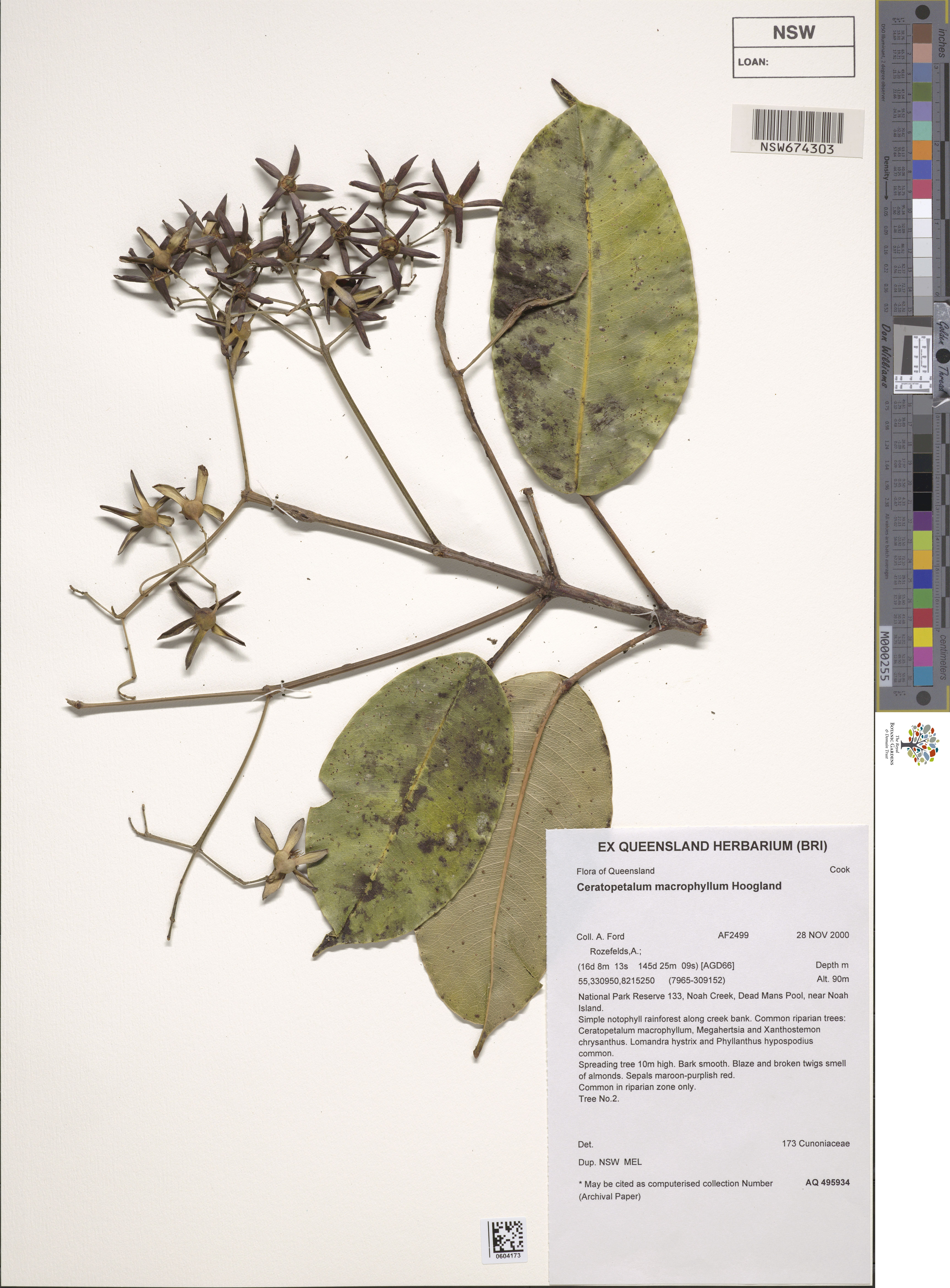
C. macrophyllum

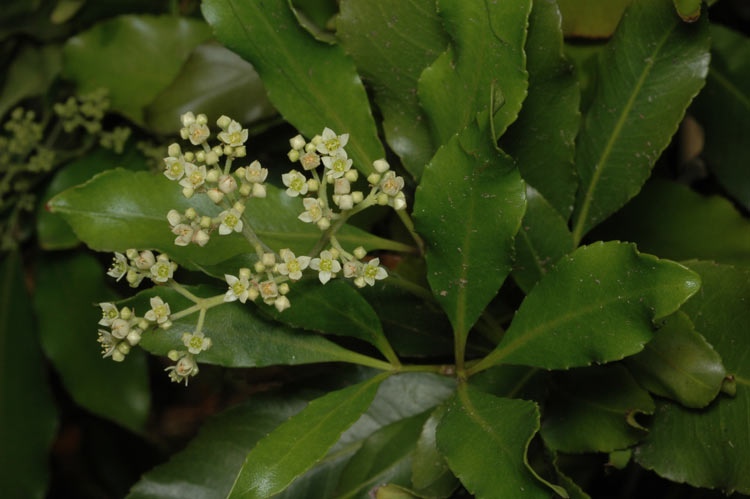
C. succirubrum

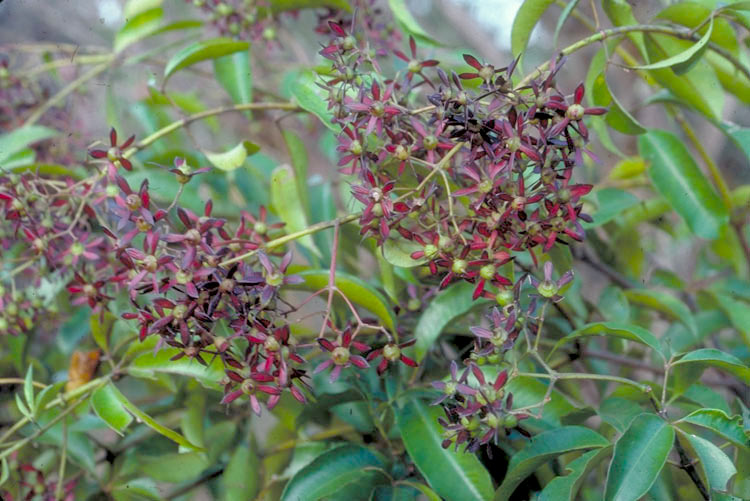
C. virchowii
