= Ceratopetalum tetrapterum =

Scientific classification
- Kingdom: Plantae
- Clade: Tracheophytes
- Clade: Angiosperms
- Clade: Eudicots
- Clade: Rosids
- Order: Oxalidales
- Family: Cunoniaceae
- Genus: Ceratopetalum
- Species: C. tetrapterum

Binomial name
- Ceratopetalum tetrapterum Mattf.

Species of flowering plant

Ceratopetalum tetrapterum is a species of plant in the family Cunoniaceae first described by Johannes Mattfeld in 1939. It is native to New Guinea, including the Bismarck Archipelago.
