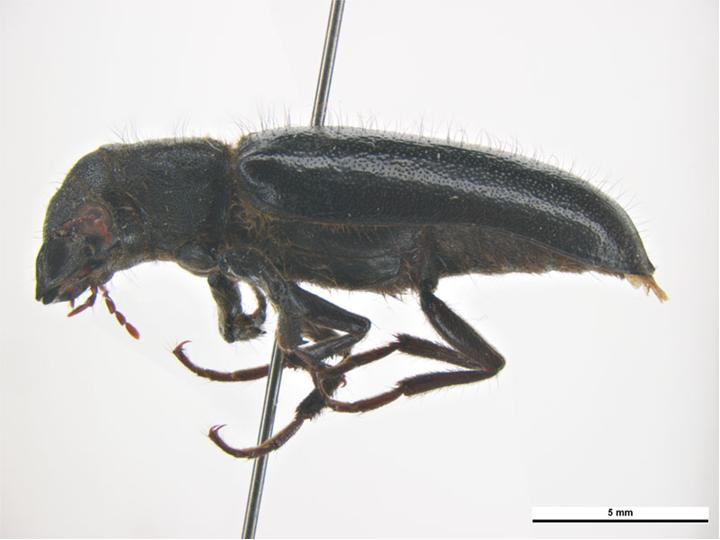
- Polycaon chilensis

Scientific classification
- Domain: Eukaryota
- Kingdom: Animalia
- Phylum: Arthropoda
- Class: Insecta
- Order: Coleoptera
- Suborder: Polyphaga
- Family: Bostrichidae
- Subfamily: Polycaoninae
- Genus: Polycaon; Laporte, 1836

= Polycaon (beetle) =

Genus of beetles

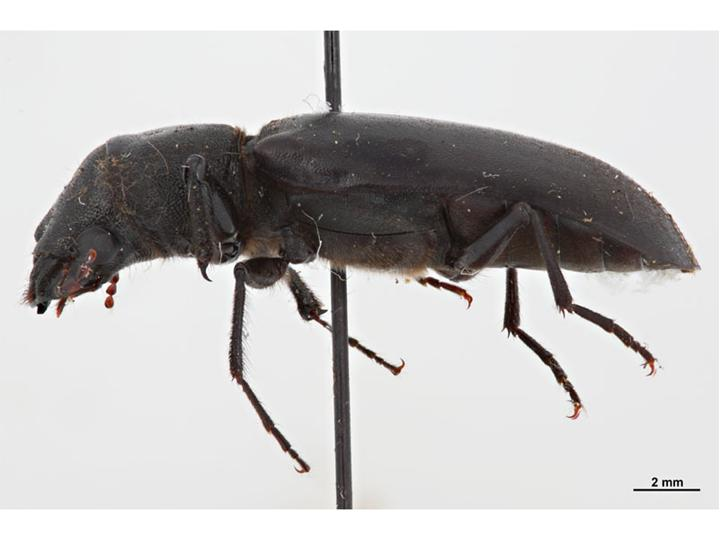
Polycaon stoutii

Polycaon is a genus of horned powder-post beetles in the family Bostrichidae. There are at least four described species in Polycaon.

== Description ==
Beetles in this genus are 10.5-25.5 mm long with flattened bodies. The head is visible from above, instead of being hidden under a hoodlike pronotum like in some other bostrichids. The sides of the pronotum are convex. The tibia of each foreleg has a large, curved spine at its apex and has two terminal spurs inside.

== Species ==
These species belong to the genus Polycaon:

- Polycaon chilensis (Erichson, 1834)^{i c g}
  - Found in South America
- Polycaon granulatus (Van Dyke, 1923)^{i c g}
  - Found in North America
- Polycaon punctatus (LeConte, 1866)^{i c g}
  - Found in Central America
- Polycaon sinensis Liu & Beaver, 2023
  - Found in China
- Polycaon stoutii (LeConte, 1853)^{i c g b} - black polycaon
  - Found in western North America

Data sources: i = ITIS, c = Catalogue of Life, g = GBIF, b = Bugguide.net

== Identification ==
Key to North American species
