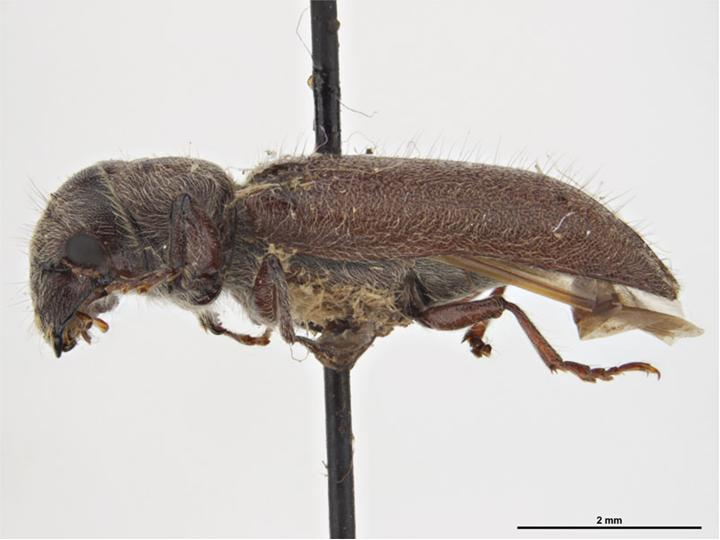

Scientific classification
- Domain: Eukaryota
- Kingdom: Animalia
- Phylum: Arthropoda
- Class: Insecta
- Order: Coleoptera
- Suborder: Polyphaga
- Family: Bostrichidae
- Genus: Melalgus
- Species: M. confertus

Binomial name
- Melalgus confertus (LeConte, 1866)

= Melalgus confertus =

Species of beetle

Melalgus confertus, known generally as the branch and twig borer or grape cane borer, is a species of horned powder-post beetle in the family Bostrichidae. It is found in North America.
