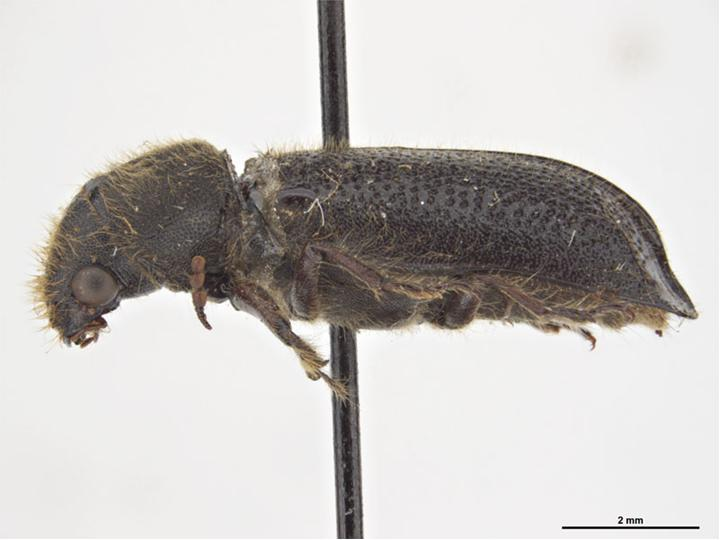
- Melalgus batillus

Scientific classification
- Domain: Eukaryota
- Kingdom: Animalia
- Phylum: Arthropoda
- Class: Insecta
- Order: Coleoptera
- Suborder: Polyphaga
- Family: Bostrichidae
- Subfamily: Polycaoninae; Lesne, 1896

Genera
- Melalgus; Polycaon

= Polycaoninae =

Subfamily of beetles

Polycaoninae is a subfamily of horned powder-post beetles in the family Bostrichidae. There are at least 2 genera and 20 described species in Polycaoninae.
