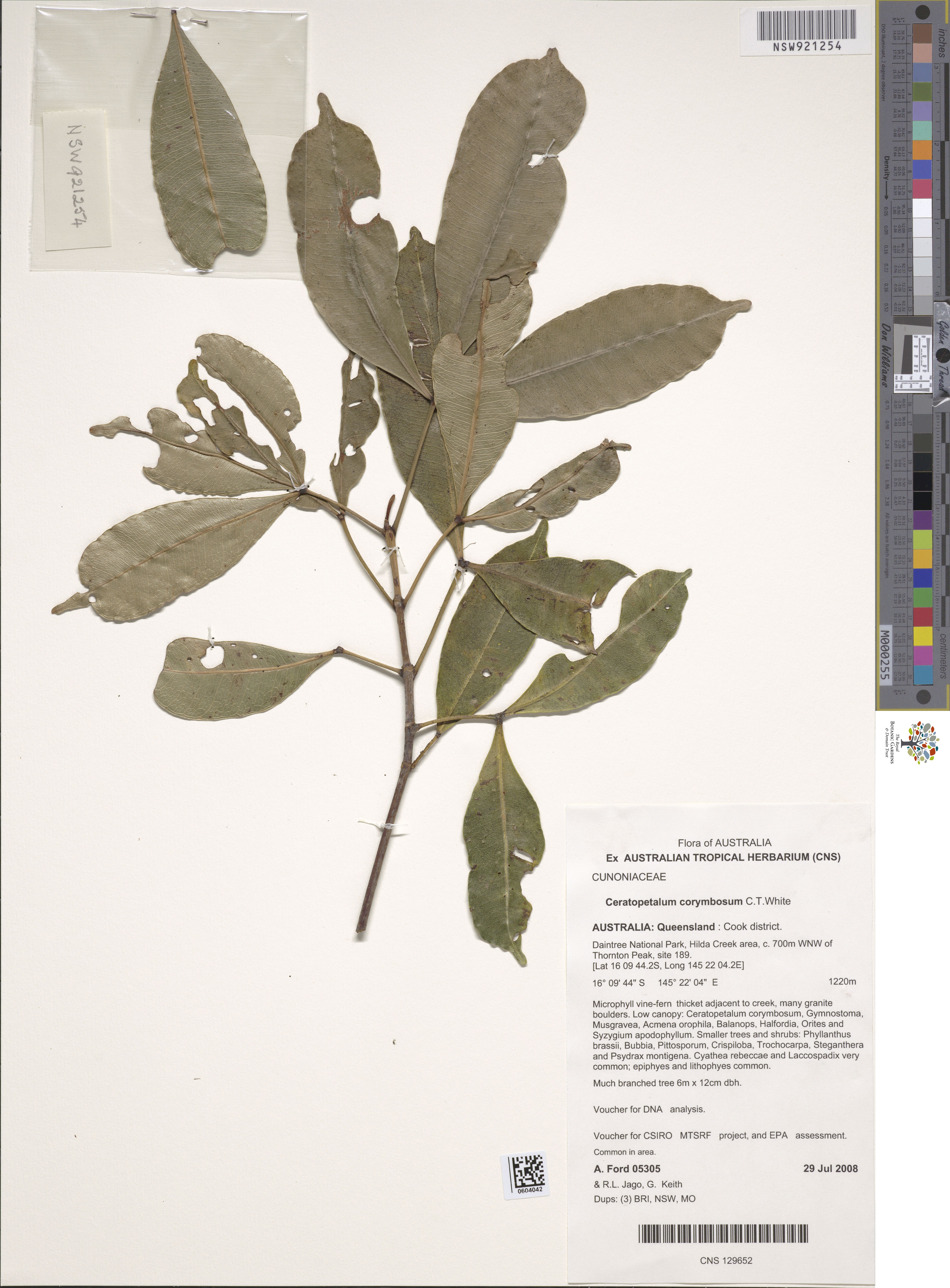
- Herbarium specimen

Conservation status
- Critically Endangered (NCA)

Scientific classification
- Kingdom: Plantae
- Clade: Embryophytes
- Clade: Tracheophytes
- Clade: Angiosperms
- Clade: Eudicots
- Clade: Rosids
- Order: Oxalidales
- Family: Cunoniaceae
- Genus: Ceratopetalum
- Species: C. corymbosum

Binomial name
- Ceratopetalum corymbosum C.T.White

= Ceratopetalum corymbosum =

Species of flowering plant

Ceratopetalum corymbosum, commonly known as mountain sycamore, is a species of plant in the family Cunoniaceae. It is endemic to a very small part of the Wet Tropics bioregion of Queensland, Australia and has been given the conservation status of critically endangered.

== Description ==
Ceratopetalum corymbosum is a small tree with trifoliate leaves arranged in opposite pairs, and stipules about 10 mm (0.39 in) long. The leaflets are stiff and sessile, measuring up to 8 cm (3.1 in) long and 3 cm (1.2 in) wide. The inflorescences take the form of a corymb and are terminal, i.e. they grow from the ends of the twigs. The flowers are fragrant, the calyx tube is about 2 mm (0.08 in) diameter and the tepals about 5 mm (0.2 in) long. The fruit is about 15 mm (0.6 in) long and five-winged.

== Taxonomy ==
It was first described in 1942 by Cyril Tenison White, based on material collected by Hugo Flecker from Thornton Peak. It is most closely related to Ceratopetalum iugumensis and Ceratopetalum macrophyllum.

== Distribution and habitat ==
Ceratopetalum corymbosum is restricted to the area between the Daintree River and Cape Tribulation, mostly at around 1,200–1,300 m (3,900–4,300 ft) altitude on Thornton Peak. It grows in stunted rainforest.

== Conservation ==
This species has been assessed as having the conservation status of critically endangered by the Queensland Government under its Nature Conservation Act. As of May 2026, it has not been assessed by the International Union for Conservation of Nature.
