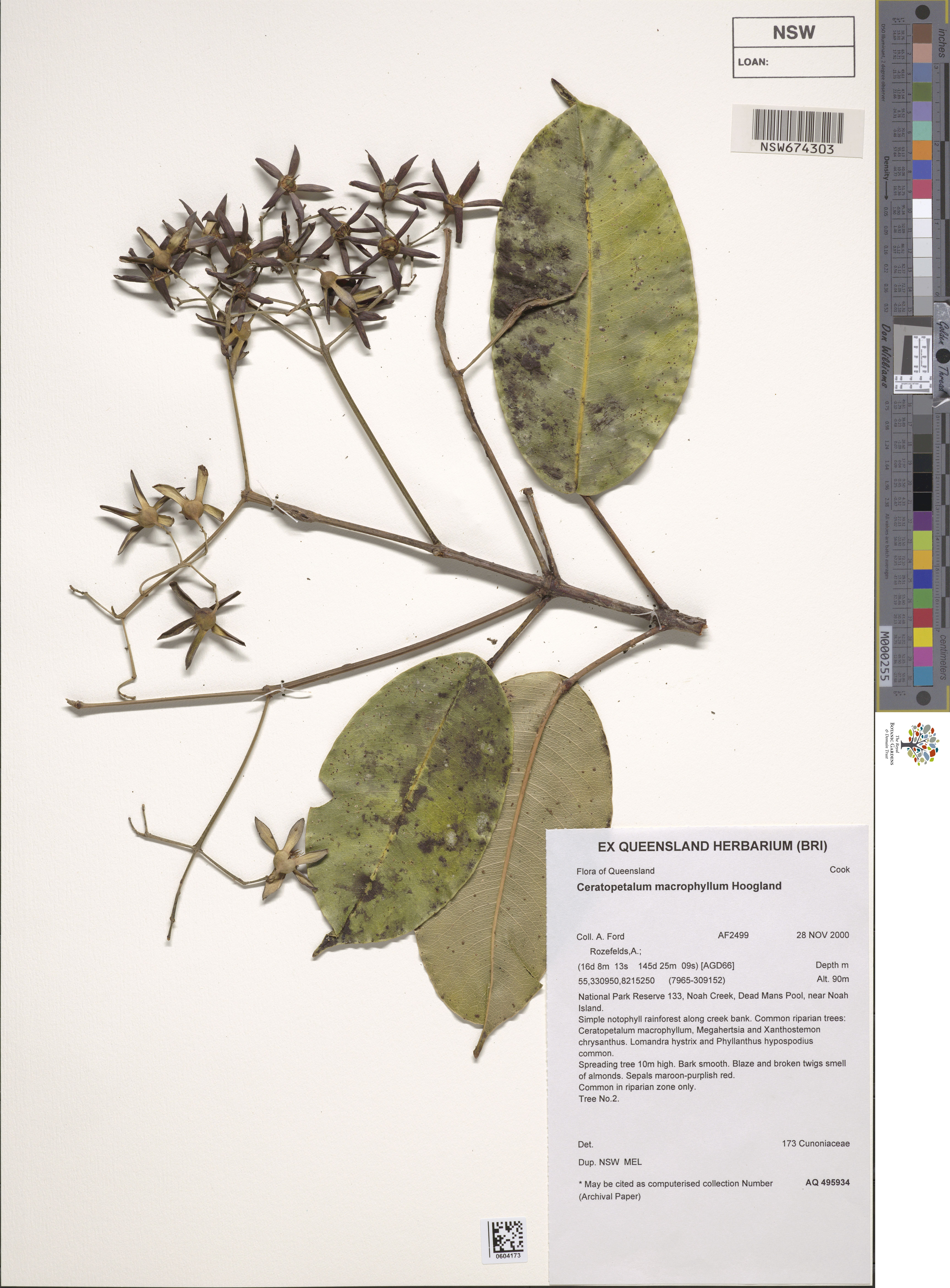

Conservation status
- Near Threatened (NCA)

Scientific classification
- Kingdom: Plantae
- Clade: Tracheophytes
- Clade: Angiosperms
- Clade: Eudicots
- Clade: Rosids
- Order: Oxalidales
- Family: Cunoniaceae
- Genus: Ceratopetalum
- Species: C. macrophyllum

Binomial name
- Ceratopetalum macrophyllum Hoogland
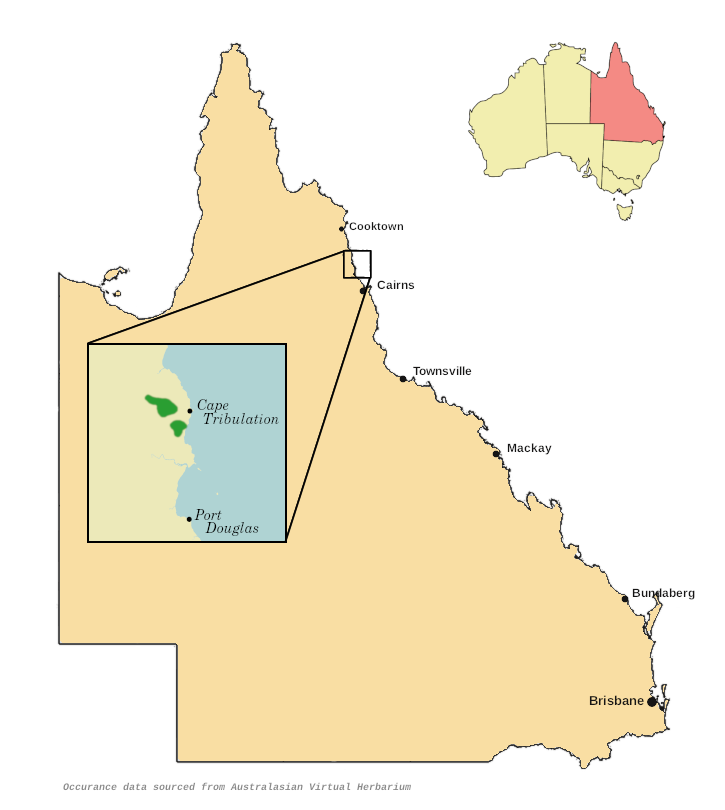

= Ceratopetalum macrophyllum =

Species of flowering plant

Ceratopetalum macrophyllum is a species of plant in the family Cunoniaceae, native to a small area of northeast Queensland, Australia. It is a rainforest tree, first described in 1981, with a conservation status of near-threatened.

== Description ==
This is a tree with a trunk reaching up to 70 cm (28 in) diameter, with conspicuous lenticels about 1 cm (0.39 in) diameter. Leaves are simple, up to 16 cm (6.3 in) long and 7 cm (2.8 in) wide, with 20 – 30 lateral veins on either side of the midrib. They are glabrous and have entire margins. The petiole (leaf stalk) is up to 7 cm (2.8 in) long and swollen at its junction with the leaf blade, and the stipules are about 15 mm (0.6 in) long, 4 mm (0.16 in) wide at the base and rounded at the tip, and they fall when the leaf is fully grown. Inflorescences are either terminal or axillary, the flowers have five sepals but no petals.

== Distribution and habitat ==
The species is highly restricted in range – it is only found in the catchments of Noah Creek and Roaring Meg Creek, north of the Daintree River, at altitudes between sea level and 600 m (2,000 ft).

== Conservation status ==
This species is listed as near-threatened under the Queensland Government's Nature Conservation Act. As of May 2026, it has not been assessed by the International Union for Conservation of Nature.
