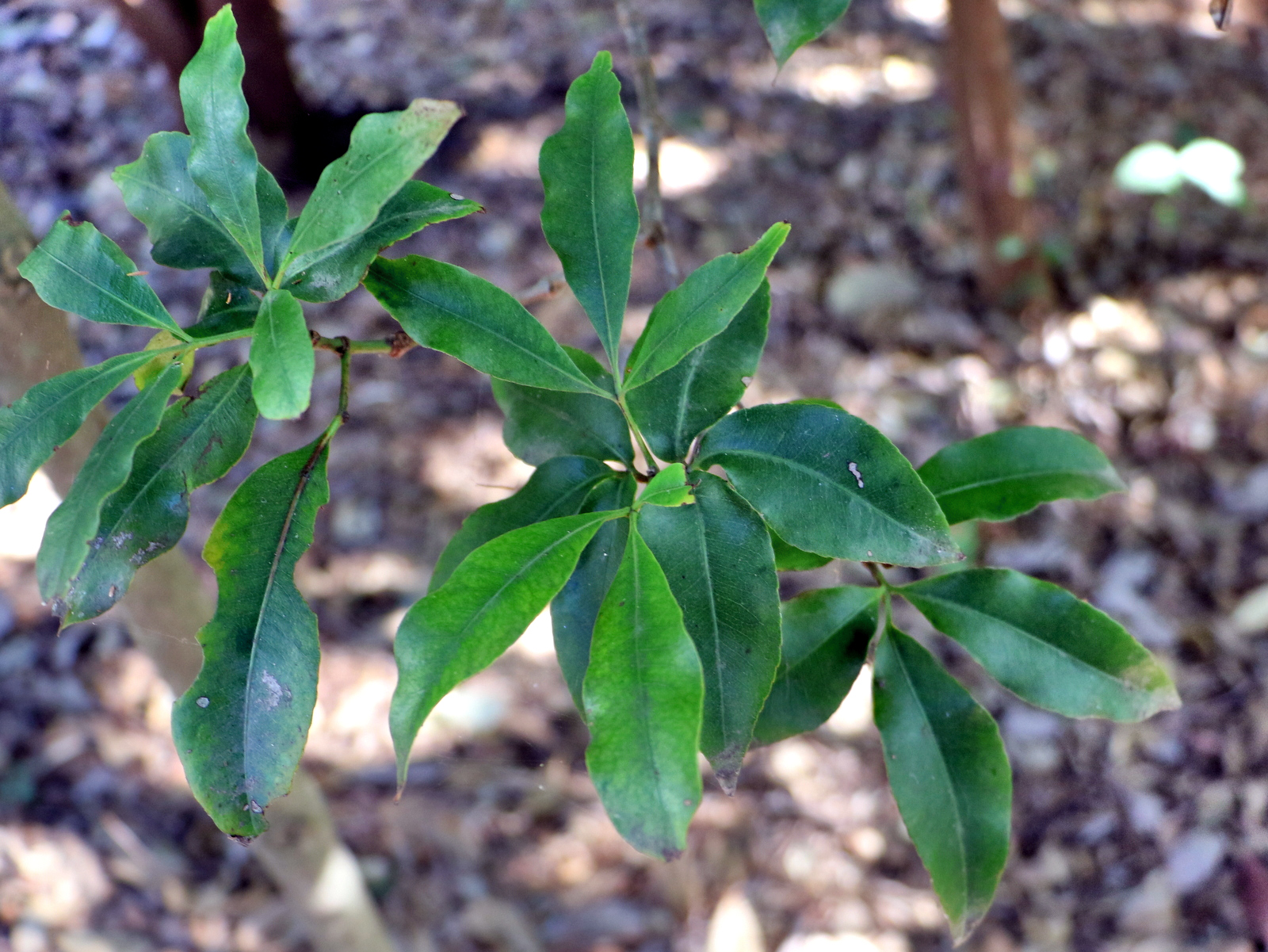

Conservation status
- Least Concern (IUCN 3.1)

Scientific classification
- Kingdom: Plantae
- Clade: Embryophytes
- Clade: Tracheophytes
- Clade: Angiosperms
- Clade: Eudicots
- Clade: Rosids
- Order: Oxalidales
- Family: Cunoniaceae
- Genus: Ceratopetalum
- Species: C. succirubrum

Binomial name
- Ceratopetalum succirubrum C.T.White

Synonyms
- Ceratopetalum tetrapterum Mattf.

= Ceratopetalum succirubrum =

Species of flowering plant

Ceratopetalum succirubrum is a species of plant in the family Cunoniaceae. It is found in Australia, West Papua (Indonesia), and Papua New Guinea. It is threatened by habitat loss. First collected by botanists at Gadgarra on the Atherton Tableland.

Ceratopetalum succirubrum is also known as satin sycamore, blood-in-the-bark and North Queensland coachwood.
