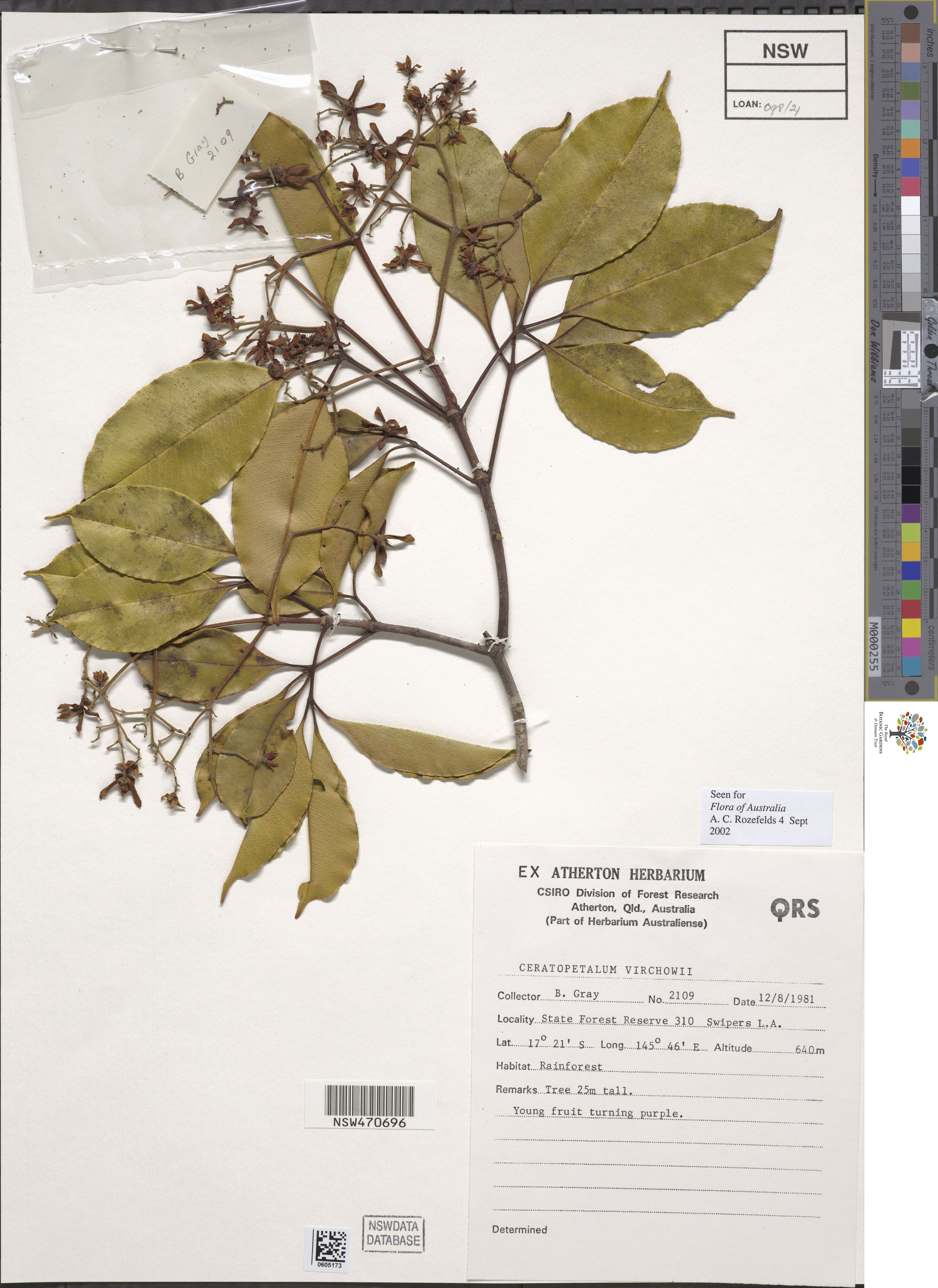
- Herbarium specimen

Conservation status
- Least Concern (IUCN 3.1)

Scientific classification
- Kingdom: Plantae
- Clade: Tracheophytes
- Clade: Angiosperms
- Clade: Eudicots
- Clade: Rosids
- Order: Oxalidales
- Family: Cunoniaceae
- Genus: Ceratopetalum
- Species: C. virchowii

Binomial name
- Ceratopetalum virchowii F.Muell.

= Ceratopetalum virchowii =

Species of flowering plant

Ceratopetalum virchowii, commonly known as pink sycamore or dogwood, is a species of plant in the family Cunoniaceae. It is a rainforest tree, native to the Wet Tropics bioregion of Queensland, Australia. It is named after Rudolf Virchow.

== Description ==
Ceratopetalum virchowii is a tree with conspicuous lenticels on the trunk. The leaves are normally trifoliate (i.e. with three leaflets), and the leaflets can reach 10 cm (4 in) long and 3.5 cm (1.4 in) wide. The flowers have tepals about 4 mm (0.16 in) long and the anthers are black. The fruit is a five-winged capsule about 25 mm (1 in) in diameter.

== Distribution and habitat ==
It grows in rainforest on Mount Bartle Frere, the Bellenden Ker Range and the eastern edge of the Atherton Tableland up to 1,500 m (4,900 ft) elevation.

== Conservation ==
As of May 2026, this species has been assessed to be of least concern by the International Union for Conservation of Nature (IUCN) and by the Queensland Government under its Nature Conservation Act.
