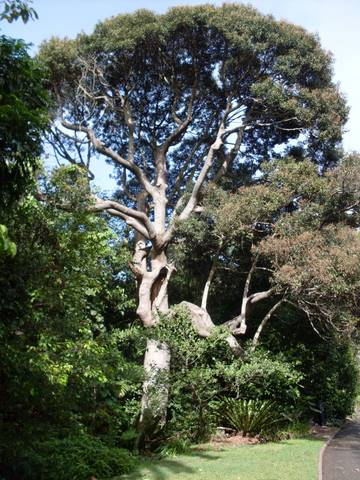
- At the Royal Botanic Garden, Sydney

Conservation status
- Least Concern (IUCN 3.1)

Scientific classification
- Kingdom: Plantae
- Clade: Tracheophytes
- Clade: Angiosperms
- Clade: Magnoliids
- Order: Laurales
- Family: Lauraceae
- Genus: Cryptocarya
- Species: C. obovata

Binomial name
- Cryptocarya obovata R.Br.

= Cryptocarya obovata =

Species of tree

Cryptocarya obovata, commonly known as pepperberry, white walnut, long tom, she beech or purple laurel, is a species of flowering plant in the laurel family and is endemic to eastern Australia. It is a rainforest tree with oblong to egg-shaped leaves, the flowers creamy-green, tube-shaped and unpleasantly perfumed, and the fruit a spherical drupe with white or cream-coloured cotyledons.

== Description ==
Cryptocarya obovata is a tree that typically grows to a height of up to 40 m (130 ft) with a dbh of 90 cm (35 in), its stems sometimes buttressed. The leaves are oblong to egg-shaped with the narrower end towards the base, 50–105 mm (2.0–4.1 in) long, 20–40 mm (0.79–1.57 in) wide and usually glaucous. The hairy underside of the leaves gives the tree a rusty appearance when viewed from below. The leaf veins are brownish-orange or yellow and prominent with the midrib and lateral veins covered with brown hairs.

The flowers are creamy-green and unpleasantly perfumed, arranged in panicles shorter than the leaves. The perianth tube is 1.0–1.6 mm (0.039–0.063 in) long and 1.4–1.7 mm (0.055–0.067 in) wide and softly-hairy on the inside. The outer tepals are 1.8–2.0 mm (0.071–0.079 in) long and 0.9–1.3 mm (0.035–0.051 in) wide, the inner tepals 1.7–2.0 mm (0.067–0.079 in) long and 1.2–1.5 mm (0.047–0.059 in) wide. The ovary is 1.0–1.1 mm (0.039–0.043 in) long and 0.4–0.5 mm (0.016–0.020 in) wide and usually covered with soft hairs. Flowering occurs from January to May, and the fruit is a spherical black drupe, about 12 mm (0.47 in) long and 11–13 mm (0.43–0.51 in) wide, with white or cream-coloured cotyledons.

== Taxonomy ==
Cryptocarya obovata was first formally described in 1810 by Robert Brown in his book, Prodromus Florae Novae Hollandiae. The specific epithet (obovata) means 'inverted egg-shape'.

== Distribution and habitat ==
Pepperberry grows on basaltic and fertile alluvial soils in rainforests from Wyong in New South Wales to Gympie in Queensland. It is extinct in the Illawarra region of New South Wales, and was allegedly last seen in the Illawarra in 1818 by Allan Cunningham.

== Ecology ==
Fruit ripen from March to May, and are eaten by Australasian figbird, rose-crowned fruit-dove, topknot pigeon and wompoo fruit dove.

== Gallery ==
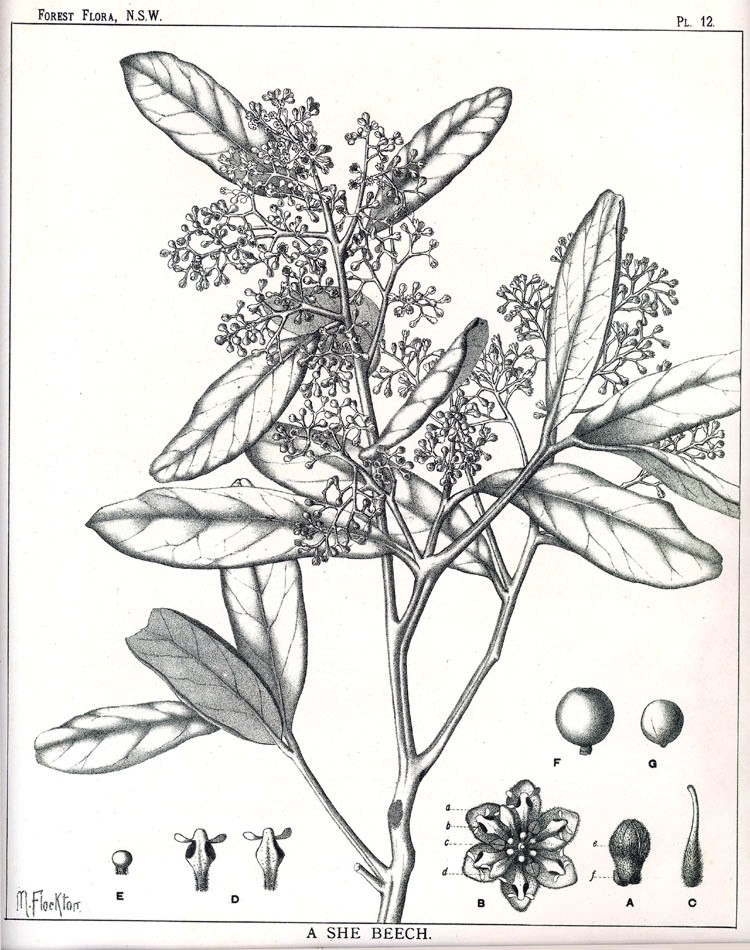
Botanical drawing by Margaret Flockton

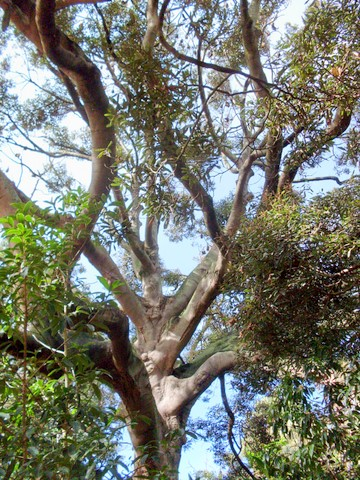
Cryptocarya obovata at the Royal Botanic Gardens, Sydney

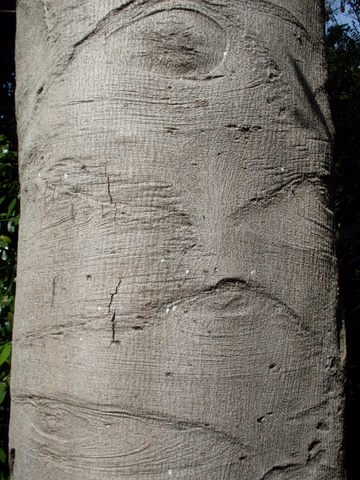
Bark

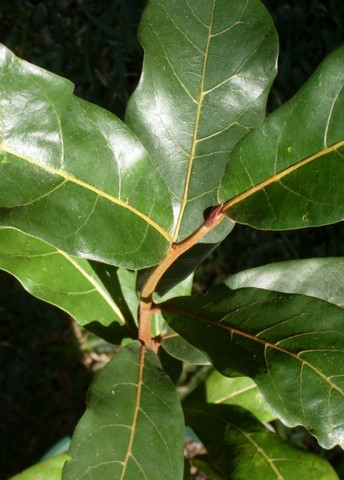
Juvenile

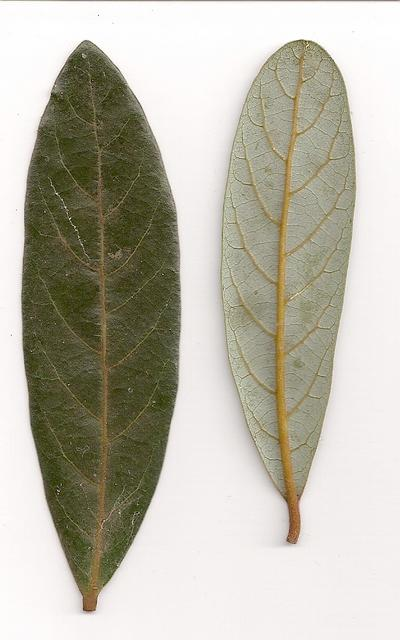
Leaves showing venation
