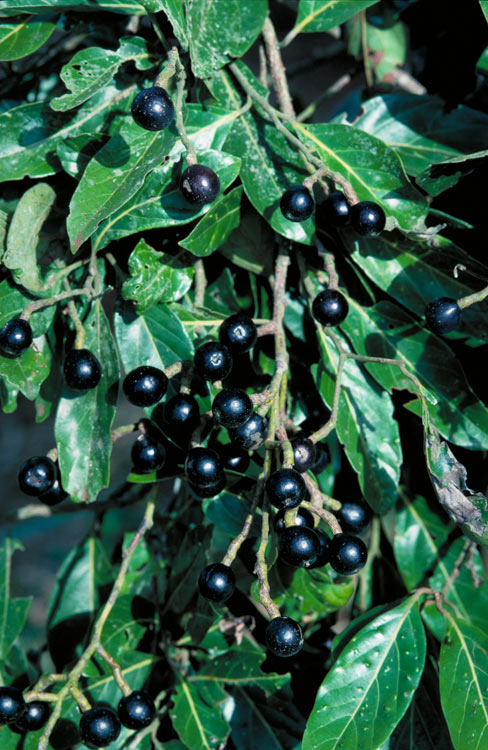

Conservation status
- Least Concern (IUCN 3.1)

Scientific classification
- Kingdom: Plantae
- Clade: Tracheophytes
- Clade: Angiosperms
- Clade: Magnoliids
- Order: Laurales
- Family: Lauraceae
- Genus: Cryptocarya
- Species: C. hypospodia

Binomial name
- Cryptocarya hypospodia F.Muell.

Synonyms
- Cryptocarya obovata var. hypospodia (F.Muell.) W.D.Francis; Cryptocarya multicostata Domin; Cryptocarya obovata var. tropica F.M.Bailey; Cryptocarya percrassa Kosterm.

= Cryptocarya hypospodia =

Species of flowering plant

Cryptocarya hypospodia, commonly known as northern laurel, white walnut, rib fruited pepperberry or north Queensland purple laurel, is species of flowering plant in the laurel family and is native to northern Australia and New Guinea. It is a tree with elliptic to egg-shaped leaves, pale brown and creamy-green flowers, and spherical black drupes.

== Description ==
Cryptocarya hypospodia is a tree that typically grows to a height of up to 30 m (98 ft), its stems usually buttressed and soft hairs on its twigs. Its leaves are elliptic to egg-shaped, 65–245 mm (2.6–9.6 in) long and 25–135 mm (0.98–5.31 in) wide on a petiole 7–17 mm (0.28–0.67 in) long. The flowers are arranged in panicles longer than the leaves and are pale brown, creamy-green, and pleasantly perfumed. The perianth tube is 1.0–1.8 mm (0.039–0.071 in) long, 1.3–1.5 mm (0.051–0.059 in) wide and hairy near the tip. The outer tepals are 1.4–1.9 mm (0.055–0.075 in) long and 0.7–1.1 mm (0.028–0.043 in) wide and the inner tepals are 1.4–1.9 mm (0.055–0.075 in) long and 1.1–1.5 mm (0.043–0.059 in) wide. The outer anthers are 0.6–0.8 mm (0.024–0.031 in) long and 0.5–0.7 mm (0.020–0.028 in) wide, the inner anthers 0.6–0.8 mm (0.024–0.031 in) long and 0.4–0.6 mm (0.016–0.024 in) wide. Flowering occurs from November to May, and the fruit is a spherical black drupe 13–18 mm (0.51–0.71 in) long and 12–17 mm (0.47–0.67 in) wide with creamy cotyledons.

== Taxonomy ==
Cryptocarya hypospodia was first formally described in 1866 by Ferdinand von Mueller in his Fragmenta phytographiae Australiae from specimens collected near Rockingham Bay.

== Distribution and habitat ==
Northern laurel grows in rainforest and gallery forest from Cape York Peninsula and south to north-east and central eastern Queensland, on Croker Island in the Northern Territory and in New Guinea.

== Ecology ==
The fruit of C. hypospodia is eaten by cassowaries and fruit-eating birds, and is food for larval stages of butterflies.
