= Shire of Tambo (Queensland) =

- Local government area
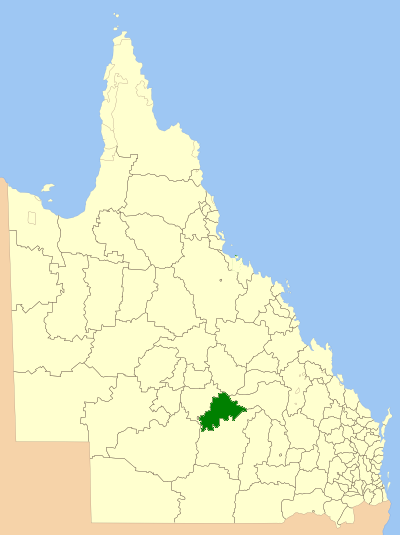
- Location within Queensland

- Country: Australia
- State: Queensland
- Established: 1881
- Council seat: Tambo

Area
  - Total: 14,083.8 km^{2} (5,437.8 sq mi)

Population
  - Total: 615 (2006 census)
  - Density: 0.04367/km^{2} (0.11310/sq mi)
- Website: Shire of Tambo
LGAs around Shire of Tambo
Blackall	Jericho	Bauhinia
Blackall	Shire of Tambo	Bauhinia
Murweh	Murweh	Murweh

The Shire of Tambo was a local government area located in central Queensland south-east of the town of Blackall. It covered an area of 14,083.8 square kilometres (5,437.8 sq mi), and existed as a local government entity from 1881 until 2008, when it amalgamated with neighbouring Shire of Blackall to form the Blackall-Tambo Region.

The council consisted of a Mayor and 9 elected councillors. No wards or electoral divisions existed.

The Barcoo River travels through the shire's former area on its way to Cooper Creek and eventually Lake Eyre. Like much of the west, sheep became the mainstay of the economy. Today, cattle and tourism are of major importance to the region.

== History ==
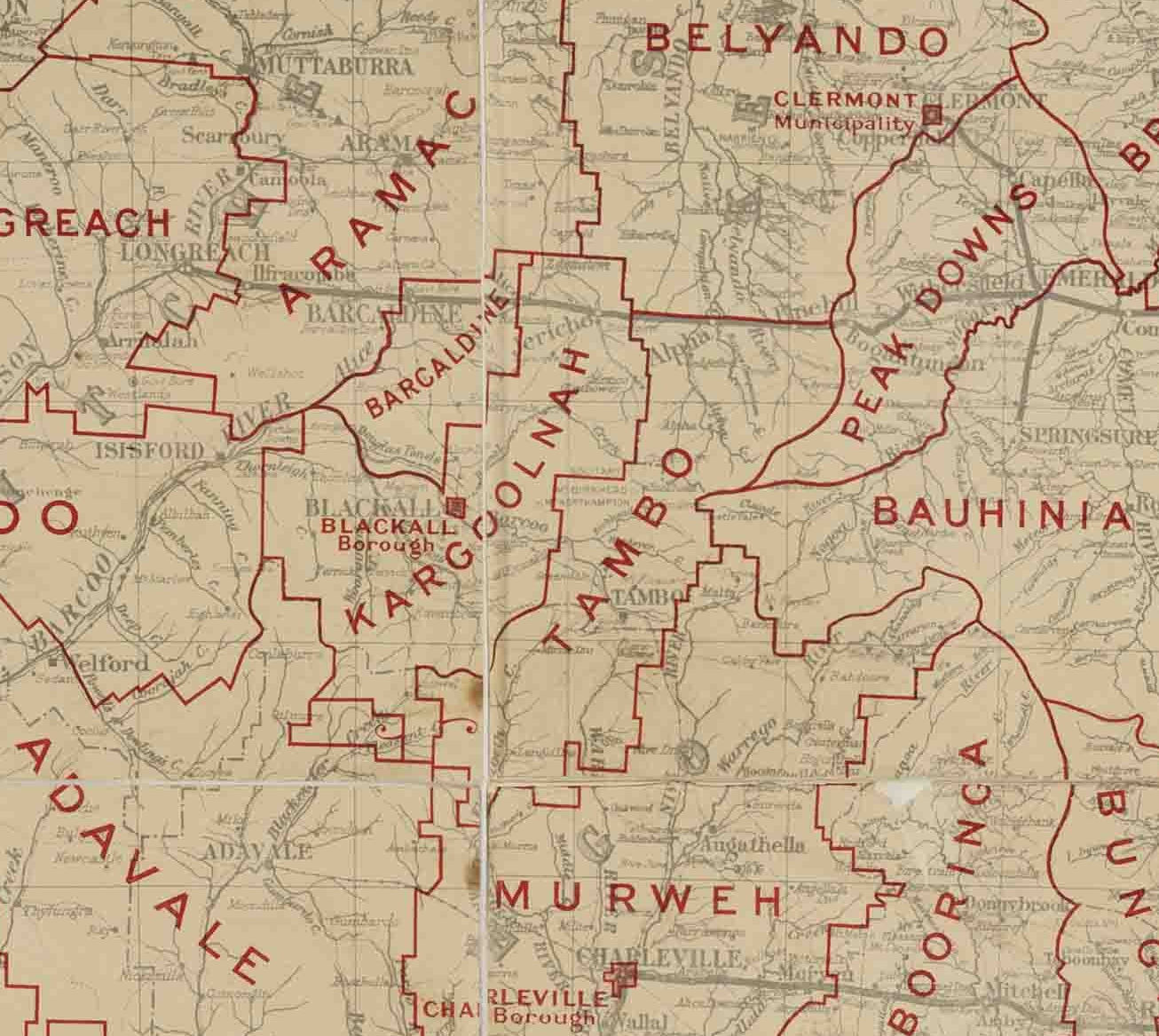
Map of Tambo Division and adjacent local government areas, March 1902

Kargoolnah Division was created on 11 November 1879 as one of 74 divisions around Queensland under the Divisional Boards Act 1879, and included the areas of Blackall, Tambo and Barcaldine and parts of Jericho. On 30 June 1881, a new Tambo Division was proclaimed and excised from Kargoolnah Division.

On 11 October 1883, there was an adjustment of boundaries between Tambo Division and Murweh Division.

With the passage of the Local Authorities Act 1902, Tambo Division became the Shire of Tambo on 31 March 1903.

On 15 March 2008, under the Local Government (Reform Implementation) Act 2007 passed by the Parliament of Queensland on 10 August 2007, the Shire of Tambo merged with the Shire of Blackall to form the Blackall-Tambo Region.

== Towns and localities ==
The Shire of Tambo included the following settlements:

- Tambo
- Bayrick
- Caldervale
- Landsdowne
- Lumeah
- Macfarlane
- Minnie Downs
- Mount Enniskillen
- Scrubby Creek
- Windeyer
- Yandarlo

== Chairmen ==
- 1927: James Miller
- 1980-1987 Howard Hobbs

== Population ==
Year	Population
1933	948
1947	882
1954	1,045
1961	1,124
1966	937
1971	831
1976	668
1981	762
1986	704
1991	616
1996	566
2001	628
2006	615
