= Blackall Masonic Temple =

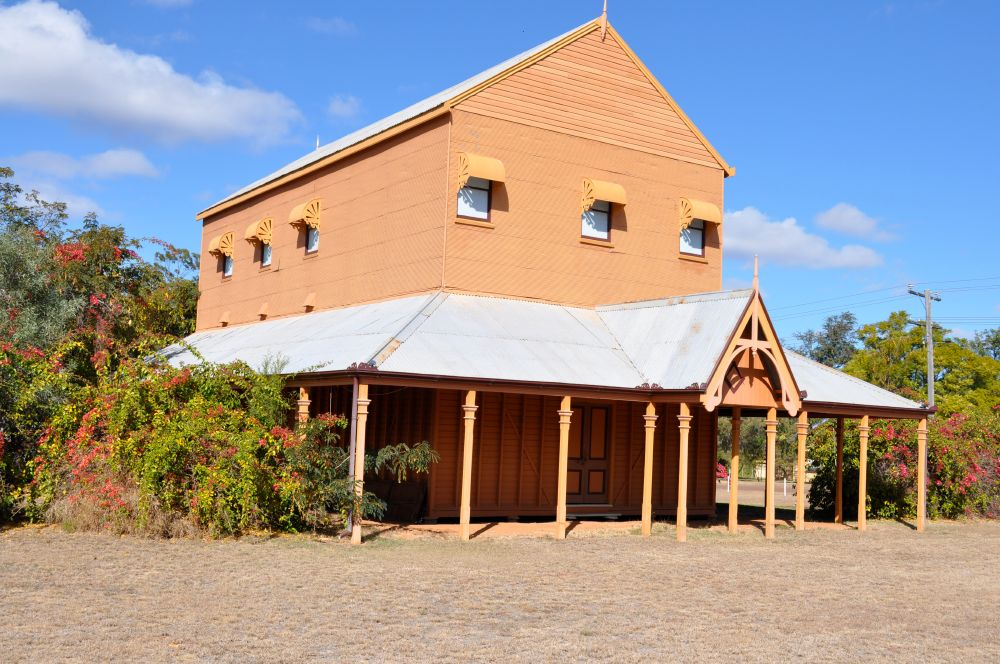
- Blackall Masonic Temple, 2011

- Location within Queensland Location within Australia
- 24.4271°S 145.4679°E
- Location: Hawthorn Street, Blackall, Blackall-Tambo Region, Queensland, Australia

History
- Design period: 1900–1914 (early 20th century)
- Built: 1908

Queensland Heritage Register
- Official name: Blackall Masonic Temple
- Type: state heritage (built)
- Designated: 21 October 1992
- Reference no.: 600032
- Significant period: 1908 (fabric)
- Significant components: dais, objects (movable) – social/community, furniture/fittings

Blackall Masonic Temple is a heritage-listed masonic temple at Hawthorn Street, Blackall, Blackall-Tambo Region, Queensland, Australia. It was built in 1908. It was added to the Queensland Heritage Register on 21 October 1992.

== History ==
The Masonic temple is the second temple in and around Blackall and was completed in 1908.

Freemasonry spread from New South Wales into Queensland in individual lodges. The first Freemason's lodge in Queensland was established in 1859, shortly before Separation from New South Wales. New lodges were formed as settlement spread.

Blackall was surveyed and gazetted as a town in 1868. It served as a commercial and social centre for pastoral stations in the surrounding area and was the major western town until eclipsed by Barcaldine, which was founded to serve the terminus of the Central Western Railway in 1886. Freemasonry was established in Blackall in May 1887 when a group of seven masons met at the Methodist Church, whose Minister was a Freemason, in order to found a lodge. By the end of the year there were 32 members. The first candidate initiated, James McKenzie, provided a brick building in Short Street to be used as a temple. This was used until 1905–6 when the owner required the building for other purposes. It was demolished in 1958.

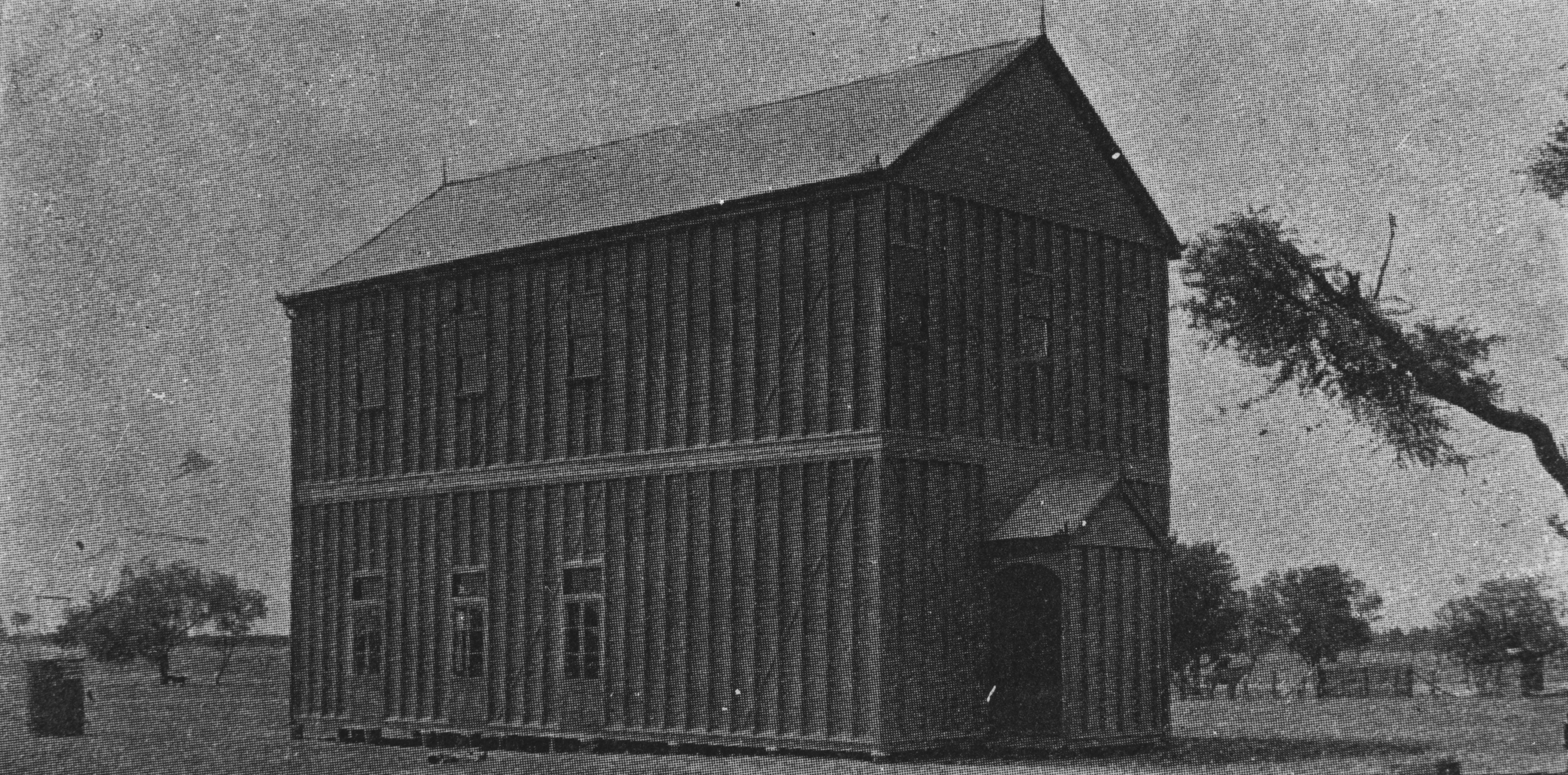
Blackall Masonic Hall, 1908

For a time, the lodge then met at the former Government Lands Office, but this was not convenient and it was decided to construct a new building. A.E. Hewer, R.E. Burton and J.H. Hart donated an acre of land in Hawthorne Street and a two-storey building was erected on it. Furniture which is still in use was donated by A.H. Whittingham. The new building was dedicated in May 1908, exactly 21 years after the lodge was first established and cost £1603 including the supply of gas and running water.

Members of the lodge were mainly prominent townsmen and managers and overseers from outlying stations such as Mt Marlow, Northampton, Emmet Downs, Terrick Terrick, Ravensbourne and Bloomfield. Attendance at lodge meetings was a major undertaking for many members who had to travel great distances, often over poor or non-existent roads. The fellowship associated with Freemasonry was very important to men living in areas of isolated or scattered settlement or in jobs which were itinerant or seasonal. Lodges hosted social events, contributed to local charities and provided opportunities for local businessmen to meet socially, all of which made an important contribution to the life the town.

The temple has remained much as it was when constructed, although new gates and posts were installed in 1987.

== Description ==
Blackall Masonic Lodge is located in the centre of a level site at the corner of Hawthorn and Garden Streets. Its axis runs east west and it faces west and is parallel to Garden Street. It has a rectangular plan form and is two storeyed and supported on timber stumps. It has a gabled roof with a verandah on the north, west and east sides supported by 4-inch (100 mm) chamfered timber posts at 6-foot (1.8 m) centres. Bougainvillea are located on the north and south sides and at the south west corner of the site. The boundary fence consists of short tubular posts with chain suspended between; this replaced an earlier timber and chain wire fence. The original single rolled steel entrance gate which was located on the axis of the building in Hawthorne Street has been replaced with a set of low double gates which have maintained the rolled steel beehive pattern. What appear to be original gate posts have been relocated inside this gate.

The ground floor walls rise to approximately 15 feet (4.6 m) and have an exposed frame 4-by-2-inch (102 by 51 mm) stud wall at 18-inch (460 mm) centres. Above this and the verandah the upper level is clad in horizontal mini profile corrugated galvanised iron and above this the gables have rusticated boards. Three double hung windows are located in west and north elevations and there are four windows in the south elevation. Each of these have quadrant form hoods in galvanised iron. The roof and verandah are clad in corrugated galvanised iron. A narrow timber stair runs from the upper level across the back of the building.

The building is entered via a set of double timber doors centrally located in the west elevation and accentuated by a steep pitched verandah gable over. The entrance opens into a hall that contains a half turn timber stair with landings that rises to the temple on the upper floor. To the south of the entrance is a store room and to the east is the supper room entered through a set of timber double doors. Symmetrically located each side of the supper room are French doors that open out onto the north and south verandahs. The floors are 6" tongue and grooved timber boards. The walls to the supper room are horizontal beaded boards and the ceiling is the exposed heavy joists of the upper floor with herringbone strutting.

The stair leads to a landing at the upper floor, off this to the south is a dressing room and to the east is the temple which is accessed through a single timber door. The walls of the temple are lined in horizontal beaded boards. The ceiling is lined in the same material and follows the rafter line to the level of the collar ties and is horizontal from this point. The space is painted in the traditional light blue. The furnishing within the temple consist of side benches for the brethren with a raised dais at the east end which has a shallow curved front with a centrally located Masters chair and a number of bentwood chairs either side. Further to the sides are more substantial chairs to accommodate the immediate Past Master and visiting Masters. Immediately in front of the Master is the altar and to the left is the Secretary/Treasurer. Forward of this is seating for the Senior and Junior Deacons and on the left hand side seating for the Senior and Junior Wardens. At the opposite end of the temple is the Tilers chair and forward of this is the black and white tiled square and sitting on this is the ceremonial tripod supporting a pulley and stone block.

== Post Masonic Use ==
The building ceased usage as a Masonic Temple in 2016. The downstairs area has now been converted to a tea room and antique and art gallery. The upstairs temple has been preserved and guided tours are offered.

== Heritage listing ==
Blackall Masonic Temple was listed on the Queensland Heritage Register on 21 October 1992 having satisfied the following criteria.

The place is important in demonstrating the evolution or pattern of Queensland's history.

The Masonic temple is important in demonstrating the development of Blackall in the nineteenth century and the spread of Freemasonry through Queensland in the wake of European settlement.

The place is important in demonstrating the principal characteristics of a particular class of cultural places.

The Blackall temple is important as a characteristic and intact example of a regional timber Masonic temple, a category of building prominent in the streetscape and important in the social life of many country towns.

The place is important because of its aesthetic significance.

The Blackall temple is important as a characteristic and intact example of a regional timber Masonic temple, a category of building prominent in the streetscape and important in the social life of many country towns.

The place has a strong or special association with a particular community or cultural group for social, cultural or spiritual reasons.

The Masonic temple, Blackall, has a special association with those Freemasons living in and around Blackall and with the Freemasonry movement as an early temple in Queensland.
