= BKQ =

BKQ could refer to:

- Bakairi language; ISO 639-3 language code: bkq
- Blackall Airport, Australia; IATA airport code BKQ
- Hamilton Square railway station, England; National Rail station code BKQ
