= Minnie Downs, Queensland =

Minnie Downs
- Suburb
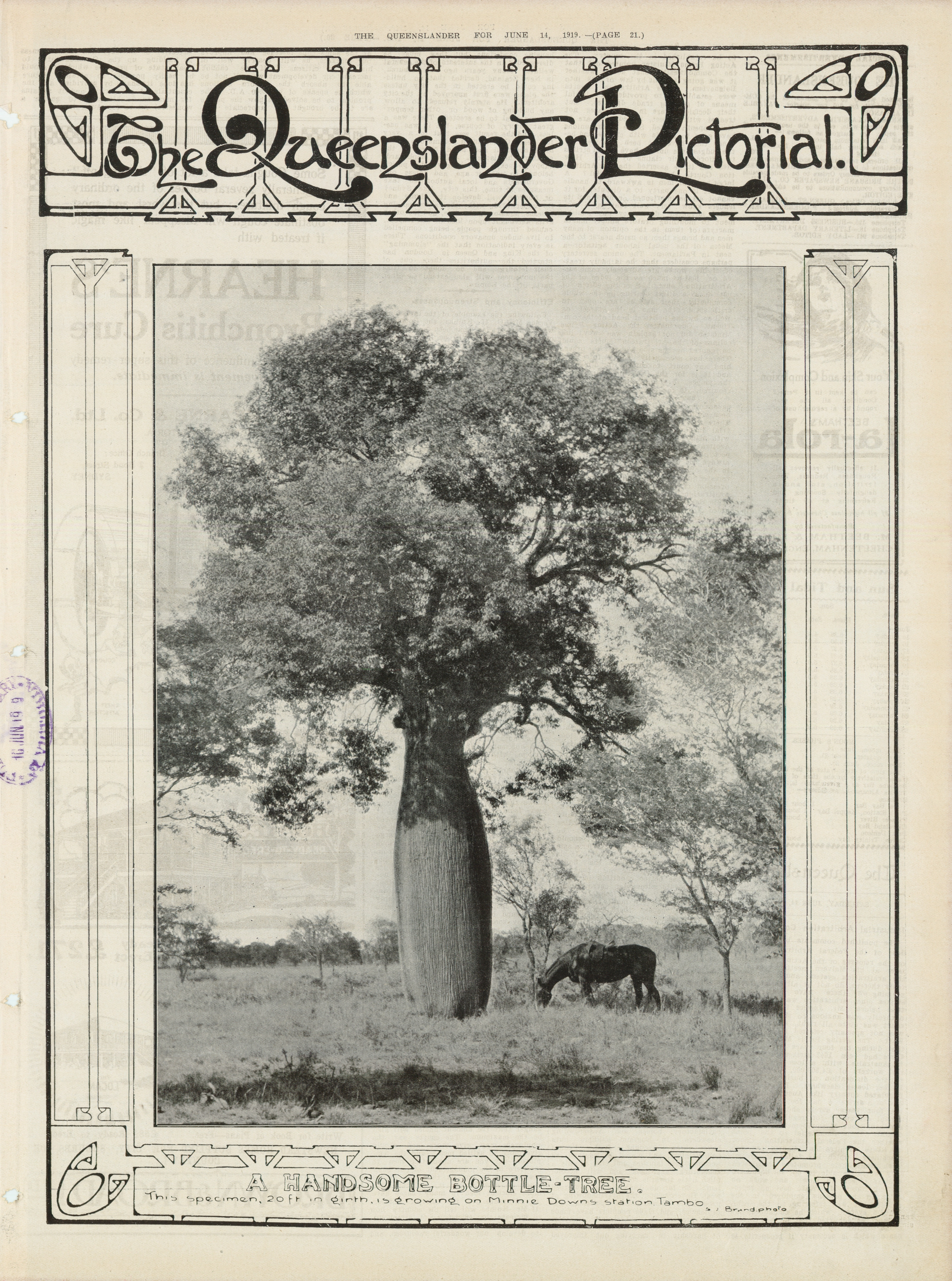
- A bottle tree, 20 ft in girth, Minnie Downs station, 1919

- Interactive map of Minnie Downs
- Coordinates: 25.0858°S 145.8522°E
- Country: Australia
- State: Queensland
- LGA: Blackall-Tambo Region
- Location: 75.8 km (47.1 mi) SW of Tambo; 159 km (99 mi) SSE of Blackall; 404 km (251 mi) NW of Roma; 881 km (547 mi) WNW of Brisbane

Government
  - State electorate: Gregory
  - Federal division: Maranoa

Area
  - Total: 928.6 km^{2} (358.5 sq mi)

Population
  - Total: 12 (2021 census)
  - Density: 0.0129/km^{2} (0.0335/sq mi)
- Time zone: UTC+10:00 (AEST)
- Postcode: 4478
Suburbs around Minnie Downs
Blackall	Blackall	Macfarlane
Blackall	Minnie Downs	Lansdowne
Blackall	Lumeah	Lansdowne

Minnie Downs is a rural locality in the Blackall-Tambo Region, Queensland, Australia. In the 2021 census, Minnie Downs had a population of 12 people.

== Geography ==
The Landsborough Highway passes to the north-east. Langlo Road commences at the highway and enters the locality from the north-east (Macfarlane) and exits to the south (Lumeah).

Elizabeth Creek commences in the north of the locality at the confluence of Western Head Creek and Boggy Creek. It is a braided creek which flows south, exiting to the south (Lumeah) where Elizabeth Creek becomes a tributary of the Langlo River.

The pastoral station "Minnie Downs" is in the north-east of the locality.

The land use in the locality is grazing on native vegetation.

== History ==
In 1861, Mr J. T. Allen established the "Elizabeth Creek" pastoral station. In 1873, it was bought by the Archer brothers who renamed it Minnie Downs in honour of Mary Louise (Minnie) Mackenzie, the eldest daughter of Sir Robert Ramsay Mackenzie, who married Alexander Archer (one of the Archer brothers) in 1871. In 1890, Alexander and Minnie Archer died in the shipwreck of the RMS Quetta.

Minnie Downs was developed as a sheep station and horse stud. The Minnie Downs pastoral station can be seen on an 1892 map.

== Demographics ==
In the 2016 census, Minnie Downs had a population of 13 people.

In the 2021 census, Minnie Downs had a population of 12 people.

== Education ==
There are no schools in Minnie Downs. The nearest government school is Tambo State School (Kindergarten to Year 10) in Tambo to the north-east, but it would be too distant from some parts of Minnie Downs to attend. Also there is no nearby school providing education to Year 12. The alternatives are distance education and boarding school.
