= Yalleroi =

- Town
- Coordinates: 24.0680°S 145.7591°E
- Country: Australia
- State: Queensland
- LGA: Blackall-Tambo Region
- Location: 54.8 km (34.1 mi) NE of Blackall; 67.4 km (41.9 mi) SW of Jericho; 290 km (180 mi) WSW of Emerald; 560 km (350 mi) W of Rockhampton; 1,017 km (632 mi) NW of Brisbane

Government
  - State electorate: Gregory
  - Federal division: Flynn
- Time zone: UTC+10:00 (AEST)
- Postcode: 4472

Yalleroi is a rural town in the north of the locality of Blackall in the Blackall-Tambo Region, Queensland, Australia.

== Geography ==
The Blackall-Jericho Road enters Yalleroi from the south (from the town of Blackall) and exits to the north (towards the town of Jericho).

== History ==
The locality name is derived from pastoral run name and is an Aboriginal word, meaning stone/stony. The town of Yalleroi appears on a 1913 survey plan.

Yalleroi State School opened on 2 February 1933 and closed on 24 January 1984. It was on the south-east corner of Mitchell Street and Flinders Street (24.0674°S 145.7603°E).

Bill D'Arcy taught at the school during the 1960s prior to embarking on a political career. On 1 November 2000, a jury found D'Arcy was guilty of 18 child sex charges, including three of rape, which occurred at Yalleroi State School. On 17 November 2000, D'Arcy was sentenced to 14 years jail. D'Arcy was released from prison in 2007. He has continued to profess his innocence.

== Education ==
There are no schools in Yalleroi. The nearest government school is Blackall State School (Prep to Year 12) in the town of Blackall to the south-west. There is also a Catholic primary school in the town of Blackall.
