= Blackall Airport =

Airport in Queensland, Australia

- IATA: BKQ; ICAO: YBCK

Summary
- Airport type: Public
- Owner: Blackall-Tambo Regional Council
- Location: Blackall, Queensland
- Elevation AMSL: 928 ft / 283 m
- Coordinates: 24°25′54″S 145°25′47″E

Map
- Location in Queensland

Runways
Direction	Length		Surface
Direction	m	ft	Surface
06/24	1,688	5,538	Asphalt
12/30	1,603	5,259	Clay
- Sources: Australian AIP and aerodrome chart

Blackall Airport (IATA: BKQ, ICAO: YBCK) is an airport located 2 nautical miles (3.7 km; 2.3 mi) west southwest of Blackall, Queensland, Australia.

== Airlines and destinations ==
Airlines	Destinations
QantasLink	Brisbane, Longreach

== See also ==
- List of airports in Queensland
