= Tambo, Queensland =

Tambo
- Town
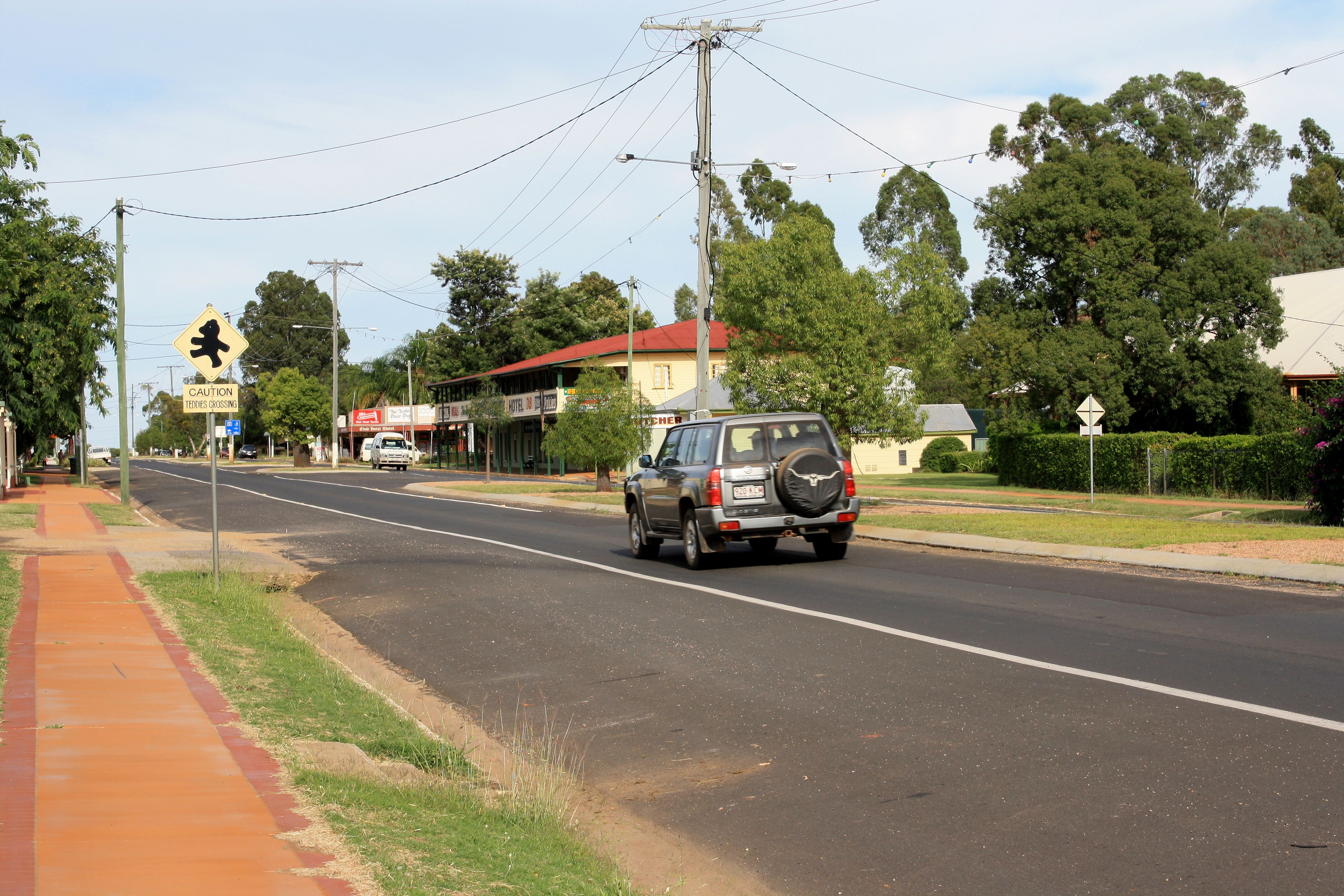
- Arthur Street, Tambo

- Interactive map of Tambo
- Coordinates: 24.8844°S 146.2530°E
- Country: Australia
- State: Queensland
- LGA: Blackall-Tambo Region
- Location: 102 km (63 mi) SE of Blackall; 201 km (125 mi) N of Charleville; 386 km (240 mi) NW of Roma; 863 km (536 mi) NW of Brisbane
- Established: 1863

Government
  - State electorate: Gregory
  - Federal division: Maranoa

Area
  - Total: 617.9 km^{2} (238.6 sq mi)
- Elevation: 395 m (1,296 ft)

Population
  - Totals: 318 (2021 locality); 283 (2021 town)
  - Density: 0.5146/km^{2} (1.3329/sq mi)
- Time zone: UTC+10:00 (AEST)
- Postcode: 4478
- Mean max temp: 29.0 °C (84.2 °F)
- Mean min temp: 12.6 °C (54.7 °F)
- Annual rainfall: 535.7 mm (21.09 in)
Localities around Tambo
| Mount Enniskillen | Windeyer | Caldervale |
| Macfarlane | Tambo | Caldervale |
| Lansdowne | Lansdowne | Yandarlo |

Tambo is a rural town and locality in the Blackall-Tambo Region, Queensland, Australia. Cattle and tourism are the major industries of the town. A number of heritage buildings survive from the earliest days of settlement. In the 2021 census, the population of the locality was 318 people, while the population of the town was 283 people.

== Geography ==
Tambo is in Central West Queensland, Australia, on the banks of the Barcoo River. Tambo is 101 kilometres (63 mi) southeast of the town of Blackall via the Landsborough Highway, 118 kilometres (73 mi) north of Augathella, 201 kilometres (125 mi) north of Charleville, 736 kilometres (457 mi) north west of Toowoomba and approximately 862 kilometres (536 mi) north west of the state capital, Brisbane.

The Barcoo River runs through the town and sits near the Grey Range – part of the "Roof of Queensland" section of the Great Dividing Range.

The Landsborough Highway—part of the National Highway network linking Brisbane and Darwin—passes through Tambo. Tambo is also connected to Springsure and Alpha by the Dawson Developmental Road and the Alpha Tambo Road.

== History ==
The area on which the town of Tambo now sits was home of many different Aboriginal groups including the Wadjaling, Wadjalad, Wadjabangai, and Pitjara.

The first European exploration of the district was by Sir Thomas Mitchell, popularly known as "Major Mitchell", in 1846. For approximately the next 15 years the area was unused until selectors began taking land in 1861.

The town of Carrangarra was founded in 1863, making it the oldest town in western Queensland. Like much of the west, sheep became the mainstay of the economy. The settlement was renamed Tambo in 1868. The name Tambo comes from an Indigenous Australian word, meaning hidden place, or "resting place, fish, shady waters, hidden waters, a secluded spot, hidden place and native yam."

A branch of the Queensland National Bank was first established in 1875.

Tambo State School opened on 28 February 1876.

A Bush Mission church was built from timber in 1877 for Reverend Peter Campbell, an itinerant preacher. It was designed by JW Wilson. It was built from timber. It has been demolished.

St Mary's Catholic Church was a Roman Catholic church at 14 Star Street (24.884064°S 146.255°E). It was built in 1886. On 10 January 1955, it was demolished in a storm. On 18 December 1955, a new church, Our Lady of Victories War Memorical Catholic Church, was blessed and officially opened by Bishop Tynan on the same site as the earlier church. It was designed by Frank Cullen and built from timber.

The Courthouse was built in 1888.

Tambo Presbyterian Church was opened on Sunday 24 June 1888 by Reverend J. Mably. It was built from timber and cost £750. It has been demolished.

Tambo was the location of Qantas' first fatal accident. An Airco DH.9 crashed on 24 March 1927 with the loss of three lives after the plane stalled while landing.

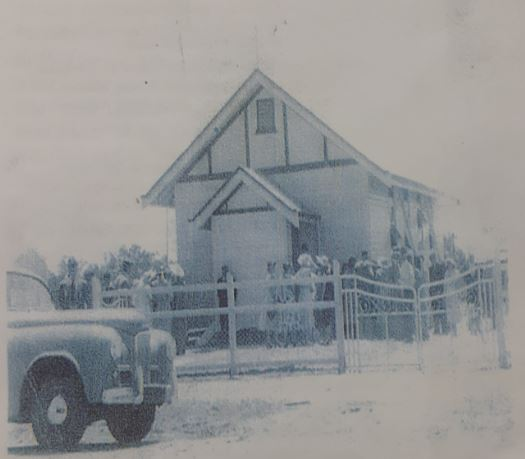
The opening and dedication of St Michael's and All Angels' Anglican Church, 19 October 1952

St Michael's and All Angels Anglican Church was officially opened by Bishop Halford on Sunday 29 September 1912. It was a timber church in Edward Street. It was totally destroyed in a cyclone on Sunday 9 January 1938. Anglican services were held in the Council Chambers. In 1947, the land in Edward Street was sold to the Queensland Country Women's Association for a student hostel and land was purchased in Arthur Street for a new church. After overcoming many difficulties, a replacement church was finally opened in October 1952 by Bishop James Housden. A hall was built at the rear of the church in 1964.

Until 2008, Tambo was the administrative centre of the Shire of Tambo. In 2008, as part of the Queensland Government's amalgamation of local government areas, the Shire of Tambo and the neighbouring Shire of Blackall were both abolished and Tambo is now a part of the Blackall-Tambo Region.

Tambo was cut off for eight days during the 2010–2011 Queensland floods.

== Demographics ==
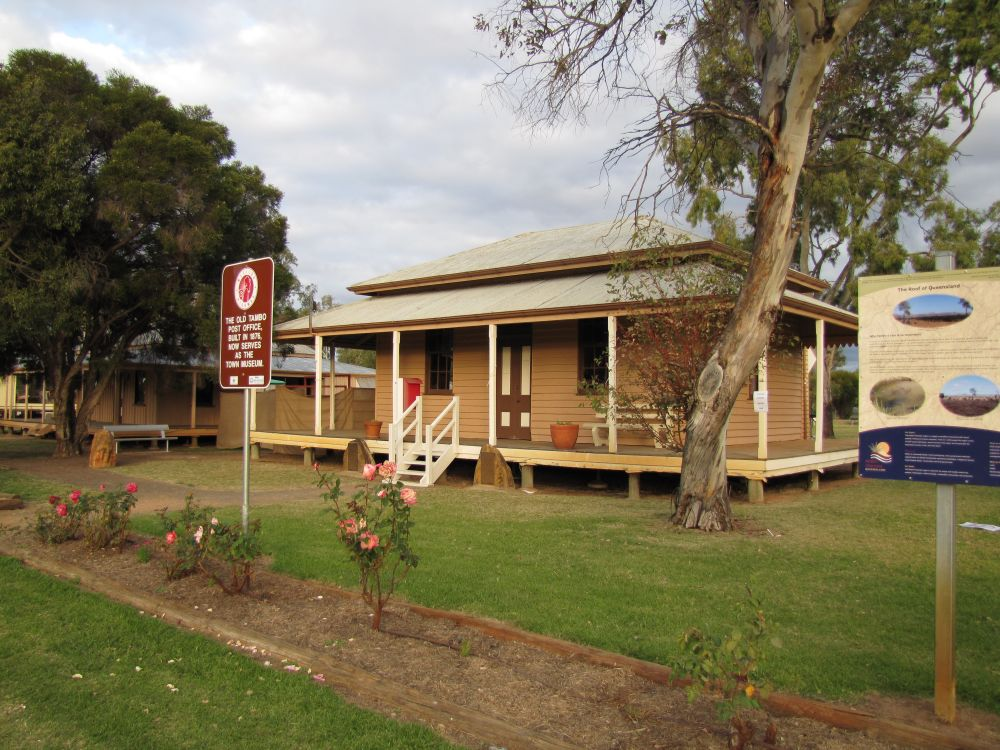
Former Tambo Post Office, 2013

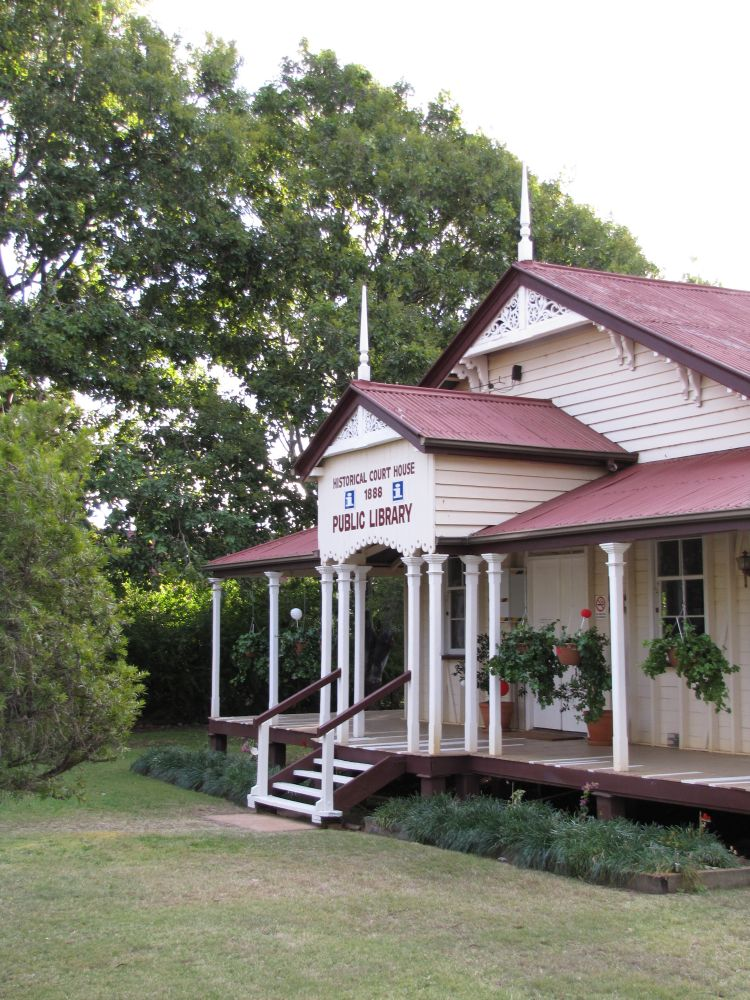
Former Tambo Court House (now library), 2013

| Census Year | Locality | Town | Notes |
|---|---|---|---|
| 2001 census | | 357 | |
| 2006 census | | 345 | About 7% of the population of the town's population identified as Aboriginal or Torres Strait Islander while about 6% were born outside Australia. |
| 2016 census | 367 | 326 | |
| 2021 census | 318 | 283 | |

== Heritage listings ==
Tambo has a number of heritage-listed sites, including:

- Former Tambo Post Office, Arthur Street (24.8830°S 146.2566°E)
- Former Tambo Court House, 9 Arthur Street (24.8822°S 146.2563°E)

== Economy ==
The chief industries of the town and district are grazing properties for sheep and cattle. There was a sawmill (operated by N.K Collins who operated a sawmill in Augathella) which closed in 2011. The sawmill reopened March 2018.

== Education ==
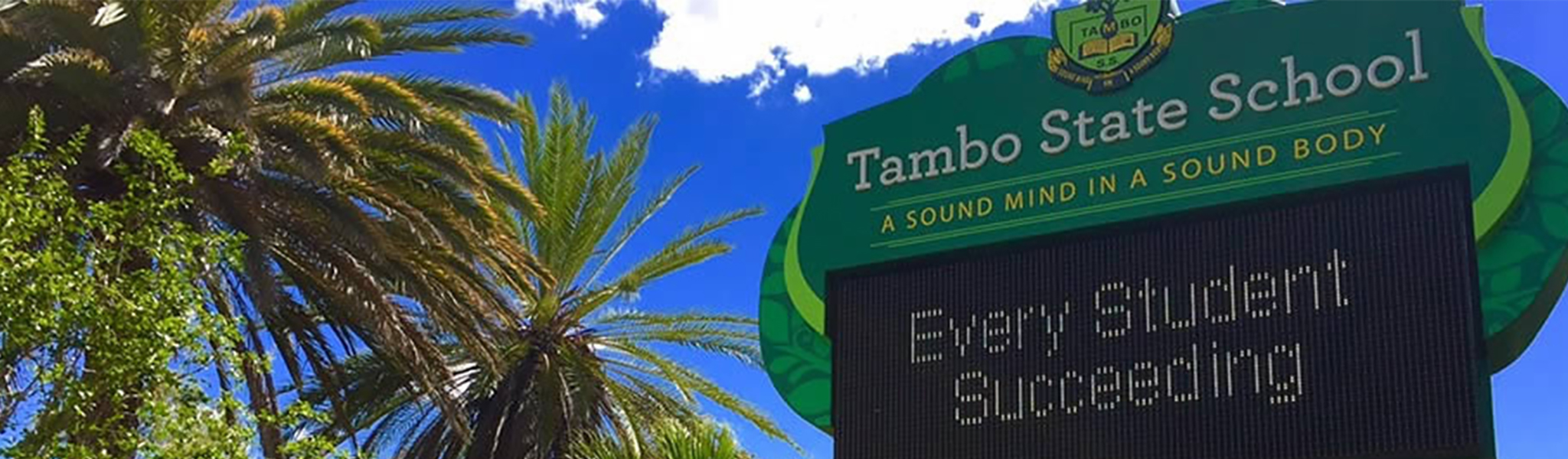
Signage, Tambo State School, 2022

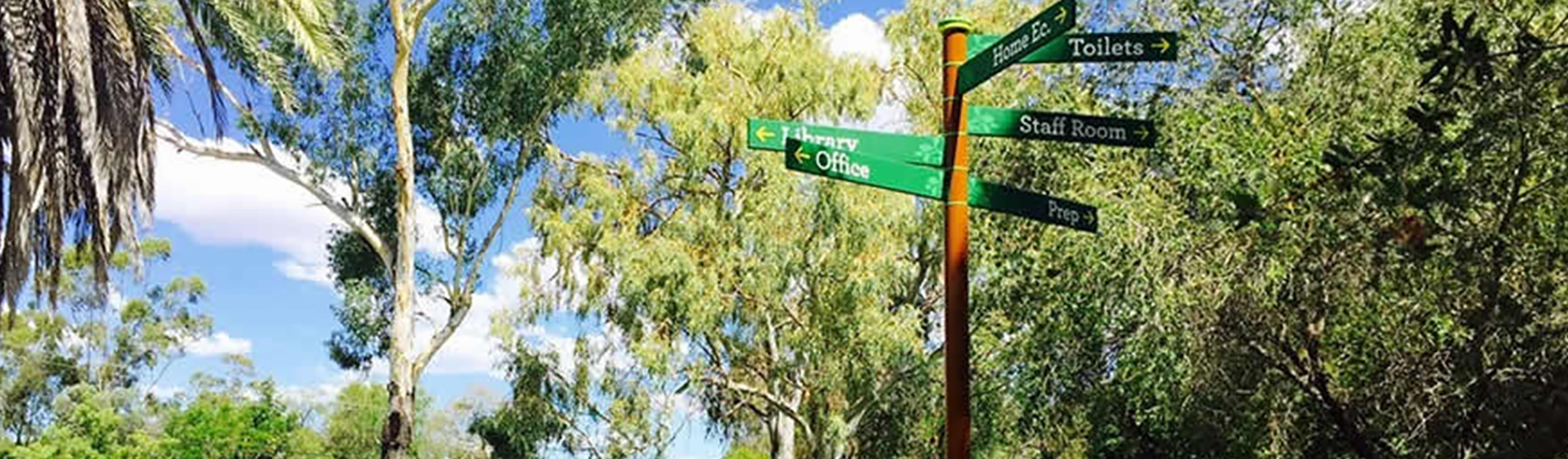
Signpost, Tambo State School, 2022

Tambo State School is a government primary and secondary (Kindergarten to Year 10) school for boys and girls at 20 Mitchell Street (24.8845°S 146.2537°E). In 2018, the school had an enrolment of 79 students with 11 teachers and 11 non-teaching staff (7 full-time equivalent).

There are no secondary schools providing schooling to Year 12 within Tambo or nearby areas; options are distance education and boarding school.

== Amenities ==
The heritage-listed former Courthouse in Arthur Street contains the Tambo Visitor Information Centre and the Tambo Library.

The Tambo branch of the Queensland Country Women's Association meets at the Royal Carrangarra Hotel in Arthur Street.

Our Lady of Victories War Memorial Catholic Church is at 14 Star Street (24.884064°S 146.255°E).

St Michael and All Angels Anglican Church is in Arthur Street (24.882051°S 146.257°E).

== Attractions ==
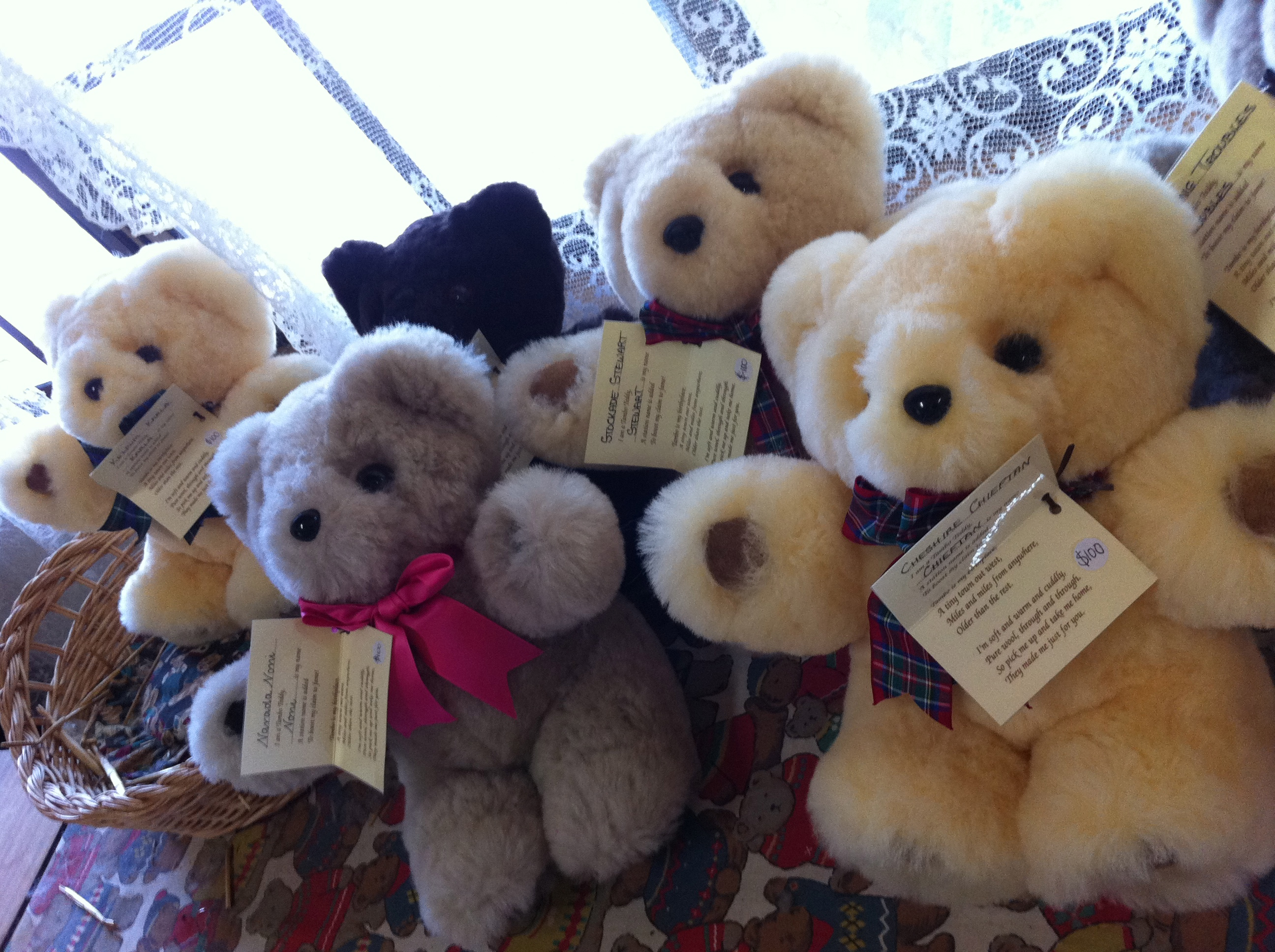
Sample of the Tambo Teddies manufactured in Tambo

Tambo is also famous for its Tambo Teddy Workshop, set up by three local women in 1992 to help promote the wool industry after years of drought had caused wool prices to fall. In 2018, one of these teddies was given to Prince Harry and his wife Meghan (the Duke and Duchess of Sussex) when they visited Australia. There have been numerous commercials advertising the teddies.

In 2018 Ben's Chicken Racing started in the town at The Royal Carrangarra Hotel, racing chickens and entertaining people nightly from April - October, and has brought thousands to the town. It raises money for rural children's charities.

The "Tambo Heritage Trail" includes 17 buildings within the town's precinct of historical importance. They include:

- Post and Telegraph office building
- Reg Barry's Memorial
- Survey Marker
- Old Tambo Post Office (1876)
- Courthouse (1888)
- Tambo Shire Hall
- Masonic Lodge
- Old Powerhouse
- Tambo State School
- Windmill at Tambo Mill Motel
- Primary Health Care
- The Club Hotel
- General Store
- Royal Carrangarra Hotel
- Tambo Teddies Workshop
- Queensland National Bank

== Climate ==
Temperatures in Tambo range from 35 °C in summer to 21 °C in winter. Minimum temperatures in winter often drop below freezing. The average annual rainfall is 531.1 mm (20.93 in), the majority of which falls between December and March.

Climate data for Tambo (Tambo Post Office, temperature 1931–present, rainfall 1877–present)
| Month | Jan | Feb | Mar | Apr | May | Jun | Jul | Aug | Sep | Oct | Nov | Dec | Year |
|---|---|---|---|---|---|---|---|---|---|---|---|---|---|
| Record high °C (°F) | 44.5 (112.1) | 43.0 (109.4) | 42.0 (107.6) | 37.1 (98.8) | 34.4 (93.9) | 31.8 (89.2) | 30.0 (86.0) | 35.8 (96.4) | 39.0 (102.2) | 41.0 (105.8) | 43.3 (109.9) | 43.3 (109.9) | 44.5 (112.1) |
| Mean daily maximum °C (°F) | 35.0 (95.0) | 33.9 (93.0) | 32.5 (90.5) | 29.2 (84.6) | 25.0 (77.0) | 21.7 (71.1) | 21.3 (70.3) | 23.6 (74.5) | 27.5 (81.5) | 31.0 (87.8) | 33.3 (91.9) | 34.8 (94.6) | 29.1 (84.4) |
| Mean daily minimum °C (°F) | 20.6 (69.1) | 20.0 (68.0) | 17.7 (63.9) | 12.8 (55.0) | 8.2 (46.8) | 5.0 (41.0) | 3.9 (39.0) | 5.1 (41.2) | 9.2 (48.6) | 13.9 (57.0) | 17.1 (62.8) | 19.3 (66.7) | 12.7 (54.9) |
| Record low °C (°F) | 10.4 (50.7) | 9.5 (49.1) | 5.8 (42.4) | 0.0 (32.0) | −3.0 (26.6) | −5.0 (23.0) | −5.6 (21.9) | −5.6 (21.9) | −2.5 (27.5) | −0.5 (31.1) | 4.4 (39.9) | 7.8 (46.0) | −5.6 (21.9) |
| Average rainfall mm (inches) | 79.4 (3.13) | 76.8 (3.02) | 61.0 (2.40) | 35.7 (1.41) | 33.0 (1.30) | 28.1 (1.11) | 26.6 (1.05) | 18.7 (0.74) | 21.5 (0.85) | 34.2 (1.35) | 47.4 (1.87) | 68.7 (2.70) | 531.1 (20.93) |
| Average rainy days (≥ 0.2mm) | 7.6 | 6.8 | 5.7 | 3.3 | 3.3 | 3.3 | 3.1 | 2.5 | 3.1 | 4.7 | 5.7 | 6.7 | 55.8 |
Source: Bureau of Meteorology

== Gallery ==
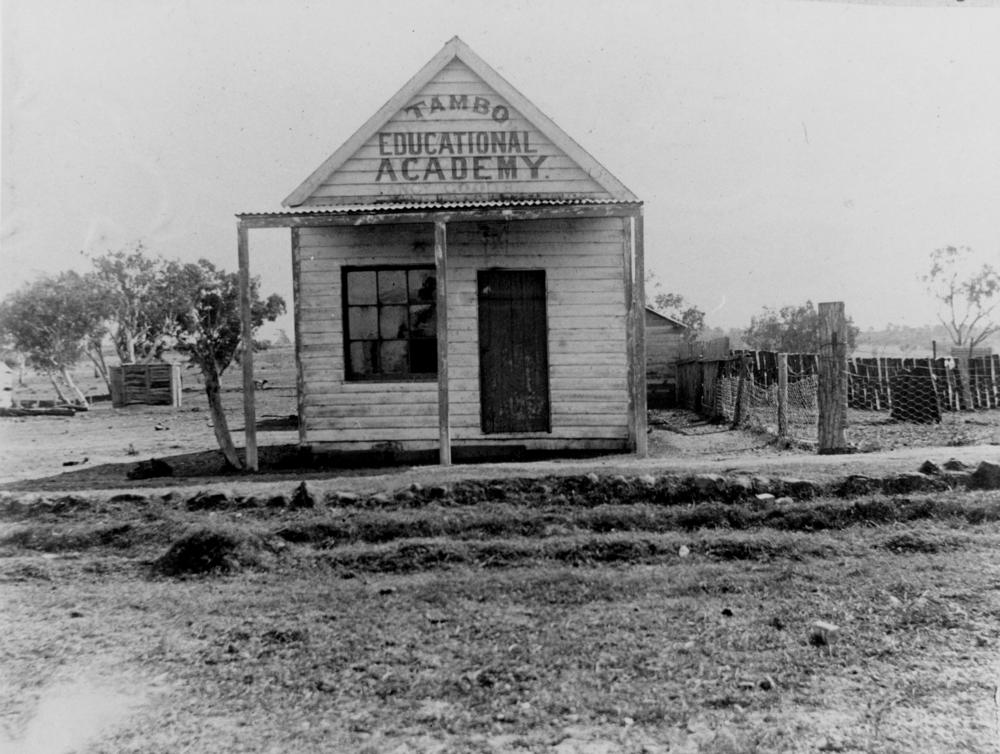
Tambo Educational Academy. 1905

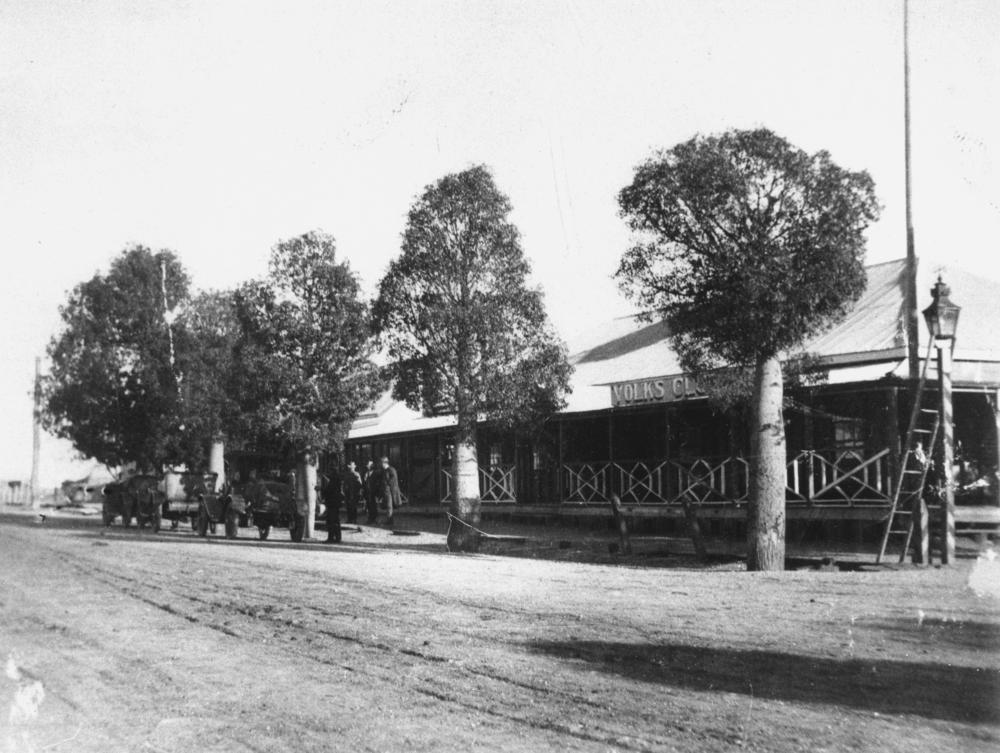
Volk's Club Hotel, circa 1912

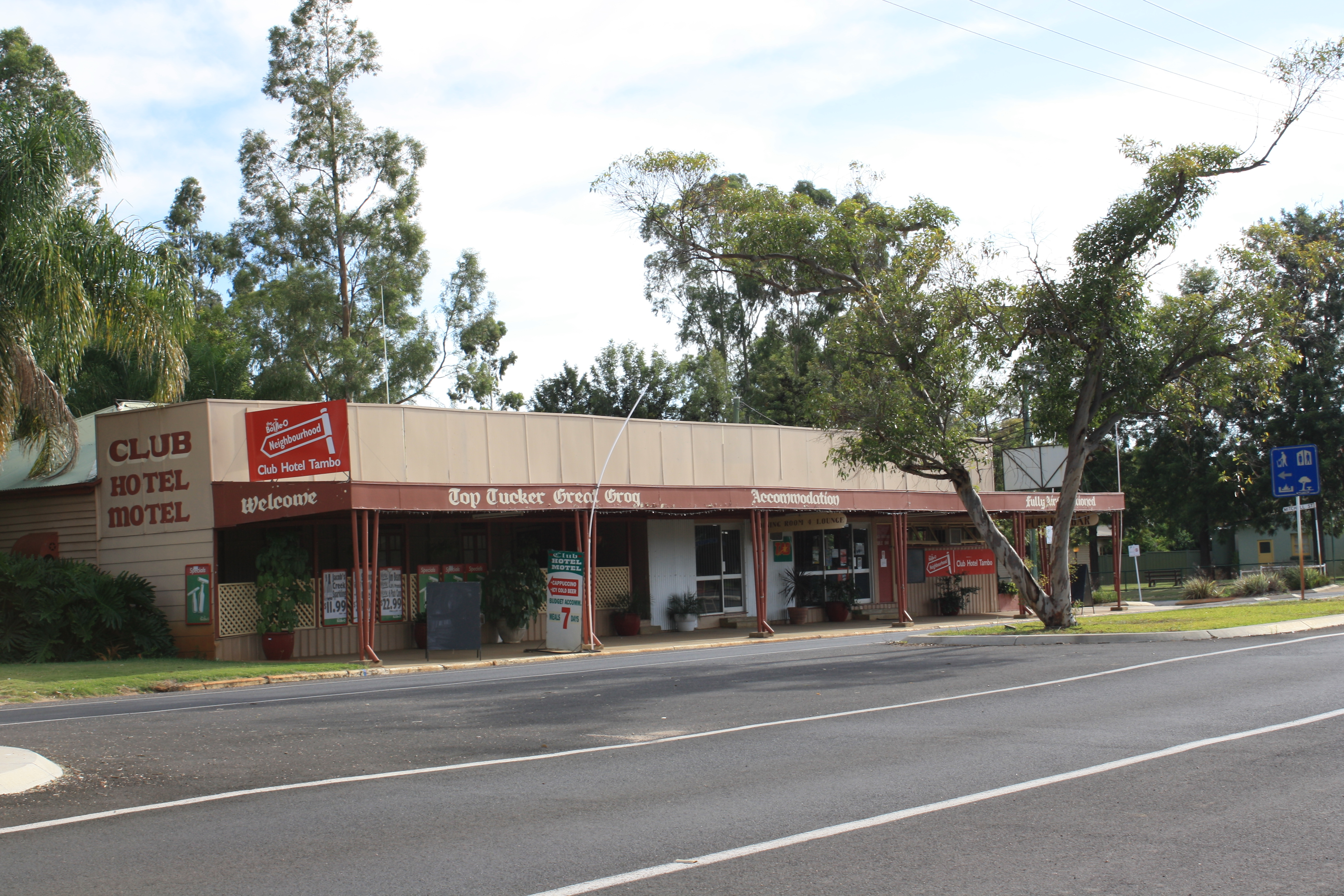
The Club Hotel, 2012

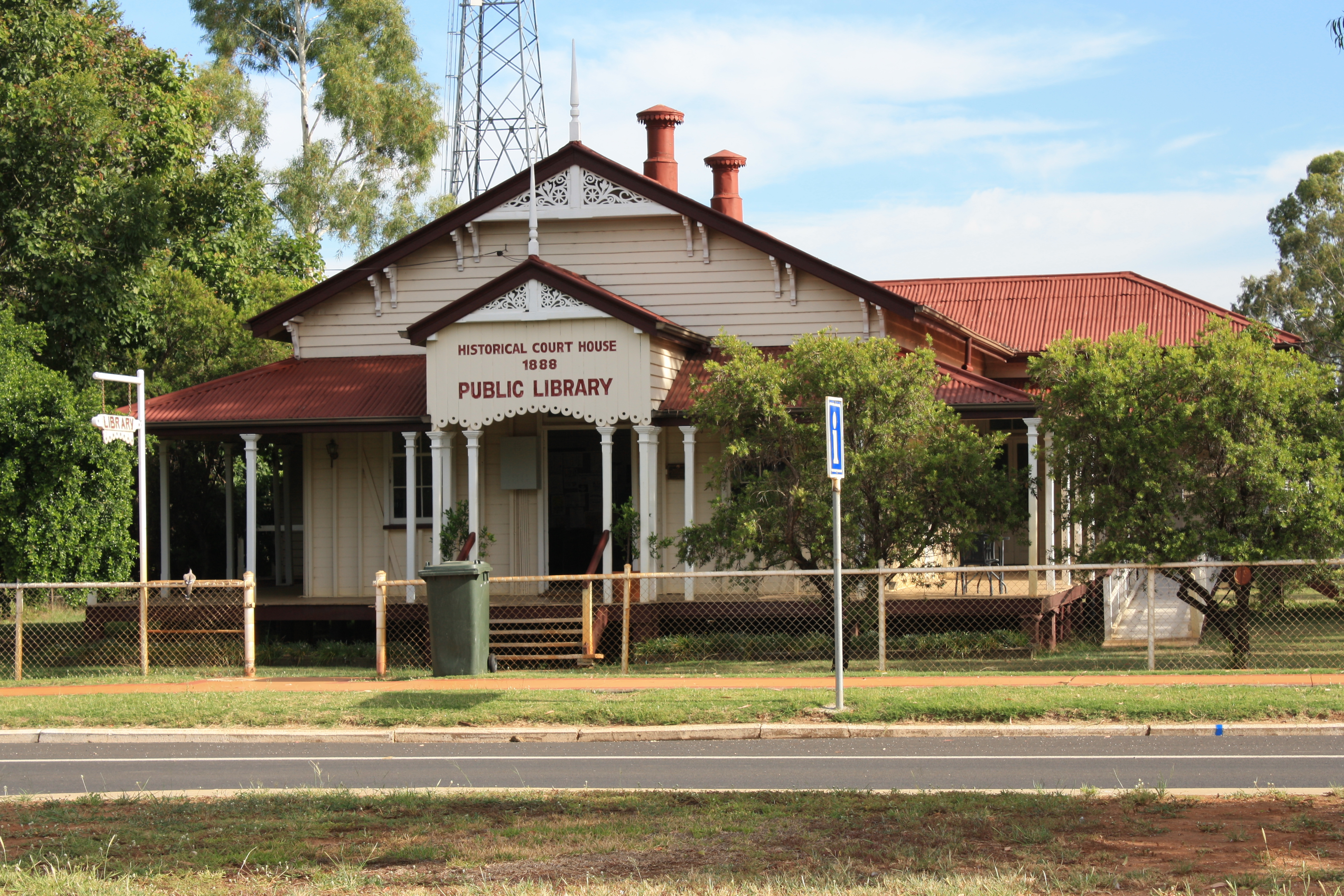
Tambo Public Library, previously Tambo Courthouse. Built in 1888

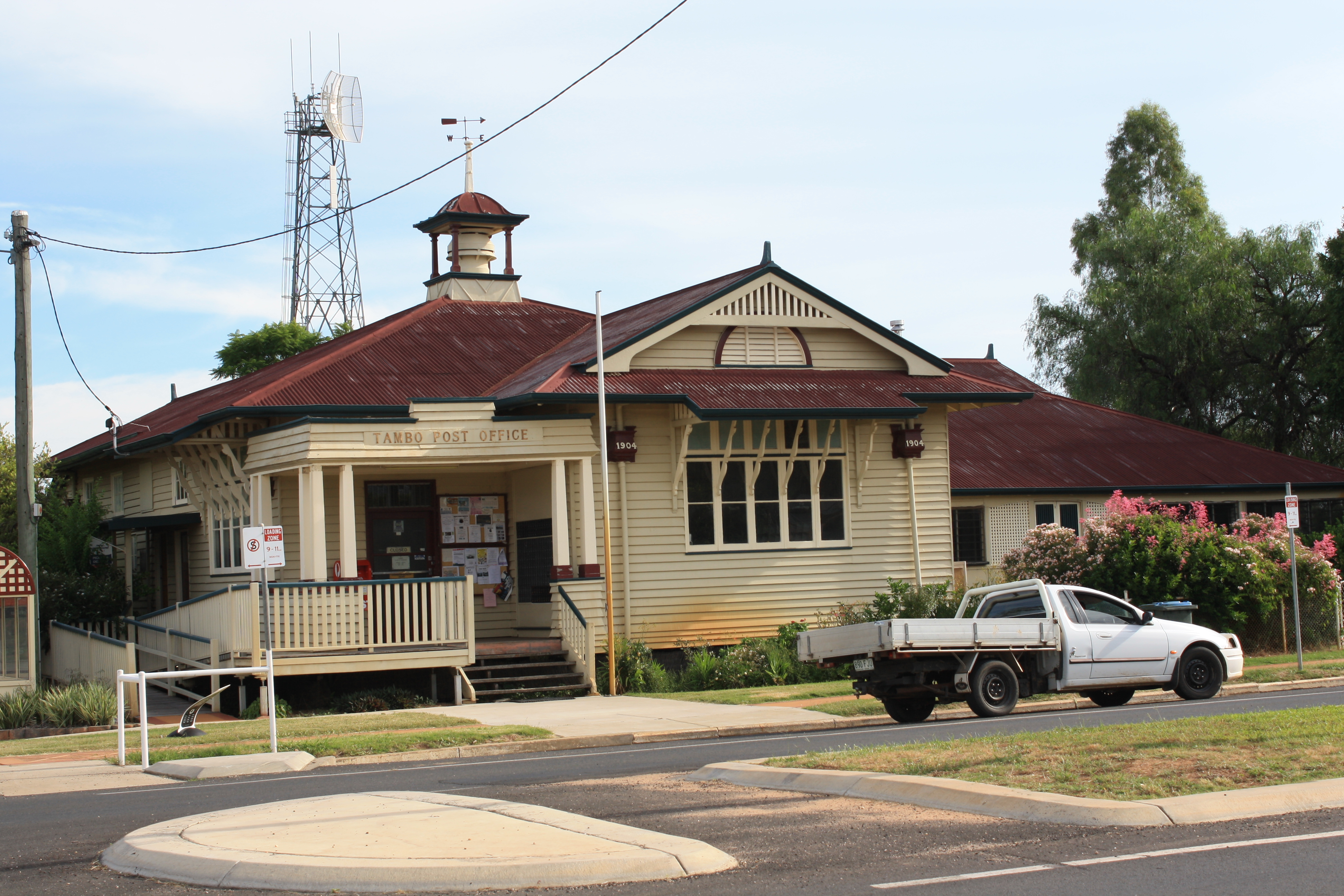
Tambo Post Office, built 1904

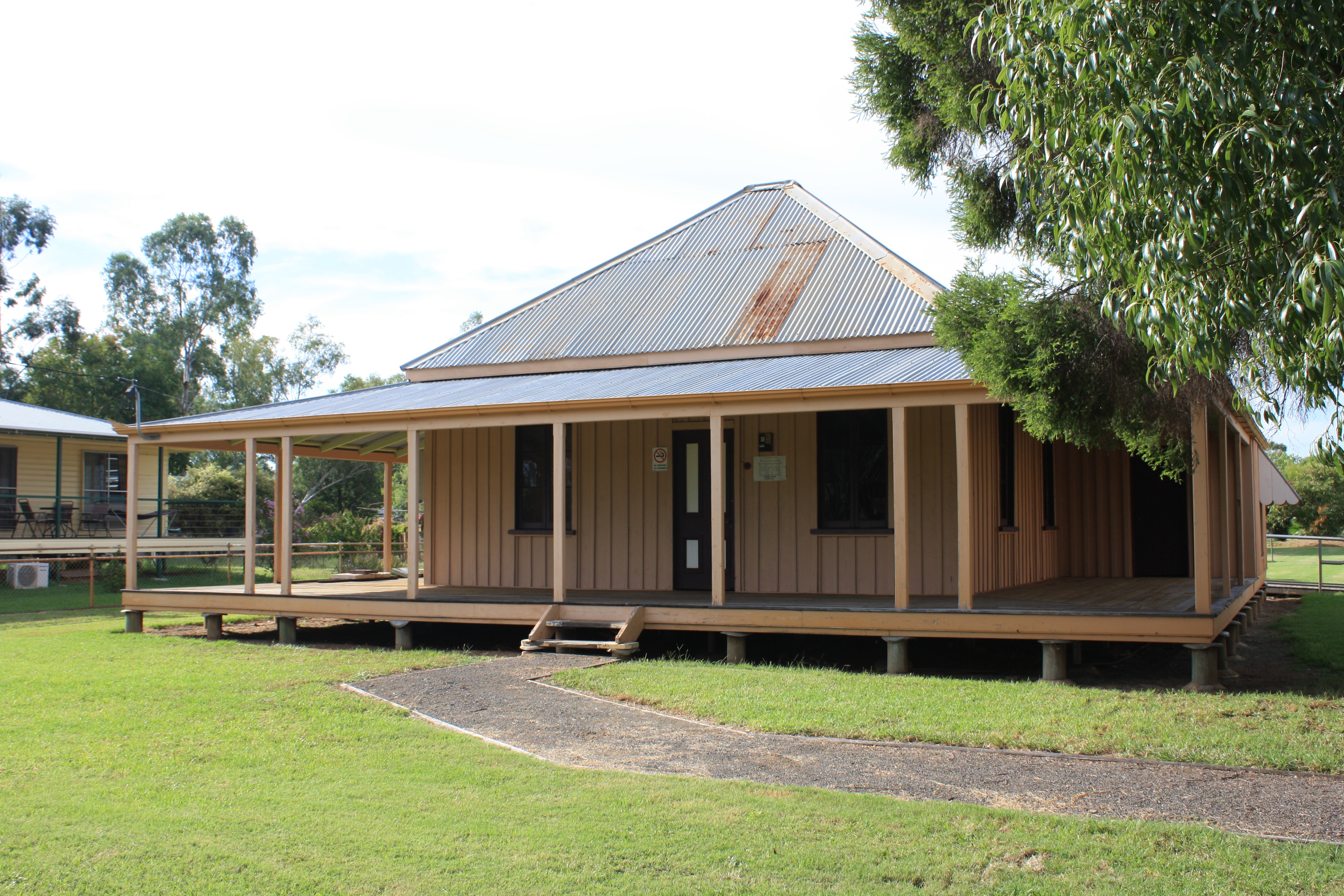
Tambo Post and Telegraph Office. Built 1876

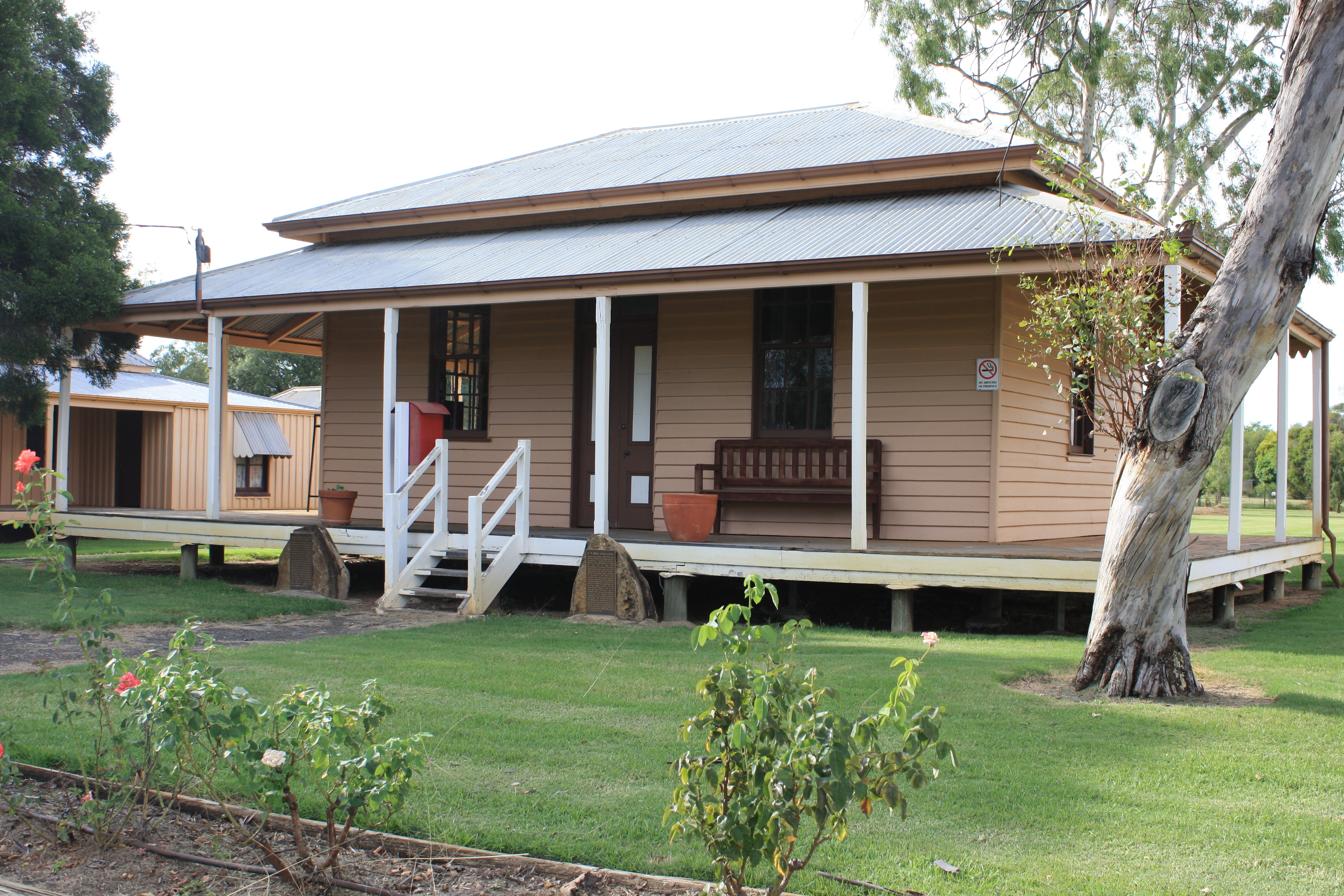
Tambo Electronic Telegraph Office. Built 1885

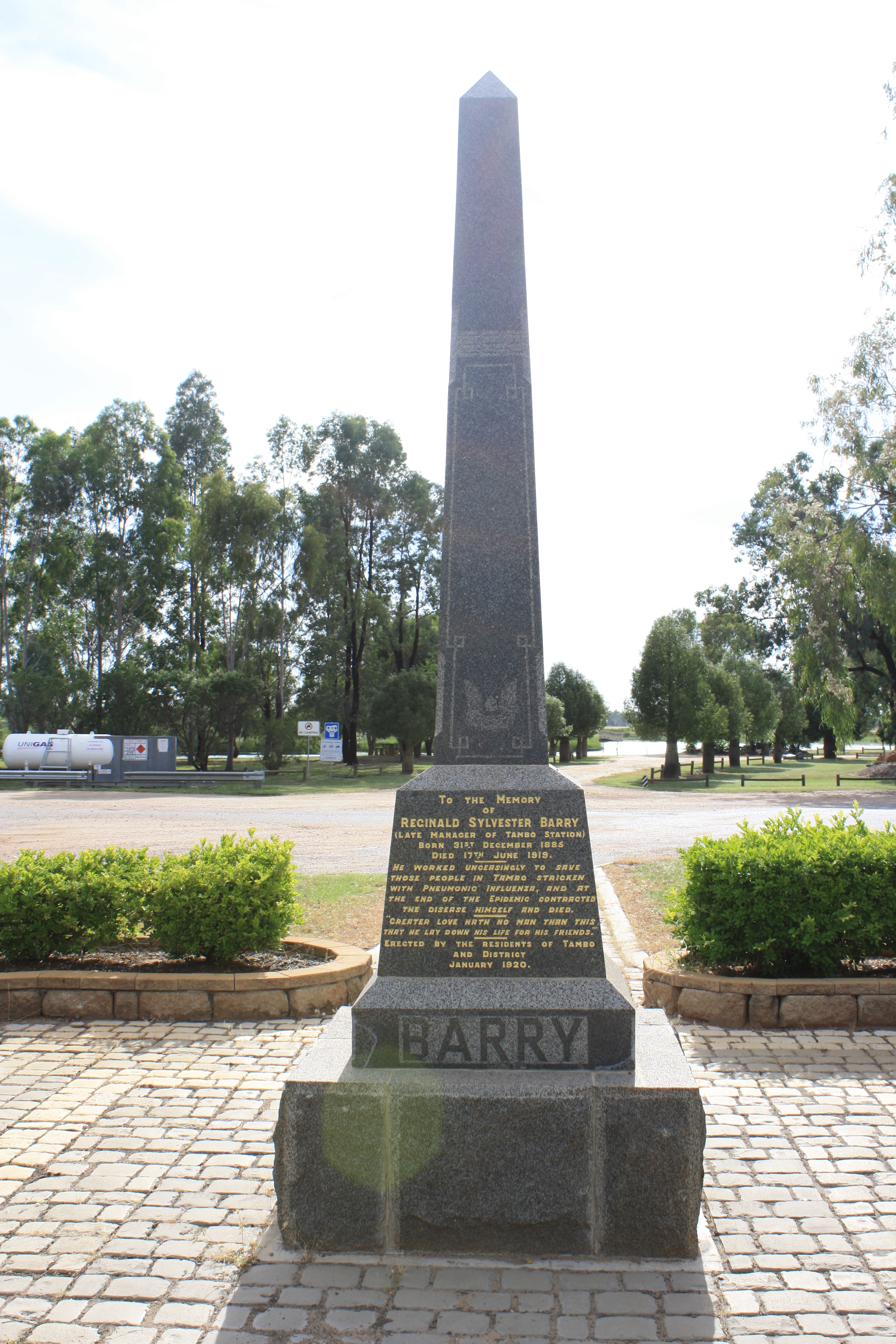
Reg Barry's Memorial

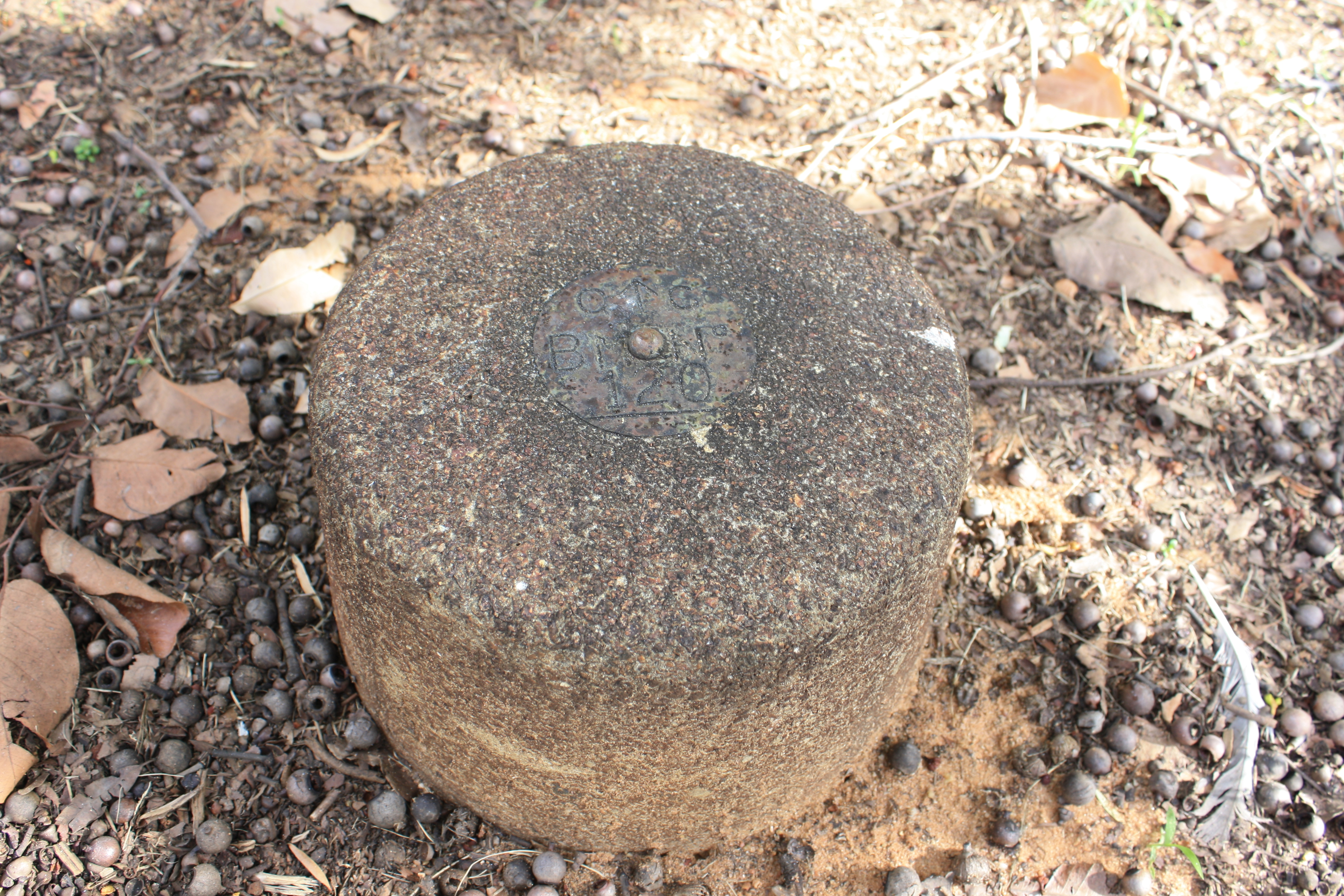
Tambo Survey Marker

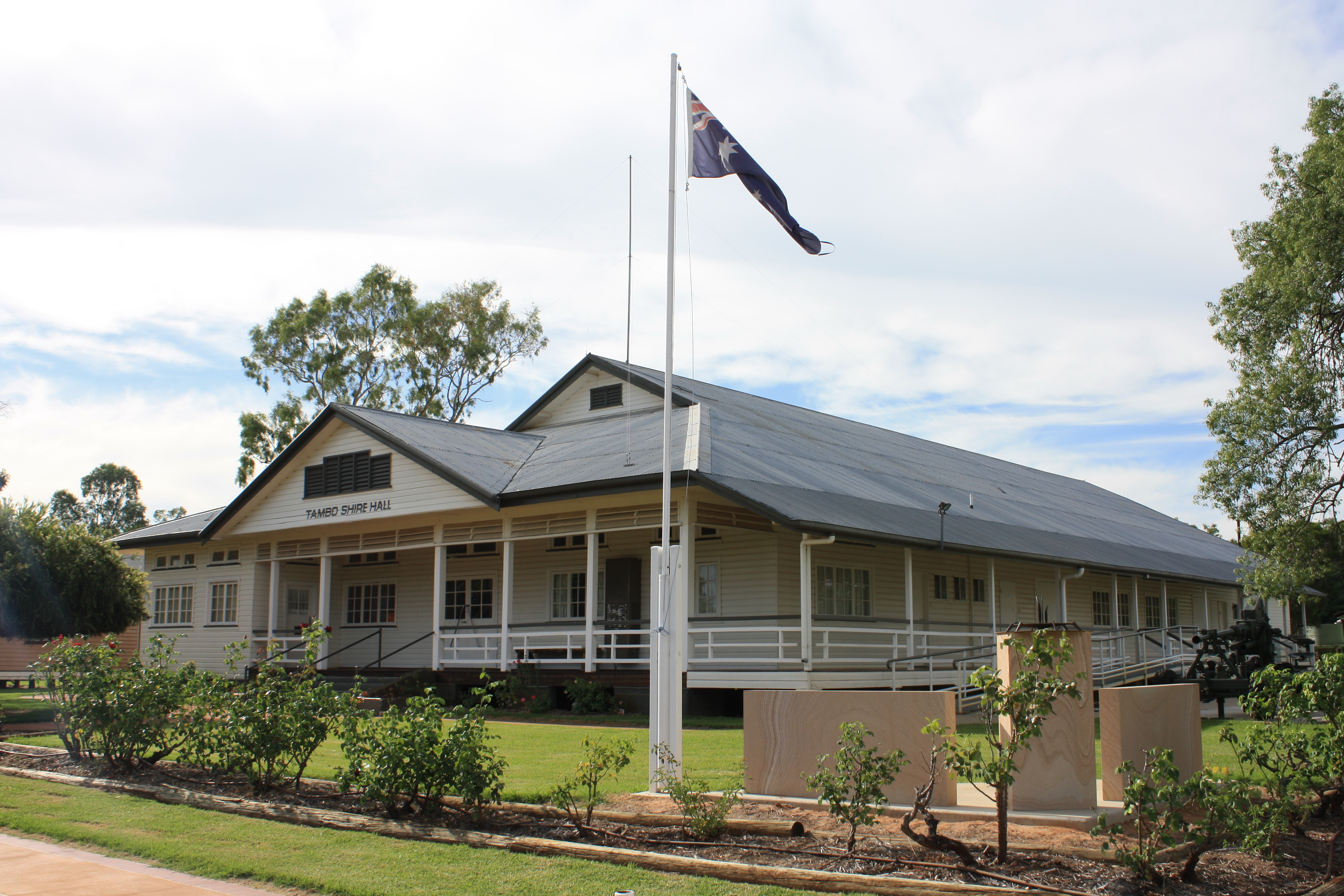
Tambo Shire Hall

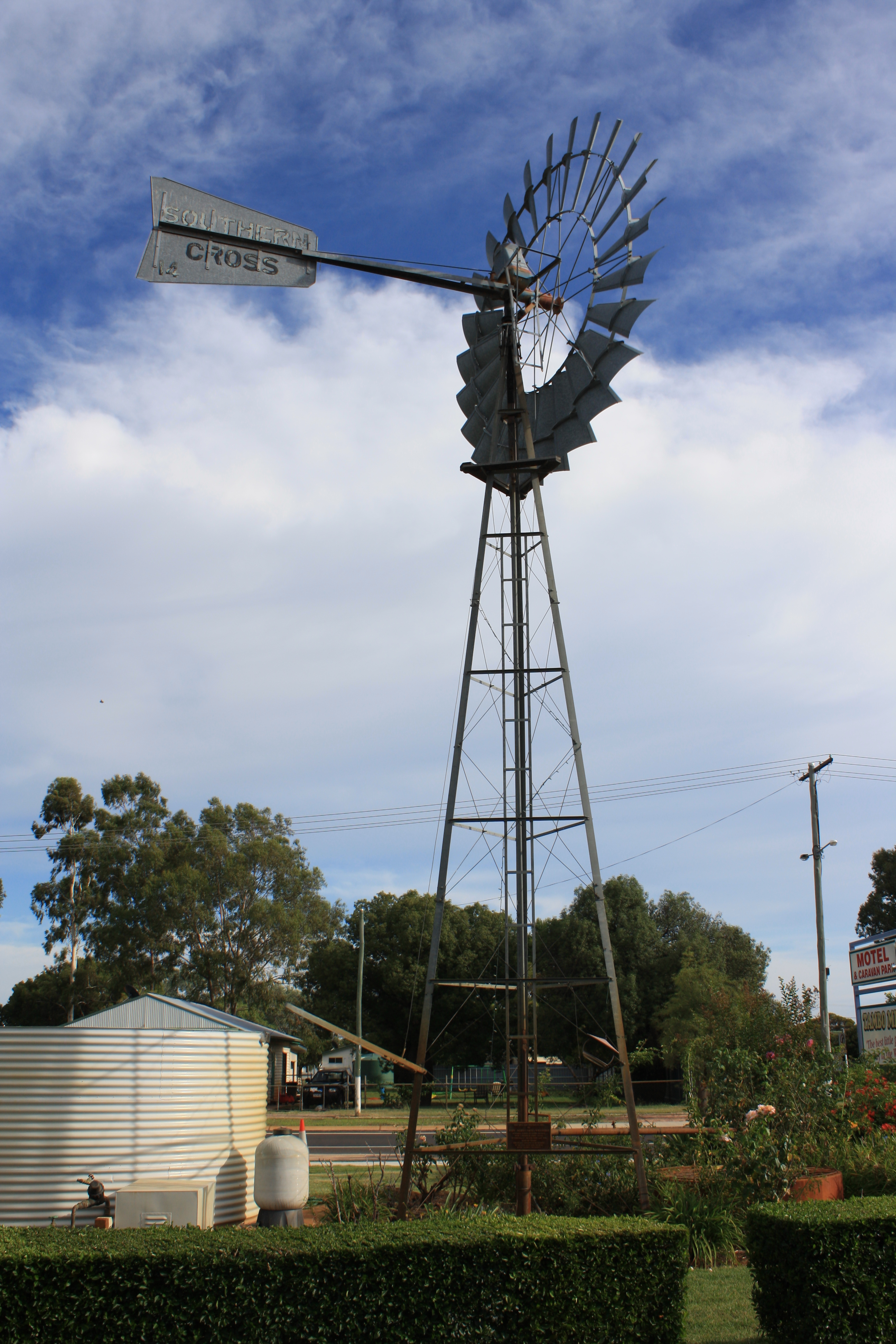
Tambo Windmill

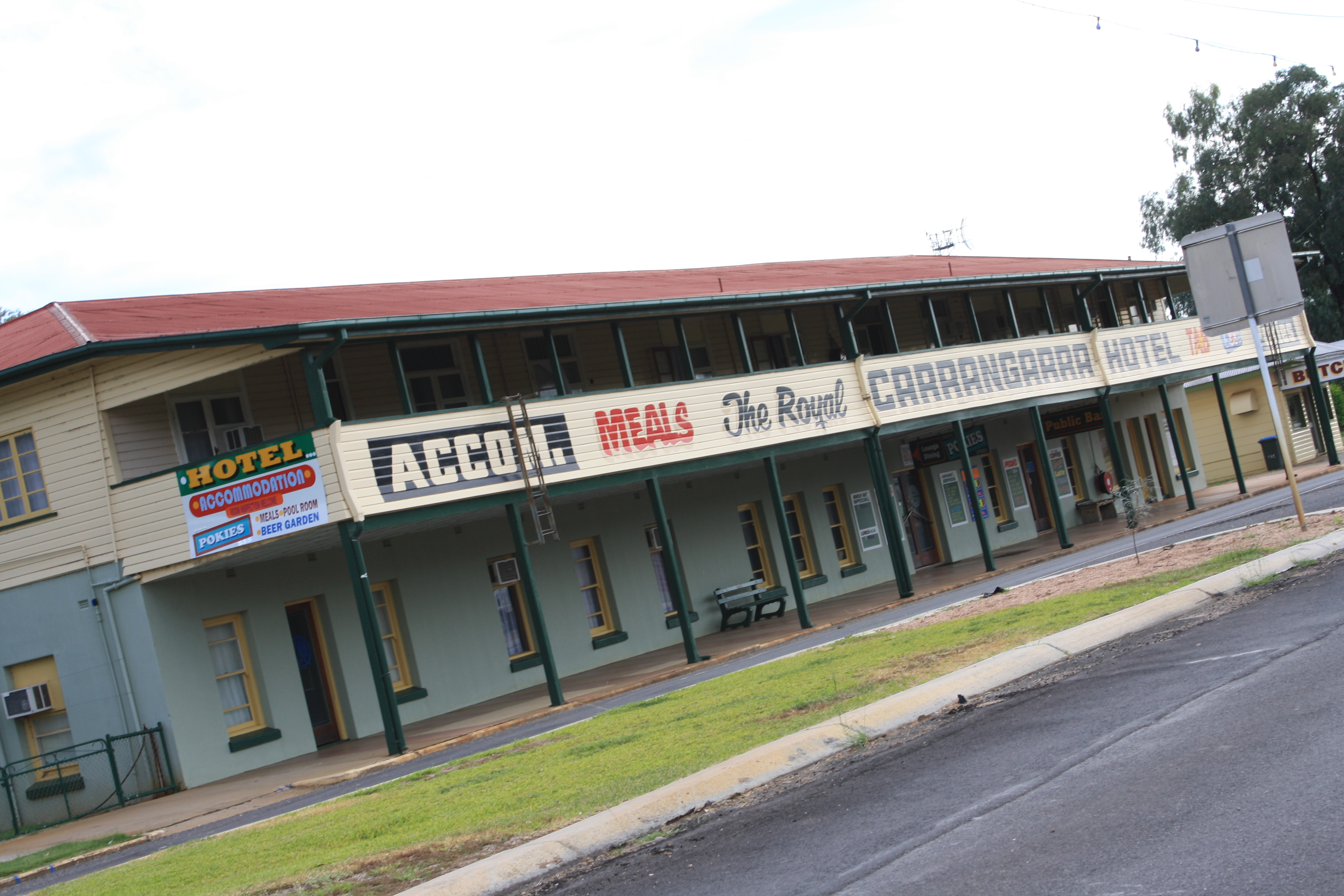
Royal Carrangarra Hotel

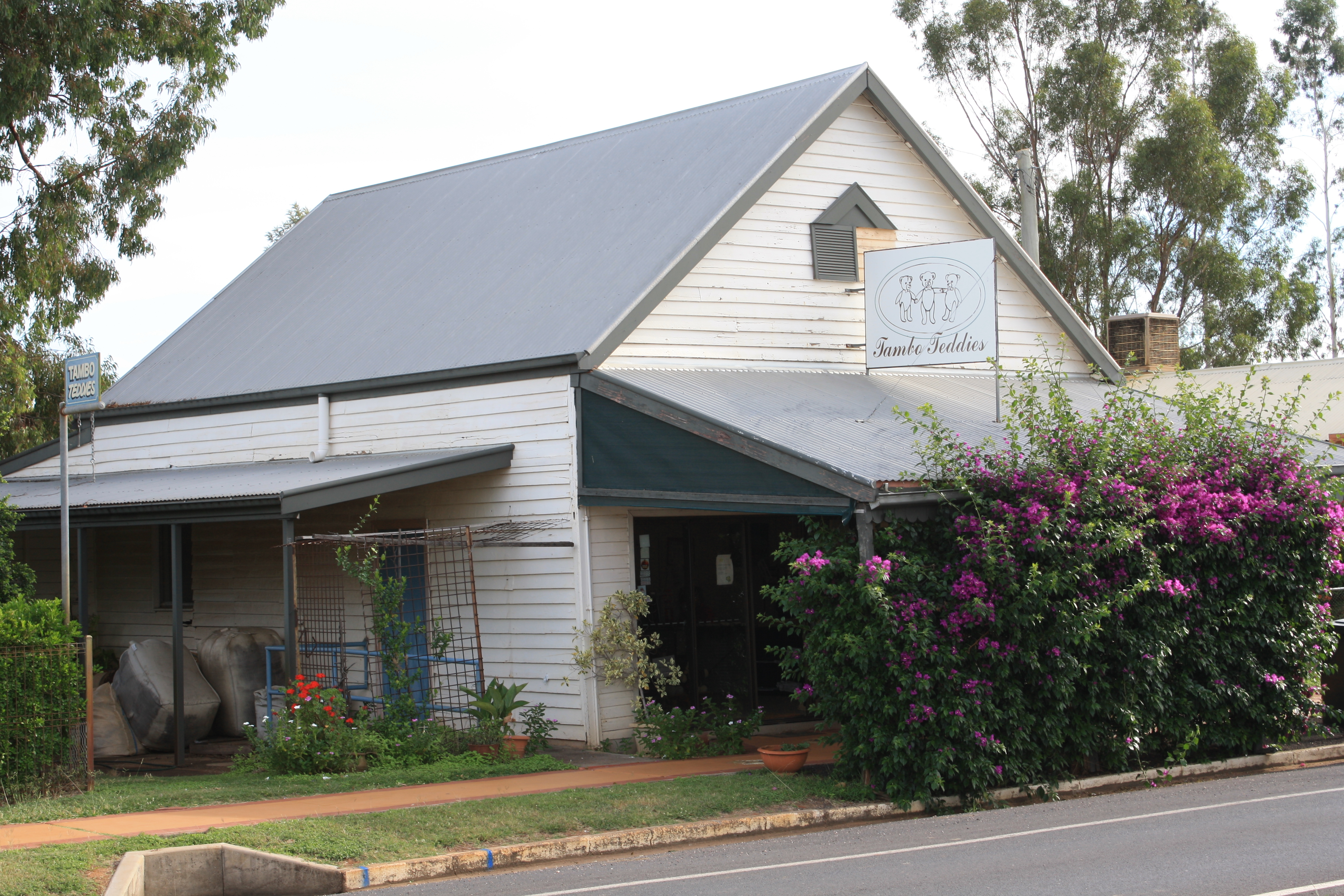
Tambo Teddies Workshop

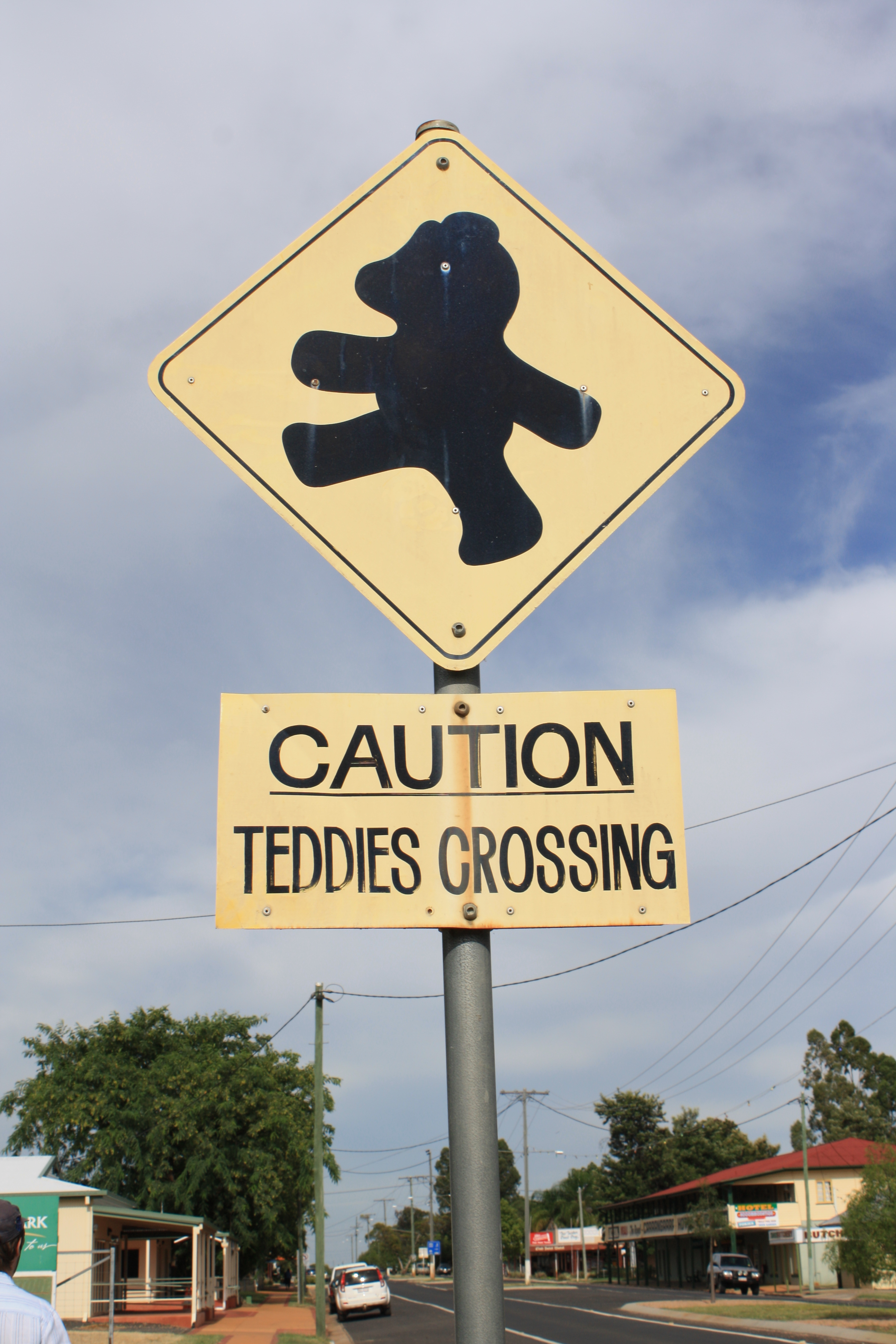
Teddy Crossing Tambo

== Bibliography ==
- L'Estrange, Jan (1996). Belle of the Barcoo: Tambo – genesis of Queensland's Central West. Harrison Printing. ISBN 0646288938.
