= Blackall, Queensland =

Blackall
- Town
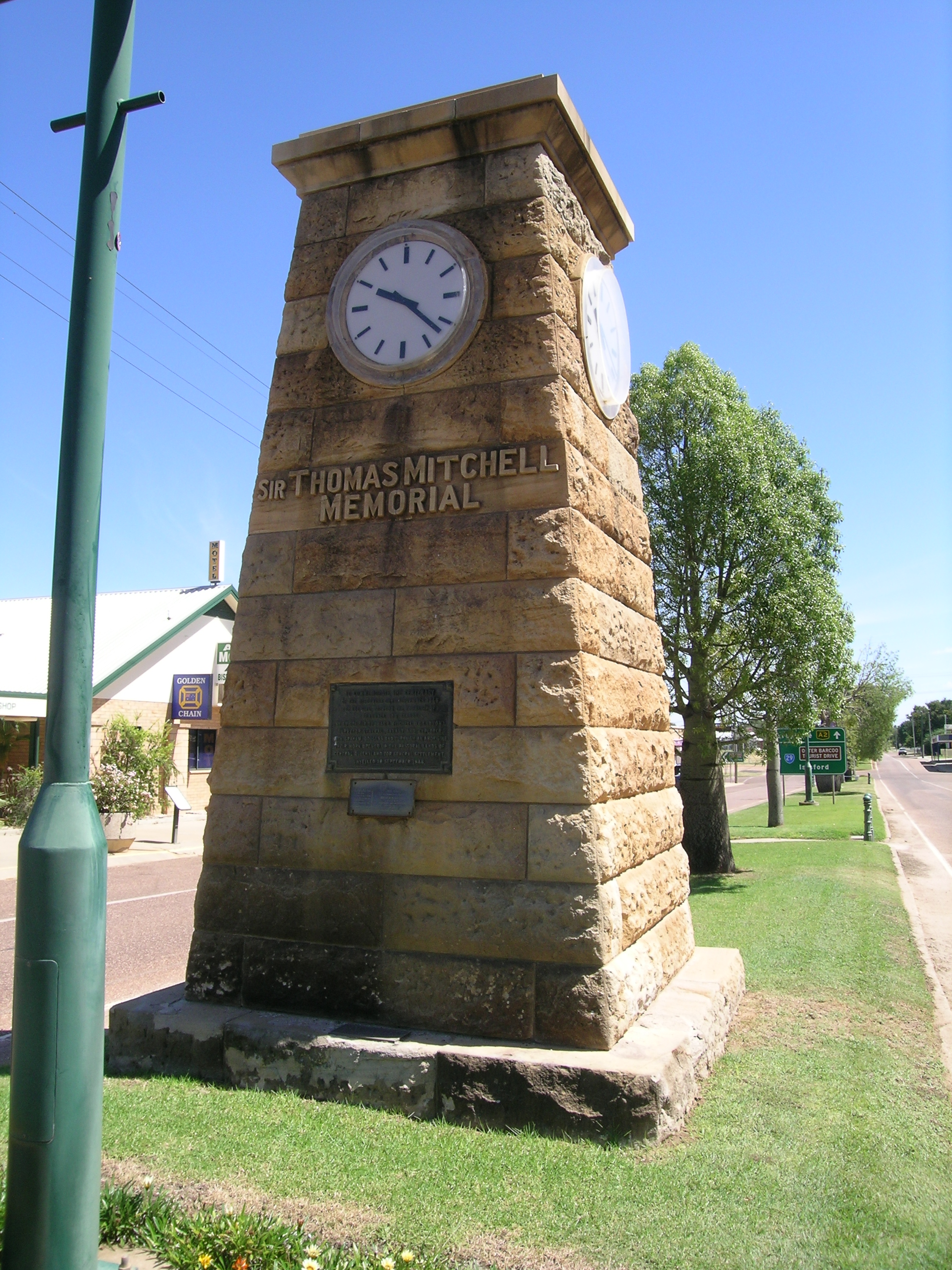
- Memorial to Sir Thomas Mitchell

- Interactive map of Blackall
- Coordinates: 24.4245°S 145.4658°E
- Country: Australia
- State: Queensland
- LGA: Blackall-Tambo Region
- Location: 102 km (63 mi) NW of Tambo; 214 km (133 mi) SE of Longreach; 488 km (303 mi) NW of Roma; 615 km (382 mi) W of Rockhampton; 964 km (599 mi) NW of Brisbane
- Established: 1868

Government
  - State electorate: Gregory
  - Federal division: Flynn

Area
  - Total: 16,556.6 km^{2} (6,392.5 sq mi)
- Elevation: 284 m (932 ft)

Population
  - Total: 1,365 (2021 census)
  - Density: 0.082444/km^{2} (0.21353/sq mi)
- Time zone: UTC+10:00 (AEST)
- Postcode: 4472
- Mean max temp: 30.2 °C (86.4 °F)
- Mean min temp: 15.4 °C (59.7 °F)
- Annual rainfall: 533.3 mm (21.00 in)
Localities around Blackall
Ilfracombe	Barcaldine; Jericho	Alpha; Windeyer
Isisford	Blackall	Mount Enniskillen; Macfarlane
Adavale	Langlo; Scrubby Creek	Lumeah; Minnie Downs

Blackall is a rural town and locality in the Blackall-Tambo Region, Queensland, Australia. The town is the service centre for the Blackall-Tambo Region. The dominant industry in the area is grazing with over 70 homesteads in the locality (as at 2020). In the 2021 census, the locality of Blackall had a population of 1,365 people.

Yalleroi is another town in the north of the locality (24.0680°S 145.7591°E).

== Geography ==
Blackall is in Central Western Queensland, approximately 960 kilometres (600 mi) by road from the state capital, Brisbane, 106 kilometres (66 mi) south of Barcaldine and 302 kilometres (188 mi) north of Charleville. The town is situated on the Barcoo River and Landsborough Highway (Matilda Way). Blackall–Jericho Road runs north-east from the town to the locality of Jericho. Isisford–Blackall Road enters from the locality of Isisford to the west.

The locality contains numerous mountains, including:

- Battery Knob (24.7550°S 144.7917°E) 431 metres (1,414 ft)
- Carlton Hill (24.9111°S 145.7253°E) 465 metres (1,526 ft)
- Cory Peak (25.1645°S 145.1564°E) 449 metres (1,473 ft)
- Flat Top (24.9896°S 145.0617°E)
- Joey Peak (25.1550°S 145.1211°E) 417 metres (1,368 ft)
- Lorne Mountain (24.9975°S 145.1810°E) 401 metres (1,316 ft)
- Mount Battery (24.7634°S 144.7920°E) 434 metres (1,424 ft)
- Mount Calder (24.9655°S 145.0638°E) 383 metres (1,257 ft)
- Mount Conebreak (25.1621°S 145.1965°E) 436 metres (1,430 ft)
- Mount Cullen (24.9368°S 144.9021°E) 400 metres (1,300 ft)
- Mount Harden (24.8665°S 144.8782°E)
- Mount Mistake (24.9822°S 144.9911°E)
- Mount Northampton (24.4884°S 146.0585°E) 515 metres (1,690 ft)
- Mount Sentinel (24.6730°S 144.7353°E) 431 metres (1,414 ft)
- Mount Watson (24.9391°S 145.0549°E)
- Mountain Red (24.9793°S 145.1013°E)
- One Stone Hill (25.2591°S 145.1063°E) 401 metres (1,316 ft)
- One Tree Hill (24.8330°S 144.8532°E)
- Scrubby Mountain (24.9221°S 144.8946°E)
- The Cone (25.3010°S 145.3368°E) 447 metres (1,467 ft)
- The Nob (24.4505°S 145.0251°E) 275 metres (902 ft)

== History ==
Bidjara (also known as Bidyara, Pitjara, and Peechara) is an Australian Aboriginal language spoken by the Bidjara people. The Bidjara language region includes the local government area of the Shire of Murweh, particularly the towns of Charleville, Augathella and Blackall as well as the properties of Nive Downs and Mount Tabor.

Kuungkari (also known as Kungkari and Koonkerri) is a language of Western Queensland. The Kuungkari language region includes the landscape within the local government boundaries of Longreach Region and Blackall-Tambo Region.

Gungabula (also known as Kongabula and Khungabula) is an Australian Aboriginal language of the headwaters of the Dawson River in Central Queensland. The language region includes areas within the local government area of Maranoa Region, particularly the towns of Charleville, Augathella and Blackall and as well as the Carnarvon Range.

The region was explored in 1846 by explorer Sir Thomas Mitchell and his party. In 1856, Augustus Gregory passed through the area noting that the landscape was a vast plain lacking vegetation, in contrast to Mitchell's description of good country. Blackall was named by Surveyor Abraham H. May after Sir Samuel Blackall, the second Governor of Queensland. During the 1860s the town developed as a service centre for the surrounding pastoral properties. A survey of town allotments was conducted in 1868.

Barcoo Post Office opened on 1 April 1864. It was renamed Blackall in 1868.

Blackall State School opened on 10 September 1877. On 5 October 1964, the school was destroyed by fire, but was subsequently rebuilt.

On Tuesday 29 March 1881, following seven inches of rain, the Barcoo River burst through the town embankment, completely washing away the stonework of the dam. On Wednesday 30 March, the still-rising river flooded the town's main street and many people in the town's lower-lying areas were forced to evacuate as their homes became fully submerged.

Blackall was one of the first Queensland towns to sink an artesian bore in 1885. It supplies the town with water from the Great Artesian Basin. The water temperature is 58 degrees Celsius. There is an artesian spa bath at the aquatic centre and locally produced soft drinks are made from the artesian water.

The first Methodist church in Blackall opened on Easter Sunday 13 April 1884. On Thursday 23 January 1913 a new Methodist church opened. The present church building (now the Blackall Uniting Church) was established c. 1956–1958.

Blackall claims to be the home of the original Black Stump, which marks the original Astro Station established in 1887. Places west of this point are said to be 'beyond the black stump'. The Black Stump was moved from its original location to make it more accessible to tourists, and can now be found on the boundary of the Blackall State School grounds, Thistle Street, Blackall. Blackall has many attractions for public use and entertainment, including the Blackall showground, the local pool and the historic Blackall Woolscour.

In December 1890 the Australian Labour Federation's executive met in Blackall to draw up plans for a proper organisational structure for the Labour Party. Four years earlier, in December 1886, the first meeting of the first shearers' union, which later became the Australian Labor Party, took place in Blackall. This is commemorated by the Australian Labor Federation Memorial in Short Street.

In Australian folklore, the best known citizen of the town was the sheep shearer Jack Howe. In 1892, he shore a total of 321 sheep at Alice Downs station in 7 hours and 40 minutes, a record for hand shearing that still stands, and was only broken by a shearer using a machine driven handpiece in 1950.

The Blackall and Yaraka railway line branched off from the Central Western railway at Jericho. The line opened to Blackall in 1908 and ran all the way to Yaraka. the Jericho – Yaraka branch line closed on 14 October 2005 and has since been dismantled. Former stations on the line (now all abandoned) within the locality were (from Jericho heading south):

- Ballast railway siding (23.8267°S 145.9310°E)
- Lancevale railway station (23.9137°S 145.8841°E)
- Yalleroi railway station (24.0675°S 145.7563°E)
- Glenusk railway station (24.2543°S 145.6006°E)
- Sandy Creek railway siding (24.3124°S 145.5519°E)
- Blackall Wool Scour railway siding (24.3947°S 145.4880°E)
- Blackall railway station (24.4185°S 145.4646°E)
- Glenstuart railway station (24.4809°S 145.2027°E)
- Malvernton railway station (24.5051°S 145.1198°E)
- Benlidi railway station (24.5567°S 144.8676°E)
- Mekaree railway station (24.6011°S 144.7128°E)

St Joseph's Catholic Primary School was established in 1917 by the Sisters of St Joseph. The opening ceremonies were conducted on Saturday 21 July 1917 by Archbishop James Duhig.

The Blackall War Memorial commemorates those soldiers who died in World War I. The memorial was dedicated on 25 April (Anzac Day) 1927 by James Charles Minnis (former mayor of Blackall and a former soldier). The honour roll of those who died in World War II was added later.

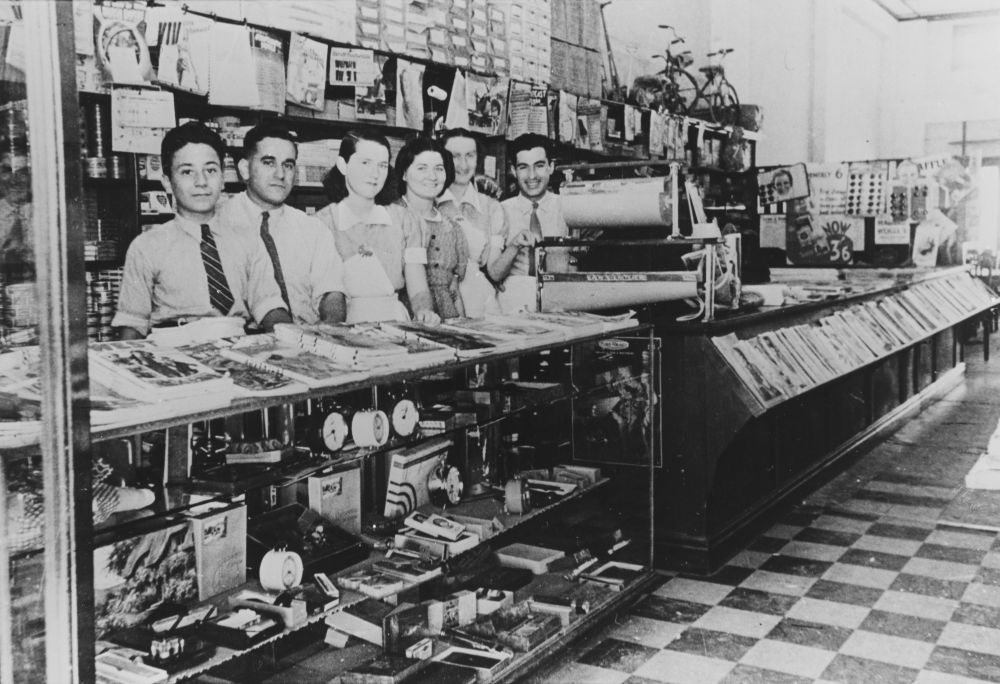
A thriving Greek cafe in the 1930s in Blackall, Queensland

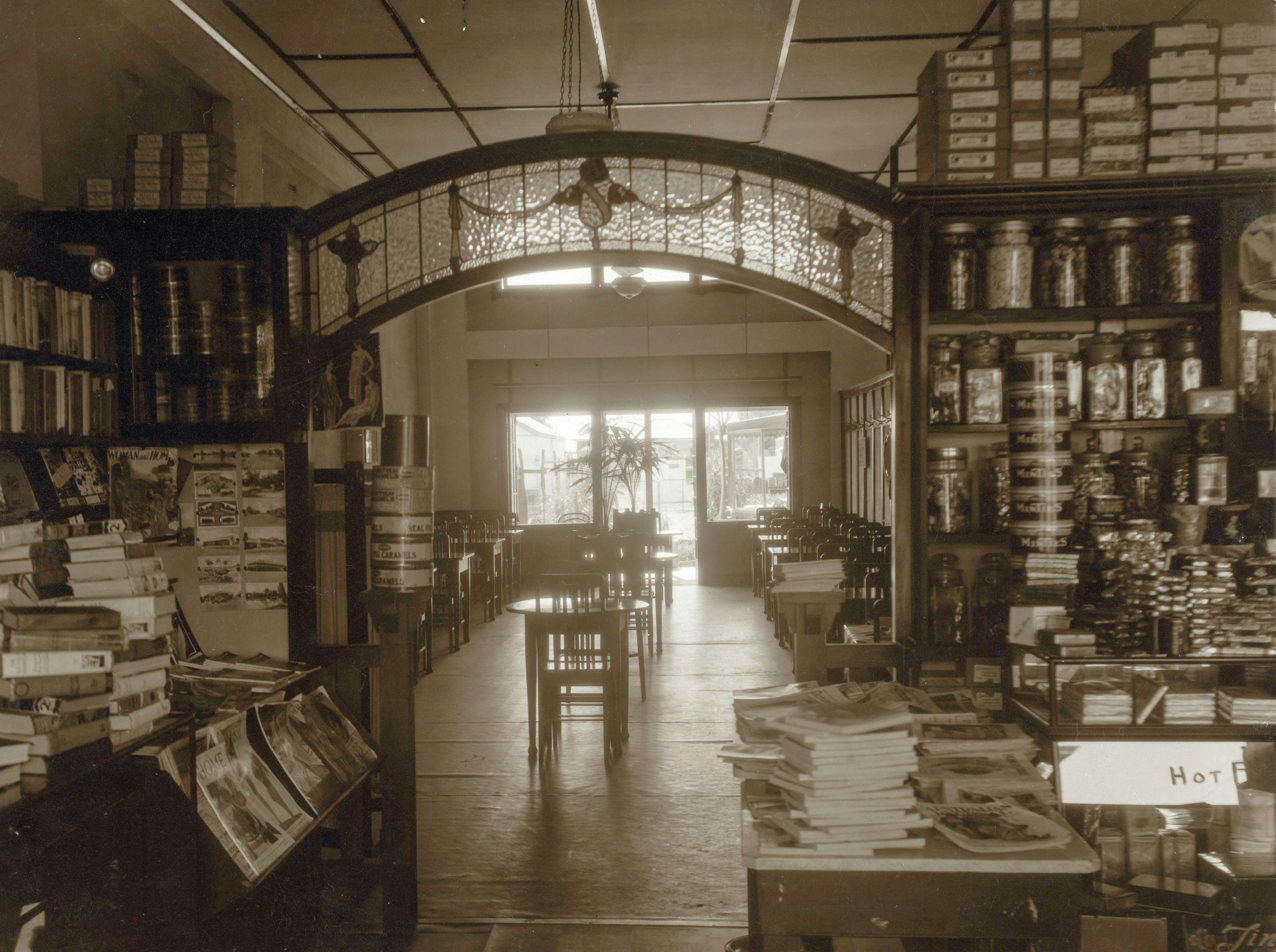
Interior view of the Logos Brother's Central Cafe at Blackall, Queensland

According to information published by the Blackall Shire Council, the Cominos opened a café in the 1920s in Shamrock Street, Blackall which they called the Central. A few years later it was taken over by the Logos Brothers who installed a newsagency at one side. The Queensland Country Women's Association met at the cafe to farewell their secretary Mrs R.A.G. Malcolm in September 1929.

Blackall Ambulance commenced operations in November 1923 led by Superintendent W.J. King (from Rockhampton). On 15 October 1927 the first permanent building was officially opened by the Mick Kirwan (the Queensland Minister for Public Works) assisted by Frank Bulcock, the local member of the Legislative Assembly of Queensland for Barcoo. On 14 April 1984 the current building in Coronation Drive was officially opened by Roy Hauff.

Blackall Methodist Church – This stone was set by – Mr F J Green – To the memory of the – Pioneers of the District – and dedicated to the – Glory of God – by the Rev S J R Murr L Th – on 8 February 1958 – The Rev J L Savage, Minister.

A plaque records: (This has discrepancies with the original foundation stone) Blackall Methodist Church – This stone was set by – Mr F J Green – To the memory of the – Pioneers of the District – and dedicated to the – Glory of God – by the Rev S J Murr Lth – on 8 February 1956 – The Rev J L Savage, Minister.

Blackall's population was more than 3,000 in 1965. A declining population has coincided with the decline in the wool industry in the district.

The new Blackall Hospital opened on 25 November 2020. It cost $20.11 million.

== Demographics ==
In the 2011 census, the locality of Blackall had a population of 1,588 people.

In the 2016 census, the locality of Blackall had a population of 1,416 people.

In the 2021 census, the locality of Blackall had a population of 1,365 people.

== Heritage listings ==
Blackall has a number of heritage-listed sites, including:

- Blackall Masonic Temple, Hawthorn Street (24.4271°S 145.4679°E)
- Blackall Woolscour, 4 kilometres (2.5 mi) northeast of Blackall (24.3949°S 145.4878°E)

== Education ==
Blackall State School is a government primary and secondary (Prep to Year 12) school for boys and girls at the corner of Hawthorne Street and Shamrock Street (24.4256°S 145.4696°E). In 2012, there were 152 students enrolled with 14.5 teachers. In 2018, the school had an enrolment of 111 students with 13 teachers (11 full-time equivalent) and 17 non-teaching staff (10 full-time equivalent).

St Joseph's Catholic Primary School is a Catholic primary (Kindergarten to Year 6) school for boys and girls at 109 Thistle Street (24.4200°S 145.4597°E). In 2018, the school had an enrolment of 69 students with 7 teachers (5 full-time equivalent) and 4 non-teaching staff (2 full-time equivalent).

== Facilities ==
Blackall Police Station is at 139 Shamrock Street, access via Violet Street (24.4225°S 145.4610°E).

Blackall Fire Station is at 125 Shamrock Street (24.4234°S 145.4625°E).

Blackall Hospital is a public hospital at 31 Hospital Road (24.4229°S 145.4490°E). Prior to July 2014 it was known as the Black Stump Medical Centre.

Blackall Ambulance Station is at 4 Coronation Drive (24.4230°S 145.4634°E).

Blackall Cemetery is on Evora Road (24.4085°S 145.4744°E). Legendary shearer Jackie Howe is buried there.

== Amenities ==
Blackall has a showground, racecourse, bowling club and aquatic centre, cultural centre and an historical association.

The Blackall-Tambo Regional Council operates a public library at 108 Shamrock Street (24.4245°S 145.4650°E) with Internet access provided through a High-Speed ISDN Connection to Brisbane (powered through the National Broadband Network).

Blackall Cultural Centre is on the south-east corner of Shamrock Street and Hawthorne Street (24.4261°S 145.4684°E).

The Blackall branch of the Queensland Country Women's Association has its rooms at 14 Clematis Street (24.4251°S 145.4654°E).

Blackall Uniting Church is at 28 Clematis Street (24.4233°S 145.4661°E).

The Blackall Golf Club has an 18-hole golf course at 192 Shamrock Street (24.42172°S 145.45276°E).

== Media ==
Blackall is serviced by a number of radio stations:

- West FM (Resonate Radio) – 95.1 FM
- Classic Hits 4LG (Resonate Radio) – 100.7 FM
- ABC Radio National – 107.9 FM

The Australian Broadcasting Corporation transmits ABC Television and its sister channels ABC Kids/ABC TV Plus, ABC Me and ABC News to Blackall through its Blackall relay station, ABBLQ

The Seven Network and its sister stations 7Two, 7Mate and 7Flix transmit to Blackall through its regional area affiliate, ITQ

The Nine Network and its sister channels 9Gem, 9Go! and 9Rush transmit to Blackall through its regional area affiliate, Imparja Television

Network Ten and its sister channels 10 BOLD, 10 Peach and 10 Shake transmit to Blackall through its regional area affiliate, CDT

The Special Broadcasting Service and its sister channels SBS Viceland, SBS World Movies and SBS Food also transmit to Blackall

== Attractions ==
The Black Stump is in Thistle Street behind the Blackall State School (24.4238°S 145.4697°E).

The Major Mitchell Memorial is in the centre of Shamrock Street (opposite Short Street, 24.4242°S 145.4644°E). It commemorates Thomas Mitchell's exploration of the district.

The Australian Labor Federation Memorial is at the intersection of Shamrock Street and Short Street (24.4244°S 145.4646°E). It commemorates the meeting of shearers that led to the foundation of the Australian Labor Party.

Blackall Memorial Park is on the south-east corner of Shamrock Street and Hawthorne Street (24.4258°S 145.4685°E) in front of the Blackall Cultural Centre. Blackall War Memorial and other memorials and honour rolls are located either within the park or within the cultural centre.

Blackall Woolscour is in Evora Road (24.3949°S 145.4878°E). Guided tours are available.

== Transport ==
Blackall Airport is on Aerodrome Road (24.4280°S 145.4273°E). QantasLink has services connecting the town to Longreach and Brisbane.

Blackall is also a timetabled meal stop for Bus Queensland's long-distance bus services:

- BQ201 (Brisbane – Mount Isa)
- BQ202 (Mount Isa – Brisbane)

== Climate ==
Blackall experiences a hot semi-arid climate (Köppen: BSh), with a highly erratic wet season from December and March and a lengthy dry season from April and November, with cooler nights. Average maxima vary from 22.3 °C (72.1 °F) in July to 36.0 °C (96.8 °F) in December and January. Average annual rainfall is low, 526.7 mm (20.74 in), occurring within 40.2 rainfall days, and is concentrated in the summer. The town is very sunny, averaging 192.5 clear days and only 64.5 cloudy days annually. Extreme temperatures have ranged from −2.0 °C (28.4 °F) on 27 July 1966 to 44.6 °C (112.3 °F) on 28 January 1990 and 13 December 1979.

Climate data for Blackall (24º25'12"S, 145º28'12"E, 284 m AMSL) (1957-2001 normals and extremes, rainfall 1880-2024)
Month	Jan	Feb	Mar	Apr	May	Jun	Jul	Aug	Sep	Oct	Nov	Dec	Year
Record high °C (°F)	44.6 (112.3)	43.9 (111.0)	41.8 (107.2)	37.3 (99.1)	35.0 (95.0)	32.8 (91.0)	31.3 (88.3)	35.1 (95.2)	38.4 (101.1)	41.2 (106.2)	44.0 (111.2)	44.6 (112.3)	44.6 (112.3)
Mean daily maximum °C (°F)	36.0 (96.8)	35.1 (95.2)	33.7 (92.7)	30.3 (86.5)	25.8 (78.4)	22.7 (72.9)	22.3 (72.1)	24.6 (76.3)	28.5 (83.3)	32.2 (90.0)	34.7 (94.5)	36.0 (96.8)	30.2 (86.3)
Mean daily minimum °C (°F)	22.4 (72.3)	22.0 (71.6)	19.9 (67.8)	16.1 (61.0)	11.8 (53.2)	8.0 (46.4)	6.9 (44.4)	8.4 (47.1)	12.1 (53.8)	16.5 (61.7)	19.5 (67.1)	21.4 (70.5)	15.4 (59.7)
Record low °C (°F)	12.9 (55.2)	12.4 (54.3)	10.1 (50.2)	4.1 (39.4)	0.1 (32.2)	−0.7 (30.7)	−2.0 (28.4)	−1.8 (28.8)	1.4 (34.5)	3.0 (37.4)	8.2 (46.8)	10.7 (51.3)	−2.0 (28.4)
Average precipitation mm (inches)	83.0 (3.27)	80.9 (3.19)	63.6 (2.50)	36.3 (1.43)	32.2 (1.27)	25.8 (1.02)	24.5 (0.96)	16.4 (0.65)	19.2 (0.76)	33.1 (1.30)	43.7 (1.72)	67.8 (2.67)	526.7 (20.74)
Average precipitation days (≥ 1.0 mm)	5.7	5.2	4.2	2.4	2.4	2.1	2.1	1.7	1.9	3.3	4.1	5.1	40.2
Average afternoon relative humidity (%)	33	38	34	34	40	36	33	28	24	26	27	29	32
Average dew point °C (°F)	14.7 (58.5)	15.8 (60.4)	13.3 (55.9)	10.5 (50.9)	9.1 (48.4)	5.5 (41.9)	3.7 (38.7)	3.1 (37.6)	4.2 (39.6)	7.3 (45.1)	9.5 (49.1)	12.1 (53.8)	9.1 (48.3)
Source: Bureau of Meteorology (1957-2001 normals and extremes, rainfall 1880-2024)

== Notable people ==
- Ashley Adams – Paralympic shooter
- Bonny Barry – Politician
- Guy Kendall White – Pioneering experimentalist in low-temperature and solid-state physics, and cryogenics
- Jack "Jackie" Howe – Shearer
- Jacki MacDonald − Television and radio personality
- Fiona MacDonald – Television presenter
- Chris Nyst – Solicitor and crime fiction writer
- Edgar Towner – Recipient of the Victoria Cross

== Gallery ==
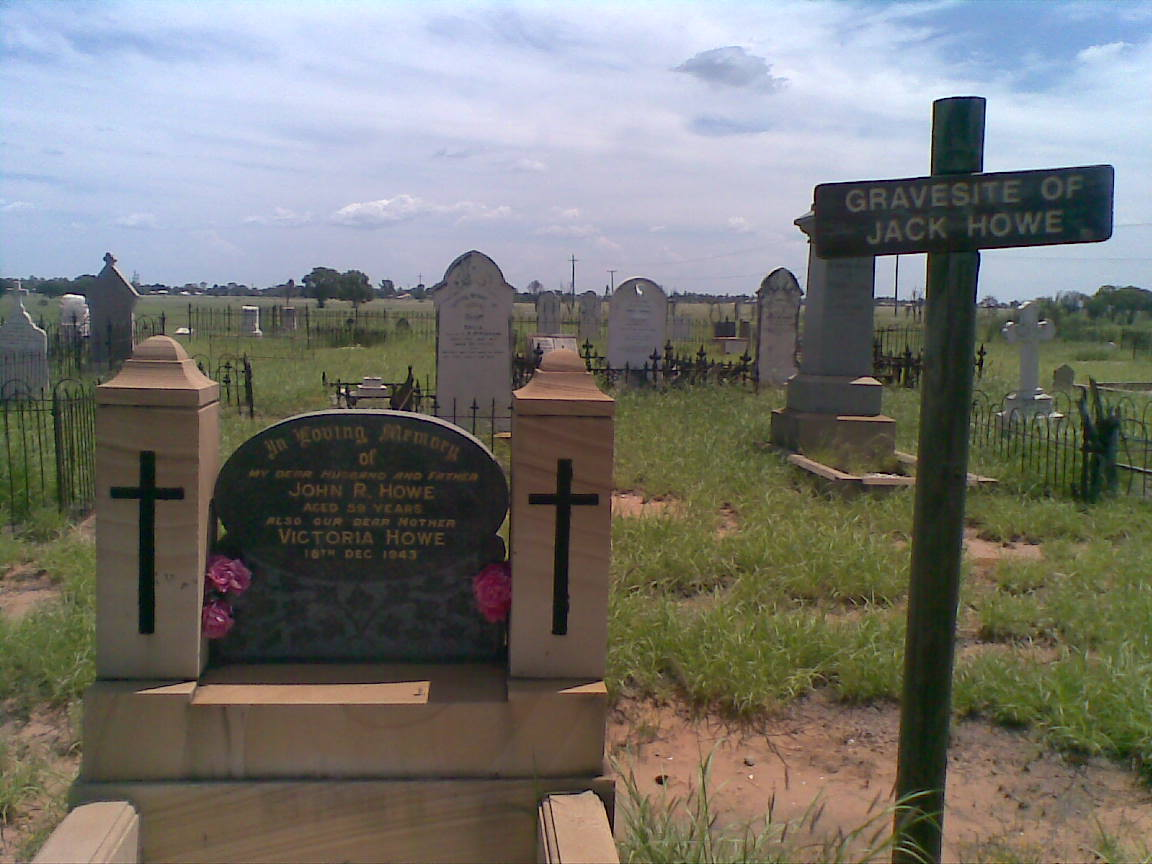
Jack Howe's gravesite in Blackall cemetery

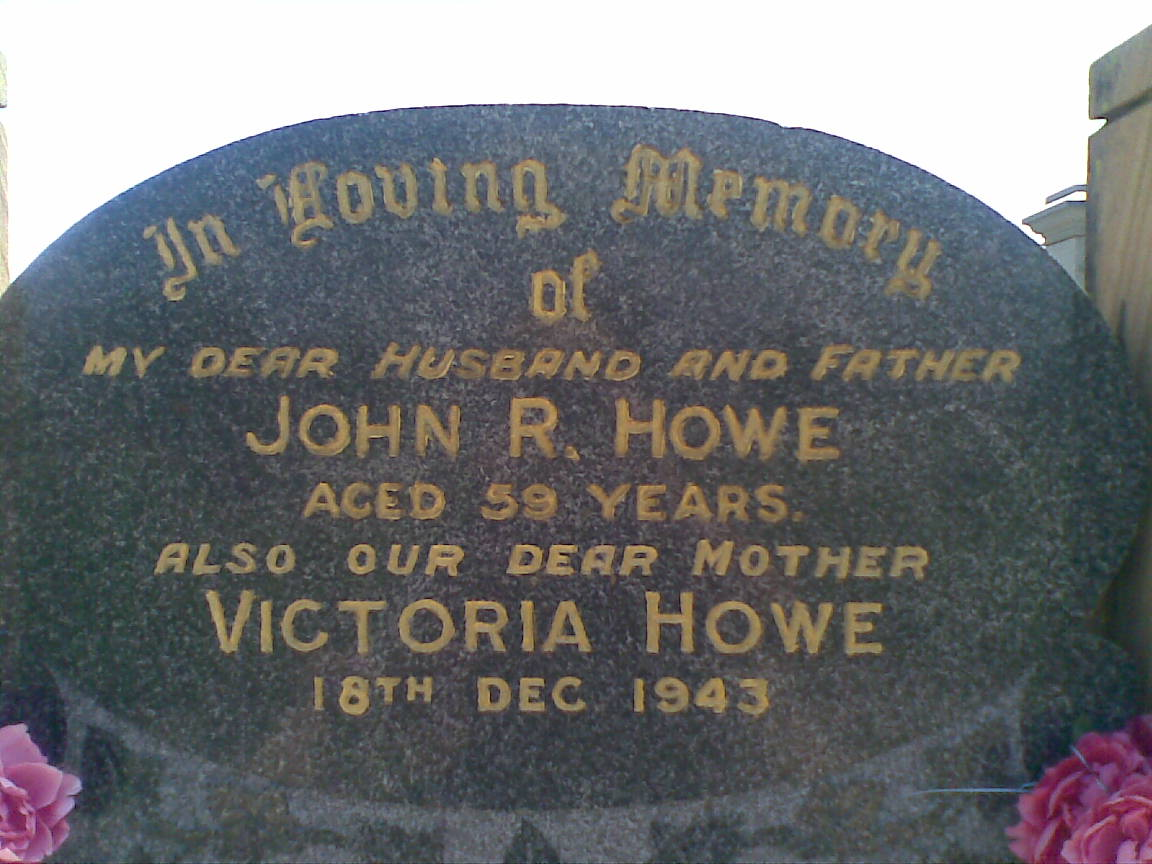
Gravestone memorial for Jack Howe in Blackall cemetery

== See also ==
- Blackall Airport
- Shire of Blackall
