= Windeyer, Queensland =

Windeyer
- Suburb
- Interactive map of Windeyer
- Coordinates: 24.5672°S 146.4938°E
- Country: Australia
- State: Queensland
- LGA: Blackall-Tambo Region
- Location: 42.5 km (26.4 mi) NNE of Tambo; 144 km (89 mi) ESE of Blackall; 242 km (150 mi) N of Charleville; 427 km (265 mi) NW of Roma; 961 km (597 mi) NW of Brisbane

Government
  - State electorate: Gregory
  - Federal division: Maranoa

Area
  - Total: 2,073.5 km^{2} (800.6 sq mi)

Population
  - Total: 29 (2021 census)
  - Density: 0.01399/km^{2} (0.0362/sq mi)
- Time zone: UTC+10:00 (AEST)
- Postcode: 4478
Suburbs around Windeyer
Blackall	Alpha	Alpha
Mount Enniskillen	Windeyer	Mantuan Downs
Mount Enniskillen	Tambo	Caldervale

Windeyer is a rural locality in the Blackall-Tambo Region, Queensland, Australia. In the 2021 census, Windeyer had a population of 29 people.

== Geography ==
The Dawson Developmental Road enters the locality from the east (Mantuan Downs) and exits to the south (Tambo), where it joins the Landsborough Highway within the town of Tambo.

The Great Dividing Range forms the north-eastern boundary of the locality with the locality being within the Lake Eyre drainage basin, and more specifically within the catchments of the Barcoo River and Cooper Creek.

Windeyer has the following mountains (from north to south):

- Mount Solitary near the northern boundary of the locality (24.3479°S 146.2986°E), rising to 593 metres (1,946 ft) above sea level
- Mount Birkhead in the north of the locality (24.4458°S 146.2976°E) 626 metres (2,054 ft)
- Mount Windeyer in the centre of the locality (24.5994°S 146.3197°E) 611 metres (2,005 ft)
- Mount Blunt in the south of the locality (24.7450°S 146.3337°E) 555 metres (1,821 ft)

The predominant land use is grazing on native vegetation.

== History ==
Sir Thomas Mitchell mapped the area in 1846 naming Mount Windeyer (possibly after Richard Windeyer, a barrister and politician in New South Wales), Mount Birkhead, and Mount Blunt.

== Demographics ==
In the 2016 census, Windeyer had a population of 25 people.

In the 2021 census, Windeyer had a population of 29 people.

== Education ==
There are no schools in Windeyer. Tambo State School offers Kindergarten to Year 10 in neighbouring Tambo to the south, but not all students in Windeyer would be able to access this school due to distance. There are no schools offering education to Year 12 nearby. The alternatives are distance education and boarding school.
