= Macfarlane, Queensland =

Macfarlane
- Suburb
- Interactive map of Macfarlane
- Coordinates: 24.8886°S 146.0086°E
- Country: Australia
- State: Queensland
- LGA: Blackall-Tambo Region
- Location: 14.6 km (9.1 mi) W of Tambo; 97.9 km (60.8 mi) SE of Blackall; 215 km (134 mi) N of Charleville; 400 km (250 mi) NW of Roma; 878 km (546 mi) WNW of Brisbane

Government
  - State electorate: Gregory
  - Federal division: Maranoa

Area
  - Total: 532.1 km^{2} (205.4 sq mi)

Population
  - Total: 17 (2021 census)
  - Density: 0.0319/km^{2} (0.0827/sq mi)
- Time zone: UTC+10:00 (AEST)
- Postcode: 4478
Suburbs around Macfarlane
Blackall	Mount Enniskillen	Mount Enniskillen
Blackall	Macfarlane	Tambo
Minnie Downs	Minnie Downs	Lansdowne

Macfarlane is a rural locality in the Blackall-Tambo Region, Queensland, Australia. In the 2021 census, Macfarlane had a population of 17 people.

== Geography ==
The Barcoo River enters the locality from the east (Tambo) and exits to the north-east (Mount Enniskillen). The locality is within the Lake Eyre drainage basin.

The Landsborough Highway also enters the locality from the east (Tambo) and exits to the north-east (Mount Enniskillen), running west of the river.

The land use is grazing on native vegetation.

== Demographics ==
In the 2016 census, Macfarlane had a population of 14 people.

In the 2021 census, Macfarlane had a population of 17 people.

== Education ==
There are no schools in Macfarlane. The only nearby school is Tambo State School (Prep to Year 10) in neighbouring Tambo to the east. There are no nearby schools providing education to Year 12; the alternatives are distance education and boarding school.
