= Mount Enniskillen, Queensland =

Mount Enniskillen
- Suburb
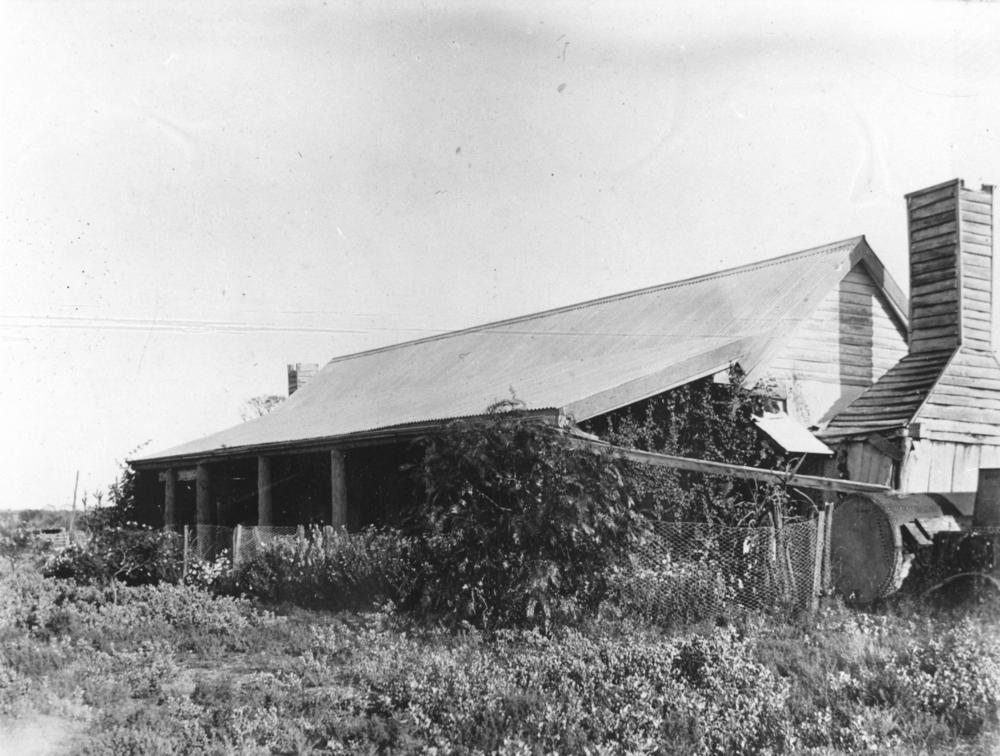
- Farmhouse at Mount Enniskillen pastoral station, 1903

- Interactive map of Mount Enniskillen
- Coordinates: 24.6713°S 146.0561°E
- Country: Australia
- State: Queensland
- LGA: Blackall-Tambo Region
- Location: 62.9 km (39.1 mi) NW of Tambo; 65.4 km (40.6 mi) SE of Blackall; 172 km (107 mi) SSE of Barcaldine; 611 km (380 mi) W of Rockhampton; 927 km (576 mi) NW of Brisbane

Government
  - State electorate: Gregory
  - Federal division: Maranoa

Area
  - Total: 1,081.2 km^{2} (417.5 sq mi)

Population
  - Total: 44 (2021 census)
  - Density: 0.0407/km^{2} (0.1054/sq mi)
- Time zone: UTC+10:00 (AEST)
- Postcode: 4472
Suburbs around Mount Enniskillen
Blackall	Blackall	Windeyer
Blackall	Mount Enniskillen	Windeyer
Macfarlane	Macfarlane	Tambo

Mount Enniskillen is a rural locality in the Blackall-Tambo Region, Queensland, Australia. In the 2021 census, Mount Enniskillen had a population of 44 people.

== Geography ==
The Enniskillen Range forms part of the south-western boundary of the locality. The mountain Mount Enniskillen (24.7152°S 145.8958°E) at the northern end of the range rises to 451 metres (1,480 ft) above sea level.

The Landsborough Highway enters the locality from the south-east (Macfarlane) and exits to the west (Blackall).

== History ==
The mountain was named on 1 October 1846 by Thomas Mitchell, the New South Wales Surveyor-General. It is believed to be named after Enniskillen in Northern Ireland.

== Demographics ==
In the 2016 census, Mount Enniskillen had a population of 13 people.

In the 2021 census, Mount Enniskillen had a population of 44 people.

== Education ==
There are no schools in Mount Enniskillen. The nearest government school is Tambo State School (Early Childhood to Year 10) in neighbouring Tambo to the south-east; however this school is only within range of a daily commute for students living in the south of Mount Enniskillen. Also, there are no school providing education to Year 12 nearby. The alternatives to daily school attendance are distance education and boarding school.
