= Blackall-Tambo Region =

Coordinates: 24°39′14″S 145°48′49″E

- Local government area
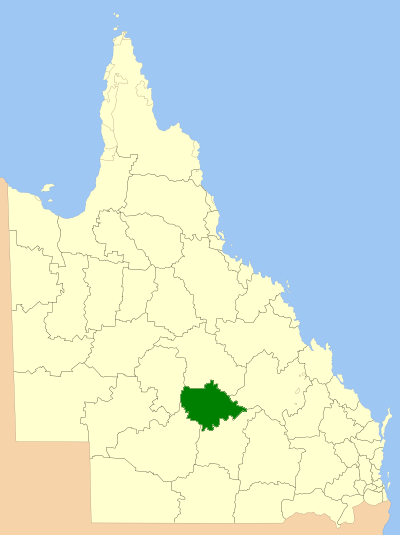
- Location within Queensland

- Interactive map of Blackall-Tambo Region
- Country: Australia
- State: Queensland
- Region: Central West Queensland
- Established: 2008
- Council seat: Blackall

Government
  - Mayor: Andrew Martin
  - State electorate: Gregory
  - Federal division: Maranoa

Area
  - Total: 30,537 km^{2} (11,790 sq mi)

Population
  - Total: 1,905 (2021 census)
  - Density: 0.062383/km^{2} (0.16157/sq mi)
- Website: Blackall-Tambo Region
LGAs around Blackall-Tambo Region
Longreach	Barcaldine	Central Highlands
Longreach	Blackall-Tambo Region	Murweh
Quilpie	Murweh	Murweh

The Blackall-Tambo Region is a local government area in Central West Queensland, Australia. Established in 2008, it was preceded by two previous local government areas dating from the 1870s.

For the financial year 2010/11 it had an approximate operating budget of A$30m.

In the 2021 census, the Blackall-Tambo Region had a population of 1,905 people.

== History ==
Kuungkari (also known as Kungkari and Koonkerri) is a language of Western Queensland. The Kuungkari language region includes the landscape within the local government boundaries of Longreach Shire Council and Blackall-Tambo Shire Council.

Prior to the 2008 amalgamation, the Blackall-Tambo Region existed as two distinct local government areas:

- the Shire of Blackall;
- and the Shire of Tambo.

The entire Region was originally part of Kargoolnah Division, which was created on 11 November 1879 as one of 74 divisions around Queensland under the Divisional Boards Act 1879. On 20 May 1880, a municipal Borough of Blackall was created to cover the town and its first councillors were elected in July 1880. On 1 January 1881, a new Tambo Division was proclaimed and excised from Kargoolnah.

With the passage of the Local Authorities Act 1902, Kargoolnah became a Shire on 31 March 1903, while Blackall became a Town. The latter was abolished on 7 November 1931 and became Division 3 of the Kargoolnah Shire, which had in the meantime shrunk to include only the Blackall region. On 19 November 1932, after representations to the State Government, Kargoolnah was officially renamed Blackall.

In July 2007, the Local Government Reform Commission released its report and recommended that the two areas amalgamate. Both councils opposed the amalgamation. On 15 March 2008, the two Shires formally ceased to exist, and elections were held on the same day to elect councillors and a mayor to the Regional Council.

== Wards ==
The Region has four divisions, each of whom elects one councillor, and a mayor is directly elected for the entire region.

== Mayors ==
- 2008–2012: Jan Ross
- 2012–2016: Barry Muir
- 2016–present: Andrew Linedale Martin

== Towns and localities ==
The Blackall-Tambo Region includes the following settlements:

Blackall area:

- Blackall
- Alice Downs
- Malvern Hills
- Northampton Downs
- Terrick Terrick
- Yalleroi (ghost town)

Tambo area:

- Tambo
- Bayrick
- Caldervale
- Landsdowne
- Lumeah
- Macfarlane
- Minnie Downs
- Mount Enniskillen
- Scrubby Creek
- Windeyer
- Yandarlo

== Amenities ==
Blackall-Tambo Regional Council operate public libraries at Blackall and Tambo.

== Demographics ==
The populations given relate to the component entities prior to 2008.

Year	Population (Region total)	Population (Blackall)	Population (Tambo)
1933	3,703	2,755	948
1947	3,370	2,488	882
1954	3,825	2,780	1,045
1961	4,415	3,291	1,124
1966	4,004	3,067	937
1971	3,156	2,325	831
1976	2,828	2,160	668
1981	2,985	2,223	762
1986	2,774	2,070	704
1991	2,661	2,045	616
1996	2,399	1,833	566
2001	2,450	1,822	628
2006	2,139	1,524	615
2016	1,903		
2021	1,905		

In the 2016 census, the Blackall-Tambo Region had a population of 1,903 people.

In the 2021 census, the Blackall-Tambo Region had a population of 1,905 people.
