= Gunggari people =

Aboriginal people of southern Queensland

The Gunggari (/ˈgʊŋgəri/ GUUNG-gə-ree) are an Aboriginal Australian tribe of southern Queensland. The traditional land of the Gunggari centres on the Maranoa River and overlaps with the land of the surrounding Mandandanji, Kooma, Kunja, Margany, Dharawala, Bidjara and Nguri peoples. They are to be distinguished from the Kuungkari, who also border Dharawala country.

== Language ==
The Gunggari language is a member of the Maric language family. It is closely related to, and sometimes considered a dialect of, neighbouring Bidjara and Manandanji languages. As of 2021 there are only three native speakers. Since 2013 the language has been taught in St Patrick's school, Mitchell, and is being actively revived.

== History ==
The Gunggari people were first contacted by Europeans in 1846 when Commissioner of Crown Lands, Roderick Mitchell, and his father, surveyor Thomas Mitchell, were on an expedition through the Maranoa Region. The following year, Ludwig Leichhardt also made contact.

In 1854, Edmund Morey occupied the Mitchell Downs pastoral run, which, after its conversion to a hotel, began the growth of Mitchell. This was resisted by the Gunggari people.

After Australia's federation in 1901, the Australian Government began the systemic removal of many Australian Aboriginals to work on government reserves or missions. In 1906, the first Gunggari people were removed from Forest Vale, with over 100 being removed between 1914 and 1941. Many Aboriginal people of the region took refuge on the Yumba ("Camp"), a shantytown to the east of Mitchell. The Yumba contained houses and humpies, and a schoolhouse until its relocation to Mitchell State School in 1948. In 1968, citing safety concerns from the lack of a sanitation system, the Yumba was demolished and the residents were forced to move into the neighbouring towns.

In the early 1990s, the Yumba's old schoolhouse was returned to the Yumba after successful lobbying from local Aboriginal people. It now stands as a museum of the Yumba and local Gunggari history.

A 1996 court case permitted Tenneco Energy Australia to install a pipeline through Gunggari, Mandandanji and Bidjarra land. The proposal for a pipeline was approved after the initial application, although this approval was later revoked by the Gunggari council. Smith on behalf of The Gunggari People v Tenneco Energy Queensland Pty. Ltd and The State of Queensland and Goolburri Aboriginal Corporation Land Council ruled that Tenneco Energy could carry on with construction.

In 2012, the Gunggari People were granted native title over 1,184 km^{2} of land. In 2014, a further 146.2 km^{2} was granted as native title. After a third determination, the Gunggari People have native title over approximately 19,400 km^{2} of land, greatly exceeding the initial application for 13,589.2 km^{2} of land.

== Gunggari involvement in the First World War ==
Throughout most of the First World War, Indigenous Australian involvement was forbidden, and all identified Indigenous applicants were rejected or sent home during training. In 1917, this ban was partially lifted to allow "half-castes" with one European parent to enlist. At least 8 Gunggari men enlisted in Roma and joined the 49th Infantry Battalion, 10th reinforcements.

== Notable people ==
- Ruth Hegarty, author and community leader
- Joanne Currie Nalingu, artist
- Lynette Nixon, author and community leader
- Johnathan Thurston, former rugby league player

== Alternative names ==
This is a list of names used to describe the Gunggari people historically and do not necessarily represent names that are currently used or accepted.

- Congaro
- Coongurri
- Gungari, Gunggari, Goongarree
- Kogai (language name)
- Kogurre
- Kungeri
- Kungri
- Ngaragari (Koamu word for the tongue spoken between Bollon and Nebine Creek)
- Unggari
- Unggri, Unghi
- Ungorri

== Sources ==
- Barlow, Harriott (1873). "Vocabulary of Aboriginal Dialects of Queensland". The Journal of the Anthropological Institute of Great Britain and Ireland. 2: 165–175. doi:10.2307/2841159. JSTOR 2841159.
- Cameron, A. L. P. (1904). "On two Queensland tribes". Science of Man. 7 (2). Sydney: 27–29.
- Caruana, Patrick (22 June 2012). "Gunggari win south Qld native title claim". The Sydney Morning Herald.
- "Gambara Gamu Biyu: Gunggari Language" (PDF). State Library of Queensland.
- "Gunggari Native Title Aboriginal Corporation RNTBC". National Native Title Council.
- Howitt, Alfred William (1904). The native tribes of south-east Australia (PDF). Macmillan.
- "Native title recognition for the Gunggari People of Queensland". National Native Title Tribunal. 22 June 2012.
- Ridley, William (1861). "Journal of a Missionary tour among the Aborigines of the Western Interior of Queensland, in the year 1855, by the rev. William Ridley, B.A." (PDF). In Lang, J. D. (ed.). Queensland, Australia; a highly eligible field for emigration, and the future cotton-field of Great Britain: with a disquisition on the origin, manners, and customs of the aborigines. London: E. Stanford. pp. 435–445.
- Ridley, William (1873). "Report on Australian Languages and Traditions". The Journal of the Anthropological Institute of Great Britain and Ireland. 2: 257–275. doi:10.2307/2841174. JSTOR 2841174.
- Tindale, Norman Barnett (1974). "Kunggari (QLD)". Aboriginal Tribes of Australia: Their Terrain, Environmental Controls, Distribution, Limits, and Proper Names. Australian National University. ISBN 978-0-708-10741-6. Archived from the original on 2 July 2017.
