= Australian Aboriginal artefacts =

Cultural artefacts used by Aboriginal Australians

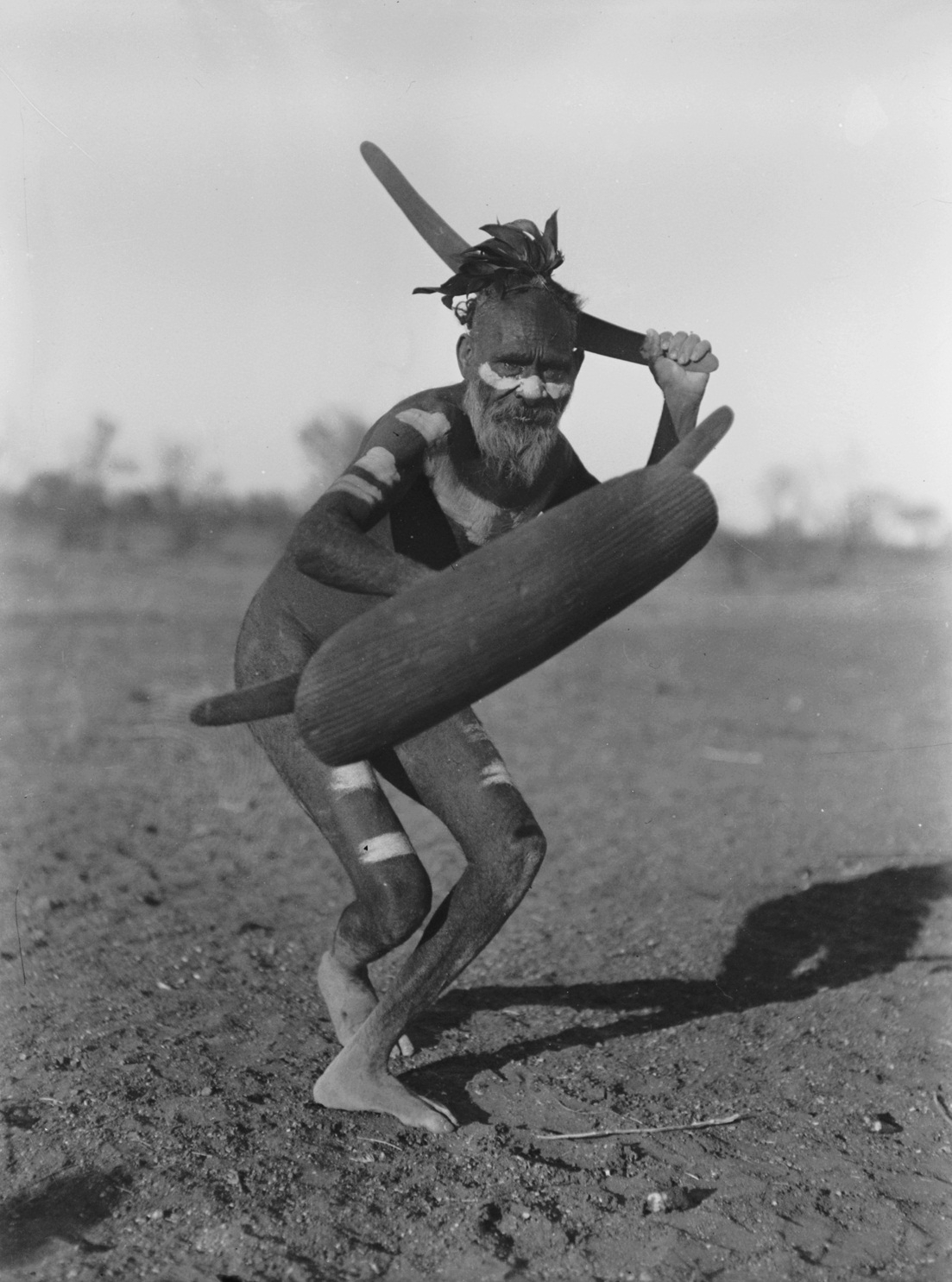
Aboriginal man with shield and boomerang

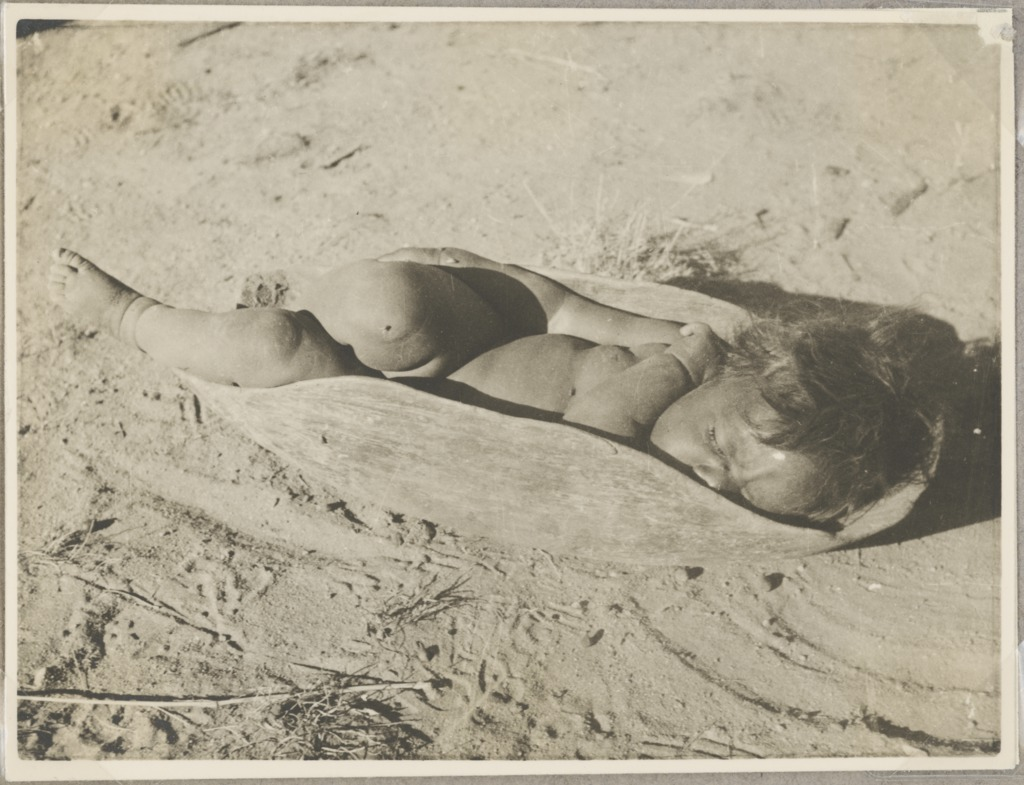
Child asleep in wooden dish, central Australia, c.1940s

Australian Aboriginal artefacts include a variety of cultural artefacts used by Aboriginal Australians. Most Aboriginal artefacts were multi-purpose and could be used for a variety of different occupations. Spears, clubs, boomerangs and shields were used generally as weapons for hunting and in warfare. Watercraft technology artefacts in the form of dugout and bark canoes were used for transport and for fishing. Stone artefacts include cutting tools and grinding stones to hunt and make food. Coolamons and carriers such as dillybags, allowed Aboriginal peoples to carry water, food and cradle babies. Message sticks were used for communication, and ornamental artefacts for decorative and ceremonial purposes. Aboriginal children’s toys were used to both entertain and educate.

== Weapons ==
Aboriginal peoples used several different types of weapons including shields (also known as hielaman), spears, spear-throwers, boomerangs and clubs. Peoples from different regions used different weapons. Some peoples, for example, would fight with boomerangs and shields, whereas in another region they would fight with clubs. Weapons could be used both for hunting game and in warfare.

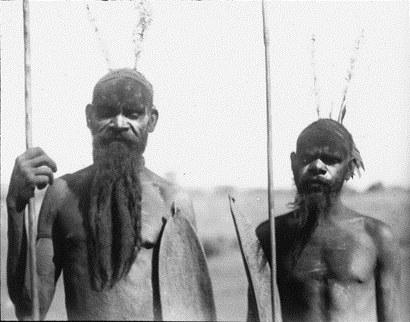
Aboriginal men with spears and shields

Weapons were of different styles in different areas. For example, a shield from Central Australia is very different from a shield from North Queensland.

=== Spears ===
Aboriginal peoples used spears for a variety of purposes including hunting, fishing, gathering fruit, fighting, retribution, punishment, in ceremony, as commodities for trade, and as symbolic markers of masculinity. Spears were historically used by skilful hand-throwing, but with changes in Aboriginal spear technologies during the mid-Holocene, they could be thrown further and with more accuracy with the aid of spear-thrower projectiles. Spears could be made from a variety of materials including softwoods, bamboo (Bambusa arnhemica), cane and reed. Projectile points could also be made from many different materials including flaked stone, shell, wood, kangaroo or wallaby bone, lobster claws, stingray spines, fish teeth, and more recently iron, glass and ceramics. These spear points could be bound to the spear using mastics, glues, gum, string, plant fibre and sinews.

=== Clubs ===
An Aboriginal club, otherwise known as a waddy or nulla-nulla, could be used for a variety of purposes such as for hunting, fishing, digging, for grooving tools, warfare and in ceremonies. A fighting club, called a ‘Lil-lil’, could, with a heavy blow, break a leg, rib or skull. Clubs which could create severe trauma were made from extremely hard woods such as acacias including ironwood and mitji. Many clubs were fire hardened and others had sharpened stone quartz attached to the handle with spinifex resin.

=== Boomerangs ===
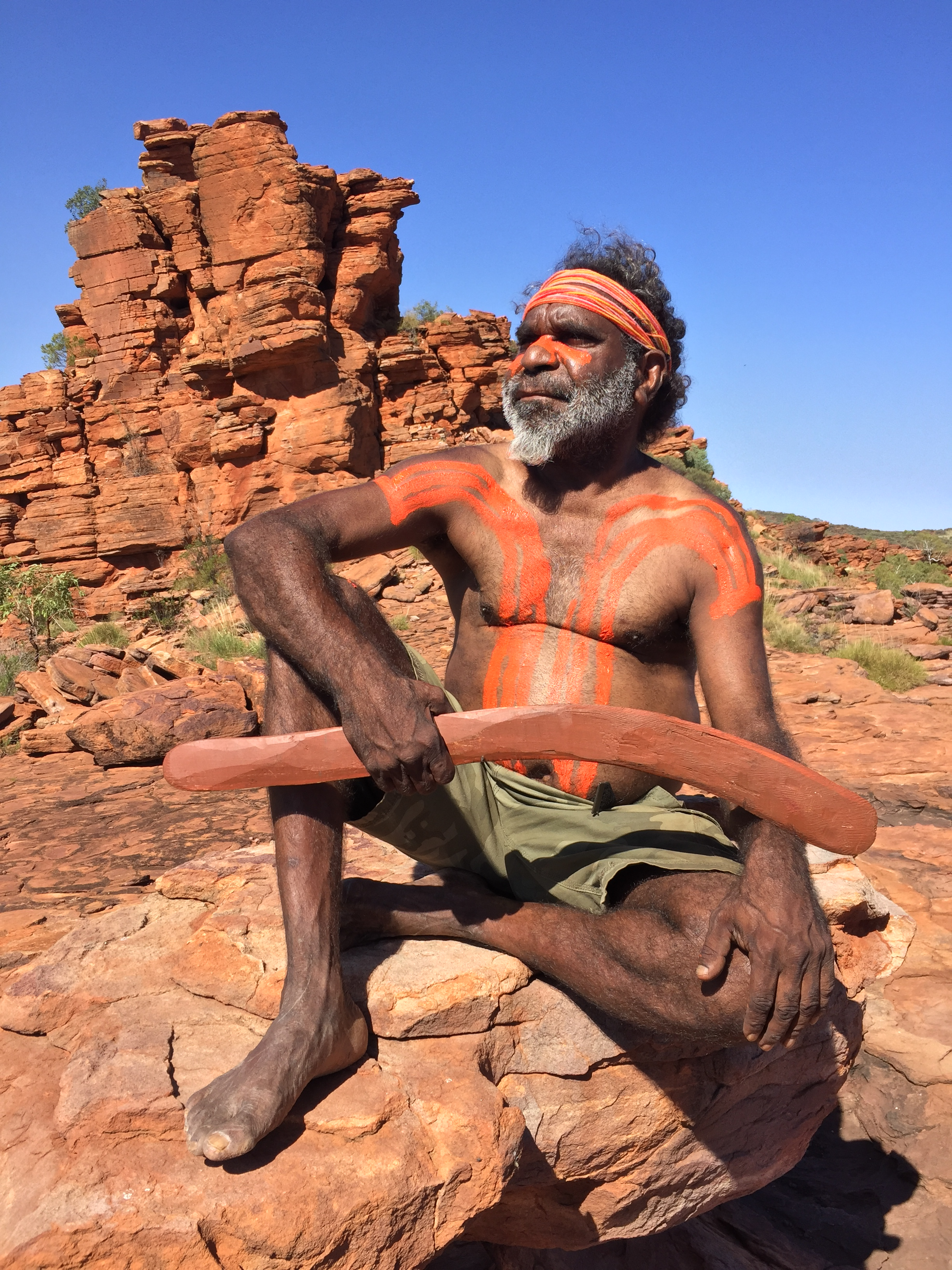
Aboriginal man with boomerang, near Yuendumu

The boomerang is recognised by many as a significant cultural symbol of Australia. The term 'returning boomerang' is used to distinguish between ordinary boomerangs and the small percentage which, when thrown, will return to its thrower. The oldest wooden boomerang artefact known in Australia, excavated from the Wyrie Swamp, South Australia in 1973, is estimated to be 9,500 years old.

Boomerangs could be used:

- as hunting or fighting weapons;
- for digging;
- as cutting knives;
- for making fire by friction; and
- as percussion instruments for making music.

=== Shields ===
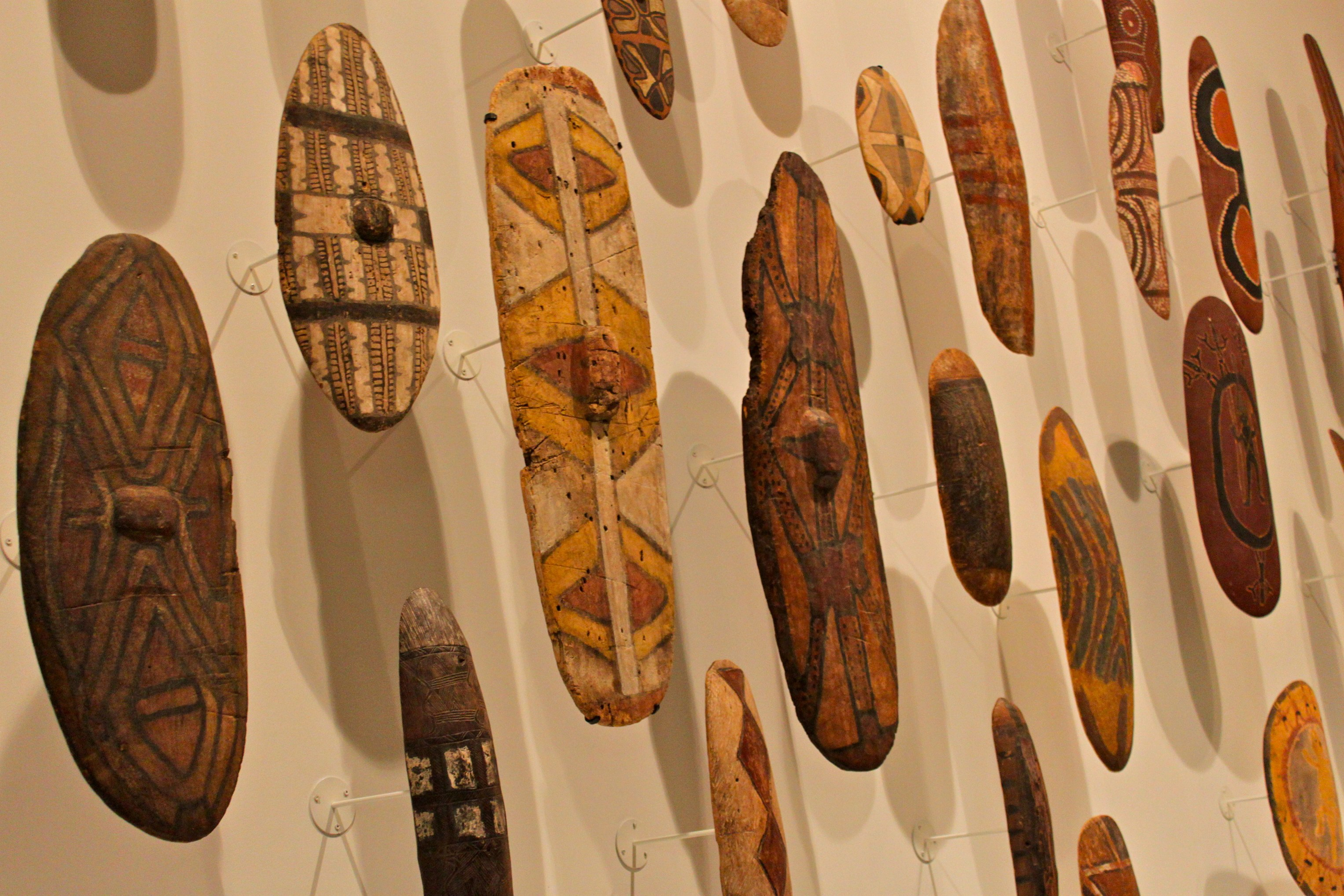
Aboriginal shields from Ian Potter Centre

Shields were mainly used by Aboriginal warriors to defend themselves in dispute battles, often for commodities such as territory. A shield which had not lost a battle was thought to be inherently powerful and was a prized possession. Shields were made from wood or bark and usually had carved markings or painted designs. They could also be used in ceremonies such as in corroborees.

Aboriginal shields come in two main types: broad shields, and parrying shields. Parrying shields parry blows from a club whereas broad shields block spears. Shields for parrying are thick, strong and narrow, whereas broad shields are wide but thin. Aboriginal shields were made from different materials in different areas, they were made from buttress root, mulga wood, and bark. A handle is attached or carved on the back and the shield was often painted with red and white patterns. Arragong and Tawarrang shields were carved of wood often with an outer layer of bark. Tawarrang shields were notably narrow and long and had patterns carved into the sides. This particular category of shield could also be used as a musical instrument when struck with a club, in addition to its use as a weapon.

The Elemong shield is made from bark and is oval in shape. A handle is attached to the back and the shield was often painted with red and white patterns. Arragong and Tawarrang shields were carved of wood often with an outer layer of bark. Tawarrang shields were notably narrow and long and had patterns carved into the sides. This particular category of shield could also be used as a musical instrument when struck with a club, in addition to its use as a weapon.

Shields originating from the North Queensland rainforest region are highly sought after by collectors due to their lavish decorative painting designs. These shields were made from buttress roots of rainforest fig trees (Ficus sp.) They were painted with red, yellow, white and black using natural materials including ochre, clay, charcoal and human blood. Shields from the post-contact period can, in some instances, include the colour blue. A piece of lawyer cane (Calamus australis) would be pushed up the shield owner's nose to cause bleeding. Blood would be put onto the shield, signifying their life being shared with the object. Designs on each shield were original and would represent the owners’ totemic affiliations and their country. This could be done through symbolism, composition and other means of visual representation. On the final day of a young Aboriginal man's initiation ceremony, he is given a blank shield for which he can create his own design. It was believed that the shield harnessed the power and protection of the owners totem and ancestral spirits.

The shield is a form of embodied knowledge that acts as substitute for the human body – a symbol not only of the person in his entirety but also a symbol of his expanded self, that is, his relationships with others. The shield covers the entire body, protects the body, is painted by and with the body (blood) and links the body (through totemic design) to clan..

— John Hayward, "Two rare shield depictions from the Burrungkuy rock art region of Western Arnhem Land, Australia", Australian Archaeology (2020, Aug 17)

==== Findings ====
Museum Collections
The Australian Museum	Aboriginal Shields from the Australian Museum collection The Australian Museum holds one of the wooden shields originating from the Kuku Yalanji people of the Daintree Rainforest on Cape York, Queensland.
The British Museum	One of the most significant and earliest surviving Australian Aboriginal shield artefacts is widely believed The Gweagal Shield 1770 to have been collected by Captain Cook in 1770 during his first expedition (1768–71) to Australia. Known as the Gweagal shield, it is 0.97 m (3 ft 2 in) long and 0.29 m (11 in) wide and the bark has indentations on the surface, notably an obvious hole in the centre. Radiographic images and scientific studies reveal that this was not a result of natural occurrences. The hole is believed, but not proven, to have been caused by a firearm during Cook’s attempt to make way to shore in April 1770. The artefact was transported back to England and is now on display in the British Museum in Cabinet 96 in the Enlightenment Gallery as Oc1978, Q.839. It is regarded as a rare item which holds deep historical, scientific and social significance for indigenous and non-indigenous people. For this reason, the shield is a part of the “A History of the World in 100 Objects” project as Object 89.

== Watercraft ==
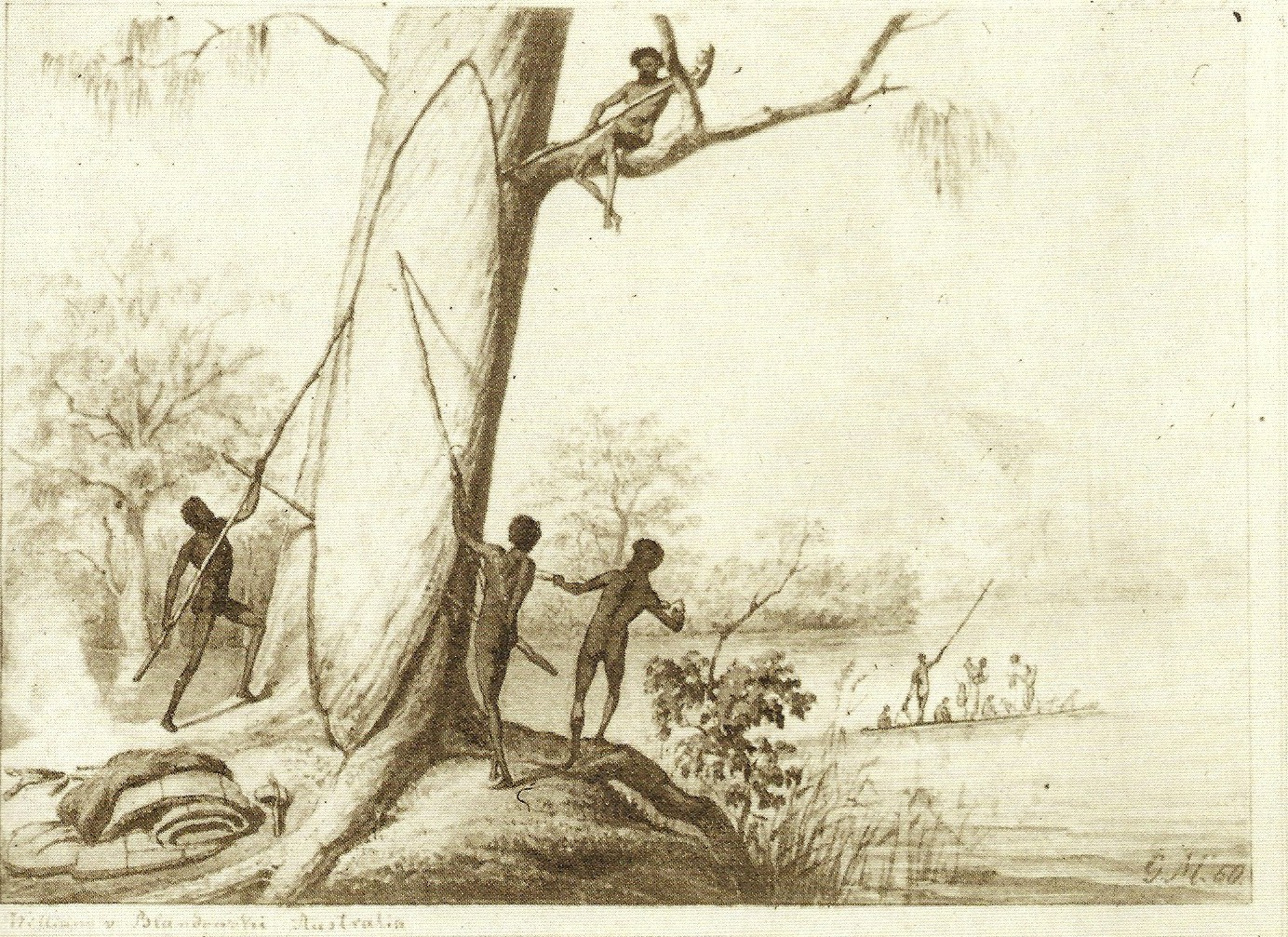
Aboriginal bark canoe making

Types of watercraft differed among Aboriginal communities, the most notable including bark canoes and dugout canoes which were built and used in different ways. Methods of constructing canoes were passed down through word of mouth in Aboriginal communities, not written or drawn. Canoes were used for fishing, hunting and as transport.

=== Bark canoes ===
Bark canoes were most commonly made from Eucalypt species including the bark of swamp she-oak Casuarina glauca, Eucalyptus botryoides, stringybark Eucalyptus agglomerata and Eucalyptus acmenoides. Bark could only be successfully extracted at the right time of a wet season in order to limit the damage to the tree's growth and so that it was flexible enough to use. The bark would be cut with axes and peeled from the tree. More than one piece of bark was sometimes used. "Canoe trees" can be distinguished today due to their distinctive scars. The shaping was done by a combination of heating with fire and soaking with water. The ends of the bark canoe would be fastened with plant-fibre string with the bow (front of canoe) fastened to a point. Branches could be used to reinforce joints; and clay, mud or other resin could be used to seal them. Due to the small draft and lightness of bark canoes, they were used in calmer waters such as billabongs, rivers, lakes, estuaries and bays. Aboriginal men would throw spears to catch fish from the canoe, whereas women would use hooks and lines. Bark paddles could be used to propel the canoe and thick leafy branches were held to catch the wind.

=== Dugout canoes ===
Dugout canoes were a major development in watercraft technology and were suited for the open sea and in rougher conditions. They could be used for hunting dugongs and sea turtles.

== Stone artefacts ==
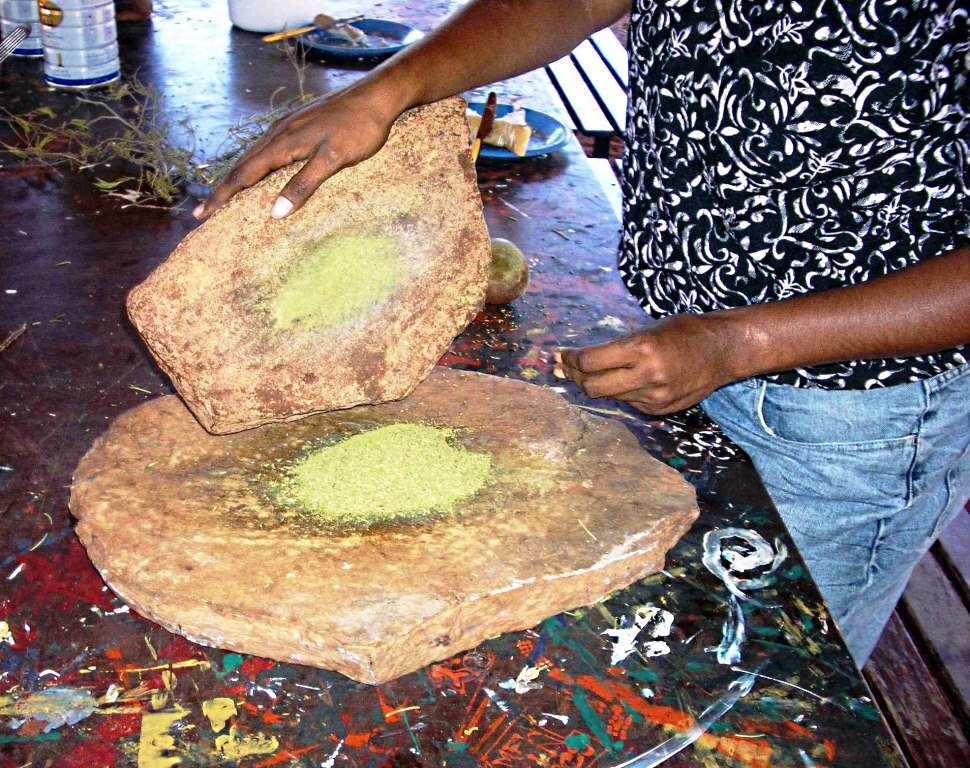
Aboriginal grain grinding

Stone artefacts scattered on the ground, Paroo River, Central Queensland.

Cutting tools made of stone and grinding or pounding stones were also used as everyday items by Aboriginal peoples. Cutting tools were made by hammering a core stone into flakes. Grinding stones can include millstones and mullers. Quartzite is one of the main materials Aboriginal people used to create flakes but slate and other hard stone materials were also used. Flakes can be used to create spear points and blades or knives. Grindstones were used against grass seeds to make flour for bread, and to produce marrow from bones.

Stone artefacts not only were used for a range of necessary activities such as hunting, but they also hold a special spiritual meaning. Indigenous Australians describe a stone artefact as holding the spirit of an ancestor who once owned it. 30,000-year-old grinding stones have been found at Cuddie Springs, NSW. Leilira blades from Arnhem Land were collected between 1931 and 1948 and are as of 2021 held at the Australian Museum.

== Coolamons and carriers ==
Coolamons are Aboriginal vessels, generally used to carry water, food, and to cradle babies. Coolamons could be made from a variety of materials including wood, bark, animal skin, stems, seed stalks, stolons, leaves and hair. When travelling long distances, coolamons were carried on the head. Akartne was placed underneath the coolamon to support its weight. They could be made from possum hair, feathers, or twisted grass.

=== Findings ===
Museum Collections
Australian Museum	Aboriginal Coolamons and Carriers from the Australian Museum collection The Australian Museum holds a bark water carrying vessel originating from Flinders Island, Queensland in 1905. This coolamon is made from the bark shell of a eucalyptus tree trunk that has been burnt and smoothed with stone and shells in order to hold and store water. A water bag made from kangaroo skin was acquired by the Australian Museum in 1893. It originates from the Urania people of North-West, Queensland.
South Australian Museum	The South Australian Museum holds a wooden coolamon collected in 1971 by Robert Edwards. The British Museum holds a bark water carrying vessel originating from the Worrorra in the Kimberley, North-Western Australia.

== Message sticks ==
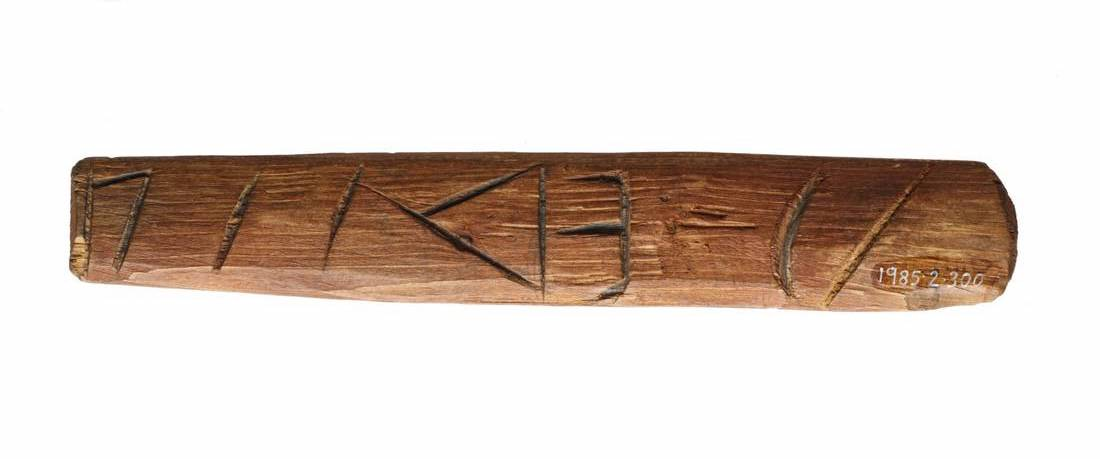
Message stick

Message sticks, also known as "talking-sticks", were used in Aboriginal communities to communicate invitations, declarations of war, news of death and so forth. They were made of wood and were usually flat with motifs engraved on all sides to express a message. The type of wood and shape of a message stick could be a part of the message. Special messengers would carry message sticks over long distances and were able to travel through tribal borders without harm. After the message had been received, generally the message stick would be burned.

=== Findings ===
Museum Collections
Australian Museum	Aboriginal Message Sticks from the Australian Museum collection The Australian Museum holds 230 message sticks in its collection.
South Australian Museum	The South Australian Museum holds 283 message sticks in its collection.
British Museum	The British Museum holds 74 message sticks in its collection.
National Museum of Australia	The National Museum of Australia holds 53 message sticks in its collection.
Pitt Rivers Museum	The Pitt Rivers Museum holds a message stick from the 19th century made of Acacia homalophylla which originates from Queensland. Originally sent by a Yagalingu man to a Wadjalang man, it is an invitation to hunt emu and wallaby. Zig-zagged symbols carved into the wood represent ‘emu’ and the cross-hatching represent ‘wallaby’. The British Museum holds a Kalkatungu message stick, collected by Charles Handley in 1900, created to communicate the death of three children through a combination of diamond-shaped engravings.

== Ornamental artefacts ==
Some Aboriginal peoples used materials such as teeth and bone to make ornamental objects such as necklaces and headbands.

=== Teeth ornaments ===
The most common teeth ornaments consisted of lower incisors of macropods such as kangaroos or wallabies. One of the most fascinating discoveries was a necklace made from 178 Tasmanian devil (Sarcophilus harrisii) teeth recovered from Lake Nitchie in New South Wales in 1969. Forehead ornaments have also been found to use porpoise and dolphin teeth from the Gulf of Carpentaria. Crocodile teeth were used mainly in Arnhem Land.

=== Bone ornaments ===
Bones were often used for ornamental purposes, especially necklaces and pendants. These were usually worn in association with ritual or age status but could also be worn casually. Bone ornaments found from Boulia in central western Queensland were made from the phalanges of kangaroos and dingoes. Branchiostegal rays of eels from the Tully River were used as pendant units by the Gulngay people. In western Victoria, echidna (Tachyglossus aculeatus) quills were threaded as necklaces. A pendant made from goose down, shells, a duck beak and the upper beak of a black swan was discovered from the Murray River in South Australia. Talons of eagles were incorporated into ornaments among the Arrernte of Central Australia. Wombat (Vombatus ursinus) claw necklaces are known from Victoria. Painted requiem shark vertebrae necklaces have been found in western Arnhem Land.

=== Pearl shells ===
Riji are the pearl shells traditionally worn by Aboriginal men in the north-west part of Australia, around present day Broome. The word riji is from the Bardi language. Another word for it is jakuli. Before being decorated, the pearl shell is known as guwan. Lines known as ramu, often in a sacred pattern or depicting a traditional story, are carved onto the guwan, at which point it becomes a riji. Ochre is sometimes applied to the incisions, for colour. Riji are associated with water, as well as spiritual or healing powers, and life.

== Clothing ==
=== Kopis ===
The Kopi mourning cap is an item of headware made from clay, worn by mostly womenfolk of some Aboriginal peoples, for up to six months after the death of a loved one. After cutting off their hair, they would weave a net using sinews from emu, place this on their head, and cover it with layers of gypsum, a type of white clay obtained from rivers. They could be heavy (up to 7 kg (15 lb)), and were sometimes worn by men. When the mourning period was over, the Kopi would be placed on the grave of the deceased person.

Other names for the Kopi were widow's cap, korno, mulya, mung-warro, pa-ta, and yúgarda.

== Children's toys ==
Children's toys made by Aboriginal peoples were not only to entertain but also to educate. Toys were made from different materials depending on location and materials available.

=== Dolls ===
"Dolls" could be made from cassia nemophila, with its branches assembled with string and grass. Features were often painted with clay to represent a baby. Dolls made from Xanthorrhoea are called Kamma dolls and are from Keppel Island. Shell dolls could also be made from conical shells and were often wrapped in fabric to distinguish age or status.

=== Rattles ===
Rattles could be made out of a variety of different materials which would depend on geographical accessibility. For example, they could be made out of land snail shells, sea snail shells (Haliotis asinina), valves of scallop (Annachlamys flabellata), walnut seeds or olive shells which were strung together with string or hair and were often painted.

=== Bags and baskets ===
In Arnhem Land, the Gulf region of Queensland and Cape York, children’s bags and baskets were made from fibre twine.

=== Toy spears and shields ===
Play spears, which were often blunt wooden spears, were used by boys in mock battles and throwing games.

=== Collections ===
Museum Collections
Australian Museum	370 toys collected between 1885 and 1990 are currently held at the Australian Museum. In 1899 Walter Roth found and collected three rattles (Strombus campbelli, Cyroea subviridis and Arca pilula) from Mapoon, Batavia River and Cape York Peninsula. Three dolls made of curved stick and fabric date back to the early 1900s from North Queensland.
Tasmanian Museum and Art Gallery	Three wooden dolls from Mornington Island are held by the Tasmanian Museum and Art Gallery.

== Sacred items ==
Artefacts sometimes regarded as sacred items and/or used in ceremonies include bullroarers, didgeridoos and carved boards called churinga.

== Art ==
Most Aboriginal art is not considered artefact, but often the designs in Aboriginal art are similar designs to those originally on sacred artefacts.

== Keeping Places ==
A Keeping Place (usually capitalised) is an Aboriginal community-managed place for the safekeeping of repatriated cultural material or local cultural heritage items, cultural artefacts, art and/or knowledge. Krowathunkooloong Keeping Place in Gippsland, Victoria is one example of a Keeping Place. In Western Australia there is a collaboratively developed and managed online system for managing cultural heritage known as The Keeping Place Project.

== See also ==
- Australian Aboriginal culture
- Indigenous Collection (Miles District Historical Village)
- Lizard Island#Mangrove Beach, a 2024 pottery finding
