= Gunggari =

Gunggari may refer to:

- a variety of the extinct Bidjara language of Australia
- Kungkari language, another extinct Australian language
- Gunggari people, an Aboriginal tribe of southern Queensland, Australia

Gungari is a village in the tehsil of Jaisinghpur, Himachal Pradesh, India
