= Kungadidji =

Aboriginal Australian people

The Kungadutji were an indigenous Australian people of the state of Queensland.

== Country ==
An early settler in the area, J. Heagney described Kundagutji land in the following terms:

The Kungarditchi country is about twenty miles square, and is bounded on the south by the Kiabara Creek, and on the west by the Koongerri country.

Norman Tindale's estimate of Kungadutji tribal lands assigns them something in the range of 2,800 sq- miles. They were one of the Channel Country peoples associated with the Cooper Creek river system, and lay to the north of Durham Downs. Their eastern limits were around Mount Howitt and Kyabra Creek. Their northwesterly frontiers lay in proximity of Lake Yamma Yamma. Neighbouring tribes were the Kuungkari, Bidia and Kulumali.

== History of contact ==
White settlers began to occupy Kungadutji lands between 1874 and 1878, together with those of the neighbouring Kuungkari and Bidia. The combined population of these three groups in the period of first contacts was estimated to be around 1,200 people. Within a decade, by 1883, women greatly outnumbered the male population, large numbers of the latter being shot down during the process of occupying their country. The women contracted syphilis from the newcomers, whose effects further ravaged the tribes. (Note: Since the advent of the Whites, few children are reared—the rifle, syphilis, and debauchery having, as usual, commenced the work of extermination.)

== Alternative names ==
- Kungaditji
- Kungarditchi
- Kunatatchee

== Some words ==
- dethee/conatha (wild dog)
- copunya/moonaroo (father)
- ominya (mother)

== Sources ==
- "AIATSIS map of Indigenous Australia". AIATSIS. 14 May 2024.
- Heagney, J. (1886). "The Junction of the Thomson and Barcoo Rivers, also the Whitula Creek" (PDF). In Curr, Edward Micklethwaite (ed.). The Australian race: its origin, languages, customs, place of landing in Australia and the routes by which it spread itself over the continent. Vol. 2. Melbourne: J. Ferres. pp. 374–381.
- Tindale, Norman Barnett (1974). "Kungadutji (QLD)". Aboriginal Tribes of Australia: Their Terrain, Environmental Controls, Distribution, Limits, and Proper Names. Australian National University. ISBN 978-0-708-10741-6.
