= Kuungkari language =

Extinct Australian Aboriginal language

Kuungkari
- Kungkari
- Native to: Australia
- Region: Queensland
- Ethnicity: Kuungkari
- Extinct: 1969, with the death of Arthur Winkers (Winkili)
- Language family: Pama–Nyungan: (unclassified, possibly Karnic); Kuungkari

Language codes
- ISO 639-3: lku
- Glottolog: kuun1236
- AIATSIS: L38
- ELP: Kungkari

Kuungkari (also Gunggari, Koonkerri, Kungkari) is an extinct and unclassified Australian Aboriginal language. The Kuungkari language region included the landscape within the local government boundaries of the Longreach Shire Council and Blackall-Tambo Shire Council.

== History ==
The last speaker of Kuungkari was Arthur Winkers, or rather more correctly Winkili, who died in 1969 in Cherbourg. Gavan Breen collected data in Kuungkari from him in 1967 and 1968.

=== Documentation ===
A vocabulary by J. Heagney published in 1886 in Edward Micklethwaite Curr's The Australian Race calls the language "Kungarditchi". The vocabulary for a language called "Koongerri" 'dry' is listed in an different area that the Kungkari of other sources, and the vocabulary does not correspond either.

== Classification ==
Geoffrey O'Grady, Charles F. Voegelin, and Florence M. Voegelin classified Kuungkari as a Maric language. According to Breen, this is erroneous, possibly due to confusion with the similarly-named Gunggari, which was Maric, or was derived from a vocabulary of "Yangeeberra" by John Ahern and also published in Curr's The Australian Race in 1887. Breen's fieldwork with the last speaker of Kuungkari, augumented by an unpublished vocabulary by Norman Tindale and Heagney's vocabulary, showed that it was rather different from Maric, including Yangeeberra, and that Tindale's distribution of Kuungkari was much too far to the east. Bowern (2001) mentions Kungkari as a possible Karnic language. Wafer and Lissarrague (2008) report that a description of Kungkari by Breen (1990) is of Kungkari, not Gunggari.

== Geographical distribution ==
The drainage basin of the Barcoo River was inhabited by the Kuungkari, living along the Barcoo itself, its tributaries, and a large part of the drainage basin of the Thomson River, the Wadjalang, the Iningai, and the Wadjabangai. All four were said to speak dialects of a single language by O'Grady, Voegelin, and Voegelin.

== Phonology ==
=== Consonants ===
	Peripheral		Laminal		Apical	
	Labial	Velar	Dental	Palatal	Alveolar	Retroflex
Plosive	p	k	t̪	c	t	ʈ
Nasal	m	ŋ	n̪	ɲ	n	ɳ
Rhotic					r	
Lateral			(l̪)	ʎ	l	ɭ
Approximant	w			j		ɻ

- The dental lateral [l̪] mainly occurs as an allophone of /l/ within the consonant cluster /lt̪/.
- /t/ may be realized as a voiced stop [d] when after /n/, or as a voiced tap [ɾ] in intervocalic positions.

=== Vowels ===
	Front	Central	Back
High	i iː		u (uː)
Low		a aː	

- The long [uː] only rarely occurs.
