= Bidjara language =

Australian Aboriginal language

Bidyara
- Southern Maric
- Native to: Queensland, Australia
- Region: Between Tambo and Augathella; Warrego and Langlo Rivers
- Ethnicity: Bidjara, Kongabula, Maranganji, Gunya, Wadja, Gayiri, Wadjalang, Wadjabangai, Iningai, Mandandanji, Gunggari, Koamu (Kooma), Ganulu, Nguri, Yagalingu
- Extinct: by 1987; 22 (2016 census)
- Revival: revival movements for Bidjara and Gunggari
- Language family: Pama–Nyungan: Maric; Bidyara
- Dialects: Bidjara (& Gungabula); Marrganj (Margany/Mardigan) & Gunja (Gunya); Wadjingu (Wadjigu = Wadja); Gayiri (Kairi); Wadjalang (Dharawala); Wadjabangayi; Yiningayi; Yanjdjibara; Kogai (Mandandanyi/Mandandanjdji, Gunggari/Kunggari, Guwamu/Kooma); Ganulu; Nguri; Yagalingu?

Language codes
- ISO 639-3: Variously: bym – Bidyara gyy – Gunya gyf – Gungabula zmc – Margany wdu – Wadjigu zmk – Mandandanyi gwu – Guwamu kgl – Kunggari wdy – Wadjabangayi xyb – Yandjibara ygi – Yiningayi
- Glottolog: sout2765
- AIATSIS: E37 Bidjara, D38 Kogai, D42 Margany, E39 Wadjigu, E44 Gayiri, D45 Wadjalang / Dharawala; Iningay; Yandjibara; Ganulu; Nguri; Yagalingu /Wadjaninga

Bidjara, also spelt Bidyara or Pitjara, is an Australian Aboriginal language. In 1980, it was spoken by 20 elders in Queensland between the towns of Tambo and Augathella, or the Warrego and Langlo Rivers. There are many dialects of the language, including Gayiri and Gunggari. Some of them are being revitalised and are being taught in local schools in the region. The various dialects are not all confirmed or agreed by linguists.

== Dialects ==
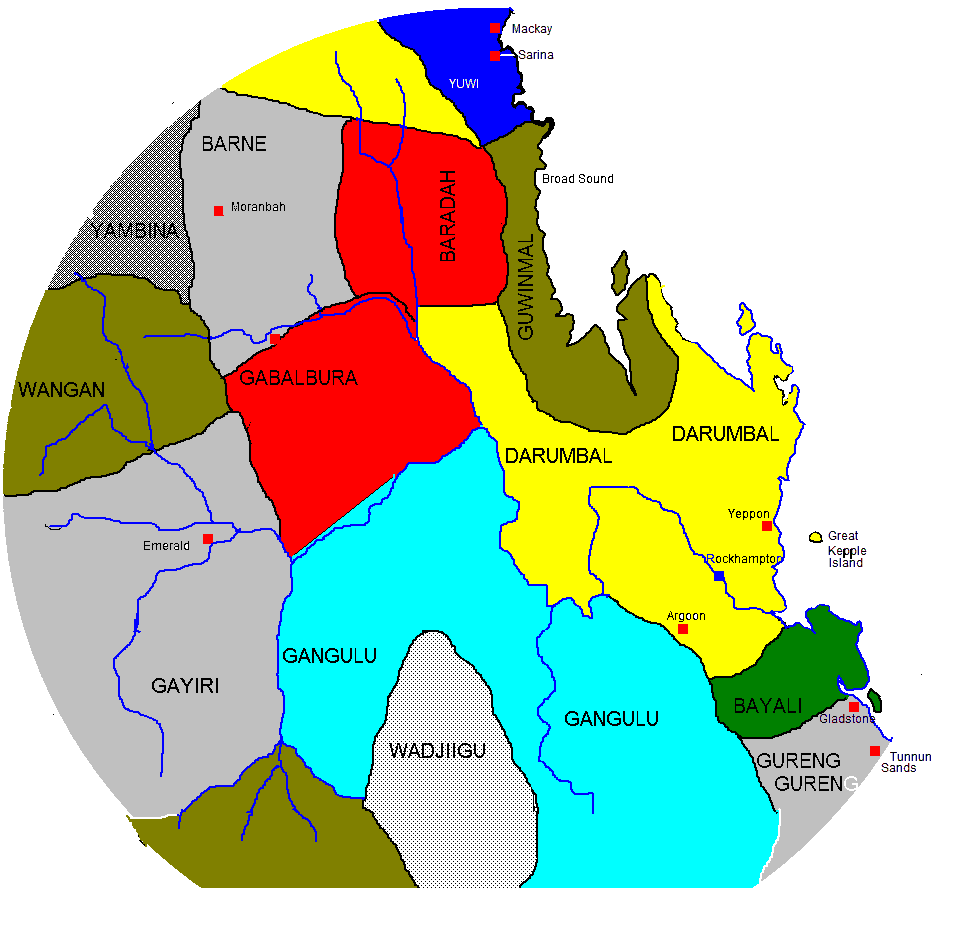
Traditional lands of Aboriginal people around Rockhampton and Gladstone, Queensland

The Bidjara language included numerous dialects, of which Bidjara proper was the last to go extinct. One of these was Gunya (Kunja), spoken over 31,200 km^{2} (12,188 sq mi), from the Warrego River near Cunnamulla north to Augathella and Burenda Station; west to between Cooladdi and Cheepie; east to Morven and Angallala Creek; at Charle-ville. Fred McKellar was the last known speaker. Yagalingu is poorly attested but may have been a dialect of Bidjara.

Natalie Kwok prepared a report on Gunggari for the National Native Title Tribunal in Australia. In it she says:

Language served as an important identity marker between the Gunggari and Bidjara peoples. Although academically speaking, differences between the two languages have been found to be minor, from an emic point of view such distinctions were meaningful and consequential. Lynette Nixon recounts that when her father used to converse with the Gadd brothers it was understood that, although communication was possible, they each spoke in their own tongue. Ann-Eckermann recounts,

I was present many times when Bert Mailman (Bidjera) and Aunty Mini Dodd and Aunty Annie Currie would sit outside their houses calling out to one another in language – it was explained to me that Bert spoke Bidjera from Augathella and that the two old ladies were speaking Gunggari – and that, although some of the words were mutually intelligible, Bert really couldn't understand what the ladies were saying – and it was driving him crazy because the women were making fun of him. (pers. comm.)

The Wadjigu (also known as Wadja, Wadya, Wadjainngo, Mandalgu, and Wadjigun) language region includes the local government areas of the Aboriginal Shire of Woorabinda and Central Highlands Region, including the Blackdown Tablelands. the Comet River, and the Expedition Range, and the towns of Woorabinda, Springsure and Rolleston.

== Language revival ==
=== Bidjara ===
Australian Bidjara artist Christian Bumbarra Thompson employs his Bidjara language in his video work in an attempt to redistribute his language into the public realm. His work Gamu Mambu, which means "Blood Song", is a video work of a Dutch Baroque opera singer singing in Bidjara. It was included in the 17th Sydney Biennale, The Beauty of Distance: Songs of Survival in a Precarious Age.

During NAIDOC Week in 2019, Bidjara man Owen Stanley shared his insights on the loss of language, and his sadness at not being fluent in his own language, with an audience at Uniting NSW. He said that his grandmother was one of the last 20 elders who died with the language, and attempts were being made to revive the language.

=== Gunggari ===
As of 2021, there were only three native speakers of the Gunggari language left, including Elder of the Year Aunty Lynette Nixon, and a major language revival effort has been under way in Queensland schools since St Patrick's School in Mitchell started teaching it around 2013. Since then, Mitchell State School has also started teaching Gunggari. Aunty Lynette, along with the Gunggari Native Title Corporation (NTC), have been compiling the first Gunggari dictionary. Gunggari NTC have also developed language workshops, for adults to learn their people's language, holding the first off-country in Toowoomba. As of November 2021, they were planning to extend the workshops to Brisbane, Woorabinda and Mitchell.

== Phonology ==
=== Vowels ===
	Front	Central	Back
High	i iː		u uː
Low		a aː	

=== Consonants ===
Consonants in the Bidyara dialect
	Peripheral		Laminal		Apical	
	Labial	Velar	Dental	Palatal	Alveolar	Retroflex
Plosive	b	ɡ	d̪	ɟ	d	ɖ
Nasal	m	ŋ	n̪	ɲ	n	
Lateral					l	
Rhotic					ɾ	
Approximant	w			j		ɻ

Consonants in the Margany and Gunya dialects
		Peripheral		Laminal		Apical	
		Labial	Velar	Dental	Palatal	Alveolar	Retroflex
Plosive	voiceless	p	k	t̪	c	t	ʈ
Plosive	voiced	b	ɡ	d̪	ɟ	d	ɖ
Nasal		m	ŋ	n̪	ɲ	n	ɳ
Lateral					ʎ	l	ɭ
Rhotic						r	
Approximant		w			j		ɻ

== Vocabulary ==
Below is a basic vocabulary list from Blake (1981).

English	Bidyara
man	mardi
woman	gambi
mother	yanga
father	yabu
head	ḏun-gu
eye	ḏili
nose	guwu
ear	manga
mouth	ḏaa
tongue	ḏalany
tooth	yira
hand	marda
breast	ngamun
stomach	banbu
urine	ḏuḏard
faeces	guna
thigh	ḏara
foot	ḏina
bone	yarrun
blood	guma
dog	ngurra
snake	munda
kangaroo	bawurra
possum	ḏangurd
fish	guyu
spider	ḏun-ga
mosquito	buḏany
emu	gulbari
eaglehawk	guḏala
crow	waragan
sun	ḏurdu
moon	gagarda
stone	banggu
water	gamu
camp	yamba
fire	burdi
smoke	ḏuga
food	maṉḏa
meat	yurdi
stand	ḏana
sit	binda
see	naga
go	wadya
get	mara
hit, kill	guni
I	ngaya
you	yinda
one	wanggara
two	bulardu
