= Bidia =

Bidia may refer to:

- Bidia people, an ethnic group of Australia
- Bidia language, a language of Australia
- Elias Bidía, Brazilian footballer
- Bidia Dandaron, Soviet Buddhist scholar
- Bidia (food), an African swallow food

== See also ==
- Bidiya
- Bidya
