= Message stick =

Indigenous Australian communication device

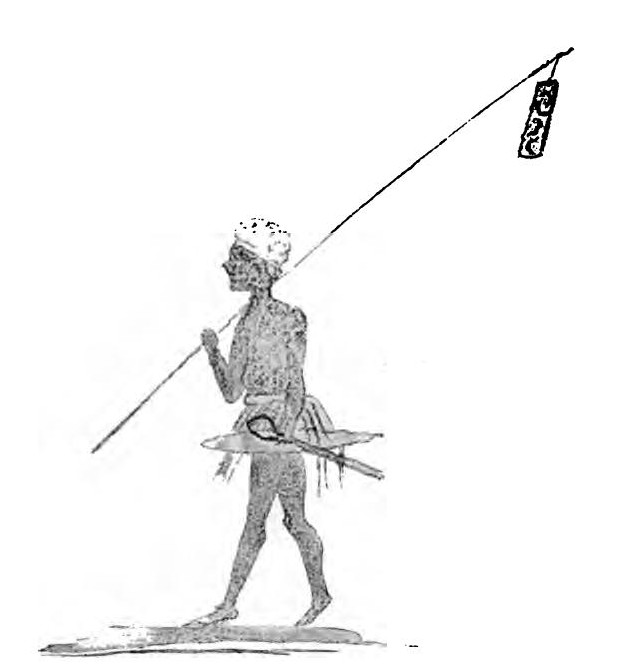
"A native carrying a message stick" image from The Euahlayi Tribe by K. Langloh Parker (1905)

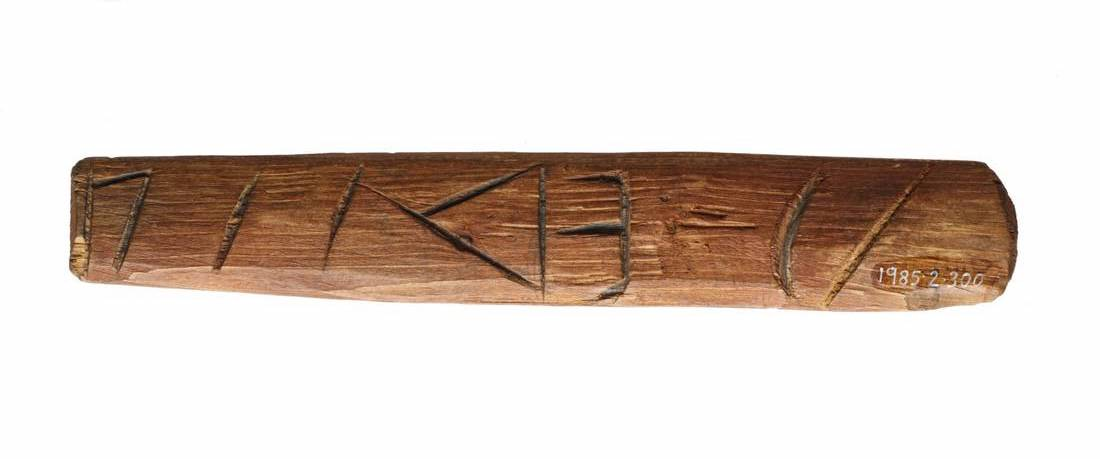
An Australian Indigenous message stick held in the National Museum of Australia

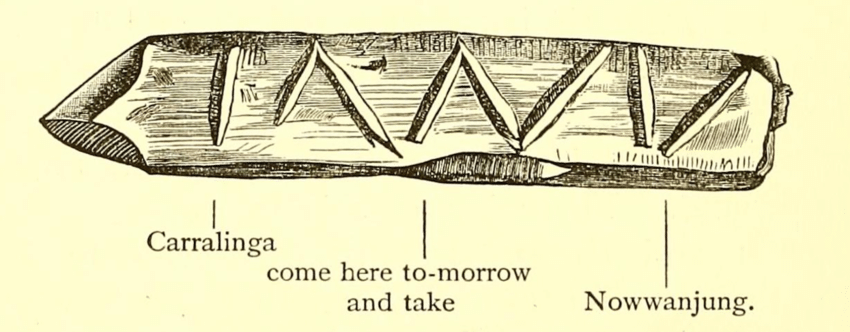
Message stick inscribed with notches and strokes and their codified meaning (Howitt, 1889)

A message stick is a public communication device traditionally used by Indigenous Australians. Although styles vary, they are generally oblong lengths of wood with motifs engraved on all sides. Message sticks were carried by designated messengers across political borders to coordinate movements of people, request resources, issue demands, and negotiate alliances. Message sticks are non-restricted since they were intended to be seen by others, often from a distance. They are nonetheless frequently mistaken for tjurungas. The term 'message stick' is also sometimes applied to similar objects made by Indigenous people of North America, housed in the Peabody Museum Harvard and the Phoebe A. Hearst Museum of Anthropology, Berkeley. The term is also used to refer to a similar system of communication used by the Punan people of Borneo.

== Description ==
Message sticks are usually a solid piece of carved wood, with a median length of 17 centimetres (6.7 in), marked with patterns and sequences of signs. Styles vary, but they are often cylindrical or flattened with tapered ends. Message sticks are occasionally finished with red or white ochre. In the Top End of Australia, the signs and patterns on message sticks may be painted as opposed to engraved. Other kinds of materials incorporated into message sticks include feathers, twine, resin and human hair.

== Terms and etymology ==
Indigenous terms for 'message stick' are recorded in approximately 57 languages of Australia, often co-lexifying with the term for 'wood'. The English term 'message stick' is a likely calque of the Norwegian budstikke, a marked rod used up until the 19th century to summon meeting participants in Norway and elsewhere in Scandinavia.

== Use ==
Traditionally, message sticks were passed between different peoples, language groups and even within clans to make alliances and to manage the movements of people and goods. They were often used to summon neighbouring groups to ceremonies, including mortuary or initiation ceremonies. Signature marks engraved on the stick could be used to identify senders and recipients, their totems or clan affiliations.

A standard interaction was triadic, involving, minimally, a sender, a messenger, and a recipient. In a prototypical case, an event or circumstance would prompt a sender to prepare a message stick. This individual would appoint a messenger and begin carving the message stick in their presence while explaining the meanings of individual marks and their relationship to elements of the message. The messenger subsequently travelled overland, or over water, with the message stick displayed in a prominent way such as hanging on the tip of a spear, in a net bag, or tucked into a headband or waist girdle. The visibility of the message stick served to identify the messenger as an envoy with ambassadorial status with the right to enter foreign territory without asking permission. Arriving at the destination the messenger delivered the stick to its recipient and reproduced the content of the message in spoken form while referring to the marks on the object. The recipient could then entrust the same messenger with a reply message to send back to the original community, or the same messenger might continue onwards to deliver the same message to a more distant community.

Message stick markings could have different meanings. Some motifs represented specific individuals or groups, while others served as decorative elements. Motifs could also represent people, geographical features, named settlements, periods of time and seasonal events. The size, shape and type of wood could also contribute to the meaning of a message stick.

== Historical accounts ==
Anthropologist Alfred Howitt wrote of the Wurundjeri people of the Melbourne area in 1889:

The oldest man (Headman) having made such a message stick hands it to the old man nearest to him, who inspects it and, if necessary, adds further marks and gives corresponding instructions. Finally, the stick having passed from one to the other of the old men present is handed to the messenger, who has received his verbal message in connection with it. If any duration of time is connected with the message, or if an enumeration of stages or camps is made, a method is used (see Australian Aboriginal enumeration) [to explain this].

Jeannie Gunn wrote about life at a station near the site of the town of Mataranka in the Northern Territory in 1902:

Then he ['Goggle-Eye'] showed me a little bit of stick with notches on it, and said it was a blackfellow's letter-stick, or, as he called it, a "yabber-stick." It was round, not flat like most other letters, and was an invitation to a corroboree; and there were notches on it explaining what sort of corroboree it was, and saying that it was to be held at Duck Creek. There was some other news marked on it...

Donald Thomson, recounting his journey to Arnhem Land after the Caledon Bay Crisis in 1935, writes of Wonggu sending a message stick to his sons, at that time in prison, to indicate a calling of a truce. In etched angles, it showed people sitting down together, with Wonggu at the centre, keeping the peace. The sticks acquired a function as a tool of diplomacy, especially in Northern Australia.

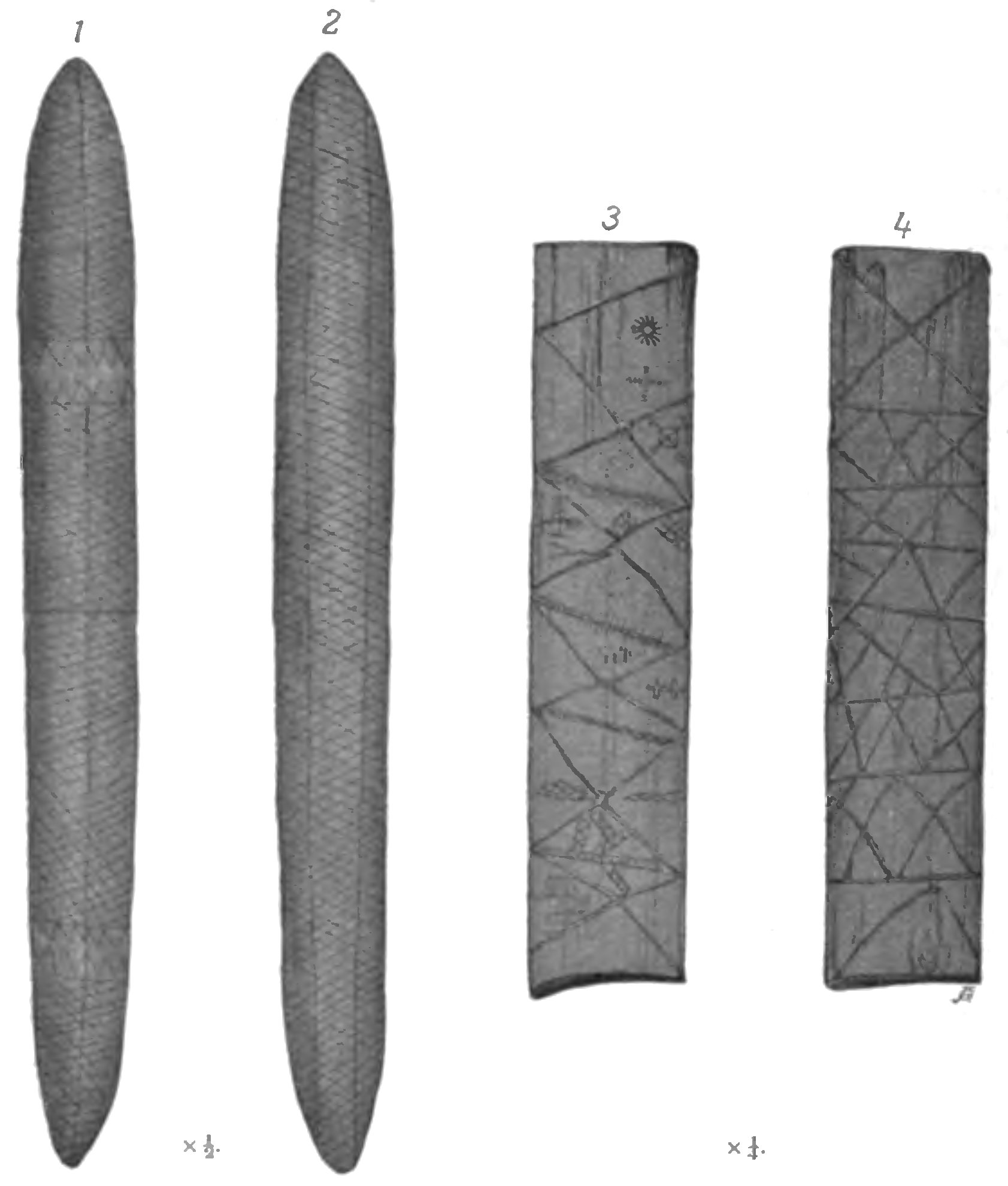

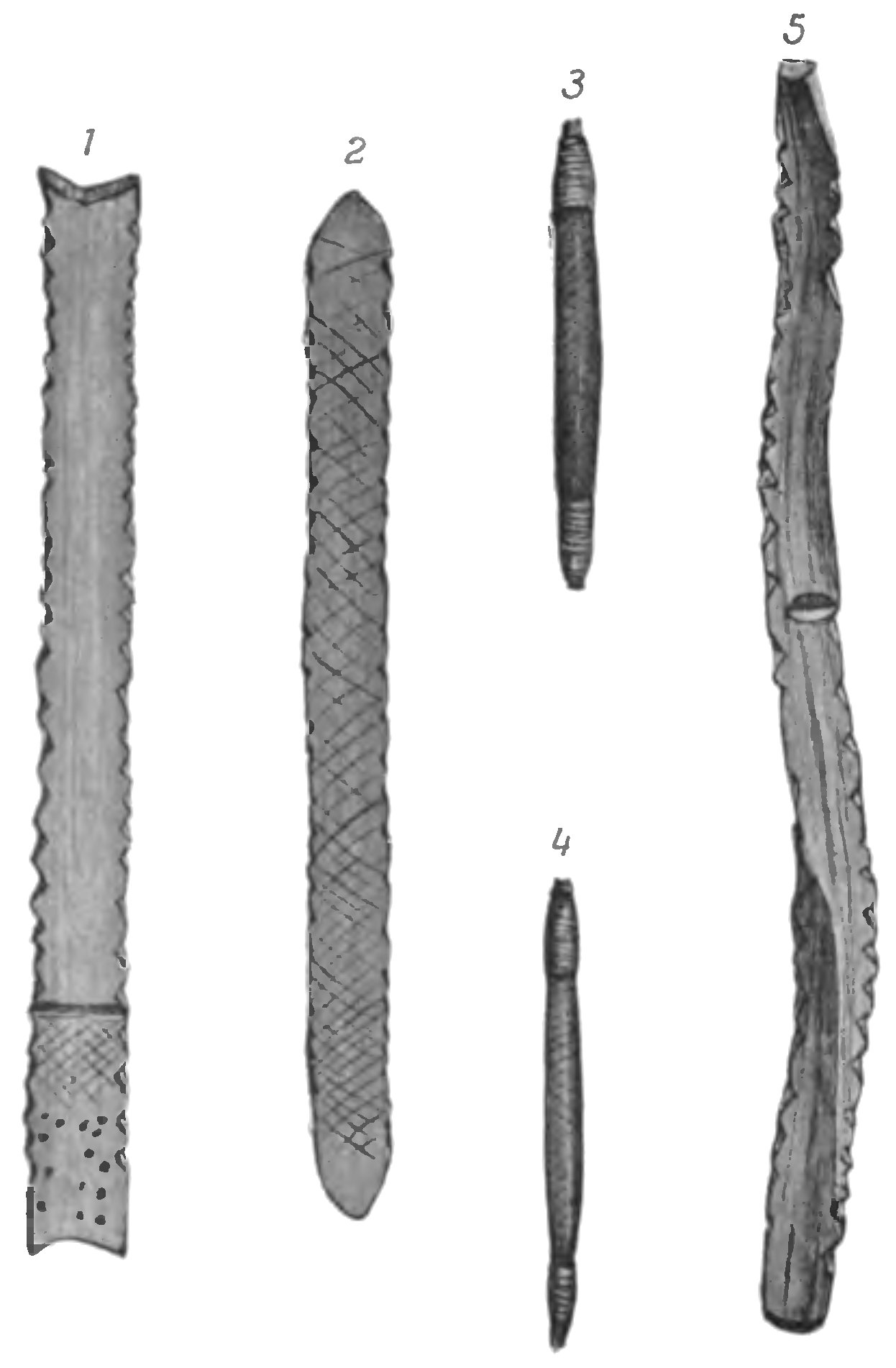

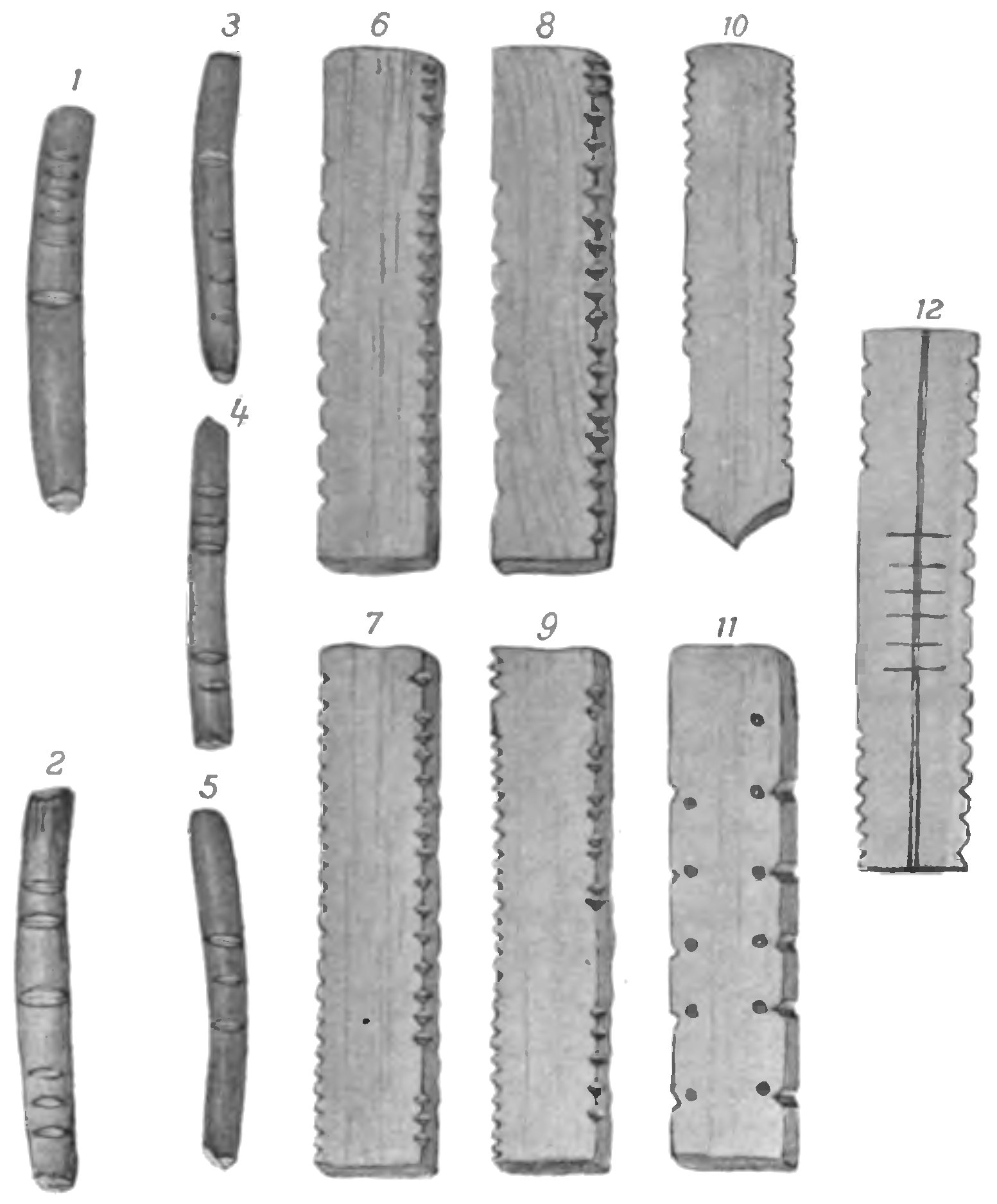

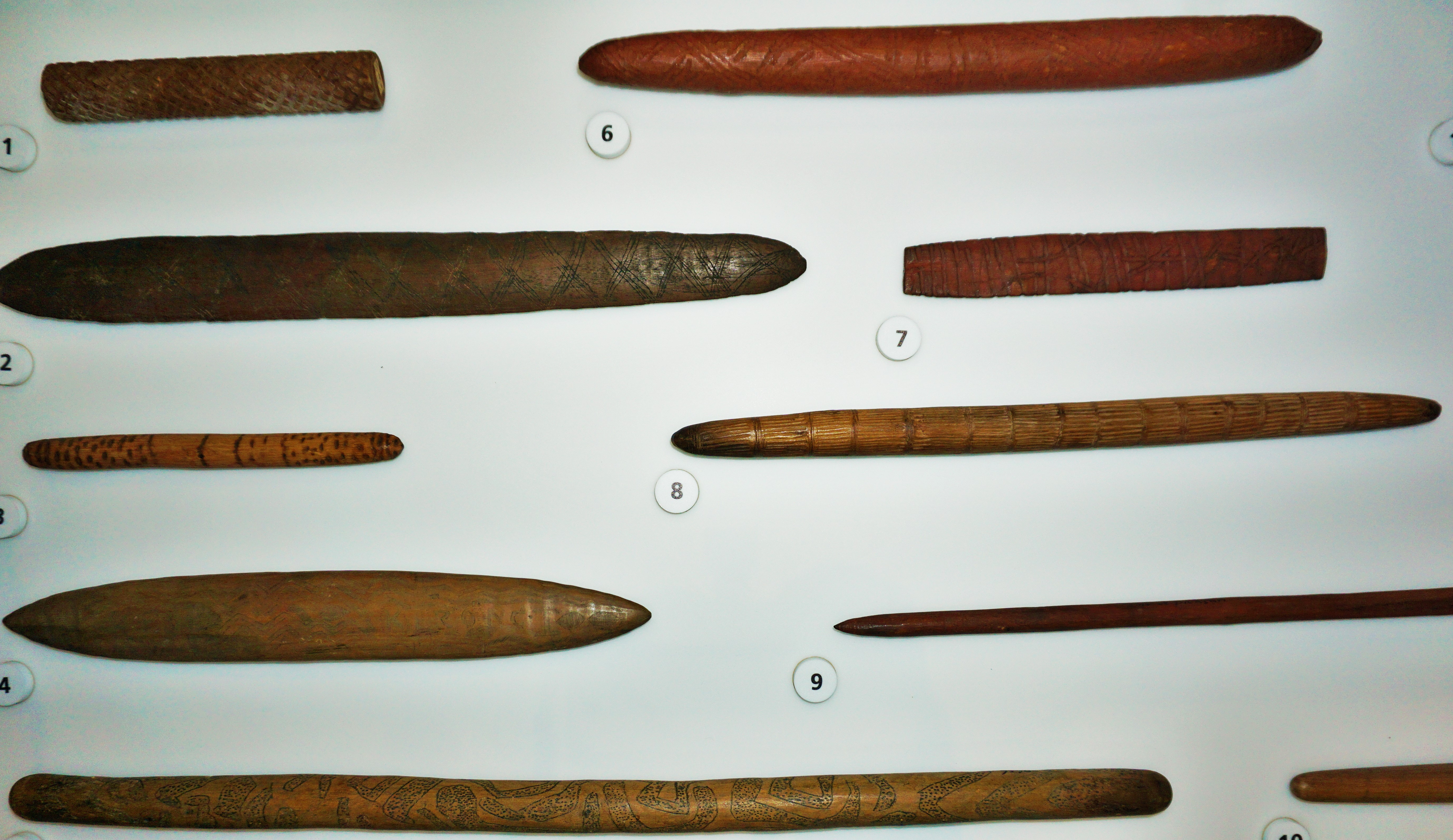

Museum Collections
Australian Museum	Aboriginal Message Sticks from the Australian Museum collection The Australian Museum holds 230 message sticks in its collection.
South Australian Museum	The South Australian Museum holds 283 message sticks in its collection.
British Museum	The British Museum holds 74 message sticks in its collection.
National Museum of Australia	The National Museum of Australia holds 53 message sticks in its collection.
Pitt Rivers Museum	The Pitt Rivers Museum holds a message stick from the 19th century made of Acacia homalophylla which originates from Queensland. Originally sent by a Yagalingu man to a Wadjalang man, it is an invitation to hunt emu and wallaby. Zig-zagged symbols carved into the wood represent ‘emu’ and the cross-hatching represent ‘wallaby’. The British Museum holds a Kalkatungu message stick, collected by Charles Handley in 1900, created to communicate the death of three children through a combination of diamond-shaped engravings.

== Modern cultural references ==
- Message Stick was an Australian TV series.
- The student newspaper of the University of New South Wales was formerly titled Tharunka, which was said to mean 'message stick' in a Central Australian dialect. In mid-2024 the publication changed its name to Gamamari after concerns about the term 'tharunka', with it having been potentially stolen or made up as a name.
- Message Stick is a business owned by Aboriginal Australians, started in 2003. It works closely with the Federal Government to influence Government policy to support economic development, including business ownership and entrepreneurialism.

== See also ==
- Australian Aboriginal enumeration
- Australian Aboriginal artefacts
- Devil's Pool, Australia
- Koori Mail
- National Indigenous Times Australia's largest circulating Indigenous affairs newspaper
