= Birria language =

Birria language may refer to:

- Biri language/Birigaba (Maric)
- Pirriya language/Bidia (Karnic)

Both are Australian languages.
