= Pirriya language =

Extinct Australian Aboriginal language

Pirriya
- Birria
- Native to: Australia
- Region: Queensland
- Ethnicity: Bidia
- Extinct: 1969, with the death of Albert Upperty (Uppity)
- Language family: Pama–Nyungan: (unclassified, possibly Karnic); Pirriya

Language codes
- ISO 639-3: xpa
- Glottolog: pirr1240
- AIATSIS: L36
- ELP: Pirriya

Pirriya (also Birria, Bidia, Kunggari, Kulumali, and Kungadutji) is an extinct and unclassified Australian Aboriginal language. It was spoken by the Bidia people (also known as Biria) of the western and central western Queensland, including Barcoo Shire, Whitula Creek, Cooper Creek, and Jundah.

== History ==
The last speaker of Pirriya was Albert Upperty (or Uppity) (1905–1969) of Keeroongooloo, who was said to be the son of Minyaling, the only (or one of the only) survivor(s) of a massacre by police and white people at Poolpirree Waterhole on Keerongooloo.

=== Documentation ===
Four sources on Pirriya exist. The first is a vocabulary published by Edward Micklethwaite Curr in his book The Australian Race. The online language database Glottolog considers "Koongerri" to be a mislabeled attestation of Pirriya. The second attestation comes from a white man, Thomas S. House, who learnt the language from Upperty and others living at Keeroongooloo, where he grew up. House sent Gavan Breen a vocabulary in 1972, directly gave vocabulary in a 1973 visit, and a notebook he had collected. About 120 words were recorded from Upperty in 1968, whose memory of Pirriya was poor then, and some "doubtful" data from the last speaker of Kuungkari, once spoken nearby to Pirriya, Arthur Winkers, in 1968.

== Classification ==
Geographically it lay between the Karnic and Maric languages, but had no obvious connection to either; the data is too poor to draw any conclusions on classification. Dixon (2002) classes Pirriya with Kungkari as a subgroup of the Maric languages while Breen (1990) suggests it may be a Karnic language.

== Phonology ==
=== Consonants ===
	Peripheral		Laminal		Apical	
	Labial	Velar	Dental	Palatal	Alveolar	Retroflex
Plosive	p	k	t̪	c	t/d	ʈ
Nasal	m	ŋ	n̪	ɲ	n	ɳ
Rhotic					r	
Lateral			(l̪)	ʎ	l	ɭ
Approximant	w			j		ɻ

The dental /l̪/ only rarely occurs.

=== Vowels ===
	Front	Central	Back
High	i iː		u (uː)
Low		a aː	

The long /uː/ is considered rare.

== Vocabulary ==
Some words from the Birria language, as spelt and written by Birria authors include:

- Billar: spear
- Binoor: bandicoot
- Boorong: rock
- Bowra: kangaroo
- Burlo moori: good day
- Gulburri: emu
- Noka: water
- Ullatah: moon
