= Kooma =

Aboriginal Australian people

The Kooma are a contemporary aggregation of Indigenous Australian peoples descending from tribes living in the border region of Queensland and New South Wales. They are descendants of the Koamu.

== Country ==
Contemporary Kooma people state their forebears lived upstream from, and to the east of, the Kunja, along parts of Nebine Creek and the Culgoa River. They call this area yumba, literally "camp" but now bearing the broader sense of "home", and the Murra murra station is of particular importance to them. Other tribes in this area, which more broadly encompasses the area beyond the middle reaches of the Nebine to take in the Warrego, Paroo, Bulloo and Wilson rivers, were the Bitjara, Kalili, Wangkumara Kunggari and Muruwari.

A special remote sitting of the Federal Court of Australia on Kooma country, at the Shire Hall in Bollon, south-west Queensland, marked the successful resolution of the Kooma people's claim for native title with a consent determination hearing.

The Kooma People's determination spans an area approximately 2,950 square kilometres in the south-west region of Queensland, and falls within the Maranoa, Balonne, Murweh and Paroo local government regions. This country includes the Bendee Downs and Murra Murra pastoral properties; and also includes other areas around Bollon. Bordering the town to of Wyandra at the north-west, spanning south to the Culgoa River, and east-west from Wideegoara Creek to Belingra. The area is of strong cultural, spiritual and historical significance for the Kooma People, and has been the focus of the Kooma People’s struggle for native title recognition.

== People ==
According to one Kooma tradition, there was one group among them, taller and of lighter skin, who appeared to have an Asiatic appearance. According to folk traditions, in the 1880s a German scientist was fascinated by a group of Kooma who were hairless, and wished to collect from them skin samples for examination. The clan refused, and yet a Kooma corpse was later reported to have been shipped back to Berlin.

== Mythology ==
The dreamtime in Kooma lore was called Matya Mundu. One tale relates how the rainbow serpent as it slithered along the Warrego River, dug out waterholes and populated them with yellow-belly, catfish, and cod.

== Sources ==
- Horwitz, Tony (2010). One for the Road. Knopf Doubleday. ISBN 978-0-307-76302-0.
- "Kooma People's Native Title Consent Determination" (PDF). 2014.
- Memmott, Paul (2007). Gunyah, Goondie + Wurley: The Aboriginal Architecture of Australia. University of Queensland Press. ISBN 978-0-702-23245-9.
- Wharton, Herb (2011). Yumba Days. University of Queensland Press. ISBN 978-0-702-24471-1.
