= Australian Aboriginal enumeration =

Counting system used by Australian Aboriginals

The Australian Aboriginal counting system was used together with message sticks sent to neighbouring clans to alert them of, or invite them to, corroborees, set-fights, and ball games. Numbers could clarify the day the meeting was to be held (in a number of "moons") and where (the number of camps' distance away). The messenger would have a message "in his mouth" to go along with the message stick.

A common misconception among non-Aboriginals is that Aboriginals did not have a way to count beyond two or three. However, Alfred Howitt, who studied the peoples of southeastern Australia, disproved this in the late nineteenth century, although the myth continues in circulation today.

The system in the table below is that used by the Wotjobaluk of the Wimmera (Howitt used this tribal name for the language called Wergaia in the AIATSIS language map). Howitt wrote that it was common among nearly all peoples he encountered in the southeast: "Its occurrence in these tribes suggests that it must have been general over a considerable part of Victoria". As can be seen in the following tables, names for numbers were based on body parts, which were counted starting from the little finger. In his manuscripts, Howitt suggests counting commenced on the left hand.

== Wotjobaluk counting system ==
Aboriginal name	literal Translation	Translation	Number
Giti mŭnya	little hand	little finger	1
Gaiŭp mŭnya	from gaiŭp = one, mŭnya = hand	the Ring finger	2
Marŭng mŭnya	from marung = the desert pine (Callitris verrucosa). (i.e., the middle finger being longer than the others, as the desert pine is taller than other trees in Wotjo country.)	the middle finger	3
Yolop-yolop mŭnya	from yolop = to point or aim	index finger	4
Bap mŭnya	from Bap = mother	the thumb	5
Dart gŭr	from dart = a hollow, and gur = the forearm	the inside of the wrist	6
Boibŭn	a small swelling (i.e., the swelling of the flexor muscles of the forearm)	the forearm	7
Bun-darti	a hollow, referring to the hollow of the inside of the elbow joint	inside of elbow	8
Gengen dartchŭk	from gengen = to tie, and dartchuk = the upper arm. This name is given also to the armlet of possum pelt which is worn around the upper arm.	the biceps	9
Borporŭng		the point of the shoulder	10
Jarak-gourn	from jarak = reed, and gourn = neck, (i.e. is, the place where the reed necklace is worn.)	throat	11
Nerŭp wrembŭl	from nerŭp = the butt or base of anything, and wrembŭl= ear	earlobe	12
Wŭrt wrembŭl''	from wŭrt = above and also behind, and wrembŭl = ear	that part of the head just above and behind the ear	13
Doke doke	from doka = to move		14
Det det	hard	crown of the head	15

A similar system but with one more place was described by Howitt for the Wurundjeri, speakers of the Woiwurrung language, in information given to Howitt by the elder William Barak. He makes it clear that once counting has reached "the top of the head. From this place the count follows the equivalents on the other side."

== Other languages ==
Language	0	1	2	3	4	5	6	7	8	9	10
Anindilyakwa		awilyaba	ambilyuma	abiyakarbiya	abiyarbuwa	amangbala					ememberrkwa
Gumulgal		urapon	ukasar	ukasar-urapon	ukasar-ukasar	ukasar-ukasar-urapon	ukasar-ukasar-ukasar				
Gurindji		yoowarni	garndiwirri	nga-rloo-doo							
Kokata		kuma	kutthara	kabu	wima	ngeria					
Kunwinjku		na-kudji	boken	danjbik	kunkarrngbakmeng	kunbidkudji					kunbidboken
Ngaanyatjarra		kutja	kutjarra	marnkurra	kutjarra-kutjarra	kutjarra-marnkurra					
Nunggubuyu		anyjabugij	wulawa	wulanybaj	wulalwulal	marang-anyjabugij		marang-anyjabugij wula			marang-anyjabugij marang-anyjabugij
Tiwi		natinga	jirara	jiraterima	jatapinta	punginingita					wamutirara
Wangka		kuja	kujarra	kujarra kuju	kujarrakujarra	marakuju	marakujarra				
Yorta Yorta		iyung	bultjubul	bultjubul iyung	bultjubul bultjubul	bultjubul bultjubul iyung					bultjubul biyin-n
Yolngu		wanggany	marrma'	lurrkun	marrma' marrma'	gong wangany					gong marrma'

== See also ==
- Wurundjeri
- Alfred Howitt

== Bibliography ==
- Howitt, A.W. 1904. The native tribes of south-east Australia. London: MacMillan and Co. Reprinted. 1996. Canberra: Aboriginal Studies Press. pp. 696–699 describe the system in Wotjobaluk, while p700-703 describe the Wurundjeri system.
