= Mandandanji =

Aboriginal Australian people

The Mandandanyi are an Aboriginal Australian people of Queensland.

== Country ==
The Mandandanji occupied 15,400 square miles (40,000 km^{2}) of tribal territory, which took in the Maranoa and Balonne rivers north of St. George. Their western extension reached as far Bollon and Wallam Creek. Their northern frontier was around Donnybrook, Orallo and Yuleba. Their eastern flank was formed by Alton and Glenmorgan. Mitchell, Roma and Surat all lay within Mandandanji territory.

== Social organisation ==
The Mandandanji were divided into groups.

- The Kogai, a northerly group, lived around the headwaters of Coogoon Creek.

== History of contact ==
The Mandandanji put up considerable resistance to white colonial encroachments on their land. They were led by a leader, Bussamarai, who was later singled out by the settler Gideon Lang as one of the cleverest Aborigines he had heard of, versatile, an orator of distinction, diplomat and warrior by turns as the occasion demanded. Known also as Eaglehawk, he developed battle tactics worthy of a general that created setbacks for the whites on several occasions of confrontation. These consisted in mustering large numbers of warriors in a deep line, with a fortified centre. The thinner flanks or wings were so deployed that any whites charging on horseback could not sight and dodge the spears thrown at them, compelling them to retreat. If the cavalry rallied back, he would have the wings of his troops fold back in to the core group of fighters. Bussamarai had also managed to form a coalition with 5 neighbouring tribes, and many outback stations had to be abandoned. The story of their struggles and defeat has been the object of an intensive study by Patrick Collins.

Eventually, already in this early period, the Mandandanji melded in with the Kunggari and these two were, in reports, often confused.

The missionary William Ridley travelled through the district of Surat in 1855, found the natives quick at learning, and friendly, though guards were required since the area was still considered dangerous.

== The theatrical performance ==
During a lull in the skirmishing, Bussamarai convened 500 members from his tribal amphictyony near Surat, in order to perform an unprecedented public corroboree before the local commissioner and other settlers. The scenography for the performance, conducted under moonlight, was established by setting the stage within the clearing of an open glade, 200 yards in diameter, which was girdled by thick stands of timber. About 100 women formed into a chorus which chanted a commentary on the sequence of mimed events, one consisting in repeating the lines fed to them by Bussamarai, who orchestrated the event. The action unfolded to the rhythmic thumping of a sack of earth with sticks, to maintain the tempo. Lang then describes the three acts the tribe stage-managed.

The first act of the corroboree was the representation of a herd of cattle, feeding out of the forest and camping on the plain, the black performers being painted accordingly. The imitation was most skillful, the action and attitude of every individual member of the entire herd being ludicrously exact. Some lay down and chewed the cud, others stood scratching themselves with hind feet or horns, licking themselves or their calves; several rubbing their heads against each other in bucolic friendliness.

The second act then began:

A party of blacks was seen creeping towards the cattle, taking all the usual precautions, such as keeping to windward, in order to prevent the herd from being alarmed. They got up close to the cattle at last, and speared two head, to the intense delight of the black spectators, who applauded rapturously. The hunters next went through the various operations of skinning, cutting up, and carrying away the pieces, the whole process being carried out with the most minute exactness.

The third and final act consisted of a pitched battle between the marauding Aborigines and the stock owners. It began:

with the sound of horses galloping through the timber, followed by the appearance of a party of whites on horseback, remarkably well got up. The face was painted whity brown, with an imitation of the cabbage-tree hat; the bodies were painted, some blue and others red, to represent the shirts: below the waist was a resemblance of the moleskin trousers, the legs being covered with reeds, tied all round, to imitate the hide leggings worn in that district as a protection against the brigalow scrub. These manufactured whites at once wheeled to the right, fired, and drove the blacks before them! the latter soon rallied, however, and a desperate fight ensued, the blacks extending their flanks and driving back the whites. The fictitious white men bit the cartridges, put on the caps, and went through all the forms of loading, firing, wheeling their horses, assisting each other, &c., with an exactness which proved personal observation. The native spectators groaned whenever a black-fellow fell, but cheered lustily when a white bit the dust; and at length, after the ground had been fought over and over again, the whites were ignominiously driven from the field, amidst the frantic delight of the natives, while Eaglehawk worked himself into such a violent state of excitement that at one time the play seemed likely to terminate in a real and deadly fight.

== Alternative names ==
- Mundaeinbura
- Mundainbara
- Kogai
- Cogai
- Fishing net people

== Some words ==
- yabo (father)
- yanga. (mother)
- yo. (yes)
- urra. (no)
- nguran (dingo)
- bilgiñ

== Sources ==
- Casey, Maryrose (2013). "Bold, Black and Brilliant: Aboriginal Australian Drama". In Wheeler, Belinda (ed.). A Companion to Australian Aboriginal Literature. Camden House. pp. 155–172. ISBN 978-1-571-13521-6.
- Collins, Patrick (2002). Goodbye Bussamarai: The Mandandanji Land War, Southern Queensland, 1842-1852. University of Queensland Press. ISBN 978-0-702-23293-0.
- Lang, Gideon S. (1865). The Aborigines of Australia. Melbourne: Wilson & Mackinnon.
- Mathews, R. H. (1897). "Bora of the Kamilaroi tribes". Proceedings of the Royal Society of Victoria. 9. Melbourne: 137–173.
- Mathews, R. H. (1899). "Divisions of Queensland aborigines". Proceedings of the American Philosophical Society. 37. Philadelphia: 327–336.
- Mathews, R. H. (1904). "Language, Organization and Initiation Ceremonies of the Kogai Tribes, Queensland". Zeitschrift für Ethnologie. 36 (1): 28–38. JSTOR 23131498.
- Ridley, William (1861). "Journal of a Missionary tour among the Aborigines of the Western Interior of Queensland, in the year 1855, by the rev. William Ridley, B.A." (PDF). In Lang, J. D. (ed.). Queensland, Australia; a highly eligible field for emigration, and the future cotton-field of Great Britain: with a disquisition on the origin, manners, and customs of the aborigines. London: E. Stanford. pp. 435–445.
- Tindale, Norman Barnett (1974). "Mandandanji (QLD)". Aboriginal Tribes of Australia: Their Terrain, Environmental Controls, Distribution, Limits, and Proper Names. Australian National University. ISBN 978-0-708-10741-6.
- Veracini, L. (2002). "Review of Goodbye Bussamarai: The Mandaranji Land War, Southern Queensland 1842-1852 by Patrick Collins". Queensland Review. 9 (1): 89–90. doi:10.1017/S1321816600002762.
