= Lynette Nixon (human rights advocate) =

Australian human rights advocate

Lynette Nixon is an Australian human rights advocate, author, and community leader. A Gunggari woman from south-west Queensland, she is recognised for her advocacy for education, traditional language, reconciliation, health, housing, and legal services for Aboriginal communities.

== Advocacy ==
Nixon was involved in establishing the Aboriginal Housing Company in 1979, serving as president, vice-president, and a committee member for many years. She developed educational resources for Aboriginal studies and introduced a language program into primary schools as a language worker for the Kombumerri Aboriginal Corporation.

Nixon is one of the authors of Binang Goonj – Bridging Cultures in Aboriginal Health, a textbook on improving the education of doctors and nurses on Aboriginal health and cultural competency.

Nixon is the director of the Gunggari Native Title Aboriginal Corporation and the founding member and Gunggari representative on the Northern Basin Aboriginal Nations (NBAN) Committee. She is a storyteller and a cultural keeper of knowledge for the Gunggari people.

Nixon, a founding member of Queensland Murray–Darling Committee's Regional Aboriginal Advisory Group (RAAG), launched the Queensland Murray–Darling Committee 'Reconciliation Action Plan – Innovate' at Goondiwindi in 2018.

== Works ==
- Eckermann, Anne-Katrin; Nixon, Lynette (2015), A place called home : the Gunggari struggle for land: a native title case study, Mt Ommaney, Qld. Cross Cultural Consultants Pty Ltd, ISBN 978-0-9942973-0-3
- Nixon, Lynette; Mailman, Dell (1999), Jurdis (Totems), UNE
- Nixon, Lynette (2000), The tiger snake (tiger bumbarra), Nalingu Aboriginal Corp
- Nixon, Lynette; Mailman, Dell (1999), The emu (nurinj), UNE
- Gray, Roy; Nixon, Lynette; Chong, Ena (1994), "Binang Goonj: Bridging Cultures in Aboriginal Health", Aboriginal and Islander Health Worker Journal, 18 (1): 14–18, ISSN 1037-3403
- Eckerman, Anne-Katrin; Dowd, Toni; Nixon, Lynette; Goolburri ATSIC Regional Council (1992), A report on the health needs of Aboriginal people in south west Queensland, November 1992, Goolburri ATSIC Regional Council
- Eckermann, Anne-Katrin (2010), Binan Goonj : bridging cultures in Aboriginal health (3rd ed.), Churchill Livingstone/Elsevier, ISBN 978-0-7295-3936-4

== Awards ==
- 2008 Queensland Domestic and Family Violence Award "Myalla Booboghun" Big Talking Women
- 2018 NAIDOC Awards - Female Elder of the Year
