= Joanne Currie Nalingu =

Australian artist

- Born: 1964 (age 61–62); Mitchell, Queensland
- Known for: painting

Joanne Currie Nalingu (born 1964) is an Aboriginal Australian artist based in Caloundra. Her painting The River is Calm won the 2008 Wynne Prize.

== Early life ==
Currie is a descendant of the Gunggari people and was born at the Mitchell Yumba's Aboriginal mission. She grew up in Amby and Brisbane.

== Art ==
Currie is a self-taught artist. She began painting in 1989 and started exhibiting in 1991. By 1994, she had received an Arts Queensland grant. In 2008, her painting The River is Calm won the Wynne Prize. That painting is in the collection of the Art Gallery of New South Wales. In 2009, she was a finalist for the Sunshine Coast Art Prize.

Lin Onus was a mentor of hers.

=== Exhibitions ===
==== Solo exhibitions ====
Currie held solo exhibitions at:

- Give 'em Currie exhibition at the Caloundra Regional Art Gallery from December 2003 till March 2004. This expansive exhibition included sixty paintings filling three art gallery spaces.
- The Jewellery and Art Gallery @ Carrington's at Noosa Junction in October 2011.

==== Group exhibitions ====
Currie's paintings were shown at FireWorks gallery alongside paintings by Vincent Serico in August 2008. These exhibitions were viewed by Quentin Bryce (then-Governor of Queensland) that same month.

Currie's work was again co-exhibited with paintings by the late Vincent Serico in Riverdays, held in April 2012 at Gympie Regional Gallery. The exhibition focused on the artists' stories of living by rivers in their early lives, and featured Currie's painted shield designs. These works were based on water forms from her home territory, Maranoa.
