= Kuungkari =

Aboriginal Australian people

The Kuungkari are an indigenous Australian people of Queensland. They are to be distinguished from the Kunggari.

== Name ==
According to an early Migrant, J. Heagney, the word kuungkari (koongerri) meant "dry".

== Country ==
The traditional tribal lands of the Kunggari occupied 14,000 square miles (36,000 km^{2}) with extensive stretches of open grasslands. They lived around the eastern bank of the Thomson and also on Cooper (Barcoo) rivers. Their western extensions ran to Jundah. The northern boundary lay at Westland and in the vicinity of Longreach. Towards the east, they took in Avington, Blackall, and Terrick Terrick. Their southern frontier ran from the western flank of the Grey Range through to Cheviot Range, Powell Creek, and Welford.

== Social organization ==
The Kuungkari were divided into at least five hordes.

- Torraburri
- Yankibura
- Mokaburra

== Initiation ==
They were one of the tribes that did not adopt the rite of circumcision into their initiatory practices.

== History of contact ==
White settlement in this area began around 1874-1878. It was estimated that at the time of first contact, the population of this area, including not only the Kuungkari, but two other tribes (the Bidia), was around 1,200. By 1883, women outnumbered the men, and an observer explained the reason:

"The women at present (1883) considerably outnumber the men, many of the latter having been shot down by the Whites and Native Police when they first established themselves in the district... Since the advent of the Whites, few children are reared—the rifle, syphilis, and debauchery having, as usual, commenced the work of extermination."

== Alternative names ==
- Koonkerri
- Kunggari
- Kungeri, Koongerri
- Yangeeberra
- Tarawalla (eastern dialect name)

== Sources ==
- Ahern, John (1887). "The Barcoo River, 40 miles West of Blackall". In Curr, Edward Micklethwaite (ed.). The Australian race: its origin, languages, customs, place of landing in Australia and the routes by which it spread itself over the continent (PDF). Vol. 3. Melbourne: J. Ferres. pp. 72–75.
- Cameron, A. L. P. (1904). "On two Queensland tribes". Science of Man. 7 (2). Sydney: 27–29.
- Dudley, Joseph I.; Williams, T. S. (1887). "Blackall-Barcoo River". In Curr, Edward Micklethwaite (ed.). The Australian race: its origin, languages, customs, place of landing in Australia and the routes by which it spread itself over the continent (PDF). Vol. 3. Melbourne: J. Ferres. pp. 76–77.
- Heagney, J. (1886). "The Junction of the Thomson and Barcoo rivers, also the Whitula Creek.". In Curr, Edward Micklethwaite (ed.). The Australian race: its origin, languages, customs, place of landing in Australia and the routes by which it spread itself over the continent (PDF). Vol. 2. Melbourne: J. Ferres. pp. 374–379.
- Howitt, Alfred William (1904). The native tribes of south-east Australia (PDF). Macmillan.
- Hyde, T. H. (1887). "Blackall-Barcoo River". In Curr, Edward Micklethwaite (ed.). The Australian race: its origin, languages, customs, place of landing in Australia and the routes by which it spread itself over the continent (PDF). Vol. 3. Melbourne: J. Ferres. pp. 78–81.
- Kelly, C. Tennant (1935). "Tribes on Cherbourg Settlement, Queensland". Oceania. 5 (4): 461–473. doi:10.1002/j.1834-4461.1935.tb00165.x. JSTOR 40327813.
- Mathews, R. H. (1898). "Divisions of Queensland aborigines". Proceedings of the American Philosophical Society. 37. Philadelphia: 327–336.
- Tindale, Norman Barnett (1974). "Kunggari (QLD)". Aboriginal Tribes of Australia: Their Terrain, Environmental Controls, Distribution, Limits, and Proper Names. Australian National University. ISBN 978-0-708-10741-6. Archived from the original on 2 July 2017.
