= Yagalingu =

Aboriginal Australian people of Queensland

The Yagalingu are an Aboriginal Australian people of the state of Queensland. Their language may have been a dialect of Bidjara.

== Country ==
According to Norman Tindale, the Yagalingu had a territorial range of some 8,000 square miles (21,000 km^{2}), south from the headwaters of the Belyando River south to Avoca. The northern reaches lay around Laglan, while to the west they ran to the Great Dividing Range. Their eastern and southern limits were at the Drummond Range.

== Social organization ==
The following clan groups are known

- Wakelbara (eel (wakel) clan, near Laglan)
- Kokleburra
- Owanburra/Kowanburra/Auanbura (upper Belyando River)

== Alternative names ==
- Wakelbara
- Kokleburra
- Owanburra
- Kowanburra
- Auanbura

== Sources ==
- "AIATSIS map of Indigenous Australia". AIATSIS. 14 May 2024.
- Chatfield, William (1886). "Natal Downs Station, Cape River" (PDF). In Curr, Edward Micklethwaite (ed.). The Australian race: its origin, languages, customs, place of landing in Australia and the routes by which it spread itself over the continent. Vol. 2. Melbourne: J. Ferres. pp. 468–479.
- Howitt, Alfred William (1904). The native tribes of south-east Australia (PDF). Macmillan.
- Muirhead, James; Lowe, Charles (1887). "Belyando" (PDF). In Curr, Edward Micklethwaite (ed.). The Australian race: its origin, languages, customs, place of landing in Australia and the routes by which it spread itself over the continent. Vol. 3. Melbourne: J. Ferres. pp. 26–33.
- Tindale, Norman Barnett (1974). "Jagalingu (QLD)". Aboriginal Tribes of Australia: Their Terrain, Environmental Controls, Distribution, Limits, and Proper Names. Australian National University Press. ISBN 978-0-708-10741-6. Archived from the original on 19 January 2018.
