= Bidia people =

Aboriginal Australian people

The Bidia, also called Biria, are an Aboriginal Australian people of the central west and western regions of the state of Queensland. Their language is known as Pirriya (also known as Biria/Birria).

== Language ==
The Pirriya language, also known as Bidia, Birria and other variations, was proposed by Gavan Breen to be one of a group he called Karnic languages. There is now some doubt about the validity of that category. Robert M. W. Dixon classifies it as one of two languages, the other being Kungkari, forming a subgroup of the Maric languages.

== Country ==
Bidia country enclosed some 4,600 square miles (12,000 km^{2}). The western frontier was around Whitula Creek, the eastern one at Keeroongooloo and the Canaway Range. The Bidia lived on the western side of the Thomson River and Cooper Creek, from Jundah across to the vicinity of Gilpeppee.

== Customs ==
The Biria were one of the tribes that practised initiatory circumcision. Tooth evulsion was imposed on males at the age of 12. The Bidia built huts out of hollowed sand, which were then strengthened by wicker-type sapling and earth mounds. Fires for cooking and warmth were then kindled inside. They fashioned fishing nets from a type of native hemp. Apart from reptiles, their diet, subject to the austerities of a harsh climate often subject to drought, was based on a staple of damper, from flour leached out of the sporocarps of nardoo and grass seeds, cooked into a damper over ashes. It was said by recently arrived settlers that the dry spell was so severe in 1876–1878 that they ate all of their children, for want of food. Marriage was monogamous, males being denied any other wife than the one they had, and the couple married in mid-adolescence. A ban existed on having children until a much later stage, around 30 years of age, a practice that made infanticide common. White observers were surprised to note that the Bidia would embrace and even kiss on meeting up after a long period of separation.

== History of contact ==
Pastoral development of their territory began in 1874, with the establishment of the Whitula Creek Station. At that time the Bidia's numbers were estimated to be roughly 500. Their longevity was noted.

== Alternative names ==
- Biria
- Birria
- Piria

== Sources ==
- Breen, Gavan (2015) [First published 2004]. Innamincka Talk: A grammar of the Innamincka dialect of Yandruwandha. Australian National University. ISBN 978-1-921-93420-9.
- Dixon, Robert M. W. (2002). Australian Languages: Their Nature and Development. Vol. 1. Cambridge University Press. ISBN 978-0-521-47378-1.
- Fraser (1886). "Junction of Thomson and Barcoo Rivers, also the Whitula Creek". In Curr, Edward Micklethwaite (ed.). The Australian race: its origin, languages, customs, place of landing in Australia and the routes by which it spread itself over the continent (PDF). Vol. 2. Melbourne: J. Ferres. pp. 374–.
- Heagney, J. (1886). "The Junction of the Thomson and Barcoo rivers, also the Whitula Creek.". In Curr, Edward Micklethwaite (ed.). The Australian race: its origin, languages, customs, place of landing in Australia and the routes by which it spread itself over the continent (PDF). Vol. 2. Melbourne: J. Ferres. pp. 374–379.
- Mathews, R. H. (1898). "Divisions of Queensland aborigines". Proceedings of the American Philosophical Society. 37. Philadelphia: 327–336.
- Tindale, Norman Barnett (1974). "Bidia (QLD)". Aboriginal Tribes of Australia: Their Terrain, Environmental Controls, Distribution, Limits, and Proper Names. Australian National University.
