= Keeroongooloo =

Pastoral lease in Queensland, Australia

Location in Queensland

Keeroongooloo, previously known as Keerongooloo or Keerongoola is a pastoral lease that operates as a cattle station in the Channel Country of South West Queensland, Australia.

== Description ==
The property occupies an area of 5,814 square kilometres (2,245 sq mi) along Cooper Creek and is able to carry a herd of approximately 15,000 cattle. It is currently owned by the Georgina Pastoral Company, a subsidiary of the Hughes Pastoral Group run by Peter Hughes and his family.

== History ==
For thousands of years the area was part of the land of the Bidia people. In the late 1860s, British pastoralist John Costello laid claim to the area which became known as the Keeroongooloo pastoral station. Costello offered up part of his lease to his cook and associate James Scanlan who named that part Springfield. Keeroongooloo itself was initially stocked by John Bligh Nutting and Robert Doyle in 1871. Nutting was an ex-Native Police officer, and after a skirmish with the Bidia people over the killing of cattle, his stockmen cleared the "niggers" (which they referred to the Bidia as) off Keeroongooloo by shooting at them. The Aboriginal population on Keeroongooloo at the time of British colonisation was estimated to be in the hundreds.

Another part of the lease, which was known as Wombinderry, was taken up by Alexander Reid of A. Reid and Company in 1871. Reid established a horse breeding enterprise at Wombinderry (also known as Wombundarry waterhole) and in early 1872, one of his stockmen named Maloney was killed by Bidia people for shooting at them and killing their dogs. Native Police troopers under Sub-Inspector James Gilmour from the Thargomindah barracks were sent out along Cooper's Creek and massacred a group of Aboriginal people in retribution.

From the 1870s up until the present-day management of the Hughes family, Keeroongooloo has had a range of owners such as John Hope, Vincent James Dowling, G. Scarfe, the Queensland Government, the Birt family and the Australian Pastoral Company.

In 1988, Slim Dusty released a song entitled Keeroongooloo Station on his Cattlemen from the High Plains album.

== See also ==
- List of ranches and stations
- List of the largest stations in Australia
