= Wadjabangai =

Indigenous Australian people of Queensland

The Wadjabangai, otherwise known as Wadjabangayi, were an Aboriginal Australian people of Queensland.

== Language ==
Wadjabangai was closely related to Bidjara.

== Country ==
Norman Tindale estimated Wadjabangai lands at 3,200 square miles (8,300 km^{2}) of sandy plains with ample tree stands. He arrived at this figure by exclusion from the known range of contiguous tribal territories whose domain borders are better known. The Wadjabangai lived in the area south of Lancevale, including Maryvale and as far as Blackall.

== Alternative names ==
- Karimari (from ka:ri, salt and mari, men)

== Sources ==
- Breen, Gavan (1990). Salvage Studies of Western Queensland Aboriginal Languages. Research School of Pacific Studies, ANU. ISBN 978-0-858-83401-9.
- Tindale, Norman Barnett (1974). "Wadjabangai (QLD)". Aboriginal Tribes of Australia: Their Terrain, Environmental Controls, Distribution, Limits, and Proper Names. Australian National University. ISBN 978-0-708-10741-6.
