= Hielaman =

Australian Aboriginal shield

A hielaman or hielamon is an Australian Aboriginal shield. Traditionally such a shield was made from bark or wood, but in some parts of Australia such as Queensland a hielaman is any shield.

== See also ==
- Gweagal shield
