= Stone and muller =

A stone and muller is a hand-operated tool used for mixing and grinding paint. The stone and muller was popular with artists and tradesmen from the late 18th through the 19th century. A stone and muller differs from a mortar and pestle in that the former consists of two flat stone surfaces which are rubbed together to create a paste, whereas the latter consists of a bowl and stick.

== See also ==
- Britannica
- Malerwerkzeug (in German)
