= Nguri people =

Indigenous Australian people of the state of Queensland

The Nguri are an indigenous Australian people of southern Queensland.

== Country ==
Nguri land centres around the north of the Maranoa River and ends at the gorges of the Chesterton Range. Norman Tindale estimated their territory at 3,500 square miles (9,100 km^{2}), covering the area running northwards from Mount Elliot and Donnybrook as far as Merivale west of the Great Dividing Range, including Hillside and Redford.

== Alternative names ==
- Ngoorie
- Gnoree

== Sources ==
- "AIATSIS map of Indigenous Australia". AIATSIS. 28 July 2023.
- Barlow, Harriott (1873). "Vocabulary of Aboriginal Dialects of Queensland". The Journal of the Anthropological Institute of Great Britain and Ireland. 2 (2): 165–175. doi:10.2307/2841159. JSTOR 2841159.
- Mathews, R. H. (1898). "Divisions of Queensland aborigines". Proceedings of the American Philosophical Society. 37 2: 327–336 and map.
- Tindale, Norman Barnett (1974). "Nguri (QLD)". Aboriginal Tribes of Australia: Their Terrain, Environmental Controls, Distribution, Limits, and Proper Names. Australian National University.
