= William Ridley (Presbyterian missionary) =

English missionary (1819–1878)

William Ridley (14 September 1819 – 26 September 1878) was an English Presbyterian missionary who studied Australian Aboriginal languages, particularly Gamilaraay.

== Early life and education ==
Ridley was born in Hartford End, Essex, England. He was educated at King's College and University of London where he graduated B.A. Dr. John Lang brought him to Australia and he arrived on the Clifton in Sydney on 19 March 1850. Ridley taught languages at the Australian College.

== Career ==
Ridley was ordained in the Scots Church by Lang in 1850, the following year he began his ministry in Dungog, New South Wales. In 1853 he began a travelling ministry in the New England region. This was extended in 1855 to include Moreton Bay where he formed the Moreton Bay Aborigines Friends' Society in February. In the same year he published Report … of a Journey Along the Condamine, Barwan and Namoi Rivers , and in 1856 published Gurre Kamilaroi: or Kamilaroi Sayings.

In 1861 he provided an opinion to the Select Committee on the Native Police Force of Queensland. This was regarding "considerations as to the means to be adopted for civilizing the Aborigines of Australia, suggested by a three-years' mission among that people."
