= Koamu =

Aboriginal Australian people

The Koamu (Guwamu) were an indigenous Australian people of the state of Queensland.

== Language ==
The Koamu language, often classified as a dialect of Bidjara, appeared to be quite similar to that spoken by the Ualarai, and some early ethnographers such as R. H. Mathews confused the two for this reason.

== Country ==
The Koamu are estimated to have ranged over 6,000 square miles (16,000 km^{2}) of tribal territory. They were on the Balonne River starting south of St. George, as far as Angledool, Hebei, and Brenda. Their western terrain extended to Bollon and Nebine Creek. Dirranbandi also was part of their territory. According to Thomas Honery, an authority on the nearby Weilwan, the Koamu also lived around the Warrego. This was rejected by Norman Tindale as beyond their western frontier.

== Mythology ==
On dying, a Koamu is met on passing into the spirit world by his yuri or totem, who then reintroduces him to all of his relations, the natural species belonging to his moiety.

The first bee was fashioned by a bat, which gummed on some cockatoo feathers to a sticky milky weed, which immediately took wing, and flew right down to Koamu territory, with the bat in hot pursuit, until it won sanctuary in a cave called Ungwari. The Koamu undertook rituals in this cavern to secure the increase of bees in their area.

== Native title ==
The descendants of the Koamu, under the name the Kooma people, had their native title rights recognized by the state of Queensland in 2014.

== Alternative names ==
- Guamu, Guwamu, Oamu
- Kuam
- Kuamu

Source: Tindale 1974, p. 175

== Sources ==
- Honery, Thomas (1878). "Wailwun Language and Traditions". Journal of the Anthropological Institute of Great Britain and Ireland. 7: 246–254. JSTOR 2841001.
- Kelly, C. Tennant (1935). "Tribes on Cherbourg Settlement, Queensland". Oceania. 5 (4): 461–473. doi:10.1002/j.1834-4461.1935.tb00165.x. JSTOR 40327813.
- "Kooma People's Native Title Consent Determination" (PDF). 2014. Archived from the original (PDF) on 15 March 2018.
- Mathews, R. H. (1902). "Languages of some native tribes of Queensland, New South Wales, and Victoria". Journal of the Royal Society of New South Wales. 36: 135–190. doi:10.5962/p.359384. S2CID 259672570.
- Tindale, Norman Barnett (1974). "Koamu (QLD)". Aboriginal Tribes of Australia: Their Terrain, Environmental Controls, Distribution, Limits, and Proper Names. Australian National University. ISBN 978-0-708-10741-6. Archived from the original on 3 July 2017.
