= Kunja people =

Aboriginal Australian people

The Kunja people are an Indigenous Australian people of southwest Queensland.

== Country ==
Norman Tindale calculated Kunja lands as spreading over some 12,000 square miles (31,000 km^{2}) of territory, centered on the Warrego River. As of 2022, the Kunja hold native title for approximately 235km^{2} of land.

== Sources ==
- "AIATSIS map of Indigenous Australia". AIATSIS. 14 May 2024.
- Tindale, Norman Barnett (1974). "Kunja (QLD)". Aboriginal Tribes of Australia: Their Terrain, Environmental Controls, Distribution, Limits, and Proper Names. Australian National University. ISBN 978-0-708-10741-6.
