= Wadjalang =

Aboriginal Australian people

The Wadjalang, also known as the Dharawala, were an indigenous Australian people of Queensland.

== Language ==
According to Norman Tindale, the vocabularies collected by E. M. Curr from two local informants, L. F. Dalhunty and James Crombie, probably are derived from the language once spoken by the Wadjalang.

== Country ==
In Tindale's estimation, the Wadjalang tribal lands encompassed some 15,000 square miles (39,000 km^{2}) taking in the headwaters of the Bulloo and Langlo rivers, and ran north from Quilpie to Northampton Downs to the east of Blackall, and to Tambo, The eastern boundaries were set at Cheepie, Burrandilla, and the Nive Downs. Also included in their traditional lands were Ambathalla and Minnie Downs.

== Customs ==
Male circumcision had no place in Wadjalang initiation ceremonies.

== Sources ==
- Breen, Gavan (1990). Salvage Studies of Western Queensland Aboriginal Languages. Research School of Pacific Studies, ANU. ISBN 978-0-858-83401-9.
- Dalhunty, L. F.; Crombie, James (1887). "Barcoo, Tambo, Mount Enniskillen, and Ravensbourne Creek" (PDF). In Curr, Edward Micklethwaite (ed.). The Australian race: its origin, languages, customs, place of landing in Australia and the routes by which it spread itself over the continent. Vol. 3. Melbourne: J. Ferres. pp. 86–89.
- Tindale, Norman Barnett (1974). "Wadjalang (QLD)". Aboriginal Tribes of Australia: Their Terrain, Environmental Controls, Distribution, Limits, and Proper Names. Australian National University. ISBN 978-0-708-10741-6.
