= Edward Micklethwaite Curr =

Anglo-Australian pastoralist

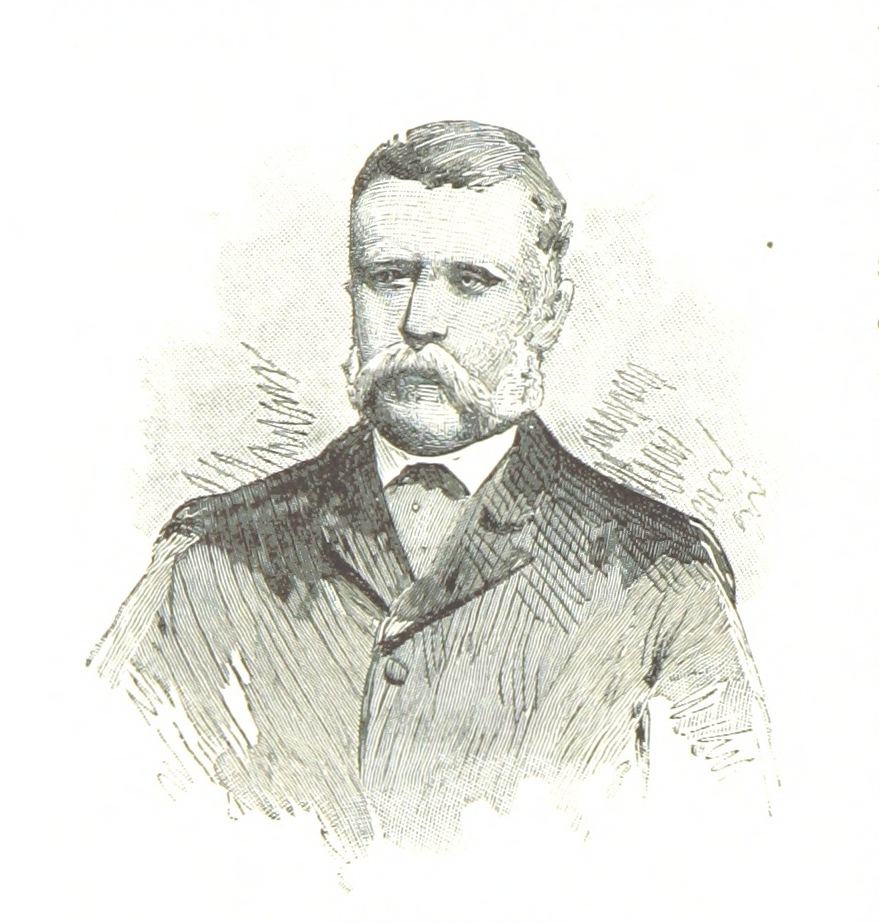
- Born: 25 December 1820; Hobart, Tasmania
- Died: 3 August 1889 (aged 68); St Kilda, Victoria

Edward Micklethwaite Curr (25 December 1820 – 3 August 1889) was an Australian pastoralist, author, advocate of Australian Aboriginal peoples, and squatter.

== Biography ==
Curr was born in Hobart, Tasmania (then known as Van Diemen's Land), the eldest of eleven surviving children of Edward Curr (1798–1850) and Elizabeth (née Micklethwaite) Curr. His parents had moved to Hobart from Sheffield, England in February 1820, where Curr's father went into business as a merchant. Curr's father left Tasmania for England in June 1823, and wrote An Account of the Colony of Van Diemen's Land principally designed for the use of Emigrants, which was published in 1824, he later returned and became the chief agent of the Van Diemen's Land Company, and in November 1827, the family moved to the Circular Head region, where the company held substantial lands.

Curr was sent to England for his schooling, and was educated at Stonyhurst College in Lancashire, from 17 December 1829 to 10 August 1837, and the following year boarded at Douai School in northern France to study French. Curr returned to Tasmania in January 1839.

Curr accompanied his father on an 1839 visit to Melbourne in the Port Phillip District (what is now the state of Victoria, which separated from New South Wales in 1851, after a campaign in which Curr's father was an important participant). From February 1841 Curr returned to the District to manage a handful of his father's sheep farming properties in northern and central Victoria, including several in the Goulburn Valley region. Curr also managed one property in a partnership with his brother William. Curr managed the properties until the end of 1850 and early 1851, when following his father's death the properties were sold.

In February 1851 Curr and two of his younger brothers sailed to England, with Curr then embarking on travel around parts of Europe and the Middle East, before marrying Margaret Vaughan of County Kildare, Ireland, on 31 January 1854. Curr returned to Victoria in August 1854, staying in Melbourne for just a month before moving to Auckland, New Zealand, where he ran a business importing Australian horses. From 1856 to 1861, Curr made two unsuccessful attempts to return to work as a pastoralist, firstly in Queensland and then around the Lachlan River in central New South Wales.

In November 1862 Curr traveled once more to Victoria, moving to a house in Chapel Street, St Kilda. In Victoria he worked as a government inspector of sheep, ultimately becoming Chief Inspector of Sheep on 17 May 1864. 1863 he published a book on Pure Saddle-Horses. Curr was promoted to chief inspector of all stock on 16 January 1871, and in this role helped to stop outbreaks of foot-and-mouth disease in 1872 and of scab disease in sheep in 1876.

Curr died in 1889 in St. Kilda, and was buried in the St Kilda General Cemetery.

== Publications and recognition ==
Curr published many reports and several books throughout his career, including Pure Saddle Horses in 1863, an account of his travels through Europe and the Middle East in the early 1850s, and The Australian Race: Its Origins, Languages, Customs in 1886, an extensive work on the Aboriginal people, their habits and their dialects, compiled from numerous reports he had elicited from settlers, missionaries and others who had direct knowledge of Indigenous peoples of Australia, and who responded to his questionnaires.

Curr also compiled the Australian Comparative Vocabulary, drawing on information from a network of farmers and rural workers who provided him with Aboriginal words matching those on a list he circulated.

The Government of Victoria, recognising its great value, undertook the publication of the Vocabulary at the expense of the State. However, his most widely known work is Recollections of Squatting in Victoria, first published in 1883 but republished as an abridged version in 1965. This work recounts Curr's experiences managing his father's properties in northern Victoria forty years earlier, including his interactions with the local Aboriginal Australians.

Curr built up a substantial collection of books during his lifetime.

== Manuscript collections ==
- Box 3X Volume 1: Australian Comparative Vocabulary by Edward M. Curr, 1881, Curr family papers and station records, 1838-1937, State Library of New South Wales, MLMSS 2286/Box 3X/vol. 1
- Box 3X Volume 2: Comparative Vocabulary of Australian Languages by Edward M. Curr, 1884, Curr family papers and station records, 1838-1937, State Library of New South Wales, MLMSS 2286/Box 3X/vol. 2
- Box 3X Volume 3: The Australian Race : its origins, languages, customs (Vol. 4) by Edward M. Curr, 1887, Curr family papers and station records, 1838-1937, State Library of New South Wales, MLMSS 2286/Box 3X/vol. 3
