= Scrubby Creek, Queensland (Blackall-Tambo Region) =

Scrubby Creek
- Suburb
- Interactive map of Scrubby Creek
- Coordinates: 25.5483°S 145.7202°E
- Country: Australia
- State: Queensland
- LGA: Blackall-Tambo Region
- Location: 126 km (78 mi) SW of Tambo; 154 km (96 mi) NNW of Charleville; 210 km (130 mi) S of Blackall; 405 km (252 mi) NW of Roma; 882 km (548 mi) WNW of Brisbane

Government
  - State electorate: Gregory
  - Federal division: Maranoa

Area
  - Total: 1,479.3 km^{2} (571.2 sq mi)

Population
  - Total: 0 (2021 census)
  - Density: 0.0000/km^{2} (0.0000/sq mi)
- Time zone: UTC+10:00 (AEST)
- Postcode: 4478
Suburbs around Scrubby Creek
Blackall	Lumeah	Bayrick
Adavale	Scrubby Creek	Ward
Langlo	Langlo	Langlo

Scrubby Creek is a rural locality in the Blackall-Tambo Region, Queensland, Australia. In the 2021 census, Scrubby Creek had "no people or a very low population".

== Geography ==
The Langlo River (a braided intermittent river) enters the locality from the north and then flows south through the locality and then forms part of the southern boundary before flowing south into Langlo. It is within the Murray–Darling basin, specifically within the catchment of the Warrego River.

The locality was named after a local creek called Scrubby Creek, which rises in the north-west of the locality and becomes a tributary of the Lango River in the cenre of the locality.

Scrubby Creek has the following mountains, all in the south-east of the locality (from north to south):

- Dingo Hill (25.6296°S 145.7911°E), rising to 440 metres (1,440 ft) above sea level
- Milky Way Hill (25.6350°S 145.9640°E), 420 metres (1,380 ft)
- Mount Morris (25.6641°S 145.7694°E), 411 metres (1,348 ft)
- Barkers Hill (25.7000°S 145.8365°E), 419 metres (1,375 ft)

The land use is grazing on native vegetation.

== Demographics ==
In the 2016 census, Scrubby Creek had a population of 5 people.

In the 2021 census, Scrubby Creek had "no people or a very low population".

== Education ==
There are no schools in Scrubby Creek, nor nearby. The alternatives are distance education and boarding school.
