= Ward, Queensland =

Ward
- Suburb
- Interactive map of Ward
- Coordinates: 25.7683°S 146.1780°E
- Country: Australia
- State: Queensland
- LGA: Shire of Murweh
- Location: 76.1 km (47.3 mi) N of Charleville; 343 km (213 mi) WNW of Roma, Queensland; 694 km (431 mi) WNW of Toowoomba; 823 km (511 mi) NWN of Brisbane

Government
  - State electorate: Warrego
  - Federal division: Maranoa

Area
  - Total: 3,426.6 km^{2} (1,323.0 sq mi)

Population
  - Total: 87 (2021 census)
  - Density: 0.02539/km^{2} (0.0658/sq mi)
- Time zone: UTC+10:00 (AEST)
- Postcode: 4470
Suburbs around Ward
Bayrick; Scrubby Creek	Lansdowne; Yandarlo	Nive
Langlo	Ward	Augathella
Cooladdi	Bakers Bend; Charleville	Gowrie Station

Ward is a rural locality in the Shire of Murweh, Queensland, Australia. In the 2021 census, Ward had a population of 87 people.

== Geography ==
The Ward River enters the locality from the north (Bayrick) and then flows south through the locality becoming a tributary of the Langlo River in the south of the locality.

Glengarry is a neighbourhood in the south of the locality (26.3°S 146.1°E).

Meecha is a neighbourhood in the far south of the locality (26.4983°S 146.1036°E).

Castle Hill is in the centre of the locality (25.9°S 146.2166°E).

The land use is almost entirely grazing on native vegetation.

== History ==
Meecha was surveyed for a town site by A. T. Macfarlane on 17 March 1891. Two of the 20 town lots were purchased on 30 January 1894 and were held until ownership was transferred to Murweh Shire Council on 30 July 1968 and then became Crown land on 15 September 1977.

The locality was officially named and bounded on 28 March 2002.

== Demographics ==
In the 2016 census, Ward had a population of 74 people.

In the 2021 census, Ward had a population of 87 people.

== Economy ==
There are a number of homesteads in the locality:

- Aubigny (25.6323°S 146.2570°E)
- Balmacarra (25.7967°S 146.0837°E)
- Barford (25.6182°S 146.3027°E)
- Binga Minor (26.4626°S 146.1072°E)
- Brumich (25.7035°S 146.2296°E)
- Buckeys Creek (25.7517°S 146.3050°E)
- Calowne (26.1568°S 146.1530°E)
- Conargo (26.4908°S 146.0974°E)
- Gleneden (25.7694°S 146.2281°E)
- Laguna (25.5737°S 146.3085°E)
- Maxvale (26.3099°S 146.0904°E)
- Millie (26.1956°S 146.1050°E)
- Molonga (26.2766°S 146.1482°E)
- Newholme (26.0708°S 146.2388°E)
- Oak Park (26.0578°S 146.1314°E)
- Oakwood (25.6787°S 146.1357°E)
- Old Gowrie (26.4859°S 146.0753°E)
- Oxford Downs (25.4119°S 146.2151°E)
- Perola Park (25.7075°S 146.3219°E)
- Southampton Downs (25.3275°S 146.3121°E)
- Thurlby (26.3648°S 146.1588°E)
- Wansey Downs (25.8513°S 146.1894°E)
- Wardsdale (26.3944°S 146.0712°E)

== Transport ==
Wanko railway station is on the Western railway line (26.5786°S 145.8915°E), but on the section from Westgate to Quilpie which has not been used since 2011. A small refreshment stand operated at Wanko station in the era when passenger rail travel to these Western locations was common.

== Education ==
There are no schools in Ward. The nearest government primary schools are Augathella State School in neighbouring Augathella to the east and Charleville State School in neighbouring Charleville to the south. The nearest government secondary school is Charleville State High School. However, some students in Ward could be too distant to attend these schools; the alternatives are distance education and boarding school.

== Amenities ==
There is a boat ramp into the Langlo River on the Diamantina Developmental Road, 20 kilometres (12 mi) southwest of Charleville (26.4935°S 146.0992°E). It is managed by the Murweh Shire Council.
