= Bayrick, Queensland =

Bayrick
- Suburb
- Interactive map of Bayrick
- Coordinates: 25.4036°S 146.0733°E
- Country: Australia
- State: Queensland
- LGA: Blackall-Tambo Region
- Location: 62.6 km (38.9 mi) SSW of Tambo; 164 km (102 mi) SSE of Blackall; 182 km (113 mi) N of Charleville; 367 km (228 mi) NW of Roma; 844 km (524 mi) WNW of Brisbane

Government
  - State electorate: Gregory
  - Federal division: Maranoa

Area
  - Total: 916.9 km^{2} (354.0 sq mi)

Population
  - Total: 16 (2021 census)
  - Density: 0.0175/km^{2} (0.0452/sq mi)
- Time zone: UTC+10:00 (AEST)
- Postcode: 4478
Suburbs around Bayrick
Lumeah	Lansdowne	Lansdowne
Lumeah	Bayrick	Ward
Scrubby Creek	Ward	Ward

Bayrick is a rural locality in the Blackall-Tambo Region, Queensland, Australia. In the 2021 census, Bayrick had a population of 16 people.

== Geography ==
The Ward River enters the locality from the north (Lansdowne) and flows south through the locality, exiting to the south (Ward) where it becomes a tributary of the Warrego River.

Ward Road enters the locality from the north (Lansdowne) and travels south, running loosely parallel to the west of the Ward River, before exiting to the south (Ward).

The land use is grazing on native vegetation.

== Demographics ==
In the 2016 census, Bayrick had a population of 9 people.

In the 2021 census, Bayrick had a population of 16 people.

== Education ==
There are no schools in Bayrick. The nearest government school is Tambo State School (Prep to Year 10) in Tambo to the north. However, only students living in the north of Bayrick would be able to attend this school due to the distances involved. Also, there are no nearby schools providing education to Year 12. The alternatives are distance education and boarding school.
