= Scrubby =

Scrubby may refer to:

== Fictional characters ==
- Scrubby, in the 1923 play Outward Bound and the film adaptations Outward Bound (1930) and Between Two Worlds (1944)
- Scrubby, a sidekick in the children's television show Popeye Playhouse
- Scrubby, a villain in the 1995 video game Biomechanical Toy
- Scrubby, a fairy in the PlayStation games of the Creatures video game series
- Scrubby, an advertising character for Scrubbing Bubbles

== Places ==
- Scrubby Creek, a tributary of Slacks Creek in Browns Plains, Queensland, Australia
- Scrubby Mountain, Blackall, Queensland
- Scrubby Knoll, site of Turkish headquarters during the landing at Anzac Cove in the World War I Gallipoli campaign

== See also ==
- Scrubby Mountain, Queensland, Australia, a rural locality
- Scrubby Creek, Queensland (Blackall-Tambo Region), a locality in Queensland
- Scrubby Creek, Queensland (Gympie Region), a locality in Queensland
- Scrubland, a plant community characterized by vegetation dominated by shrubs
