= Langlo River =

Langlo
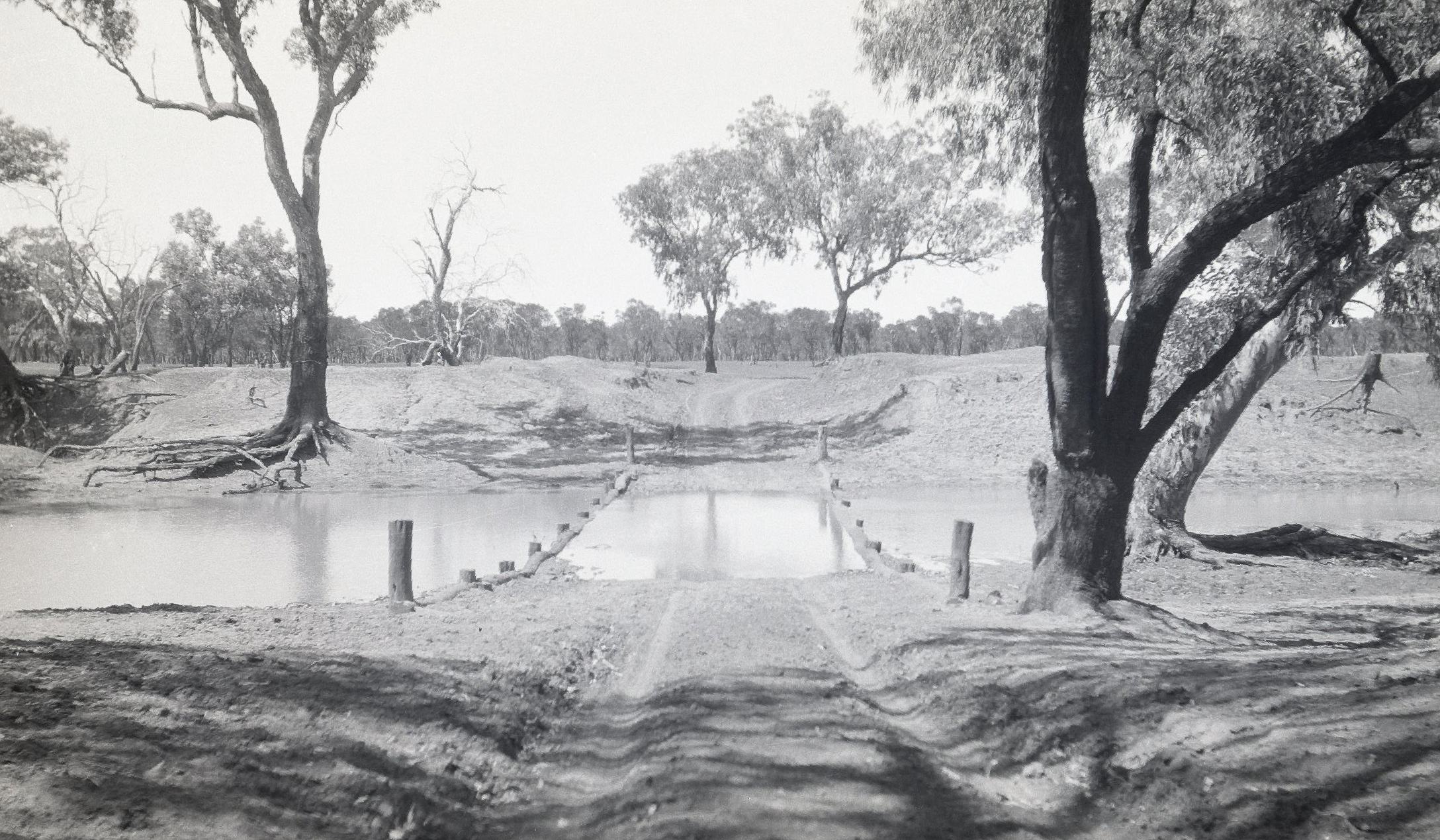
- Langlo River crossing between Charleville and Adavale, 1923

- Location of Langlo River mouth in Queensland

Location
- Country: Australia
- State: Queensland
- Region: South West Queensland

Physical characteristics
- Source: Edinburgh Range
  - location: northwest of Augathella
  - coordinates: 25°17′48″S 145°41′29″E
  - elevation: 372 m (1,220 ft)
- Mouth: confluence with Warrego River
  - location: southwest of Charleville
  - coordinates: 26°32′45″S 146°07′12″E
  - elevation: 280 m (920 ft)
- Length: 440 km (270 mi)

Basin features
- River system: Darling River catchment, Murray–Darling basin
- Tributaries
  - left: Ward River

The Langlo River, a river that is part of the Murray-Darling basin, is located in South West Queensland, Australia.

== Location and features ==
The headwaters of the Langlo River rise under the Edinburgh Range near Lumeah and northwest of Augathella. The river flows generally in a southerly direction and forms a series of braided channels flowing through mostly uninhabited plains past Baykool and Nungil. It veers to the southeast near Lynton Hills and crosses the Diamantina Developmental Road near Meecha before reaching its confluence with the Warrego River. The Langlo River is joined by seventeen tributaries including the Ward River and descends 92 metres (302 ft) over its 440-kilometre (270 mi) course.

The river's catchment is mostly composed of natural downs country, mostly used for grazing cattle and sheep, vegetated with Flinders and Mitchell grass, interspersed stony ridges and red stony plains and bisected by numerous creeks. The underlying geology is Middle Cretaceous sandstone with areas of limestone and mudstone.

== See also ==
- List of rivers of Australia § Queensland
