= Nive, Queensland =

Nive
- Suburb
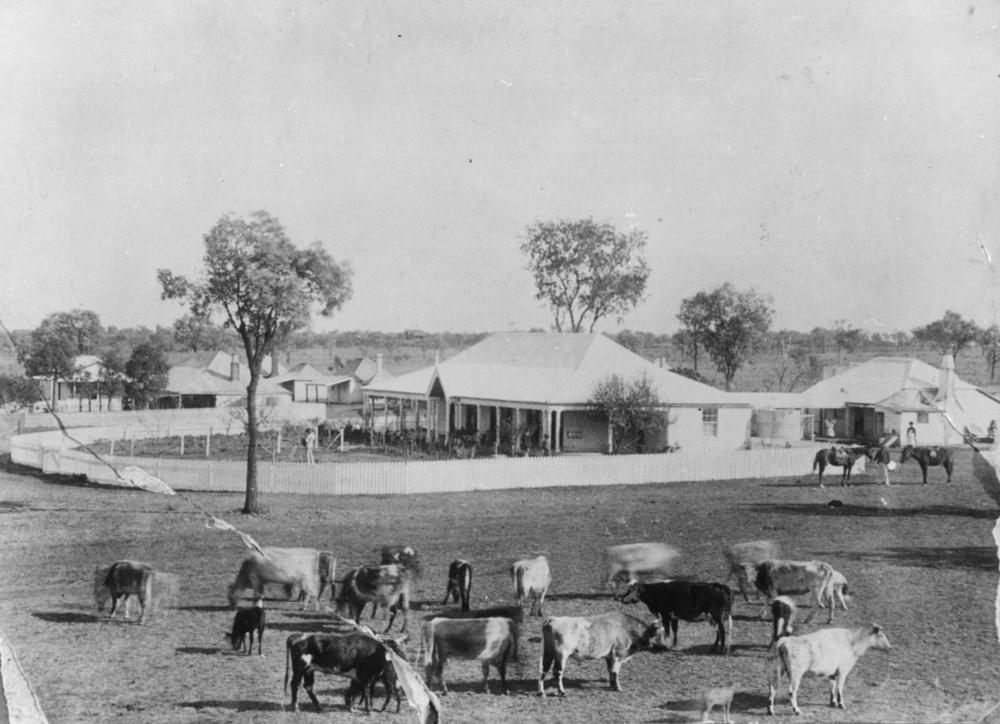
- Homestead and outbuildings at Nive Downs pastoral station, 1892

- Interactive map of Nive
- Coordinates: 25.4652°S 146.52°E
- Country: Australia
- State: Queensland
- LGA: Shire of Murweh
- Location: 52.3 km (32.5 mi) N of Augathella; 135 km (84 mi) NE of Charleville; 320 km (200 mi) NW of Roma; 671 km (417 mi) WNW of Toowoomba; 798 km (496 mi) WNW of Brisbane

Government
  - State electorate: Warrego
  - Federal division: Maranoa

Area
  - Total: 1,760.4 km^{2} (679.7 sq mi)

Population
  - Total: 44 (2021 census)
  - Density: 0.02499/km^{2} (0.0647/sq mi)
- Time zone: UTC+10:00 (AEST)
- County: Nickavilla
Suburbs around Nive
Yandarlo	Yandarlo	Caldervale
Ward	Nive	Upper Warrego
Ward	Augathella	Caroline Crossing

Nive is a rural locality in the Shire of Murweh, Queensland, Australia. It is on the boundary between the Shire of Murweh and the Blackall-Tambo Region. In the 2021 census, Nive had a population of 44 people.

== Geography ==
The Landsborough Highway runs through from south (Augathella) to north (Yandarlo).

== History ==
The locality takes its name from the Nive River. The river in turn was named by Sir Thomas Mitchell, the New South Wales Surveyor-General, on 13 September 1846, after the Nive River in south-western France, where Lord Wellington engaged in the Battle of the Nive in the Peninsula War in 1813.

Nive Downs was a huge sheep station that was broken up into home blocks and allocated to returned servicemen in a ballot after the 2nd world war.

The Duttons sold Nive Downs in 1866 and awarded a breastplate to Paddy, King of Nive Downs for the service of his tribe. Paddy was likely a Wadjalang man. The breastplate is now in the National Museum of Australia.

== Demographics ==
In the 2016 census, Nive had a population of 34 people.

In the 2021 census, Nive had a population of 44 people.

== Education ==
There are no schools in Nive. The nearest government primary school is Augathella State School in neighbouring Augathella, although some parts of the north and west of Nive might be too distant for a daily commute. There are no secondary schools nearby. The alternatives are distance education and boarding school.
