= Nive River =

Nive River may refer to:

- Nive River, France, a tributary of the Adour River
- Nive River (Queensland), Australia, a tributary of the Warrego River
- Nive River (Tasmania), Australia, a tributary of the River Derwent
