= David Landsborough III =

English physician, missionary, and pioneer in Taiwan

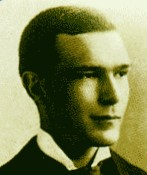
David Landsborough III

David Landsborough III (Chinese: 蘭大衛; 2 August 1870 - 1957) was an English physician, missionary, and pioneer in Taiwan (then known as Formosa). He founded the Changhua Christian Hospital in 1896. Along with James Laidlaw Maxwell and Reverend George Leslie Mackay, Landsborough was one of the foremost medical missionaries in Taiwan.

== Early life and education ==
Landsborough was born in Scotland to a religious family. His grandfather, Reverend David Landsborough I, and his father, David Landsborough II, were respected scientists and priests. Landsborough III received his bachelor's degree and master's degree from Glasgow University, graduating at 20 years old in 1890. He spent the next five years at the University of Edinburgh Medical School studying General Surgery.

== Taiwan ==
In December 1895, Landsborough was assigned to the Presbyterian mission in Taiwan to replace Gavin Russell who died from typhoid. He embarked from London and spent 3 months traveling to Taiwan. Upon arrival, Landsborough spent many months learning Taiwanese in Tainan before settling down in Changhua. There, he founded the Changhua Christian Hospital and established it as one of the first teaching hospitals on the island. This began the 68 year Landsborough medical missionary legacy in Taiwan.

To his students and the local community, Landsborough became known as Dr. Lan (蘭醫生). Landsborough worked to improve the hospital by expanding the facility to accommodate more patients and trainees. He also introduced a running water system.

In 1916 with the outbreak of World War I, Landsborough returned home to England. The Changhua Christian Hospital was temporarily shut down due to the war during this time. In 1919, Landsborough came back to Taiwan and reopened the hospital with new equipment and increased local assistance.

=== Family life ===
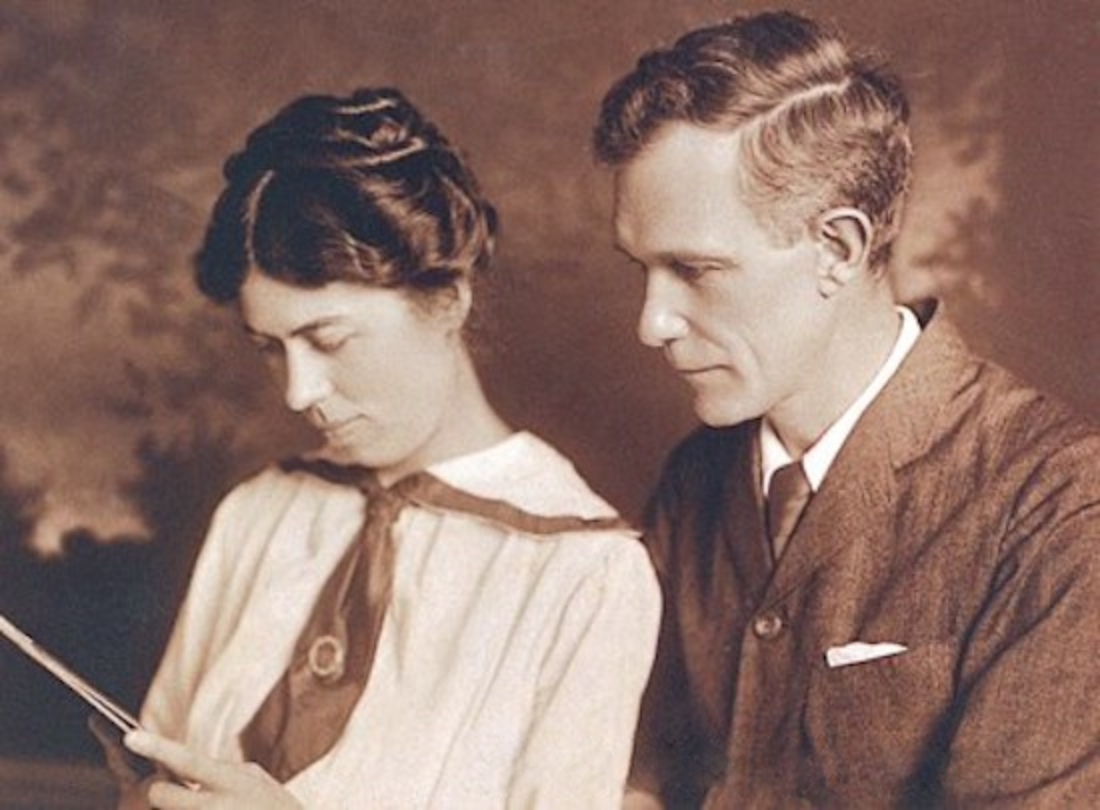
Marriage of David Landsborough III and Marjorie Learner

On 12 November 1912 Landsborough married Marjorie Learner (1884–1985), another missionary serving in Taiwan. On 16 December 1914 Marjorie Learner gave birth to their son, David Landsborough IV (1914–2010). Their daughter Jean Landsborough (1918–1988) was born in England on 18 November 1918. The Landsboroughs raised their children in Taiwan and the two grew up speaking Taiwanese.

=== "The Love Surrounding the First Skin Graft in Taiwan" ===
In 1928, a poor 13-year-old boy, Chou Chin-Yao (周金耀), fell off a rock in Changhua. As a result, Chou developed serious skin ulcers around his right knee, a condition that could require amputation without treatment. With no other options, Landsborough decided to perform an unprecedented surgery. Marjorie Learner volunteered to give some of her skin to Chou and Landsborough grafted four pieces of his wife's thigh onto Chou, the first skin-graft in Taiwanese history.

With no references, Landsborough pioneered allografting in Taiwan and was one of the first to perform allografting in history. Although the donation ultimately failed due to Chou's body rejecting the grafted tissue, Chou survived, recovered from his condition and did not require an amputation. Years later, Chou became a missionary under the Landsboroughs. Regarding the surgery, Chou said: "Though the piece of skin could not be grafted onto my body, it is sewn in my heart."

== Legacy ==
Landsborough left Taiwan for the last time on 1 March 1936 and returned to England. His son, David Landsborough IV, continued his missionary work for decades after. David Landsborough III died in 1957.

In 1958, Tsung-Ming Tu invited Marjorie Learner to tell the story of "The Love Surrounding the First Skin Graft in Taiwan" to the students at Kaohsiung Medical School. Artist Shih-Chiao painted a piece depicting the story that is hung up at Kaohsiung Medical School as a professional model for students to use today.
