= Yandarlo, Queensland =

Yandarlo
- Suburb
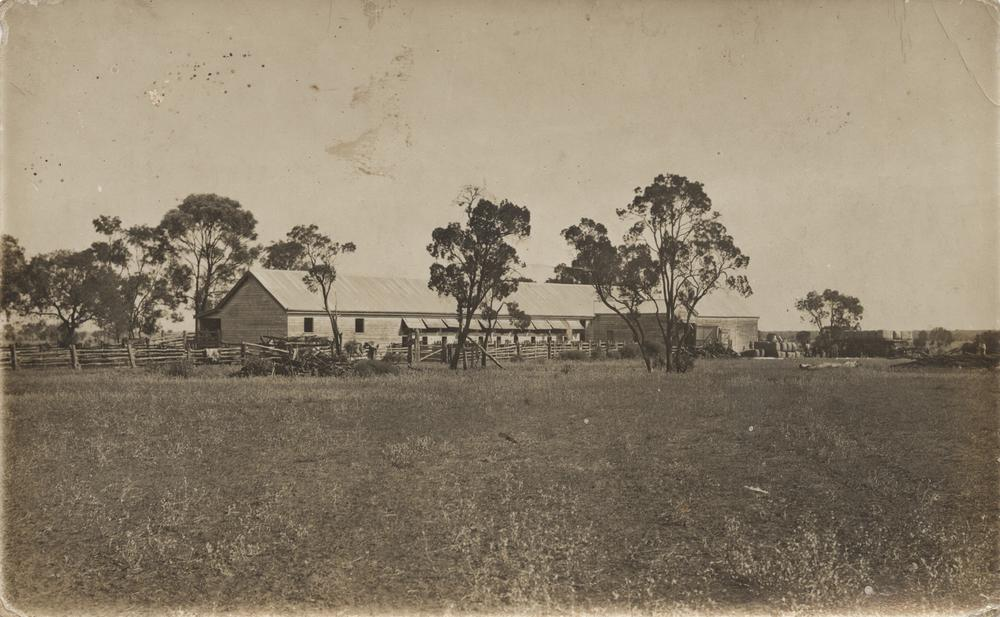
- Woolsheds at Yandarlo Station, circa 1924

- Interactive map of Yandarlo
- Coordinates: 25.1252°S 146.4938°E
- Country: Australia
- State: Queensland
- LGA: Blackall-Tambo Region
- Location: 43.0 km (26.7 mi) SE of Tambo; 94.0 km (58.4 mi) SE of Blackall; 343 km (213 mi) NW of Roma; 820 km (510 mi) WNW of Brisbane

Government
  - State electorate: Gregory
  - Federal division: Maranoa

Area
  - Total: 1,318 km^{2} (509 sq mi)

Population
  - Total: 39 (2021 census)
  - Density: 0.0296/km^{2} (0.0766/sq mi)
- Time zone: UTC10 (AEST)
- Postcode: 4478
Suburbs around Yandarlo
Tambo	Caldervale	Caldervale
Lansdowne	Yandarlo	Caldervale
Ward	Nive	Nive

Yandarlo is a rural locality in the Blackall-Tambo Region, Queensland, Australia. In the 2021 census, Yandarlo had a population of 39 people.

== Geography ==
The Landsborough Highway enters the locality from the south-east (Nive) and exits to the north-west (Tambo).

The Nive River enters the locality from the north (Caldervale) and flows south through the locality, exiting to the south (Nive).

The land use is grazing on native vegetation.

== Demographics ==
In the 2016 census, Yandarlo had a population of 18 people.

In the 2021 census, Yandarlo had a population of 39 people.

== Education ==
There are no schools in Yandarlo. The nearest government primary and secondary school is Tambo State School (Early Childhood to Year 10) in neighbouring Tambo to the north-west; however, this school would be too distant for some students in Yandarlo. Also, there are no nearby schools offering education to Year 12. The alternatives are distance education and boarding school.
