= Caldervale =

Caldervale may refer to:

- Caldervale, Queensland, a locality in the Blackall-Tambo Region, Queensland, Australia
- Calder Valley line, a railway line in Northern England, previously known as the Caldervale line
- Caldervale, also known as 'Fin Me Oot', a former mining village near Blantyre, South Lanarkshire in Scotland

== See also ==
- Calderdale
