= Lansdowne, Queensland =

Lansdowne
- Suburb
- Interactive map of Lansdowne
- Coordinates: 25.1308°S 146.1647°E
- Country: Australia
- State: Queensland
- LGA: Blackall-Tambo Region
- Location: 21.5 km (13.4 mi) S of Tambo; 123 km (76 mi) SE of Blackall; 407 km (253 mi) NW of Roma; 885 km (550 mi) NW of Brisbane

Government
  - State electorate: Gregory
  - Federal division: Maranoa

Area
  - Total: 912.6 km^{2} (352.4 sq mi)

Population
  - Total: 36 (2021 census)
  - Density: 0.0394/km^{2} (0.1022/sq mi)
- Time zone: UTC+10:00 (AEST)
- Postcode: 4478
Suburbs around Lansdowne
Macfarlane	Tambo	Yandarlo
Minnie Downs	Lansdowne	Yandarlo
Lumeah	Bayrick	Ward

Lansdowne is a rural locality in the Blackall-Tambo Region, Queensland, Australia. In the 2021 census, Lansdowne had a population of 36 people.

== Geography ==
The Landsborough Highway passes to the north-east, but does not enter the locality.

The Ward River is formed by the confluence of Larry Creek and Rams Gully in Lansdowne (25.11454°S 146.22240°E), after which the river flows south, exiting the locality to the south (Bayrick).

The land use is predominantly grazing on native vegetation with a small amount of crop growing.

== Demographics ==
In the 2016 census, Lansdowne had a population of 11 people.

In the 2021 census, Lansdowne had a population of 36 people.

== Education ==
There are no schools in Lansdowne. The nearest government school is Tambo State School (Early Childhood to Year 10) in neighbouring Tambo to the north. There are no schools nearby providing schooling to Year 12; the options are distance education and boarding school.
