= William Landsborough =

Australian explorer and public servant (1825–1886)

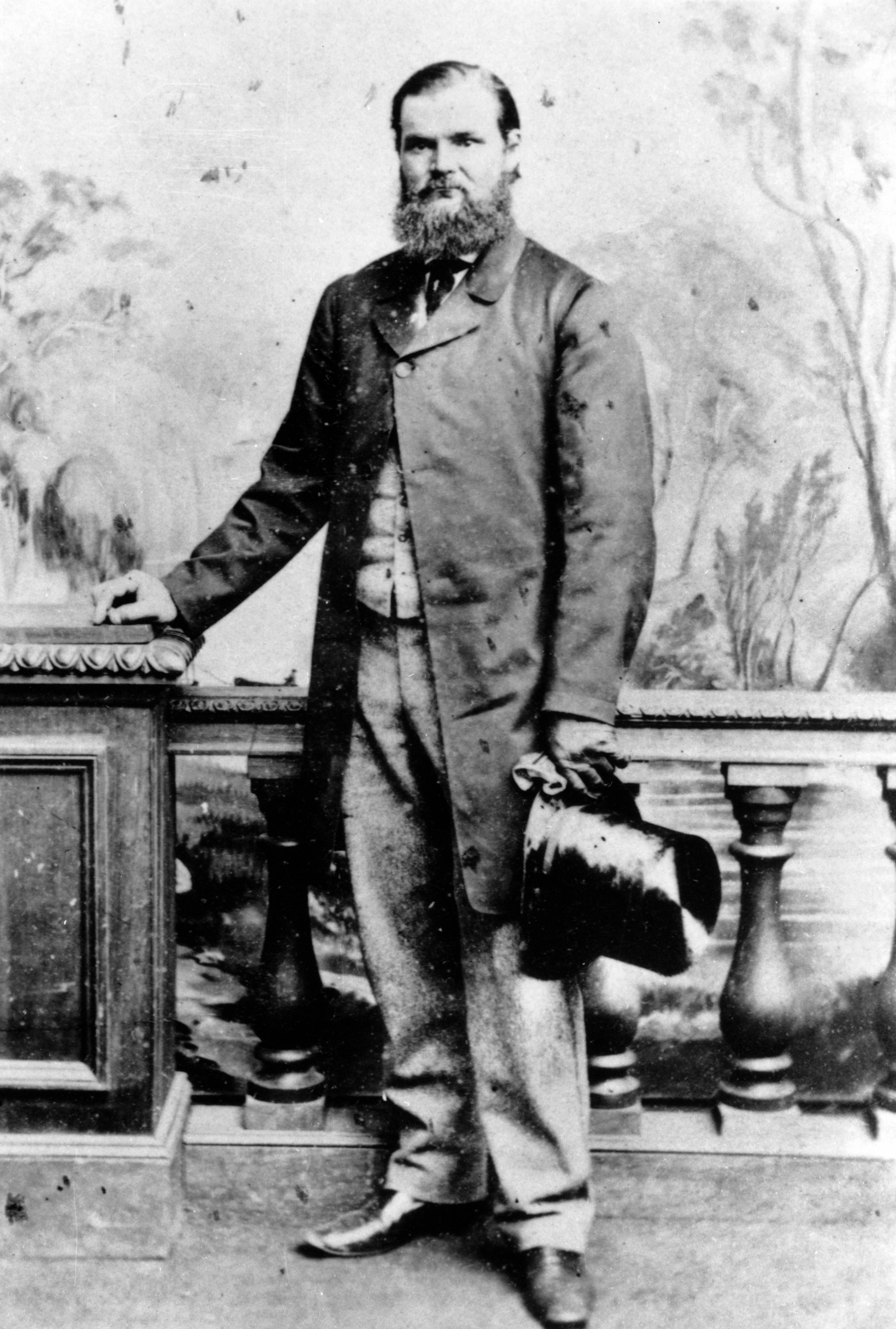

Member of the Queensland Legislative Council
- In office 20 December 1862 – 11 May 1865
- In office 17 May 1865 – 23 September 1865

Personal details
- Born: 21 February 1825 Stevenston, Ayrshire, Scotland
- Died: 16 March 1886 (aged 61) Caloundra, Queensland, Australia
- Resting place: Toowong Cemetery
- Spouse(s): Caroline Hollingworth Raine (m.1862 d.1869), Maria Theresa Carr (m.1873 d.1921)
- Relations: David Landsborough (father)
- Children: 6
- Occupation: Explorer, Public servant

William Landsborough (21 February 1825 – 16 March 1886) was an explorer of Australia. He was notable for being the first explorer to complete a North-to-South crossing of Australia. He was a member of the Queensland Legislative Council.

== Biography ==
Landsborough was born on 21 February 1825, in Stevenston, Ayrshire, Scotland, the son of David Landsborough and his wife Margaret (née McLeish). Landsborough was educated in Irvine and migrated to Australia in 1842, several years after his brothers James and John.

At that time, this was the most northerly coastal settlement along the eastern seaboard of Australia and it was here that Landsborough began his career as an explorer. Between 1856 and 1861, each year when the shearing season was over, he explored north and west, each time deeper into unknown territory. He preferred to travel in a small group usually with one or two friends and an Aboriginal tracker. As Thomas Welsby later wrote, "A sequel to Landsborough's expeditions was the race for the magnificent, pastoral country described by him".

In August 1861, he was placed in charge of one of the four parties sent out to search for the lost explorers, Burke and Wills.

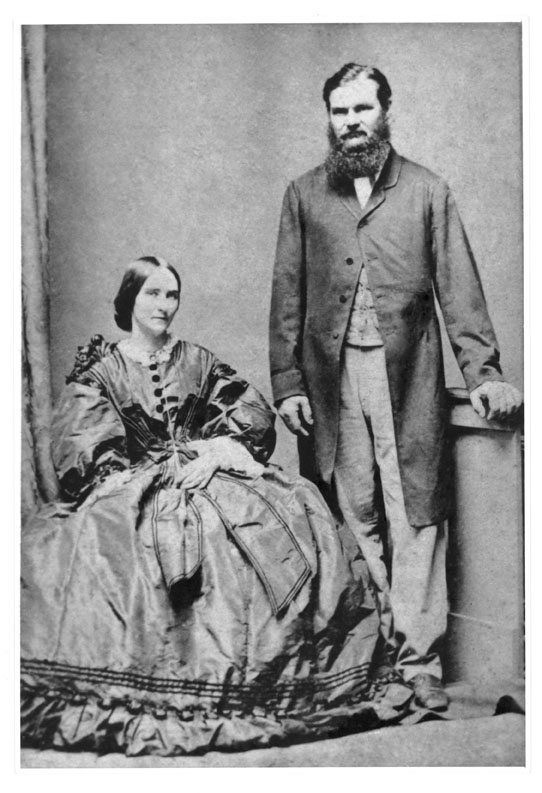
Landsborough and his wife Caroline, c. 1862

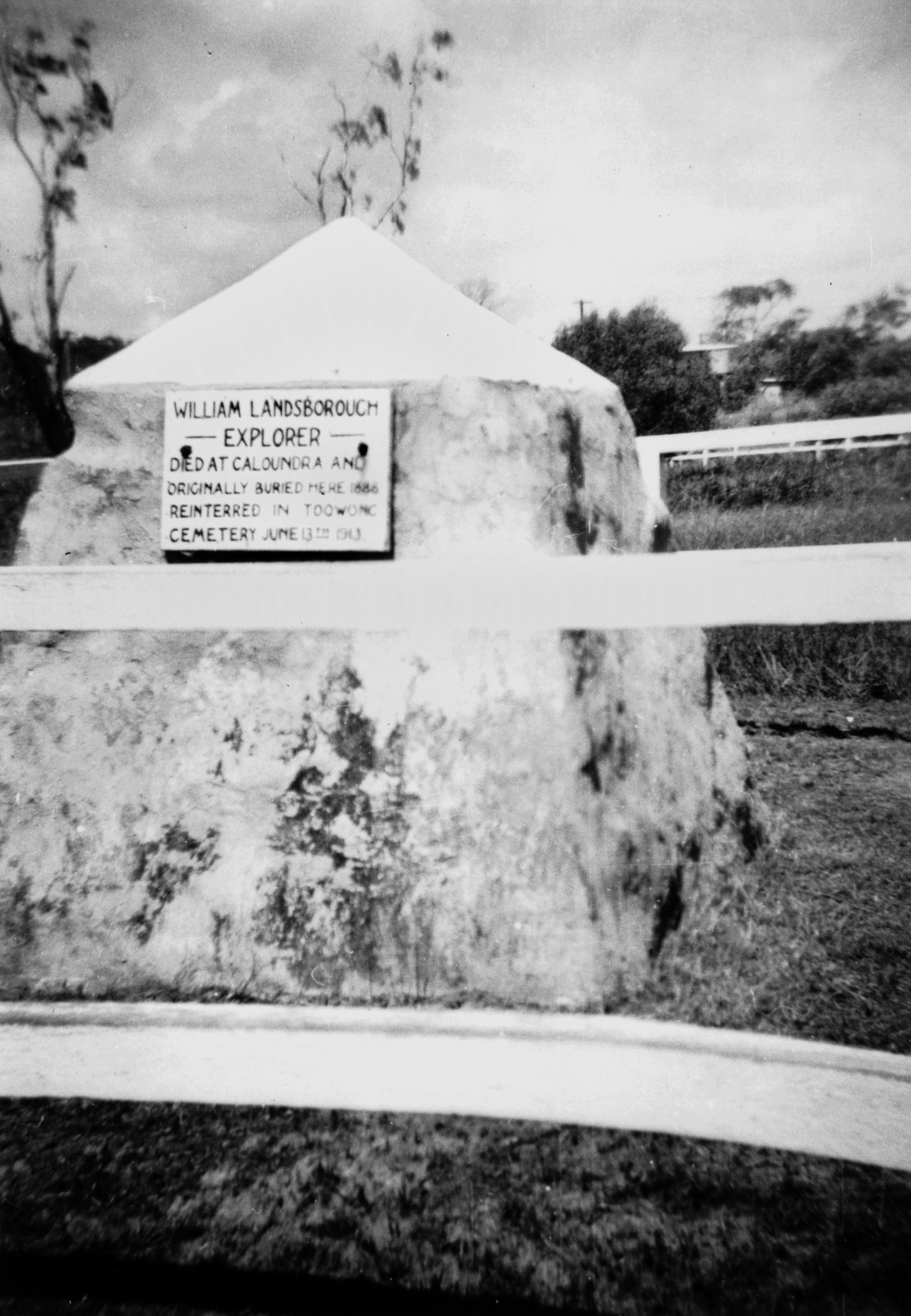
Burial stone for William Landsborough, Caloundra

William and his wife Caroline returned to Australia in late 1864 to discover that while they were away their property in Broad Sound, Glen Prairie, had been sold under mysterious circumstances. The Landsborough River Company was also experiencing financial difficulties. In 1869, after years of drought and with facing increasing debt, Landsborough finally handed over his shareholdings in the company to Morehead and Young.

Landsborough was made a Life Member of the Queensland Legislative Council in 1865 but served for only one session. Looking for employment, towards the end of 1865 he was appointed Commissioner of Crown Lands, Police Magistrate and Sub Collector of Customs for the district of Burke in the Gulf country. Finding the township of Burketown riddled with fever, he made Sweers Island in the Gulf of Carpentaria his headquarters. His wife and two children joined him soon afterwards, living on Sweers Island, and from there he did much local exploring.

In 1882, the Queensland parliament voted Landsborough £2000 for his services as an explorer, and with this he purchased a pastoral property near present-day Caloundra which he named Loch Lamerough. He died and was buried there in March 1886. On 13 June 1913, his widow had him reburied at Toowong Cemetery in Brisbane.

== Legacy ==
Landsborough was in the vanguard of exploration in northern and eastern Queensland in the middle of the 19th century, his explorations resulting in the opening up of vast areas of northern and north-eastern Australia to settlement. As a result, there are numerous places named after Landsborough, including:

- County of Landsborough, New South Wales
- County of Landsborough, Queensland in Shire of Cloncurry
- Town of Landsborough in Sunshine Coast Region
- Town and parish of Landsborough, Victoria
- Parish of Landsborough in Flinders Shire
- Landsborough Highway, stretching between Morven and Cloncurry

as well as a number of streets, creeks and mountains in Australia and also in New Zealand.

The William Landsborough Diaries (1856–1886), held by the State Library of Queensland, were ranked #39 in the "Top 150: Documenting Queensland" exhibition which toured taround Queensland from February 2009 to April 2010, as part of the Q150 celebrations, marking the 150th anniversary of the separation of Queensland from New South Wales. The exhibition was part of Queensland State Archives' events and exhibition program.

In 1957, a memorial stone was erected in the Nebo Shire to honour Landsborough.

A number of heritage-listed sites are associated with Landsborough's explorations, including:

- Landsborough Tree in Burketown, Queensland
- Landsborough's Blazed Tree (Camp 67) on Mitchell Highway, Charleville, Queensland
- Landsborough's Blazed Tree (Camp 69), 29 km south of Charleville off the Mitchell Highway near Bakers Bend

== Sources ==
- Serle, Percival (1949). "Landsborough, William". Dictionary of Australian Biography. Sydney: Angus & Robertson.
- Landsborough, William (1862). Journal of Landsborough's expedition from Carpentaria, in search of Burke & Wills : with a map showing his route. Melbourne: Bailliere.
- Landsborough, William; Laurie, James Stuart (1866). Landsborough's Exploration of Australia from Carpentaria to Melbourne, with especial reference to the settlement of available country. London: Thomas Murby.
