= Caldervale, Queensland =

Caldervale
- Suburb
- Interactive map of Caldervale
- Coordinates: 24.9227°S 146.8241°E
- Country: Australia
- State: Queensland
- LGA: Blackall-Tambo Region
- Location: 80.8 km (50.2 mi) E of Tambo; 264 km (164 mi) NE of Charleville; 449 km (279 mi) NW of Roma; 927 km (576 mi) WNW of Brisbane

Government
  - State electorate: Gregory
  - Federal division: Maranoa

Area
  - Total: 2,936.8 km^{2} (1,133.9 sq mi)

Population
  - Total: 0 (2021 census)
  - Density: 0.00000/km^{2} (0.0000/sq mi)
- Time zone: UTC+10:00 (AEST)
- Postcode: 4478
Suburbs around Caldervale
Windeyer	Mantuan Downs	Carnarvon Park
Tambo	Caldervale	Upper Warrego
Yandarlo	Nive	Upper Warrego

Caldervale is a rural locality in the Blackall-Tambo Region, Queensland, Australia. In the 2021 census, Caldervale had "no people or a very low population".

== Geography ==
The ridge of the Great Dividing Range passes through Caldervale and creates a drainage divide. The north and south of the locality are within the Warrego River drainage basin which becomes part of the Murray-Darling basin which enters the Southern Ocean at Lake Alexandrina in South Australia. The west of the locality is within the Cooper Creek drainage basin which ultimately ends at Lake Eyre. The east of the locality is within the Fitzroy River drainage basin which flows into the Coral Sea south of Rockhampton. The Pluto Timber Reserve is in the east of the locality.

== History ==
In March 1881, the Caldervale pastoral station of 25 square miles (65 km^{2}) was forfeited by its previous owner and sold to J. & R. Winton.

Malta Provisional School opened in 1881 and closed in 1883. Malta is the name of the parish and a pastoral property in the west of Caldervale. When it was sold by Joseph Henry Hoddinott to Edward Goddard Blume in 1924, the Caldervale pastoral station had an area of 430 square miles (1,100 km^{2}) and carried 2,000 head of cattle.

In 1934, the cattle station was quarantined due to an outbreak of pleuro-pneumonia among the cattle.

In 2014, Caldervale station, along with other pastoral properties owned by the Hughes family, became certified for its organic Wagyu beef production.

== Demographics ==
In the 2016 census, Caldervale had a population of 11 people.

In the 2021 census, Caldervale had "no people or a very low population".

== Education ==
There are no schools in Caldervale. Tambo State School is neighbouring Tambo to the east provides primary schooling and secondary schooling to Year 10, but, given the size of Caldervale, it may too distant from some parts of the locality for a daily commute. Also, there is no nearby school offering secondary schooling to year 12. For both reasons, other options include distance education and boarding school.
