= Langlo =

- Suburb
- Interactive map of Langlo
- Coordinates: 26.0394°S 145.7280°E
- Country: Australia
- State: Queensland
- LGA: Shire of Murweh
- Location: 109 km (68 mi) NW of Charleville; 376 km (234 mi) WNW of Roma; 904 km (562 mi) WNW of Toowoomba; 854 km (531 mi) WNW of Brisbane

Government
  - State electorate: Warrego
  - Federal division: Maranoa

Area
  - Total: 4,812.4 km^{2} (1,858.1 sq mi)

Population
  - Total: 34 (2021 census)
  - Density: 0.00707/km^{2} (0.01830/sq mi)
- Time zone: UTC+10:00 (AEST)
- Postcode: 4470
- County: Langlo County, Queensland
Suburbs around Langlo
Blackall	Scrubby Creek	Ward
Adavale	Langlo	Ward
Cooladdi	Ward	Ward

Langlo is a rural locality in the Shire of Murweh, Queensland, Australia. In the 2021 census, Langlo had a population of 34 people.

== Geography ==
The land use is grazing on native vegetation.

== History ==
Langlo Crossing Provisional School opened on 9 September 1907. On 1 January 1914, it became Langlo Crossing State School. It closed on 2 July 1937. The school was on Adavale Road (approx 26.12557°S 145.67228°E).

== Demographics ==
In the 2016 census, Langlo had a population of 56 people.

In the 2021 census, Langlo had a population of 34 people.

== Education ==
There are no schools in Langlo. The nearest government primary and secondary schools are Charleville State School and Charleville State High School in Charleville to the south-east. However, for the more remote parts of Langlo, these schools are too distant for a daily commute and the options are distance education and boarding school.
