= David Landsborough =

David Landsborough (11 August 1779 – 12 September 1854) was a Scottish minister of the Free Church of Scotland and an amateur naturalist.

== Early life and education ==
Landsborough was born at Dalry, Glen Kens, Galloway, on 11 August 1779. He was educated at the Dumfries Academy, and from 1798 at the University of Edinburgh. Here, partly by his skill as a violinist, he made the acquaintance of Thomas Brown, the metaphysician, and of the Rev. John Thomson of Duddingston, 'the Scottish Claude Lorraine,' from whom he derived a taste for painting.

== Career ==
Landsborough became tutor in the family of Lord Glenlee at Barskimming in Ayrshire, was licensed for the ministry of the Church of Scotland in 1808, and in 1811 was ordained minister of Stevenston, Ayrshire. Landsborough was a typical parson-naturalist, who, in addition to his clerical duties, and while maintaining his scholarship by reading some Latin, Greek, Hebrew, French, or Italian daily, early commenced the study of the natural history of his parish and that of the neighbouring island of Arran. Arran was the subject of his first book, a poem in six cantos, published in 1828. (It was again published in 1847, together with (twenty-four) Excursions to Arran, with reference to the Natural History of the Island.)

At the disruption of the Scottish church in 1843 he joined the Free Church of Scotland, and became minister at Saltcoats but the change involved a reduction of income from 350l., to 120l. a year, and the loss of his garden, to which he was much attached. Its place was taken by the seashore, and many hundred sets of algæ prepared by his children under his direction were sold to raise a fund of 200l. in support of the church and schools.

== Botanical studies ==
He began his botanical studies with flowering plants, afterwards proceeding in succession to algæ, lichens, fungi, and mosses. His discovery of a new alga, Ectocarpus Landsburgii Harvey (synonym of Ectocarpus fasciculatus Harvey), brought him into communication with William Henry Harvey, to whose 'Phycologia Britannica' he made many contributions. The discovery of new marine animals, such as the species of Æolis and Lepralia that bear his name, introduced him to George Johnston of Berwick.

For many years he kept a daily register of the temperature, wind and weather, and noted the first flowering of plants and the arrival of migratory birds. He also studied land mollusca and the fossil plants of the neighbouring coal-field, one of which, Lyginodendron Landsburgii, bears his name. In 1837 he furnished the account of his parish of Stevenston to the 'Statistical Account' of the parishes of Scotland.

In 1849 Landsborough was elected an associate of the Linnean Society, and in the following year he was mainly instrumental in the establishment of the Ayrshire Naturalists' Club.

== Books ==
In 1845 he contributed a series of articles on 'Excursions to Arran' to 'The Christian Treasury,' and in 1847 they appeared in book form as Excursions to Arran, Ailsa Craig, and the two Cumbraes, together with a reprint of Arran. A Poem in Six Cantos. They were again published in 1851 under the title Excursions to Arran, Ailsa Craig, and the two Cumbraes, with reference to the Natural History of these Islands. To which are added Directions for Laying out Seaweeds and Preparing them for the Herbarium.

On Harvey's recommendation Landsborough was employed to write a Popular History of British Seaweeds, and the work, on its appearance in 1849, was so satisfactory, that he was commissioned to prepare a similar Popular History of British Zoophytes or Corallines, which was published in 1852.

He visited most parts of Scotland and Ireland on ministerial duty, and found opportunities of journeying through England and France. In 1852, when upwards of seventy-three, he visited Gibraltar and Tangier, returning by way of the Balearic Isles, Marseilles, Genoa, Turin, and Paris. He reached London, after five months' absence, just in time to witness Wellington's funeral.

== Death ==
An epidemic of cholera broke out in his district in 1854. Landsborough was most assiduous in visiting the sick and dying, but was himself attacked by the disease, and succumbed, after a very brief illness at Saltcoats on 12 September 1854. Landsborough is said to have discovered nearly seventy species of plants and animals new to Scotland, and thus well earned the title of 'the Gilbert White of Ardrossan.' He received the degree of D.D. from an American college in 1849. Besides the species already mentioned, in New Zealand genus of algæ was dedicated to him by Harvey as Landsburgia. Landsborough married in 1817 Margaret, daughter of James M'Leish of Port Glasgow, by whom he had four sons and three daughters. One son, William, an Australian explorer; and another, David, free kirk minister of Kilmarnock. has edited the work on Arran. with a memoir of the writer (Ardrossan. 1875, 8vo).

In addition to the works above mentioned, of which the Popular History of British Seaweeds reached a third edition in 1857, Landsborough published 'Ayrshire Sketches, or Memoirs of J. Charters, H. Cuninghame, and J. Baird,' 1839. 18mo: a series of religious biographies. His contributions to the Annals and Magazine of Natural History and to The Zoologist deal with phosphorescence, the habits of the rook, and the pliocene and post-pliocene deposits at Stevenston.

== Family ==
In 1817 he married Margaret McLeish.

His daughter Isabella Landsborough married the Rev Arthur Thomson of the Free Church.

His son Rev David Landsborough LLD (1826-1912) was also a Free Church minister, serving at the Henderson Church in Kilmarnock.

His grandson Dr. David Landsborough III was a pioneer medical missionary in Taiwan.

His son William was a significant early explorer of Australia and there are numerous places in Australia named after Landsborough, including:

County of Landsborough, New South Wales

County of Landsborough, Queensland in Shire of Cloncurry.

Town of Landsborough in Sunshine Coast Region.

Town and parish of Landsborough, Victoria

Parish of Landsborough in Flinders Shire.

Landsborough Highway, stretching between Morven and Cloncurry

as well as a number of streets, creeks and mountains in Australia and also in New Zealand.

The small town of Camooweal in North East Queensland near the Northern Territory border had a water hole named Lake Francis after his daughter.

== Bibliography ==
- Landsborough, Rev. David (1828). Arran. A poem in six cantos. Edinburgh / London: William Blackwood / T. Cadell.
  - republished as: —— (1847). Arran. A poem in six cantos. Excursions to Arran. Edinburgh / London: John Johnstone. (published together with: Excursions to Arran: with reference to the Natural History of the Island)
- —— (1849). A Popular History of British Sea-weeds, Comprising Their Structure, Fructification Specific Characters, Arrangement, and General Distribution, With Notices of Some of the Fresh-water Algae. London: Reeve, Benham and Reeve.
  - second edition: 1852 BHL
  - third edition: 1857: BHL and see also: digital copy in HathiTrust Digital Library and digital copy in Wellcome Library.
- —— (1851). Excursions to Arran, Ailsa, Craig and the two Cumbraes, with reference to the Natural History of these Islands. To which are added Directions for Laying out Seaweeds and Preparing them for the Herbarium. Edinburgh / London: Johnstone and Hunter / Robert Theobald.
- —— (1852). A Popular History of British Zoophytes, or Corallines. London: Reeve and Co.

== Sources ==
- Allen, David Elliston (1994). The Naturalist in Britain. A Social History. Princeton, N.J.: Princeton University Press. ISBN 0-691-03628-4. (2nd ed.; 1st ed. 1976)
- Armstrong, Patrick (2000). The English Parson-naturalist: A Companionship Between Science and Religion. Leominster: Gracewing. ISBN 978-0-85244-516-7.
- Boulger, George Simonds (1892). "Landsborough, David" . In Lee, Sidney (ed.). Dictionary of National Biography. Vol. 32. London: Smith, Elder & Co.
