= Lumeah, Queensland =

Lumeah
- Suburb
- Interactive map of Lumeah
- Coordinates: 25.2866°S 145.6722°E
- Country: Australia
- State: Queensland
- LGA: Blackall-Tambo Region
- Location: 81.9 km (50.9 mi) SW of Tambo; 165 km (103 mi) S of Blackall; 468 km (291 mi) NW of Roma; 819 km (509 mi) NW of Toowoomba; 947 km (588 mi) WNW of Brisbane

Government
  - State electorate: Gregory
  - Federal division: Maranoa

Area
  - Total: 1,184.2 km^{2} (457.2 sq mi)

Population
  - Total: 0 (2021 census)
  - Density: 0.0000/km^{2} (0.0000/sq mi)
- Time zone: UTC+10:00 (AEST)
- Postcode: 4478
Suburbs around Lumeah
Blackall	Minnie Downs	Lansdowne
Blackall	Lumeah	Bayrick
Blackall	Scrubby Creek	Bayrick

Lumeah is a rural locality in the Blackall-Tambo Region, Queensland, Australia. In the 2021 census, Lumeah had "no people or a very low population".

== Demographics ==
In the 2016 census, Lumeah had "no people or a very low population".

In the 2021 census, Lumeah had "no people or a very low population".

== Education ==
There are no schools in Lumeah, nor nearby. The alternatives are distance education and boarding school.
