= Augathella =

- Town
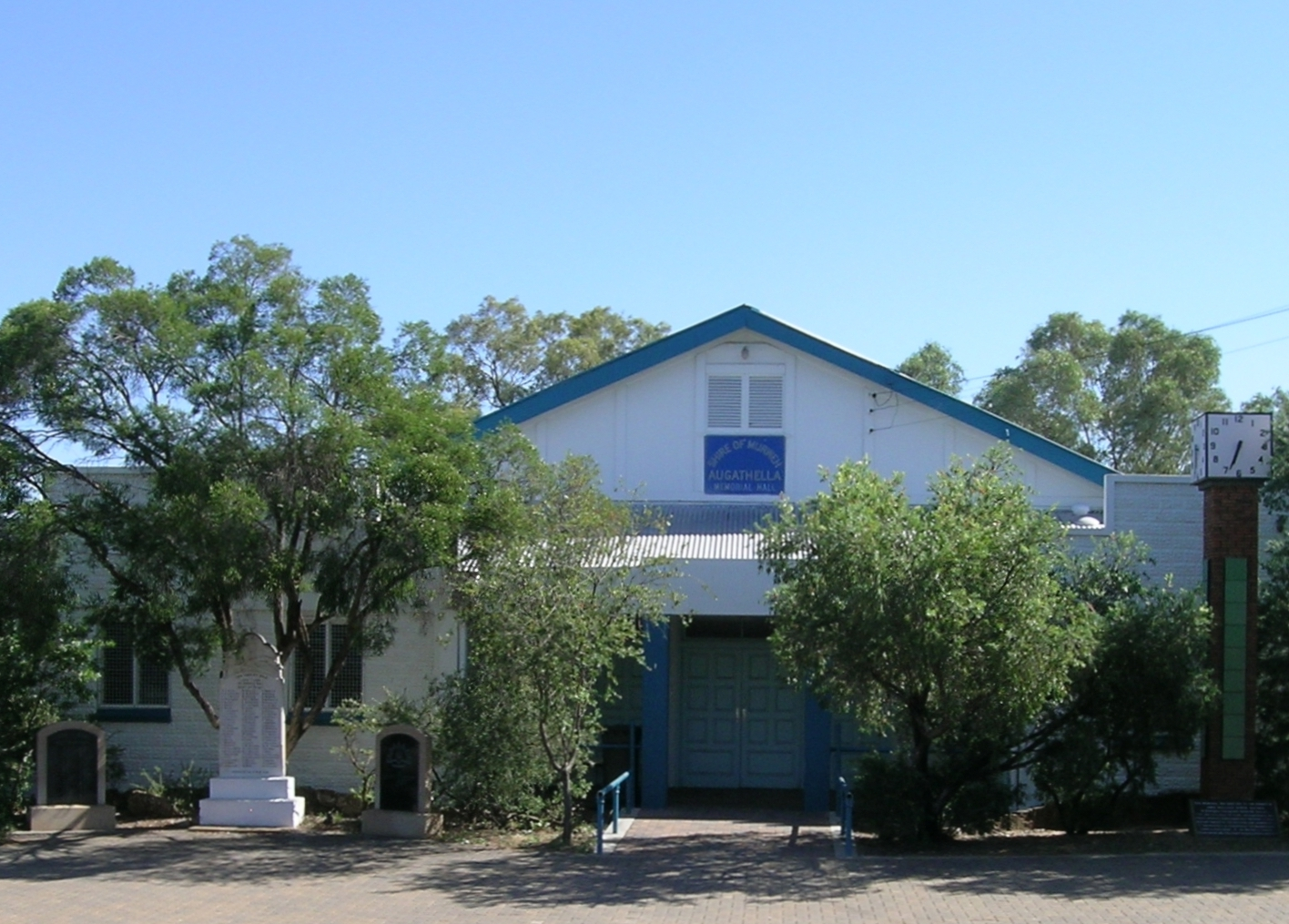
- Memorial Hall, Augathella

- Interactive map of Augathella
- Coordinates: 25.7947°S 146.5858°E
- Country: Australia
- State: Queensland
- LGA: Shire of Murweh
- Location: 83.9 km (52.1 mi) NE of Charleville; 269 km (167 mi) WNW of Roma; 620 km (390 mi) WNW of Toowoomba; 749 km (465 mi) WNW of Brisbane

Government
  - State electorate: Warrego
  - Federal division: Maranoa

Area
  - Total: 1,459.1 km^{2} (563.4 sq mi)

Population
  - Total: 328 (2021 census)
  - Density: 0.2248/km^{2} (0.5822/sq mi)
- Time zone: UTC+10:00 (AEST)
- Postcode: 4477
Localities around Augathella
Ward	Nive	Caroline Crossing
Ward	Augathella	Caroline Crossing
Ward	Gowrie Station	Clara Creek

Augathella /ˈɔːɡəθɛlə/ is a rural town and locality in the Shire of Murweh, Queensland, Australia. In the 2021 census, the locality of Augathella had a population of 328 people.

== Geography ==
Augathella lies on the Matilda Highway, is 85 kilometres (53 mi) north of the town of Charleville, 271 kilometres (168 mi) west of Roma and 748 kilometres (465 mi) west of Brisbane (Queensland's capital). The town lies on the banks of the Warrego River.

Grazing is still the predominant industry of the area.

== History ==
=== Aboriginal people ===
Bidjara (also known as Bidyara, Pitjara, and Peechara) is an Australian Aboriginal language spoken by the Bidjara people. The Bidjara language region includes the local government areas of the Shire of Murweh, particularly the towns of Charleville, Augathella and Blackall as well as the properties of Nive Downs and Mount Tabor.

Gungabula (also known as Kongabula and Khungabula) is an Australian Aboriginal language of the headwaters of the Dawson River in Central Queensland. The language region includes areas within the local government area of Maranoa Region, particularly the towns of Charleville, Augathella and Blackall and as well as the Carnarvon Range.

Gunya (Kunya, Kunja, Kurnja) is an Australian Aboriginal language spoken by the Gunya people. The Gunya language region includes the landscape within the local government boundaries of the Paroo Shire Council, taking in Cunnamulla and extending north towards Augathella, east towards Bollon and west towards Thargomindah.

=== British colonisation ===
The first British explorer to enter the region was Edmund Kennedy, whose 1847 expedition encountered an Aboriginal community who communicated the words "Yo, Yo" to express affirmation. Kennedy subsequently called the creek where he found this community Yo Yo Creek.

Pastoralists started to take land in the region in early 1862 with the arrival of James Norman, who took up vast leaseholds on behalf of Joseph Fleming and Adeline Dollman. Norman established the Burenda, Yo Yo and Augathella properties.

Aboriginal resistance to colonisation in the region was notable in that several victories were achieved against the paramilitary units of the Native Police on the upper Warrego and Ward rivers. However, in 1864 a Native Police barracks was built on Yo Yo Creek, and punitive expeditions under officers such as Sub-Lieutenant Carr crushed any further resistance.

=== Augathella township ===
The town, built up gradually over what was Kunja tribal territory, came into being initially as a resting place for bullock teams lying at the convergence of three bullock tracks from Morven, Tambo, and Charleville. Originally called Burenda it was renamed Ellangowan (still the name of the local watering hole) and when gazetted in 1883 called Augathella. This is apparently an Indigenous Australian word meaning "camp on a waterhole", referring the Warrego River. A service centre sprang up to service their needs and the needs of the burgeoning grazing industry.

Burenda Post Office opened on 1 September 1869. It was renamed Ellangowan in 1877 and Augathella in 1883.

Augathella Provisional School opened on 1 January 1884. On 7 August 1893 it became Augathella State School.

On Sunday 10 July 1892 St Luke's Anglican church was officially opened by Bishop Nathaniel Dawes. A new church was built at a cost of £8300 and dedicated in 1957.

On 1 October 1928 Rev W.C. Radcliffe officially opened the Augathella Presbyterian Church.

The 1956 film Smiley was based on Moore Raymond's novel of the same name, which was set in a fictionalised version of Augathella.

The town's service centre was bypassed by the new Matilda Highway during the 1980s. Some new businesses have slowly encroached back onto the highway frontage.

Augathella and the surrounding district suffered extensive flood damage in April 1990 when the Warrego River burst its banks and flooded the town with more than 50 houses inundated.

The Augathella Library opened in 2000.

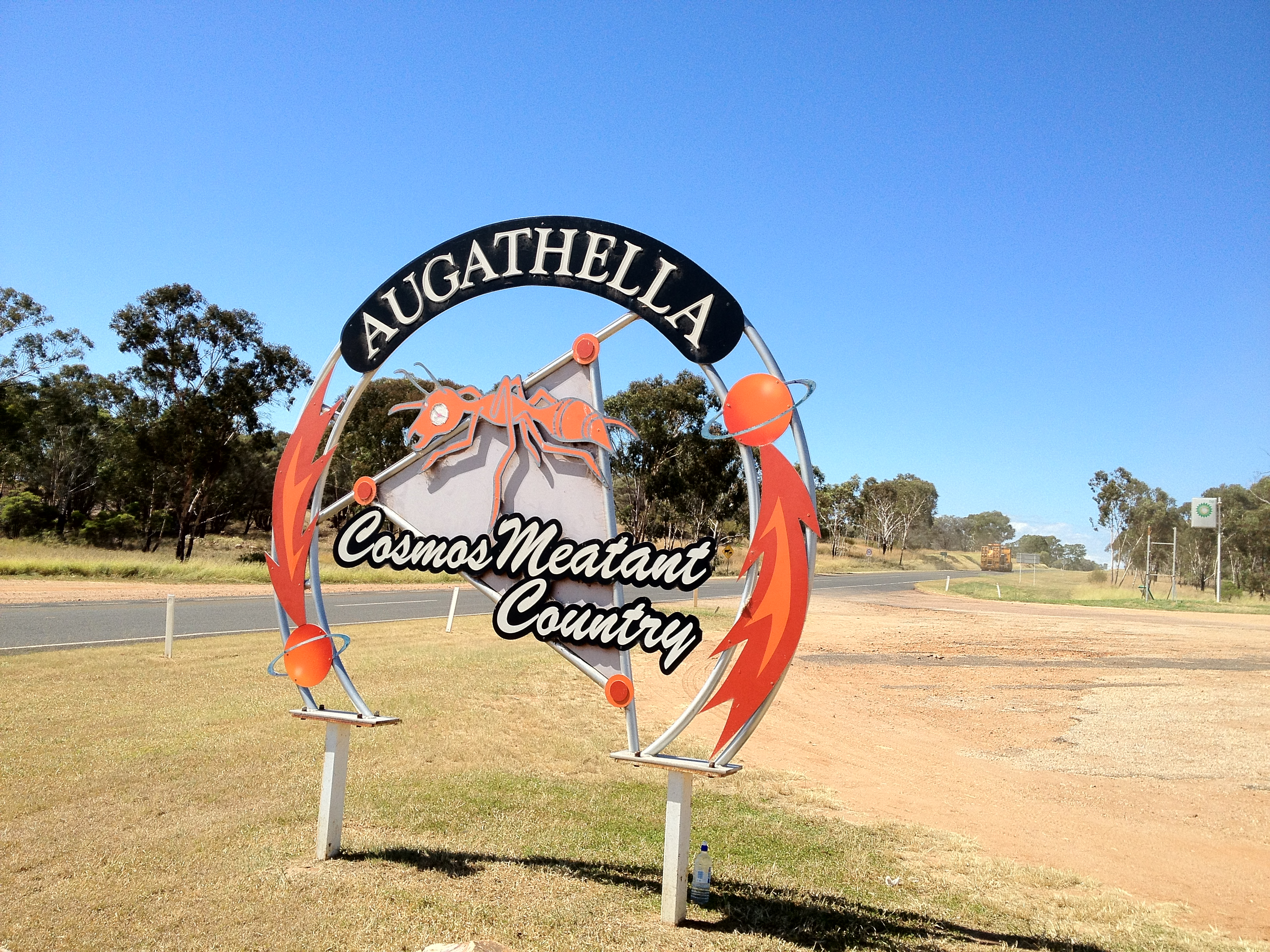
Augathella Cosmos Meatant Country

Since 2011 the main street of the town has been marked by 4.5m steel and copper giant sculpture of a meat ant – in a reference to its former junior football team, named the "Mighty Meat Ants".

== Demographics ==
In the 2006 census, the town of Augathella had a population of 395 people.

In the 2016 census, the locality of Augathella had a population of 449 people.

In the 2021 census, the locality of Augathella had a population of 328 people.

== Heritage listings ==
There are a number of heritage-listed sites in Augathella, including:

Within the town:

- Catholic School, Annie Street
- Hospital, Cavanagh Street
- Queensland Country Women's Association, Cavanagh Street
- Rodeo Grounds, Elmes Street
- Augathella Water Tower, Forest Street
- Kenniff Tree, Jane Street (corner of Cavanagh Street)
- Arts and Craft Centre (former Helton's Building), Main Street
- Butcher shop, Main Street
- Police station, Main Street
- Post office, Main Street
- Town hall, Main Street
- War Memorial Hill, Main Street
- Ellangowan Hotel, Main & Annie Streets
- St Luke's Anglican Church, 61 Main Street
- Old Water Tower, Nelson Street
- Cemetery, off Russell Street
- Augathella Race Course, off West Street

Within the locality:

- Fig Tree Spring Stockyards, Carnarvon Station
- Ralph's Bore & Upper Warrego Police Barracks site, Dooloogarah Carnarvon National Park Road
- Dingo Fence Section, Mount Tabor

== Education ==
Augathella State School is a government primary (Early Childhood to Year 6) school for boys and girls at Cavanagh Street (25.7971°S 146.5833°E). In 2018, the school had an enrolment of 44 students with 4 teachers and 4 non-teaching staff (3 full-time equivalent). Augathella State School is part of Education Queensland's Charleville Cluster and is supported by the Darling Downs South West regional team which is based in Toowoomba.

There are no secondary schools in Augathella. School Bus Route S279 conveys students from Year 7 to Year 12 into Charleville to attend Charleville State High School.

== Amenities ==
The Murweh Shire Council operates the Augathella Library on Main Street, Augathella.

The Augathella branch of the Queensland Country Women's Association has its rooms at 101 Cavanagh Street.

St Luke's Anglican Church is at 61 Main Street (25.7948°S 146.585477°E) and holds services on the 2nd Sunday of each month.

== Events ==
There is a Christmas Celebration in Meat Ant Park every December.

== Media ==
Augathella is serviced by:

- Radio 4VL (Resonate Radio) – 106.1 FM
- The Australian Broadcasting Corporation transmits ABC Television and its sister channels ABC Kids/ABC Family, ABC Entertains and ABC News to Augathella through its relay station, ABAAQ at 25°48′23″S 146°35′21″E (old Charleville–Augathella Road)
- The Seven Network and its sister stations 7two and 7mate transmit to Augathella through its regional area affiliate, ITQ
- The Nine Network and its sister channels 9Gem and 9Go! transmit to Augathella through its regional area affiliate, Imparja Television
- Network 10 and its sister channels 10 Drama and 10 Comedy transmit to Augathella through its regional area affiliate, CDT
- The Special Broadcasting Service and its sister channels SBS2, SBS World Movies and SBS Food also transmit to Augathella

== Attractions ==
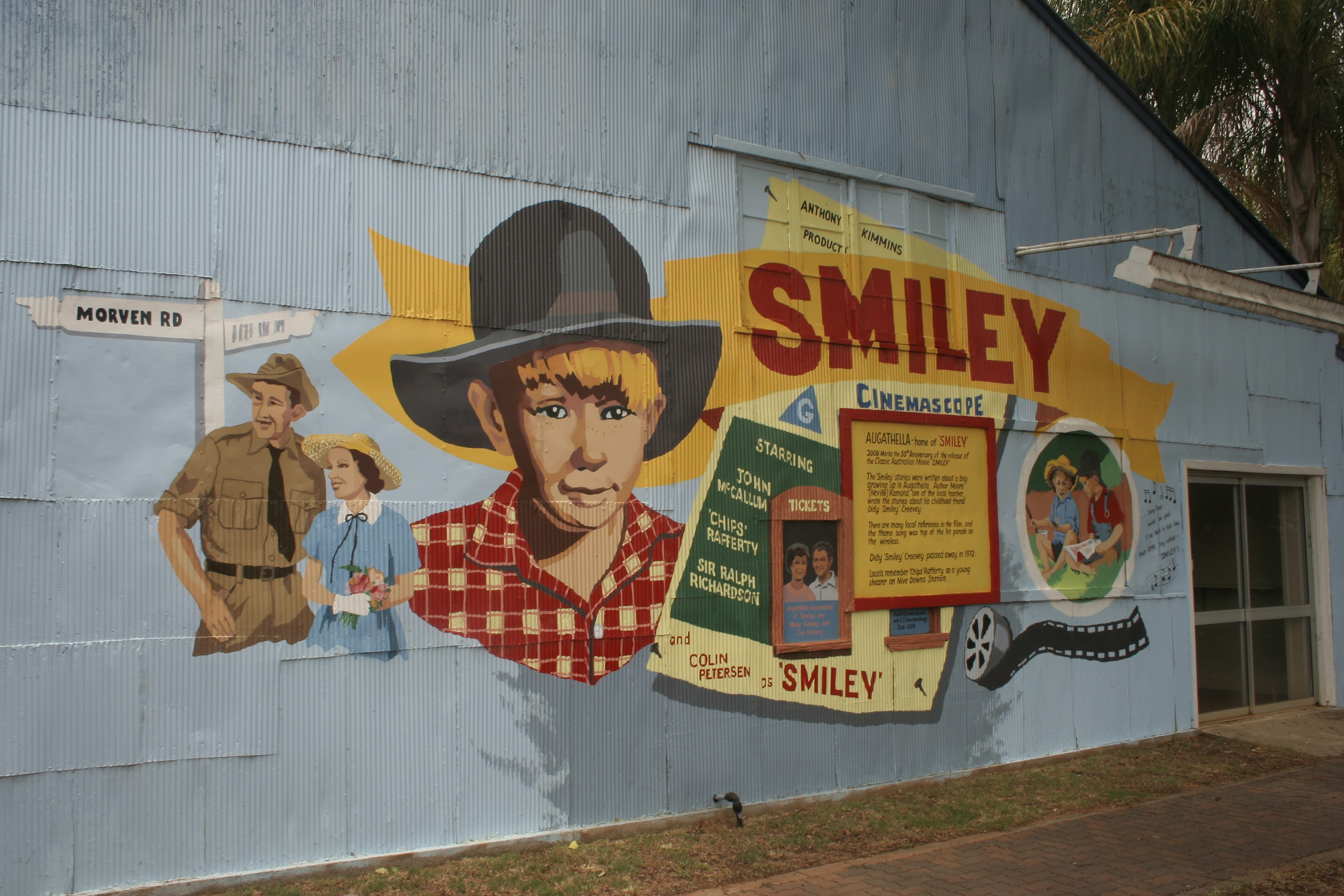
Smiley film mural

Augathella is the permanent home of the Q150 Shed that travelled around the state in 2009 as part of the Q150 Celebrations providing each community it visited a night of entertainment. Communities toured included: Mount Isa, Cairns, Townsville, Mackay, Rockhampton, Maryborough, Blackall, Augathella, Cherbourg, Warwick, Brisbane and the Gold Coast.

== Transport ==
Augathella is situated on the junction of the Landsborough Highway from Morven and the Mitchell Highway from Charleville. Augathella is served by Greyhound Australia who operates Gx493 between Brisbane and Mount Isa and its return service, Gx494 which stops at the BP Roadhouse on the Highway.

Augathella Aerodrome has a sealed runway, 1,000 by 25 metres (3,281 ft × 82 ft). It is operated by Murweh Shire Council.

== In popular culture ==
Augathella is the destination of cattle drovers in the Australian folk song Brisbane Ladies. This song is alternately called "Augathella Station".
