= Nive River (Queensland) =

Nive
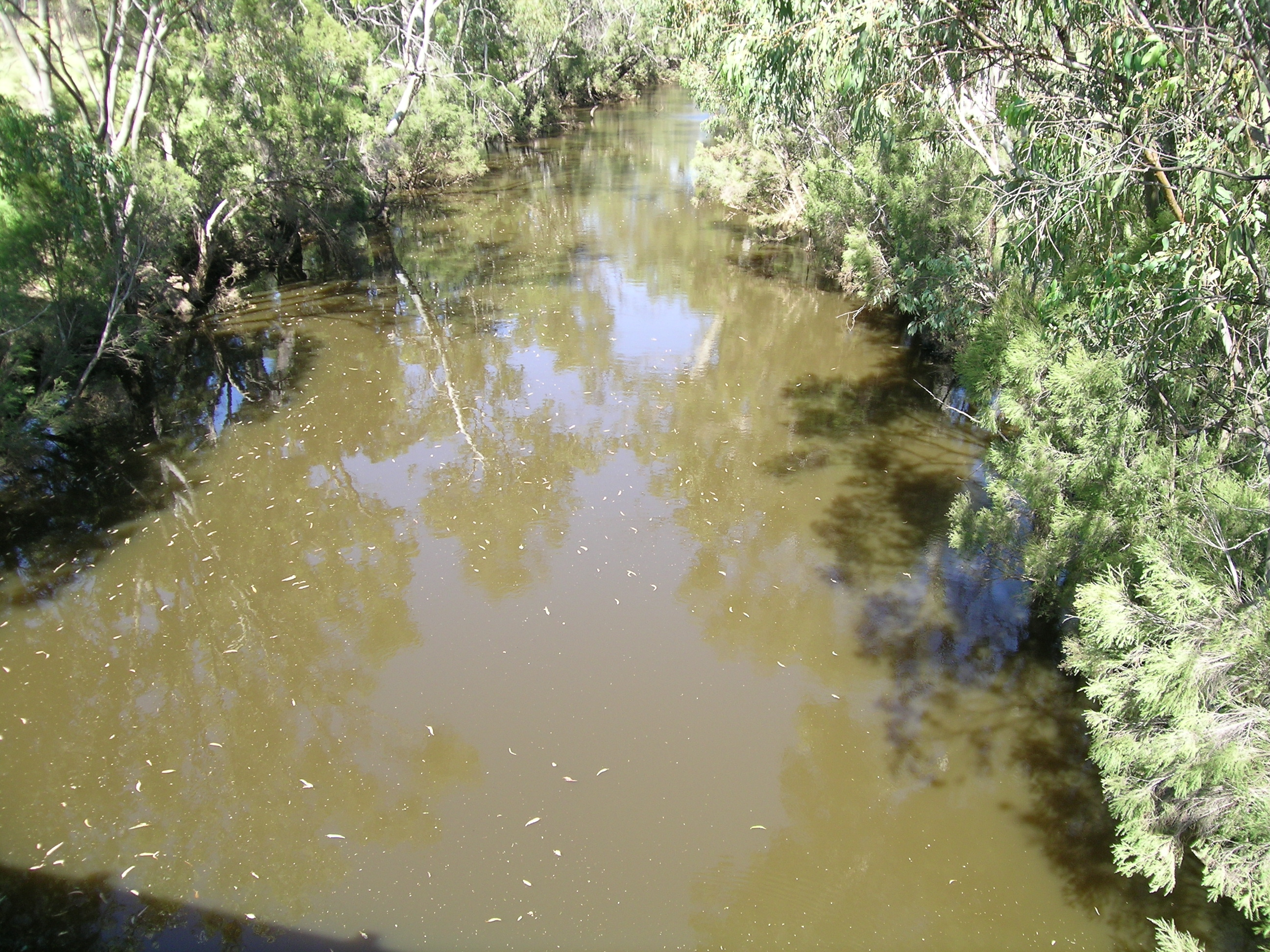
- The Nive River near Augathella

- Location of Nive River mouth in Queensland
- Etymology: River Nive

Location
- Country: Australia
- State: Queensland
- Region: South West Queensland

Physical characteristics
- Source: Mount Playfair
  - location: east of Tambo
  - coordinates: 24°56′18″S 146°51′07″E
  - elevation: 563 m (1,847 ft)
- Mouth: confluence with Warrego River
  - location: southwest of Augathella
  - coordinates: 26°01′08″S 146°25′09″E
  - elevation: 336 m (1,102 ft)
- Length: 263 km (163 mi)

Basin features
- River system: Darling River catchment Murray–Darling basin
- Tributaries
  - right: Nivelle River

The Nive River is a river that is part of the Darling catchment within the Murray–Darling basin, in the south west region of Queensland, Australia.

== Course and features ==
The Nive River rises on the western slopes of Mount Playfair south of the Salvador Rosa section of Carnarvon National Park and flows westwards through Long Waterhole to approximately 15 kilometres (9.3 mi) east of Tambo. There the Nive flows to the south, its course followed by the Landsborough Highway, before crossing it near Nive Downs. The river flows to the west of Augathella and has its confluence with the Warrego River south of Augathella. From source to mouth, the Nive is joined by twelve minor tributaries and descends 226 metres (741 ft) over its 263-kilometre (163 mi) course.

The towns of Charleville, Wyandra and Cunnamulla are located on the banks of the Warrego River. Cunnamulla is the only town with a levee bank to protect it against flooding. The Warrego River reaches the Darling River about 34 kilometres (21 mi) east of Louth.

== History ==
In 1845 Major Sir Thomas Mitchell was the first European to explore the Warrego River and he named its tributary, the Nive River, after the Nive, a river in south western France. When the Mitchell district was opened for settlement, the Bell and Dutton families were among the first applicants for land on the Nive River and their leases included the site of Tambo.

== See also ==
- List of rivers of Australia § Queensland
