= Ward River (Central West Queensland) =

River in Queensland, Australia

Ward
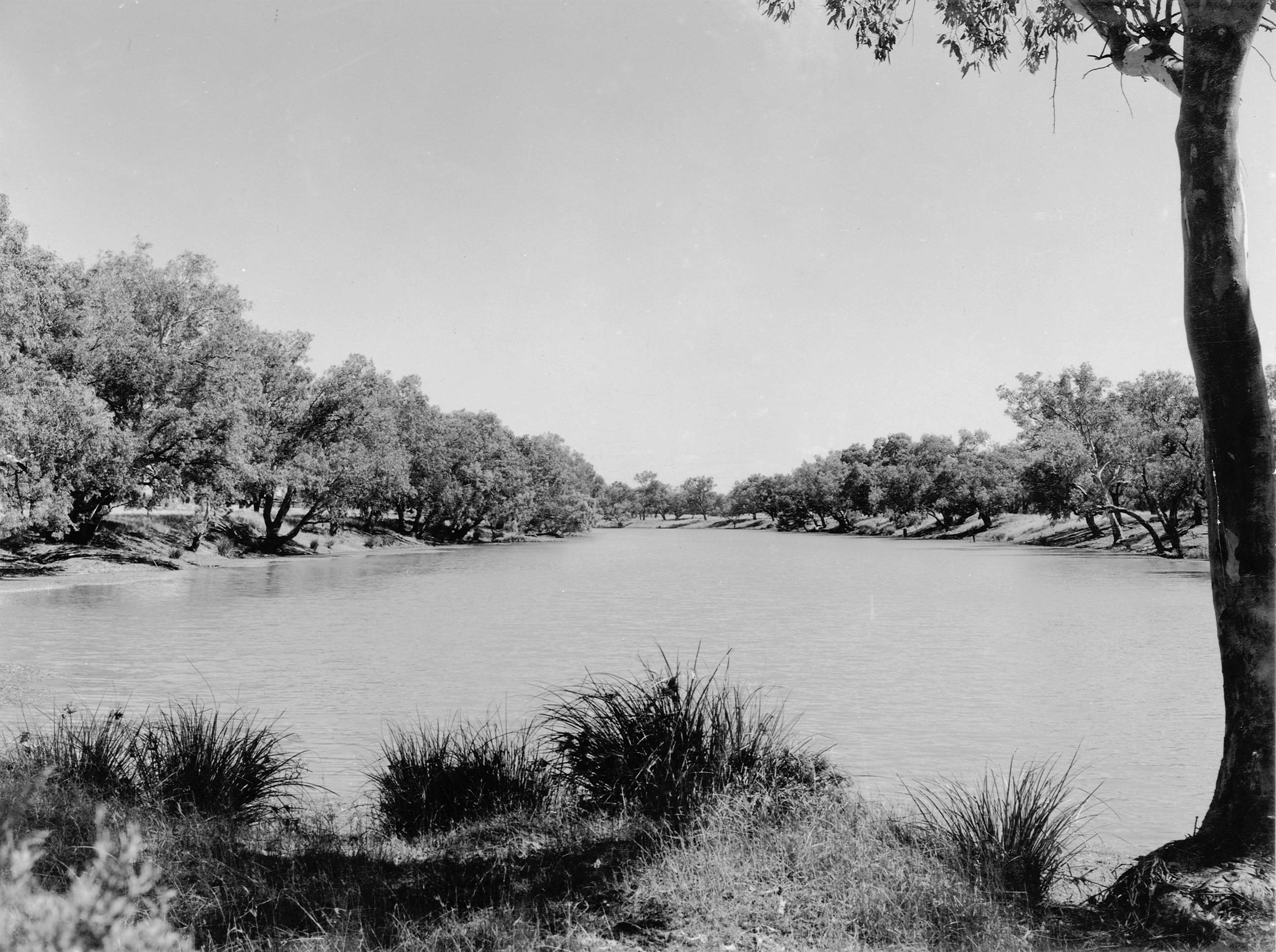
- Ward River waterhole, near Charleville, 1955.

- Location of Ward River mouth in Queensland

Location
- Country: Australia
- State: Queensland
- Region: Central West Queensland

Physical characteristics
- Source: Warrego Range
  - location: south of Tambo
  - coordinates: 25.1145°S 146.2223°E
  - elevation: 390 m (1,280 ft)
- Mouth: confluence with the Warrego River
  - location: south-west of Charleville
  - coordinates: 26.5525°S 146.10472°E
  - elevation: 273 m (896 ft)
- Basin size: 14,671 km^{2} (5,665 sq mi)

Basin features
- River system: Murray-Darling basin

The Ward River, part of the Murray-Darling basin, is a river in Central West Queensland, Australia.

The headwaters of the river rise in the Warrego Range, south of Tambo. Formed by the confluence of Larry Creek and Rams Gully in Lansdowne, the river flows generally south, mostly as braided channels, before reaching its confluence with the Warrego River south-west of Charleville that ultimately flows into the Darling River.

== See also ==
- List of rivers of Australia § Queensland
