= Warrego River =

River in Australia

Warrego
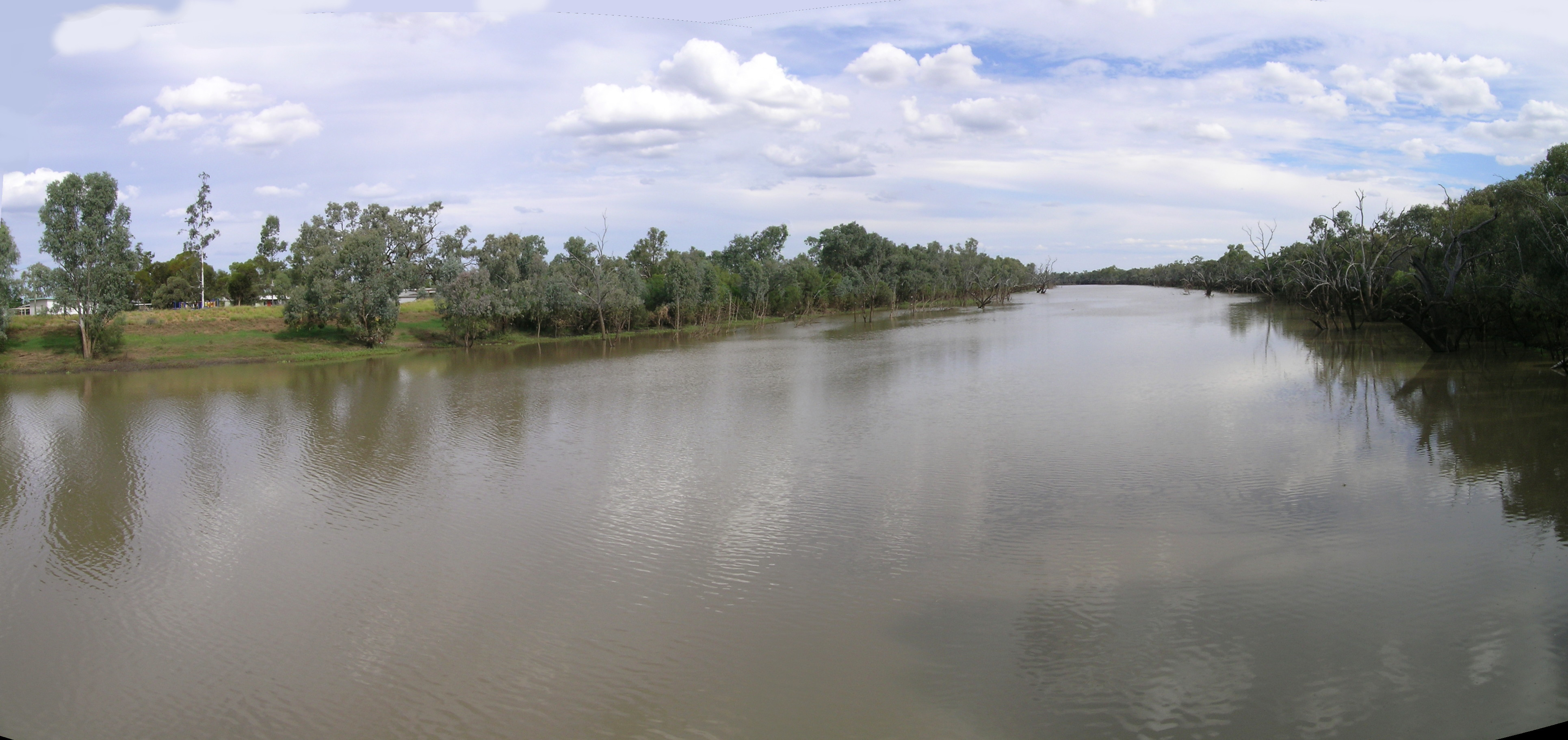
- The Warrego River at Cunnamulla

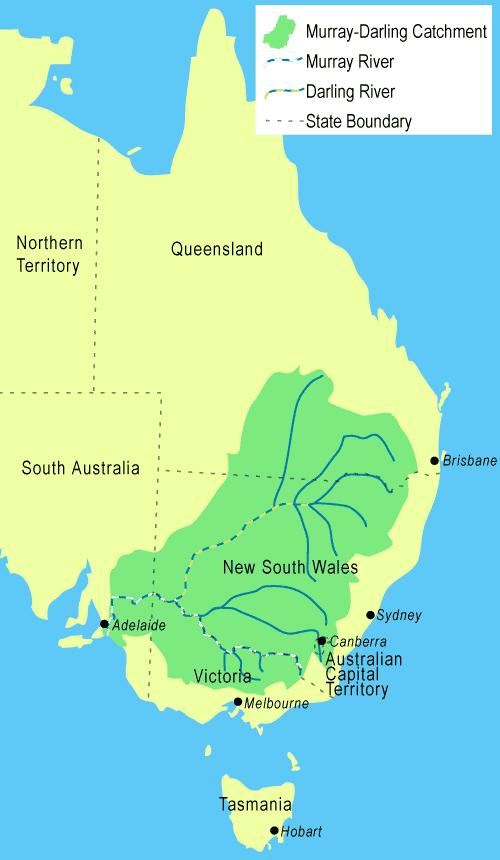
- The Warrego River is the northernmost river in the Murray–Darling basin
- Etymology: 1. Aboriginal Bidyara: bad; 2. Aboriginal: river of sand.

Location
- Country: Australia
- States: Queensland, New South Wales
- Region: South West Queensland, Orana
- Settlements: Augathella, Charleville, Wyandra, Cunnamulla

Physical characteristics
- Source: Mount Ka Ka Mundi, Carnarvon Range
  - location: east of Tambo, Queensland
  - coordinates: 25°03′22″S 147°28′49″E
  - elevation: 625 m (2,051 ft)
- Mouth: Darling River
  - location: near Bourke, New South Wales
  - coordinates: 30°24′13″S 145°20′54″E
  - elevation: 98 m (322 ft)
- Length: 1,380 km (860 mi)
- Basin size: 69,290 km^{2} (26,750 sq mi)
- Discharge
  - average: 8 m^{3}/s (280 cu ft/s)

Basin features
- River system: Darling River catchment, Murray–Darling basin
- Tributaries
  - right: Nive River, Langlo River
- Reservoirs: Dillalah Waterhole, Ten Mile Waterhole, Lower Lila Dam, Six Mile Dam, Turtle Waterhole, and Boera Dam

The Warrego River is an intermittent river that is part of the Darling catchment within the Murray–Darling basin, which is located in South West Queensland and in the Orana region of New South Wales, Australia. The Warrego River is the northernmost tributary of the Darling River.

== Course and features ==
The river rises from below Mount Ka Ka Mundi in the Carnarvon Range, near Tambo in Queensland, and flows generally south, reaching its confluence with the Darling River, downstream from Bourke. The river is joined by thirty-seven tributaries, including the Nive and Langlo rivers, descending 528 metres (1,732 ft) over its 1,380-kilometre (860 mi) course. The river flows through a series of reservoirs, including the Dillalah Waterhole, Ten Mile Waterhole, Lower Lila Dam, Six Mile Dam, Turtle Waterhole, and Boera Dam.

The towns of Augathella, Charleville, Wyandra and Cunnamulla are located on the banks of the river.

=== Inflows ===
Most of the basin of the Warrego is too dry for cropping and has a very erratic rainfall of between 350 and 500 millimetres (14 and 20 in). It is covered with a natural vegetation of grassland on more fertile clay soils, and saltbush shrubland on less fertile red earths. The predominant land use is low-intensity grazing of sheep and cattle: the river's flow is much too erratic to permit irrigated cropping. The Warrego is essentially an ephemeral stream: it is not unknown for years to pass without any flow in the basin and substantial amounts of water reach the Darling River only in wet years almost always associated with La Niña events.

=== Outflows ===
Below Wyandra the river forms a series of outflowing creeks and anabranches. During floods, the Widgeegoara, Kudnapper and Noorama Creeks allow water to channel into Nebine Creek, a tributary of the Culgoa River. Cuttaburra Creek connects the Warrego to the Paroo River via a distribution system that flows through channels, floodways and wetlands. The Irrara Creek anabranch flows into Kerribree Creek which continues into a number of wetlands before filling Utah Lake.

=== Flooding ===
When La Niña occurs, flooding is usual along the Warrego: major floods associated with La Niña events occurred in 1950, 1954 to 1956, 1971, 1973, 1998 and 2008. Oddly, the most destructive flood ever recorded on the river took place in the absence of La Niña. In April 1990, as a result of two extremely strong troughs in the easterlies, over 400 millimetres (16 in) of rain fell in Cunnamulla in two weeks, being more than the annual rainfall in over 60 percent of years. The river, along with most tributaries of the Darling, reached near-record levels and the towns of Augathella and Charleville were devastated. At Charleville a river height peak of 8.54 metres (28.0 ft) was recorded.

== Fauna ==
The Warrego River is one of a few rivers where silver perch breed naturally. Golden perch and Murray cod are also found in the river.

Carnarvon Station, once a large cattle property at the rivers headwaters, was acquired by the Australian Bush Heritage Fund in 2001, with the 590 square kilometres (230 sq mi) property set aside for the protection of threatened species of birds and animals.

== Etymology ==
The name Warrego is an Australian Aboriginal word from the Bidyara language, believed to mean "bad"; and is also an Aboriginal term meaning "river of sand".

Two warships of the Royal Australian Navy have been named HMAS Warrego after the river. The Warrego Highway draws its name from the river.

== Aboriginal cultural heritage ==
Bidjara (also known as Bidyara, Pitjara, Peechara) is an Australian Aboriginal language spoken by the Bidjara people. The Bidjara language region includes the landscape within the local government boundaries of the Murweh Shire Council, particularly the towns of Charleville, Augathella and Blackall as well as the properties of Nive Downs and Mount Tabor.

Gunya (also known as Kunya, Kunja, Kurnja) is an Australian Aboriginal language spoken by the Gunya people. The Gunya language region includes the landscape within the local government boundaries of the Paroo Shire Council, taking in Cunnamulla and extending north towards Augathella, east towards Bollon and west towards Thargomindah.

== See also ==
- Rivers of New South Wales
- List of rivers of Australia § Queensland
