= M3architecture =

Australian architecture firm

M3architecture (stylised m3architecture) is an Australian architecture firm based in Brisbane. The practice was founded in 1997 and is run by Directors Michael Banney, Ben Vielle, Michael Christensen and Michael Lavery.

The firm's work ranges from the $140m (AUD) University of Queensland Sustainable Futures Building to public, education and smaller arts projects such as the Tree of Knowledge Memorial in Barcaldine.

== Selected awards ==
- 2019 Australian Institute of Architects Queensland Architecture Awards: Commendation – Interior Architecture: Level 3, 143 Edward Street, Brisbane (QCEC Workplace Fitout)
- 2019 Minister's Award for Urban Design – Barcaldine Master Plan
- 2018 Australian Urban Design Award – Barcaldine Master Plan
- 2018 Good Design Award winner. Architectural Design Urban Design. The Globe (Including the Barcaldine regional master plan & The Tree of Knowledge)
- 2018 Australian Institute of Architects Queensland Architecture Awards: Commendation – Houses Alterations and Additions. Patrick Street Residence.
- 2018 Australian Institute of Architects Queensland Architecture Awards: Commendation – Small Projects. UQ Zelman Cowan Building new entry.
- 2017 Fly Forbo Award Overall Winner. University of Queensland Architecture School refurbishment.
- 2017 Australian Institute of Architects National Architecture Awards: National Award for Public Architecture – The Globe Hotel (in association with Brian Hooper Architect)
- 2017 Australian Institute of Architects National Architecture Awards: National Award for Educational Architecture – St Joseph's Nudgee College Hanly Learning Centre
- 2017 Australian Institute of Architects National Architecture Awards: National Award for Residential Architecture – Houses (New) – Cape Tribulation House
- 2017 Australian Institute of Architects National Architecture Awards: National Commendation for Public Architecture – Act for Kids Child and Family Centre for Excellence
- 2017 Australian Institute of Architects National Architecture Awards: National Commendation for Sustainable Architecture – Mount Alvernia College Anthony and La Verna Buildings
- 2017 Australian Institute of Architects (Queensland Chapter) Architecture Awards – State Award – Jennifer Taylor Award for Educational Architecture: Mount Alvernia College Anthony and La Verna Buildings
- 2017 Australian Institute of Architects (Queensland Chapter) Architecture Awards – State Award for Educational Architecture: St Joseph's Nudgee College Hanly Learning Centre
- 2017 Australian Institute of Architects (Queensland Chapter) Architecture Awards – State Award for Educational Architecture: Brisbane Girls Grammar School Research Learning Centre
- 2017 Australian Institute of Architects (Queensland Chapter) Architecture Awards – State Award – Harry Marks Award for Sustainable Architecture: Mount Alvernia College Anthony and La Verna Buildings
- 2017 Australian Institute of Architects (Queensland Chapter) Architecture Awards – State Award for Sustainable Architecture: St Joseph's Nudgee College Bathersby Boarding Village
- 2017 Australian Institute of Architects (Queensland Chapter) Architecture Awards – Robin Dods Award for Residential Architecture – Houses (New): Cape Tribulation House
- 2017 Australian Institute of Architects (Queensland Chapter) Architecture Awards – Job and Froud Award for Residential Architecture – Houses (Multiple Housing): St Joseph's Nudgee College Bathersby Boarding Village
- 2017 Australian Institute of Architects (Queensland Chapter) Architecture Awards – State Award for Heritage Architecture: The Globe Hotel (in association with Brian Hooper Architect)
- 2017 Australian Institute of Architects (Queensland Chapter) Architecture Awards – State Award for Public Architecture: Act for Kids Child and Family Centre for Excellence
- 2017 Australian Institute of Architects (Queensland Chapter) Architecture Awards – State Award for Public Architecture: The Globe Hotel (in association with Brian Hooper Architect)
- 2017 Australian Institute of Architects (Queensland Chapter) Architecture Awards – State Commendation for Interior Architecture: University of Queensland Chemistry Building, Levels 3 and 4
- 2017 Australian Institute of Architects (Queensland Chapter) Architecture Awards – State Commendation for Interior Architecture: Brisbane Girls Grammar School Research Learning Centre
- 2017 Australian Institute of Architects (New South Wales Chapter) Architecture Awards – State Commendation for Small Project Architecture: Newcastle Music Studio
- 2015 Think Brick Awards (National) Grand Prix Winner: ACT for Kids Child and Family Centre for Excellence
- 2014 Australian Institute of Architects (Queensland Chapter) Architecture Awards: State Commendation – Interior Architecture: UQ Chemistry Level 8
- 2013 Australian Institute of Architects (Queensland Chapter) Regional Architecture Awards: State Commendation – Sustainable Architecture: 11 Saint James Street Petrie Terrace
- 2012 Australian Institute of Architects (Queensland Chapter) Architecture Awards: State Award – Interior Architecture: Mansergh Shaw Level 5, The University of Queensland
- 2012 Australian Institute of Architects (Queensland Chapter) Architecture Awards: State Commendation – Public Architecture: David Theile Olympic Swimming Pool, The University of Queensland
- 2011 Australian Institute of Architects National Architecture Awards: National Award for Interior Architecture: St Joseph's Nudgee College, Tierney Auditorium
- 2011 Australian Institute of Architects(Queensland Chapter) Architecture Awards: State Award – G.H.M. Addison Award for Interior Architecture: St Joseph's Nudgee College, Tierney Auditorium
- 2011 Australian Institute of Architects (Queensland Chapter) Architecture Awards: State Award – Karl Langer Award for Urban Architecture: Yeerongpilly Bridge
- 2011 Australian Institute of Architects (Queensland Chapter) Architecture Awards: Regional Commendation – Interior Architecture: St Joseph's Nudgee College, Tierney Auditorium
- 2011 Australian Institute of Architects (Queensland Chapter) Architecture Awards: Regional Commendation – Urban Architecture: Yeerongpilly Bridge
- 2010 Australian Institute of Architects National Architecture Awards: The Lachlan Macquarie Award for Heritage Architecture: Barcaldine Tree of Knowledge Memorial
- 2010 Australian Institute of Architects National Architecture Awards: National Commendation – Public Architecture: Barcaldine Tree of Knowledge Memorial
- 2010 Australian Institute of Architects (Queensland Chapter) Architecture Awards: State Award – Public Architecture: Barcaldine Tree of Knowledge Memorial
- 2010 Australian Institute of Architects (Queensland Chapter) Architecture Awards: Regional Award – JW Wilson Building of the Year: Barcaldine Tree of Knowledge Memorial
- 2010 Australian Institute of Architects (Queensland Chapter) Architecture Awards: Regional Commendation – Public Architecture: Barcaldine Tree of Knowledge Memorial
- 2009 Australian Timber Design Awards: National Award – Overall Winner: Barcaldine Tree of Knowledge Memorial
- 2009 Australian Timber Design Awards: National Award – Public or Commercial Buildings: Barcaldine Tree of Knowledge Memorial
- 2009 Australian Timber Design Awards: National Award – Best Use of Certified Timber: Barcaldine Tree of Knowledge Memorial
- 2009 Australian Timber Design Awards: Queensland Award – Best Northern Region: Barcaldine Tree of Knowledge Memorial
- 2009 Australian Institute of Architects (Queensland Chapter) Architecture Awards: State Commendation – Interior Architecture: UQ Science Learning Centre
- 2009 Australian Institute of Architects (Queensland Chapter) Architecture Awards: Regional Commendation – Interior Architecture: Brisbane North Eye Centre, Chermside
- 2009 Australian Institute of Architects (Queensland Chapter) Architecture Awards: Regional Commendation – Interior Architecture: UQ Science Learning Centre
- 2008 Australian Institute of Architects National Architecture Awards: Sir Zelman Cowen Award for Public Architecture, Cherrell Hirst Creative Learning Centre, Brisbane Girls Grammar School
- 2008 Australian Institute of Architects (Queensland Chapter) Architecture Awards: FDG Stanley Award for Public Architecture: Cherrell Hirst Creative Learning Centre, Brisbane Girls Grammar School
- 2008 Australian Institute of Architects (Queensland Chapter) Architecture Awards: State Commendation – Interior Architecture: Cherrell Hirst Creative Learning Centre, Brisbane Girls Grammar School
- 2008 Australian Institute of Architects (Queensland Chapter) Architecture Awards: Regional Commendation – Interior Architecture: UQ Chemistry Laboratory Fitouts Levels 9 and 10
- 2008 Architecture Australia Prize for unbuilt work – special mention: Captain Cook Landing Memorial – Memorial as Event
- 2007 Australian Institute of Architects National Architecture Awards: National Award – Small Project Architecture Award: QUT Human Movement Pavilion
- 2007 Australian Institute of Architects (Queensland Chapter) Architecture Awards: State Award – Hayes & Scott Award for Small Project Architecture: QUT Human Movement Pavilion
- 2007 Australian Institute of Architects (Queensland Chapter) Architecture Awards: State Award – Art and Architecture Prize: QUT Human Movement Pavilion
- 2007 Australian Institute of Architects (Queensland Chapter) Architecture Awards: Brisbane Regional Commendation: QUT Human Movement Pavilion
- 2006 Australian Institute of Architects (Queensland Chapter) Architecture Awards: G.H.M Addison Award for Interior Architecture: UQ Chemistry Building Fitout Levels 5, 6 West, 7 and 10 West
- 2006 Australian Institute of Architects (Queensland Chapter) Architecture Awards: Brisbane Regional Commendation: UQ Chemistry Building Fitout Levels 5, 6 West, 7 and 10 West
- 2005 Australian Institute of Architects President's Award for outstanding commitment to the support and mentoring of architectural graduates
- 2005 Design Institute of Australia Queensland Design Awards: Award of Merit – Best Use of Colour: UQ Centre for Marine Studies
- 2004 Design Institute of Australia Queensland Design Awards: Design Innovation and Excellence Award: Australian Institute of Architects Stage Set Design
- 2004 Design Institute of Australia Queensland Design Awards: Design Innovation and Excellence Award: UQ Micro Health Laboratory
- 2004 Design Institute of Australia Queensland Design Awards: Award of Merit – Set / Display Design: Australian Institute of Architects Stage Set Design 2002
- 2004 Design Institute of Australia Queensland Design Awards: Award of Merit – Public Art Collaboration: UQ Micro Health Laboratory
- 2003 Australian Institute of Architects (Queensland Chapter) Architecture Awards: State Commendation – Art & Architecture Award: Australian Institute of Architects Stage Set Design 2002
- 2002 Australian Institute of Architects (Queensland Chapter) Architecture Awards – State Award – Art and Architecture Award: UQ Micro Health Laboratory
- 2002 Australian Institute of Architects (Queensland Chapter) Architecture Awards: State Award – Public Building, Institutional Building Award: UQ Micro Health Laboratory

== Notable publications ==
- The David Theile Olympic Swimming Pool in, "The Pool"
- The David Theile Olympic Swimming Pool, The Yeerongpilly (Rod Laver) Footbridge, and The Tree of Knowledge in, "Practical Poetics in Architecture"
- ACT for Kids, Centre for Excellence and the UQ Microhealth Laboratory in, "Materiality – Brick and Block in Contemporary Australian Architecture"
- M3architecture: sites of transformation, in ArchitectureAU
- Outback pub to represent Australia at international architecture exhibition in Italy
- UQ Microhealth Laboratory in, "Brick"
- m3architecture featured in, "A Critical History of Contemporary Architecture: 1960–2010"
- m3architecture featured in, "The Encyclopedia of Australian Architecture"
- m3architecture featured in, "A Place in the Sun"
- m3architecture featured in, "10x10_3"
- The QUT Human Movement Pavilion in, "The Phaidon Atlas of 21st Century World Architecture"
- m3architecture featured in, "Next Wave: Emerging Talents in Australian Architecture"
- Taringa Residence in, "House Plus: Imaginative Ideas for Extending Your Home"
- The practice of m3architecture Masters by Research Thesis
- Anecdotal evidence – Michael Lavery's Doctor of Philosophy (PhD), Architecture and Urban Design, RMIT University
- Engaging objects – Michael Banney's Doctor of Philosophy (PhD), Architecture and Urban Design, RMIT University
- Architectural Guide Australia

== Exhibitions ==
- 2018 Venice Architecture Biennale, Australian Pavilion. Project: he Barcaldine masterplan (including; The Globe and The Tree of Knowledge) in, “Repair.”
- 2016 Venice Architecture Biennale, Australian Pavilion. Project: The David Theile Olympic Swimming Pool.
- 2014 Venice Architecture Biennale, Australian Pavilion. Project: Lodge on the Lake.
- 2010 Shanghai World Expo. Projects: Brisbane Girls Grammar School Cherrell Hirst Creative Learning Centre; Barcaldine Tree of Knowledge Memorial: ‘HEAT: Queensland Architects’, Stand at the 2010 World Expo, Shanghai. 20–26 June 2010.
- 2008 Venice Architecture Biennale, Australian Pavilion, ‘Abundant Australia’
- 2008 Optimism, Gallery of Modern Art
- 2008 Place Makers: Contemporary Queensland Architects Gallery of Modern Art, Brisbane. 2 August to 23 November 2008. Projects: Brisbane Girls Grammar School, UQ Microhealth Laboratory, Taringa Residence
- 2010 ‘All Politics is Local’, in Interior Design Magazine. Welsh, S. 2010. ‘All Politics is Local’. Interior Design. February 2010: 97
- 2007 ‘OUT FROM UNDER: Australian Architecture Now,’ held at Australian Institute of Architects, San Francisco. 8 March to 27 April 2007. UQ Microhealth Laboratory and Taringa Residence.
- 2006 Venice Architecture Biennale, Australian Pavilion. Projects: UQ Microhealth Laboratory in the Australian Pavilion at the 10th International Architecture Exhibition, ‘Cities, Architecture and Society,’ held in Venice, 10 September to 19 November 2006.
- 2006 ‘[v3]’ held at QPAC Forecourt, Southbank, Brisbane. 27 October 2006. Brisbane North Eye Centre.
- 2006 ‘Art Movement’ Exhibition, held at University of Technology Sydney Gallery, Sydney. 27 June to 28 July 2006. Curated by Ricardo Felipe. Brisbane Girls Grammar School Creative Learning Centre.
- 2006 The Design Institute of Australia Awards & Exhibition, held at Queensland Art Gallery, Brisbane. 3 to 18 June 2004. UQ Chemistry Interiors, St Lucia Campus.
- 2005 The Design Institute of Australia Awards & Exhibition, held at Queensland Art Gallery, Brisbane. 4 to 19 June 2005 Centre for Marine Studies, University of Queensland St Lucia.
- 2005 Australian Institute of Architects ‘Marvels’ Exhibition of built and unbuilt work, held at William St, Brisbane. 28 October to 2 November 2005. Projects: Brisbane Girls Grammar School Creative Learning Centre, Australian National University Bike Shelters, and, Yeppoon Apartments (with Brian Hooper Architect).
- 2004 The Design Institute of Australia Awards & Exhibition, held at Queensland Art Gallery, Brisbane. 5 to 14 June 2004. Projects: UQ Microhealth Laboratory Gatton Campus, and, Australian Institute of Architects Stage Set Design 2002.
- 2004 ART + ARCH Infinite Exhibition, held in various sites across Brisbane, 9 September to 3 October 2004. 'Work in Collaboration’ (Michael Banney and Dirk Yates) shown at City Hall.
- 2003 Australian Institute of Architects Tropical Housing Exhibition. Venue, 111 George St, Brisbane. 2003. Bennett Residence, Bribie Island.
