= Sir Zelman Cowen Award for Public Architecture =

Highest architecture award for public buildings in Australia

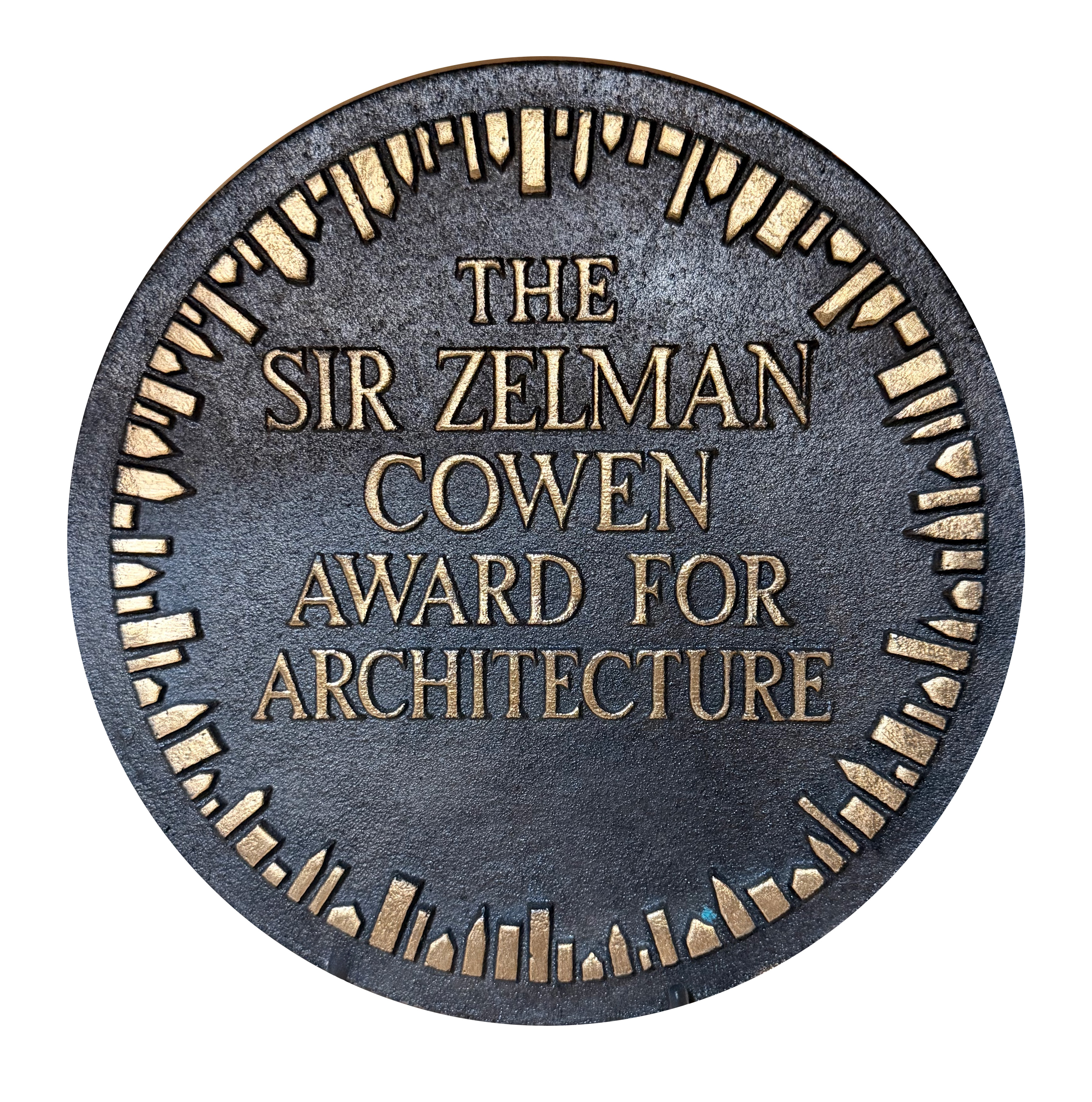
- Award Medal
- Awarded for: Public Architecture in Australia (Highest National Award)
- Country: Australia
- Presented by: Australian Institute of Architects
- First award: 1981; 45 years ago
- Currently held by: Ashley Halliday Architects together with the Yitpi Yartapuultiku Aboriginal Working Group and Wax Design for Yitpi Yartapuultiku, Port Adelaide 2026
- Website: www.architecture.com.au/awards

The Sir Zelman Cowen Award for Public Architecture is a national architecture award presented annually by the Australian Institute of Architects (AIA) since 1981. The named award is given to the work adjudicated to be the most significant for the advancement of public architecture in that year. Alongside the Named Award, National Awards and National Commendations are also given by the jury.

== Background ==
=== Definition of the award ===
The award recognises 'completed works of architecture of the highest quality' in the public architecture category. Originally the award was offered for 'non–residential buildings' with winning and commended projects including a wide array of building types including; cultural, education, health, transport, sports facilities, tourism, infrastructure, religion, justice, correctional facilities, war memorials, public administration, commercial buildings and a fountain.

Projects in this awards category must be predominantly of a public or institutional nature and generally fall within Building Code of Australia (BCA) Class 9, excluding projects within the definition of 'Educational Architecture or any BCA Class 9b building used primarily for educational purposes'. Projects awarded Named Awards and Architecture Awards by state-based Chapters of the AIA will be considered for a National Award in the same year. Since 2015 education projects have been assessed in a separate award category for the Daryl Jackson Award for Educational Architecture.

=== Zelman Cowen ===
The named award recognises Sir Zelman Cowen, a 1953 Fulbright Senior Scholar in Law from the University of Melbourne and Harvard University, a prominent legal scholar and university administrator, and later the 19th Governor General of Australia (1977—1982) at the time of the inception of the new national RAIA awards established in 1981.

== Named award winners ==
Sir Zelman Cowen Award for Public Architecture (reverse order)
Year	Architect	Project	Location	State	Type	Other AIA awards
2026	Ashley Halliday Architects together with the Yitpi Yartapuultiku Aboriginal Working Group and Wax Design	Yitpi Yartapuultiku (The Soul of Port Adelaide)	1300 Old Port Road, Port Adelaide	South Australia	Cultural	SA Architecture Medal, 2026; David Oppenheim Award for Sustainable Architecture, 2026; Jack McConnell Award for Public Architecture, 2026 (SA); Derrick Kendrick Award for Sustainable Architecture, 2026 (SA); Colorbond Award for Steel Architecture, 2026 (SA)
2025	BVN Architecture	Yarrila Place	27 Gordon Street, Coffs Harbour	New South Wales	Cultural	Sir John Sulman Medal, 2025
2024	Lahznimmo Architects	Powerhouse Castle Hill	2 Green Road, Castle Hill	New South Wales	Cultural	Public Architecture Award (NSW), 2024
2023	Conrad Gargett, Clare Design (Lead Design Architects) and Brian Hooper Architect	Rockhampton Museum of Art (RMOA)	220 Quay Street, Rockhampton	Queensland	Cultural	FDG Stanley Award for Public Architecture (Queensland), 2023; JW Wilson Award for Building of the Year, 2023 (Central Queensland Regional Award); Regional Commendation for Public Architecture, 2023 (Central Queensland Regional Award)
2022	Kerstin Thompson Architects	Bundanon Art Museum and Bridge	Bundanon, 533 Bundanon Road, Illaroo	New South Wales	Cultural	Sir John Sulman Medal, 2022 (NSW); National Award for Sustainable Architecture, 2022; Architecture Award for Sustainable Architecture, 2022 (NSW)
2021	Grimshaw in collaboration with Monash University	Woodside Building for Technology and Design	20 Exhibition Walk, Monash University Clayton Campus	Victoria	Education	David Oppenheim Award for Sustainable Architecture, 2021 (National); Victorian Architecture Medal, 2021; Melbourne Prize, 2021; Award for Educational Architecture, 2021 (Vic); Award for Sustainable Architecture, 2021 (Vic); Colorbond Award for Steel Architecture, 2021 (Vic)
2020	Johnson Pilton Walker with NSW Government Architect (*Joint Winner)	Anzac Memorial Centenary Extension	Hyde Park South, Sydney	New South Wales	War Memorial	Sir John Sulman Medal, 2020 (NSW); Architecture Award for Urban Design, 2020 (NSW)
2020	BVN Architecture (*Joint Winner)	Marrickville Library'	313 Marrickville Road, Marrickville	New South Wales	Cultural	David Oppenheim Award for Sustainable Architecture (NSW); NSW Premier's Prize, 2020; Milo Dunphy Award for Sustainable Architecture, 2020 (NSW); Architecture Award for Public Architecture, 2020 (NSW)
2019	Studio Hollenstein with Stewart Architecture	Green Square Library and Plaza	Green Square, Sydney	New South Wales	Cultural	Architecture Award for Public Architecture, 2019 (NSW); Architecture Award for Urban Design, 2019 (NSW); Premier's Prize, 2019 (NSW)
2018	Silver Thomas Hanley with Bates Smart	Bendigo Hospital	100 Barnard Street, Bendigo	Victoria	Health	Award for Public Architecture, 2018 (Vic)
2017	Officer Woods Architects	East Pilbara Arts Centre	Newman Drive, Newman	Western Australia	Cultural	Jeffrey Howlett Award for Public Architecture, 2017 (WA); Commendation for Sustainable Architecture, 2017 (WA); Commendation for Steel Architecture, 2017 (WA)
2016	ARM Architecture	Geelong Library and Heritage Centre	51 Little Malop Street, Geelong	Victoria	Cultural	William Wardell Award for Public Architecture, 2016; Marion Mahony Award for Interior Architecture, 2016; Victoria Regional Prize, 2016
2015	ARM Architecture	Shrine of Remembrance Galleries of Remembrance	St Kilda Road, Melbourne	Victoria	War Memorial	Victorian Architecture Medal, 2015; Melbourne Prize, 2015; William Wardell Award for Public Architecture, 2015; John George Knight Award (Heritage Architecture), 2015; Urban Design Architecture Award, 2015
2014	Richard Kirk Architect and Hassell Joint Venture	University of Queensland Advanced Engineering Building	Staff House Road, St Lucia	Queensland	Education	Emil Sodersten Award for Interior Architecture, 2014; National Award for Sustainable Architecture, 2014; FDG Stanley Award for Public Architecture, 2014 (Qld); GHM Addison Award for Interior Architecture, 2014 (Qld); Harry Marks Award for Sustainable Architecture, 2014 (Qld); John Dalton Award Building of the Year, 2014 (Qld Regional); Regional Commendation Public Architecture, 2014 (Qld); Regional Commendation Interior Architecture, 2014 (Qld)
2013	ARM Architecture & Cameron Chisholm Nicol Joint Venture Architects	Perth Arena	700 Wellington Street, Perth	Western Australia	Cultural	Emil Sodersten Award for Interior Architecture, 2013 (National); Jeffrey Howlett Award for Public Architecture, 2013 (WA); Colorbond Steel Award, 2013 (WA); Interior Architecture Award, 2013 (WA); George Temple Poole Award, 2013(WA)
2012	Fender Katsalidis	Museum of Old & New Art	Hobart	Tasmania	Cultural	Alan C Walker Award for Public Architecture, 2012 (Tas)
2011	Johnson Pilton Walker	Australian War Memorial Eastern Precinct	Australian War Memorial, Canberra	Australian Capital Territory	War Memorial	Canberra Medallion, 2011 (ACT); Romaldo Giurgola Award for Public Architecture, 2011 (ACT)
2010	Hassell	Epping to Chatswood rail link, Intermediate Stations	North Ryde and Macquarie Park	New South Wales	Transport	Sir John Sulman Medal, 2010
2009	Johnson Pilton Walker	National Portrait Gallery	King Edward Terrace, Parkes, Canberra	Australian Capital Territory	Cultural	National Architecture Award for Interior Architecture, 2009; Canberra Medallion, 2009 (ACT); Romaldo Giurgola Award for Public Architecture, 2009 (ACT); Light in Architecture Prize, 2009 (ACT)
2008	m3architecture	Cherrell Hirst Creative Learning Centre	Brisbane Girls Grammar School, Spring Hill	Queensland	Education	
2007	Donovan Hill and Peddle Thorp	State Library of Queensland	Stanley Place, South Brisbane	Queensland	Cultural	Emil Sodersten Award for Interior Architecture, 2007 (Qld); Brisbane Building of the Year 2007 (Qld); FDG Stanley Award for Public Buildings, 2007 (Qld)
2006	Hassell and John Wardle Architects	Kaurna Building	University of South Australia, 2 Fenn Place, Adelaide	South Australia	Education	New Building Award, 2006 (SA); Interiors Award, 2006 (SA)
2005	Denton Corker Marshall	Anzac Hall	Australian War Memorial, Canberra	Australian Capital Territory	War Memorial	Canberra Medallion, 2005 (ACT)
2004	MGT Architects with Romaldo Giurgola, Architect	St Patrick's Cathedral, Parramatta	1 Marist Place, Parramatta	New South Wales	Religion	
2003	Richard Leplastrier, Peter Stutchbury and Sue Harper	Birabahn, Indigenous Centre	Wollotuka Institute, University of Newcastle, Callaghan, Newcastle	New South Wales	Education	Public Architecture Award, 2003 (NSW)
2002	John Wardle Architects; DesignInc Melbourne	RMIT Biosciences Building Bundoora Campus	Bundoora, Melbourne	Victoria	Education	Architecture Award, New institutional building, 2002 (Vic)
2001	Denton Corker Marshall	Melbourne Museum	Carlton Gardens, Melbourne	Victoria	Cultural	Victorian Architecture Medal, 2001; William Wardell Award for Public Architecture, 2001
2000	MGT Architects	The Scientia	University of New South Wales, Kensington	New South Wales	Education	Sir John Sulman Medal, 2000
1999	Glen Murcutt, Wendy Lewin, Reg Lark	Arthur and Yvonne Boyd Education Centre, (Bundanon)	Bundanon, 533 Bundanon Road, Illaroo	New South Wales	Cultural	Sir John Sulman Medal, 1999
1998	Hassell	Olympic Park station	Sydney Olympic Park	New South Wales	Transport	New South Wales Enduring Architecture Award, 2023; Sir John Sulman Medal, 1998
1997	Lawrence Nield & Partners Australia & John Mainwaring & Associates	University of the Sunshine Coast College Library	90 Sippy Downs Drive, Sippy Downs, Sunshine Coast	Queensland	Education	BHP Colorbond Award, 1997; FDG Stanley Award for Public Buildings, 1997 (Qld); Regional Commendation, 1997 (Qld); Robin Gibson Award for Enduring Architecture, 2026 (Qld)
1996	Denton Corker Marshall	Melbourne Convention & Exhibition Centre	South Wharf, Melbourne	Victoria	Cultural	Sir Osborne McCutcheon Award for Commercial Architecture, 1996 (Victoria)
1995	Patricia Les, Department for Building Management Consultancy Services	Swallowcliffe School	18 Swallociffe Road, Davoren Park, Adelaide	South Australia	Education	Community Environment Art and Design Award; Civic Trust Award; BHP Award
1994	Glenn Murcutt and Troppo Architects	Bowali Visitors Centre and Headquarters	Kakadu National Park, Kakadu Highway, Jabiru	Northern Territory	Cultural	Northern Territory Enduring Architecture Award, 2018; Northern Territory Enduring Architecture Award, 2018; Colorbond Award for Steel Architecture, 1994 (National Award); People's Choice Award, 1994 (NT Chapter); Tracy Memorial Award, 1994 (NT Chapter)
1993	Forbes and Fitzhardinge	Stirling Station, Northern Suburbs Transit System Public Buildings	Stirling, Perth	Western Australia	Transport	
1992	Tompkins Shaw & Evans and Daryl Jackson, Architects in Association	Great Southern Stand	Melbourne Cricket Ground	Victoria	Sport	Maggie Edmond Enduring Architecture Award, 2020; Victorian Architecture Medal, 1992
1991	Raffen Maron Architects (Guy Maron)	Adelaide Botanic Gardens Conservatory (now Bicentennial Conservatory)	Adelaide Botanic Gardens	South Australia	Cultural	Jack Cheesman Award for Enduring Architecture, 2014
1990	Gregory Burgess	Brambuk: Living Cultural Centre (now The National Parks and Cultural Centre)	277 Grampians Road, Halls Gap	Victoria	Cultural	National Award for Enduring Architecture, 2023; Maggie Edmond Enduring Architecture Award, 2023
1989	Mitchell/Giurgola & Thorp Architects	New Australian Parliament House	Canberra	Australian Capital Territory	Public Service	National Award for Enduring Architecture, 2013; Sir Roy Grounds Award for Enduring Architecture, 2013; Canberra Medallion, 1989
1988	Australian Construction Services in association with Bligh Robinson Architects	Brisbane Airport Terminal	Airport Drive, Brisbane Airport	Queensland	Transport	
1987	Peter McIntyre, McIntyre Partnership (*Joint Winner)	Dinner Plain Alpine Village	Sorrel Place, Dinner Plain	Victoria	Tourism	
1987	Harry Seidler and Associates (*Joint Winner)	Riverside Centre	123 Eagle Street, Brisbane	Queensland	Commercial	Robin Dods Triennial Medal, 1989 (Qld); Robin Gibson Award for Enduring Architecture, 2011
1986	Department of Housing and Construction with Ancher Mortlock & Woolley	Cadets Mess	Australian Defence Force Academy, Northcott Drive, Campbell	Australian Capital Territory	Defence	
1985	Philip Cox & Partners	Ayers Rock Resort (now Sails in the Desert)	Yulara	Northern Territory	Tourism	National Award for Enduring Architecture, 2019; Northern Territory Enduring Architecture Award, 2019
1984	Daryl Jackson	National Sports Centre Swimming Halls	Australian Institute of Sport, Leverrier Crescent, Bruce	Australian Capital Territory	Sport	Canberra Medallion, 1984; RAIA National Award for Design Excellence; ACT Award for Enduring Architecture, 2012
1983	Cameron Chisholm and Nicol	Education Department Building	151 Royal Street, East Perth	Western Australia	Public Service	
1982	Robin Gibson & Partners Architects	Queensland Art Gallery	Stanley Place, South Brisbane	Queensland	Cultural	Robin Gibson Award for Enduring Architecture, 2004
1981	Daryl Jackson Evan Walker Architects	Canberra School of Art (now Australian National University School of Art and Design)	105 Childers Street, Acton, Canberra	Australian Capital Territory	Education	CS Daley Medal, 1981 (ACT)

== Gallery of awarded projects ==
Sir Zelman Cowen Award for Public Architecture Award Winners
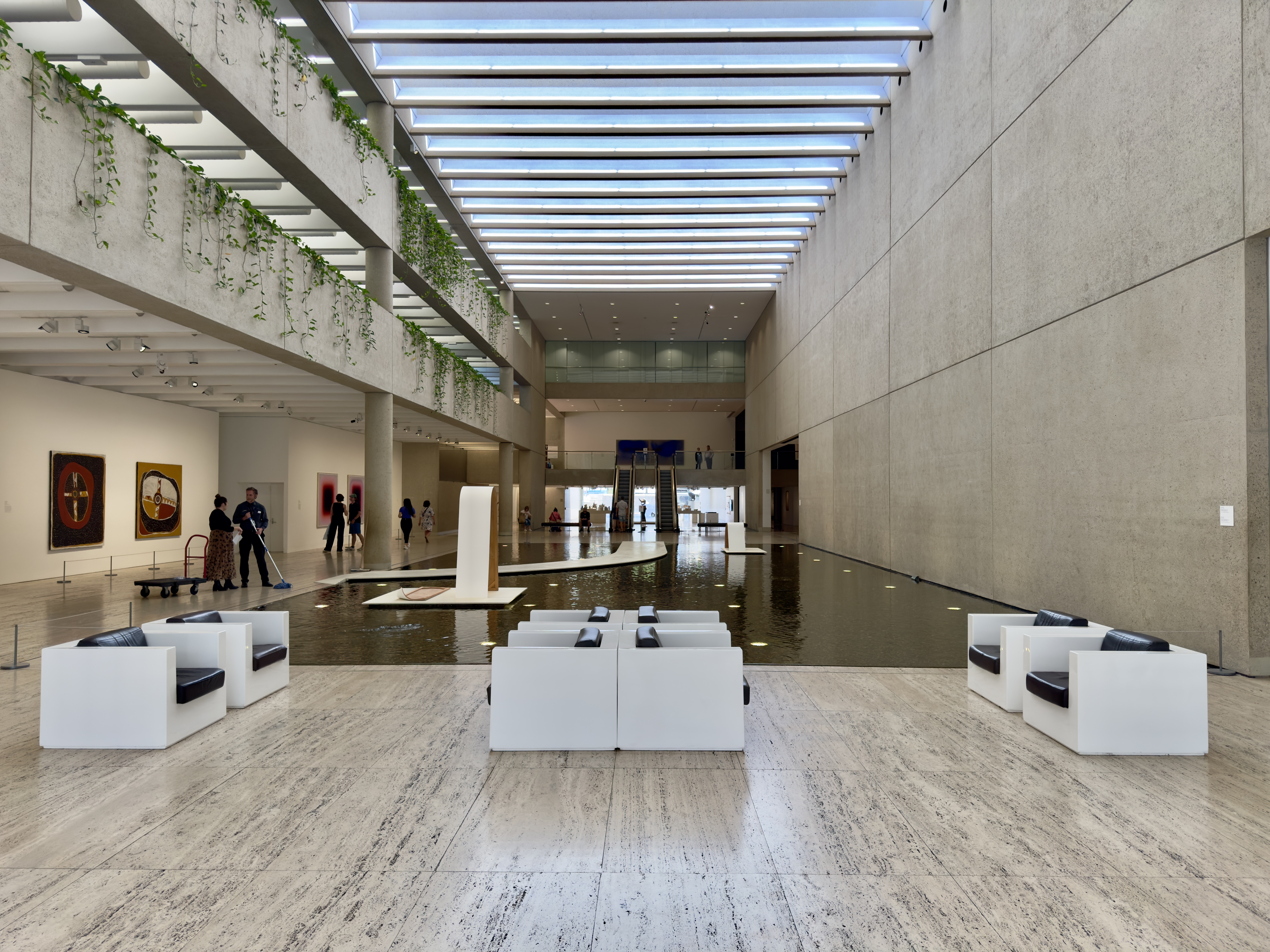
1982 Award, Queensland Art Gallery, Brisbane, Queensland

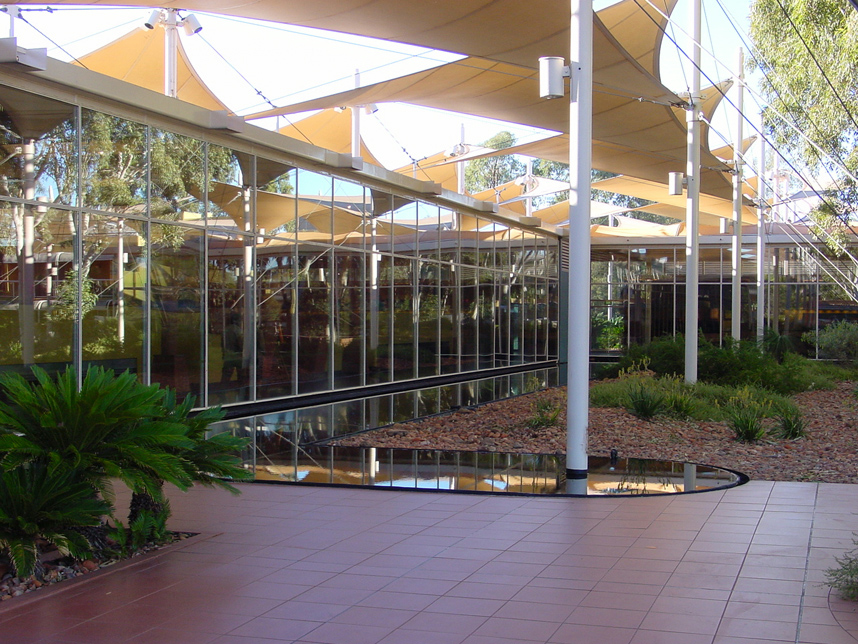
1985 Award, Sails in the Desert, Yulara, Northern Territory

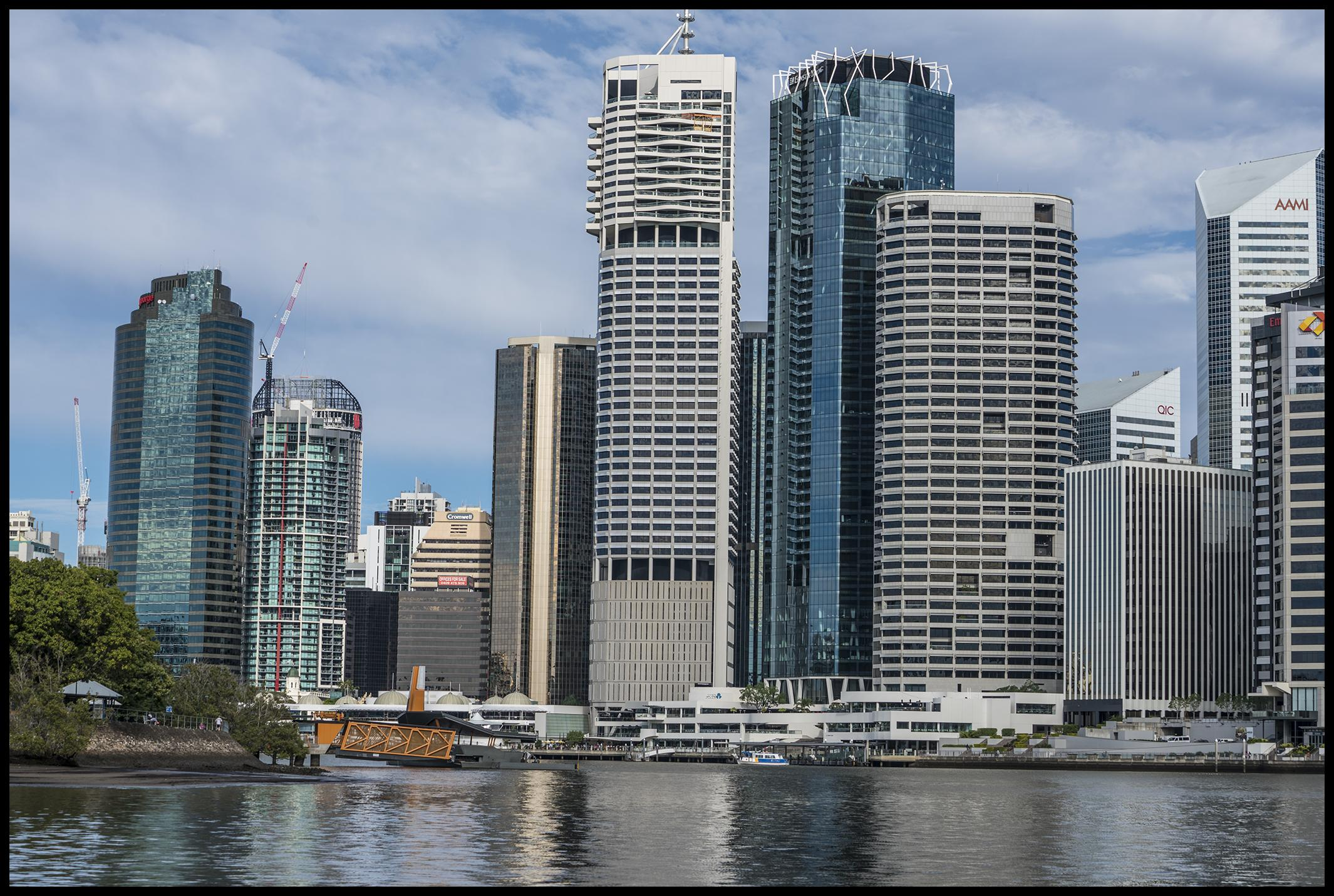
1987 Award (Joint), Riverside Centre, Brisbane, Queensland

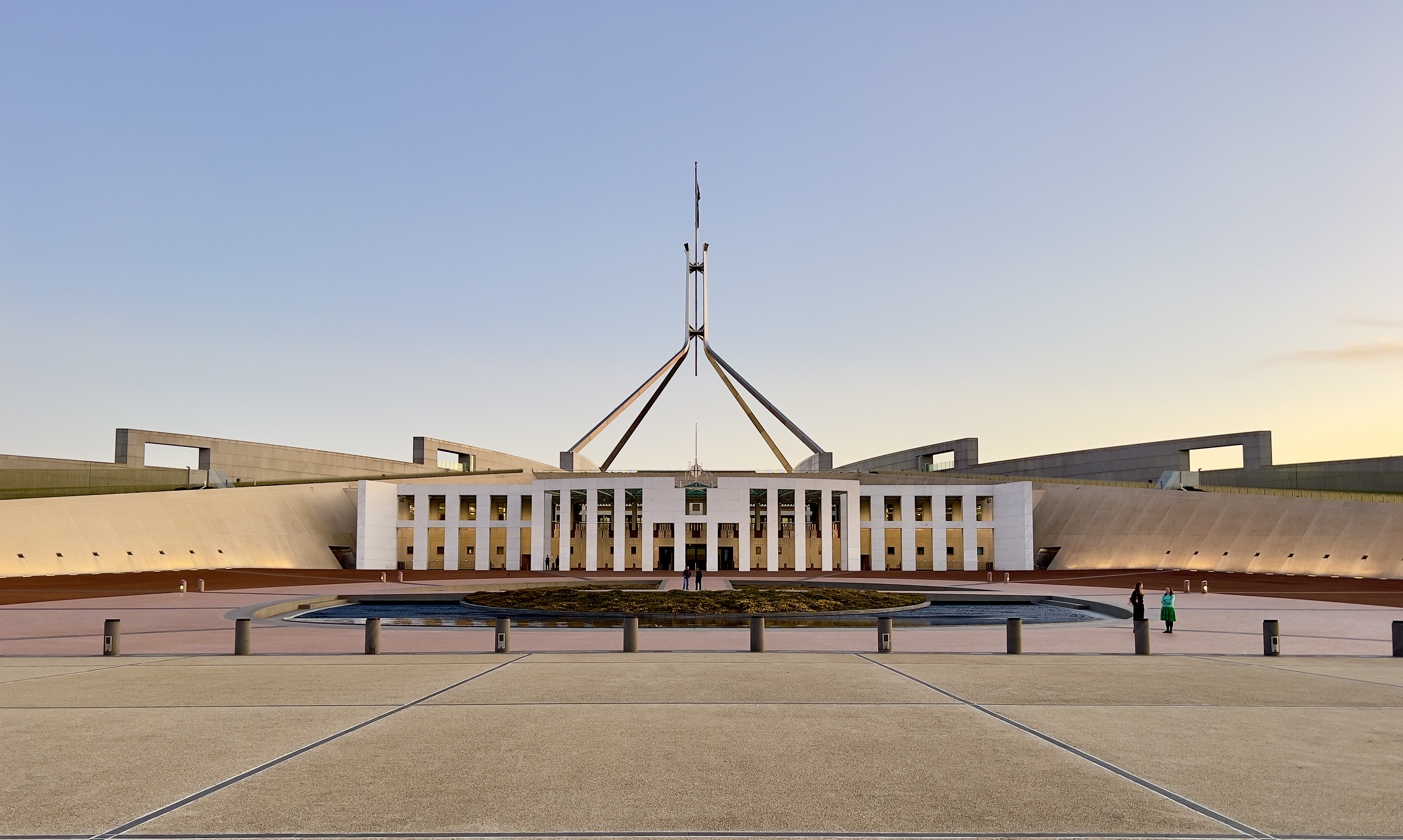
1989 Award, New Australian Parliament House, Canberra, ACT

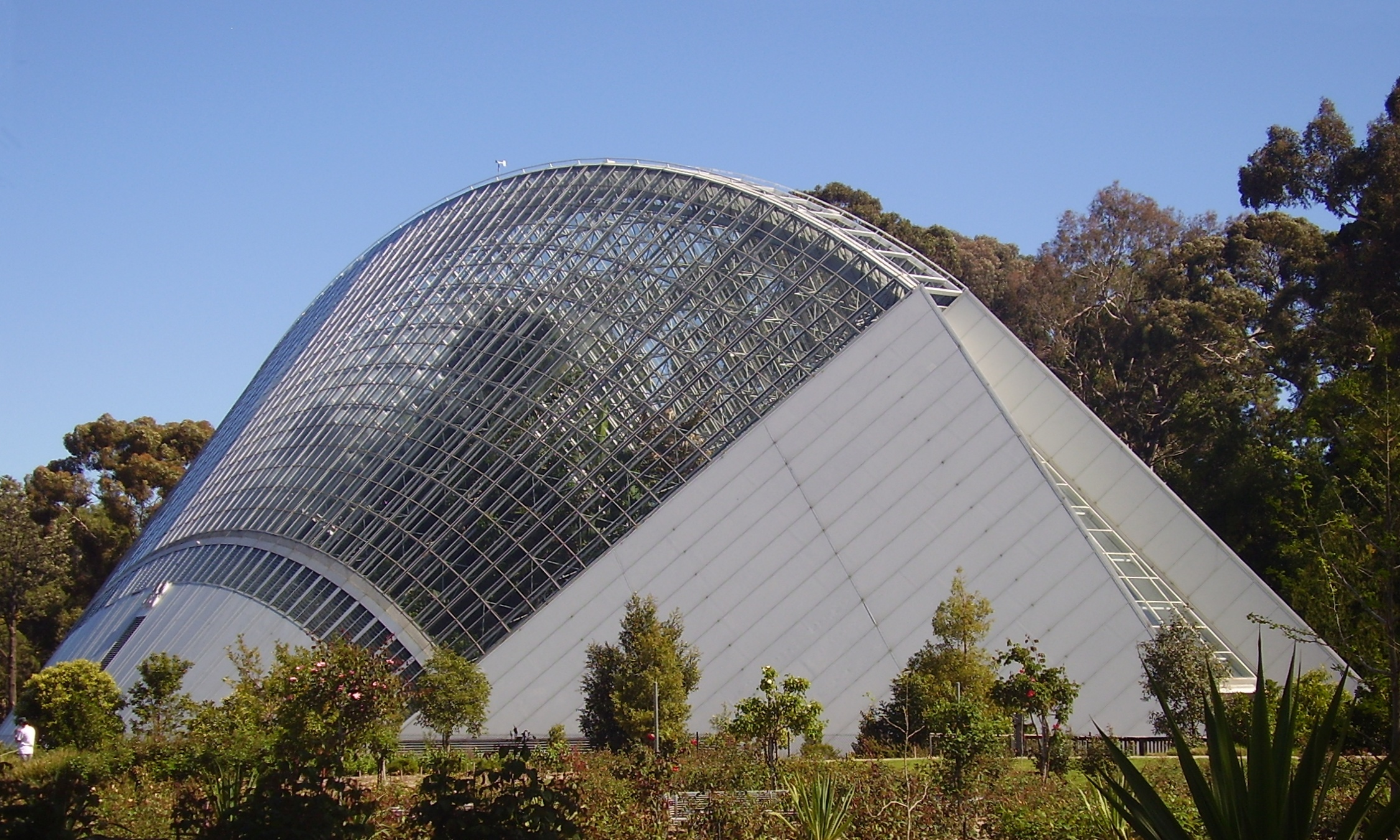
1991 Award, Bicentennial Conservatory, Adelaide, SA

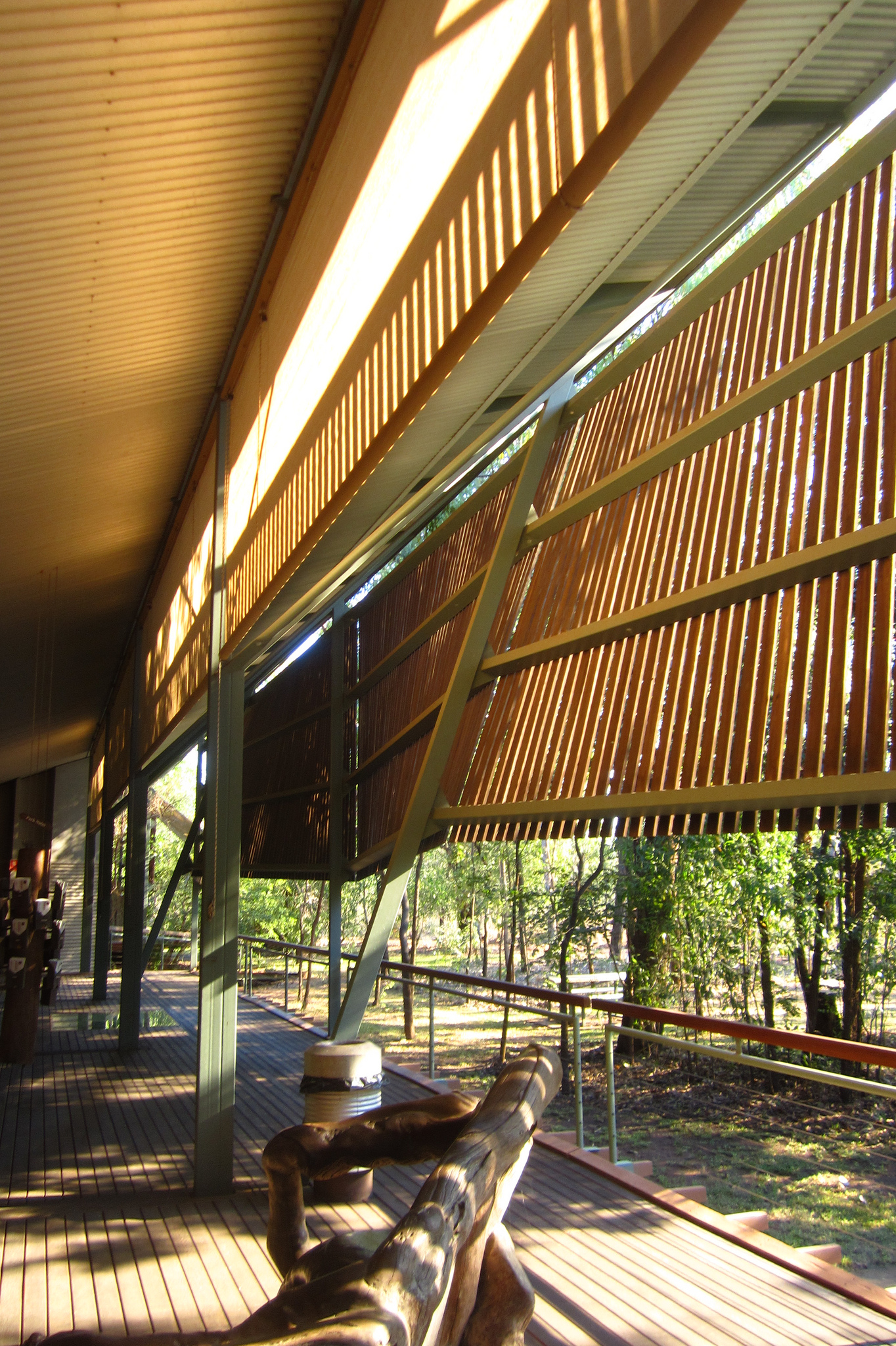
1994 Award, Bowali Visitors Centre and Headquarter, Kakadu, NT

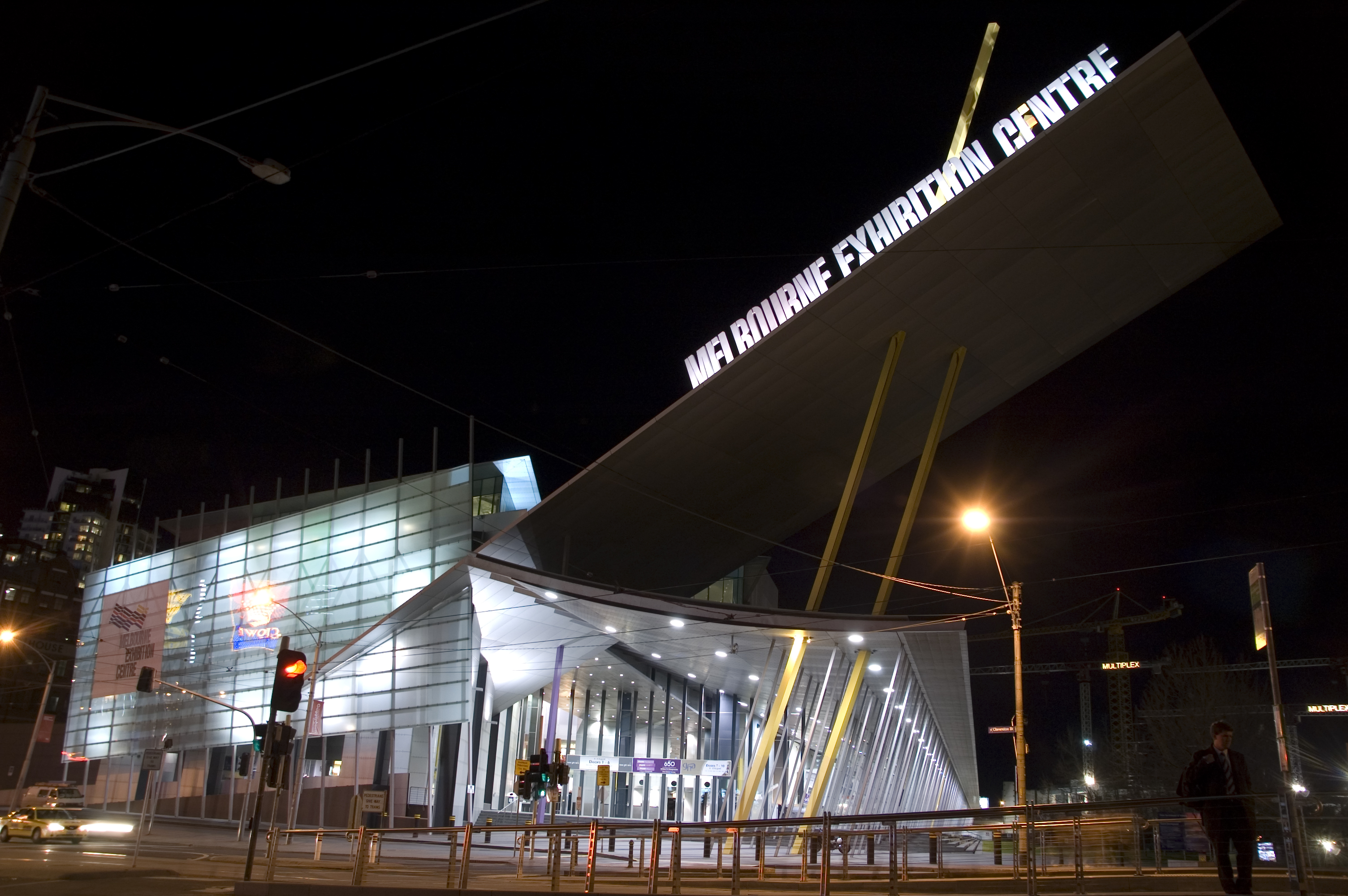
1996 Award, Melbourne Exhibition Centre, Melbourne, Victoria

1999 Award, Arthur and Yvonne Boyd Education Centre, Bundanon, New South Wales

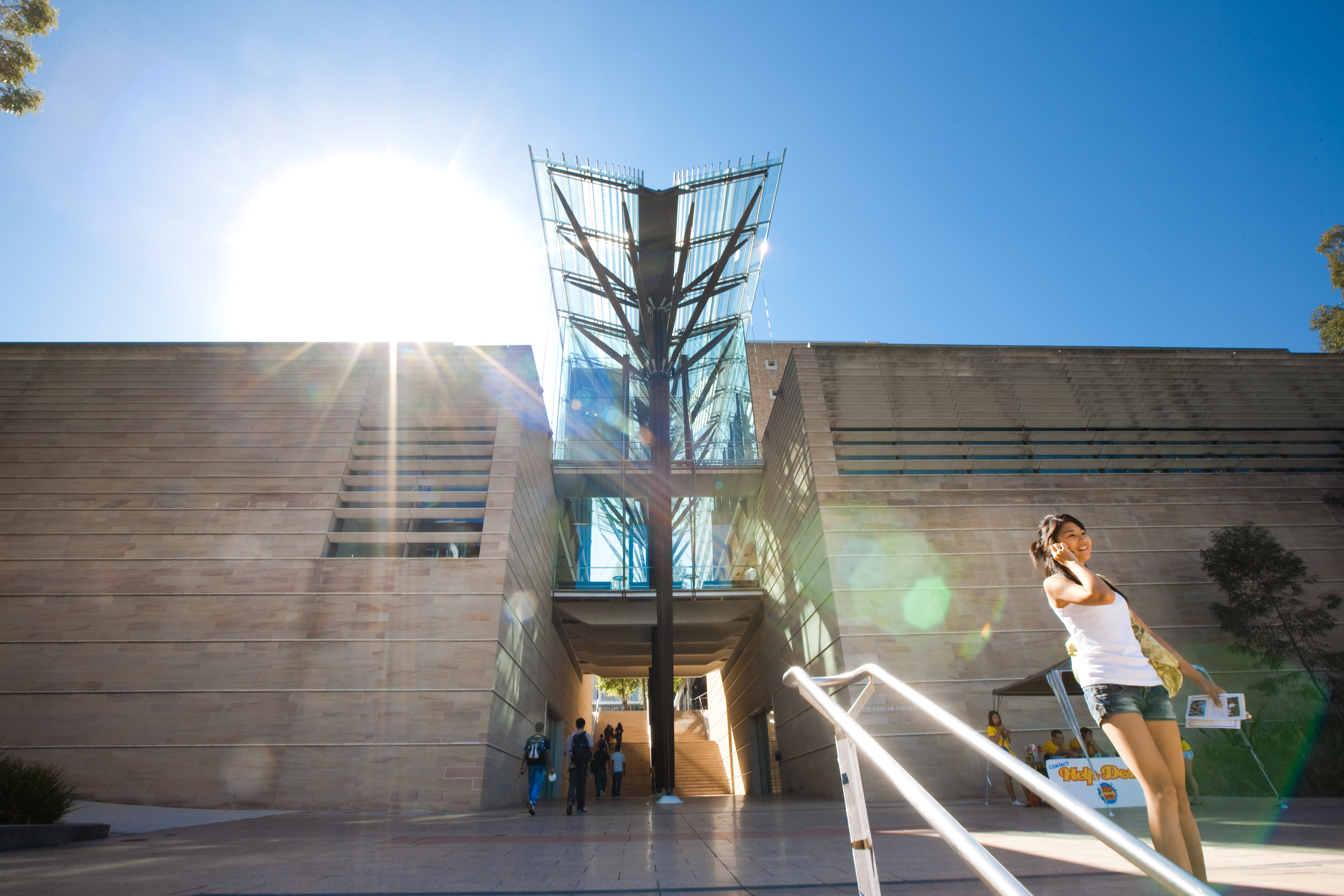
2000 Award, John Niland Scientia Building, University of New South Wales, Sydney

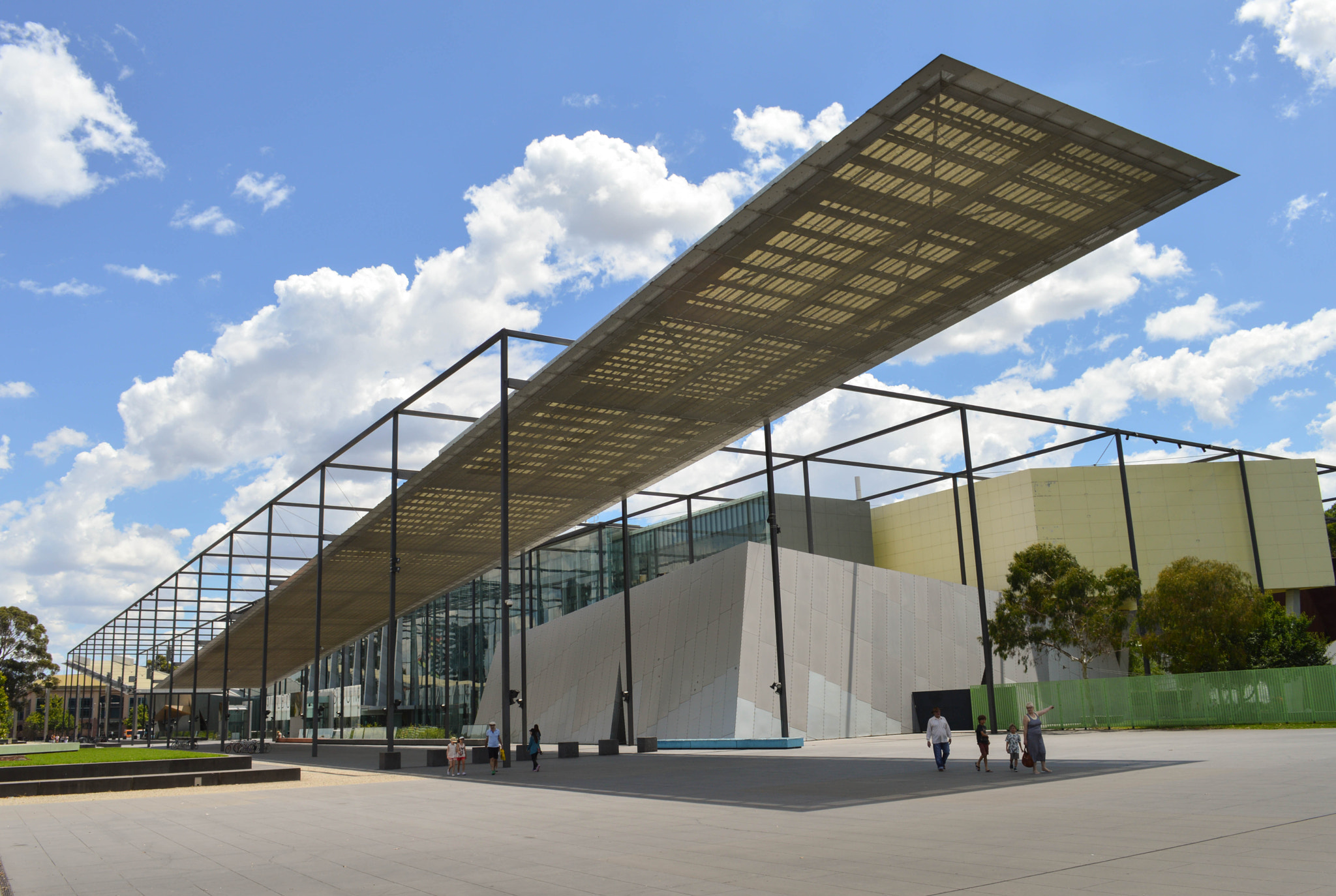
2001 Award, Melbourne Museum, Melbourne, Victoria

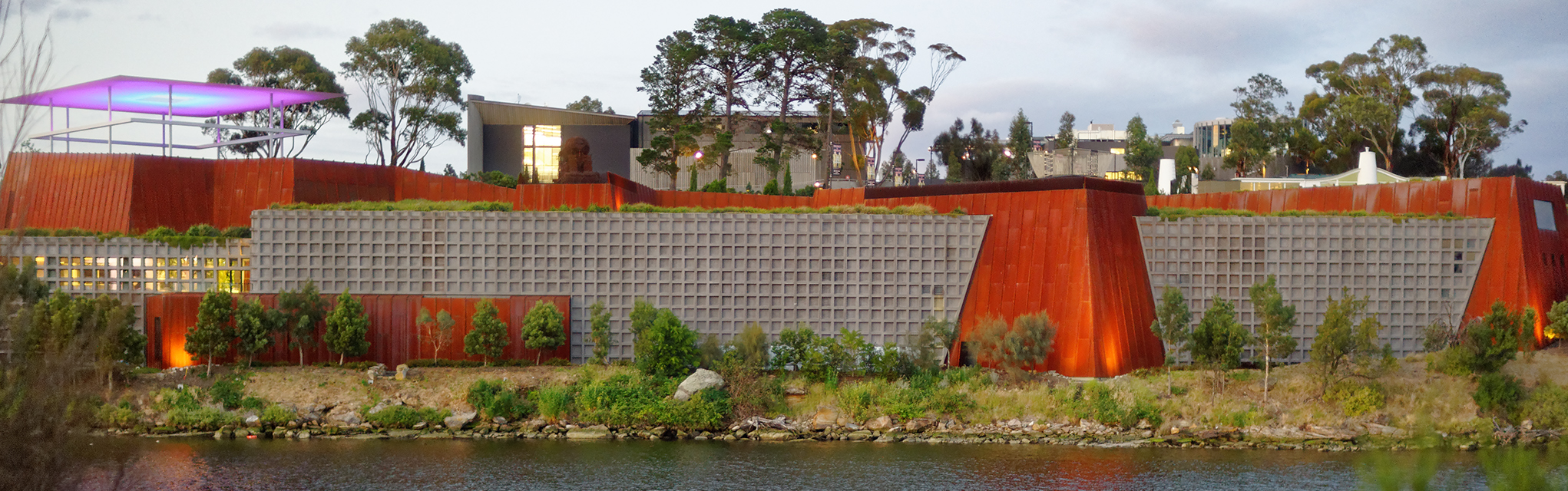
2012 Award, MONA, Hobart, Tasmania

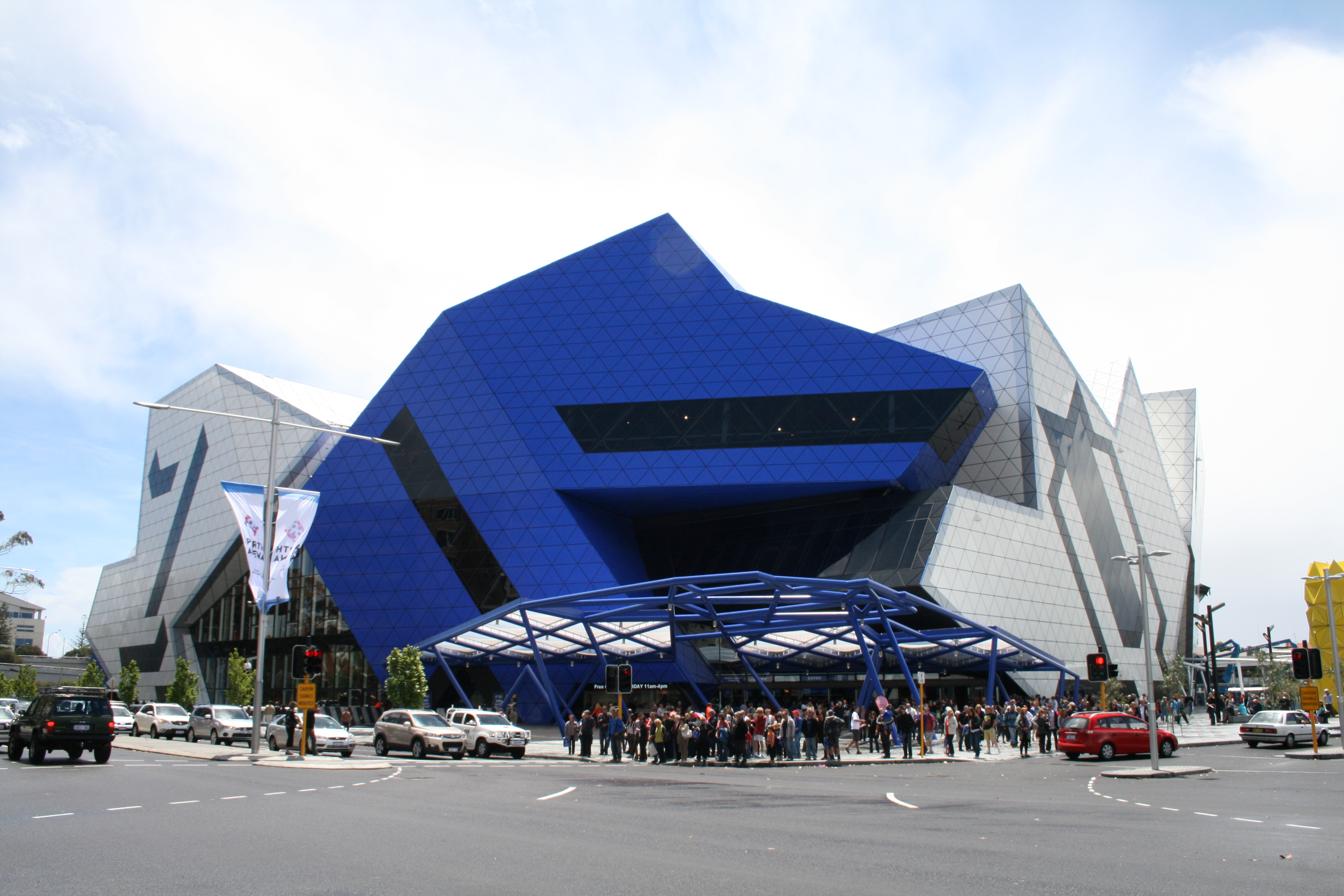
2013 Award, Perth Arena, Western Australia

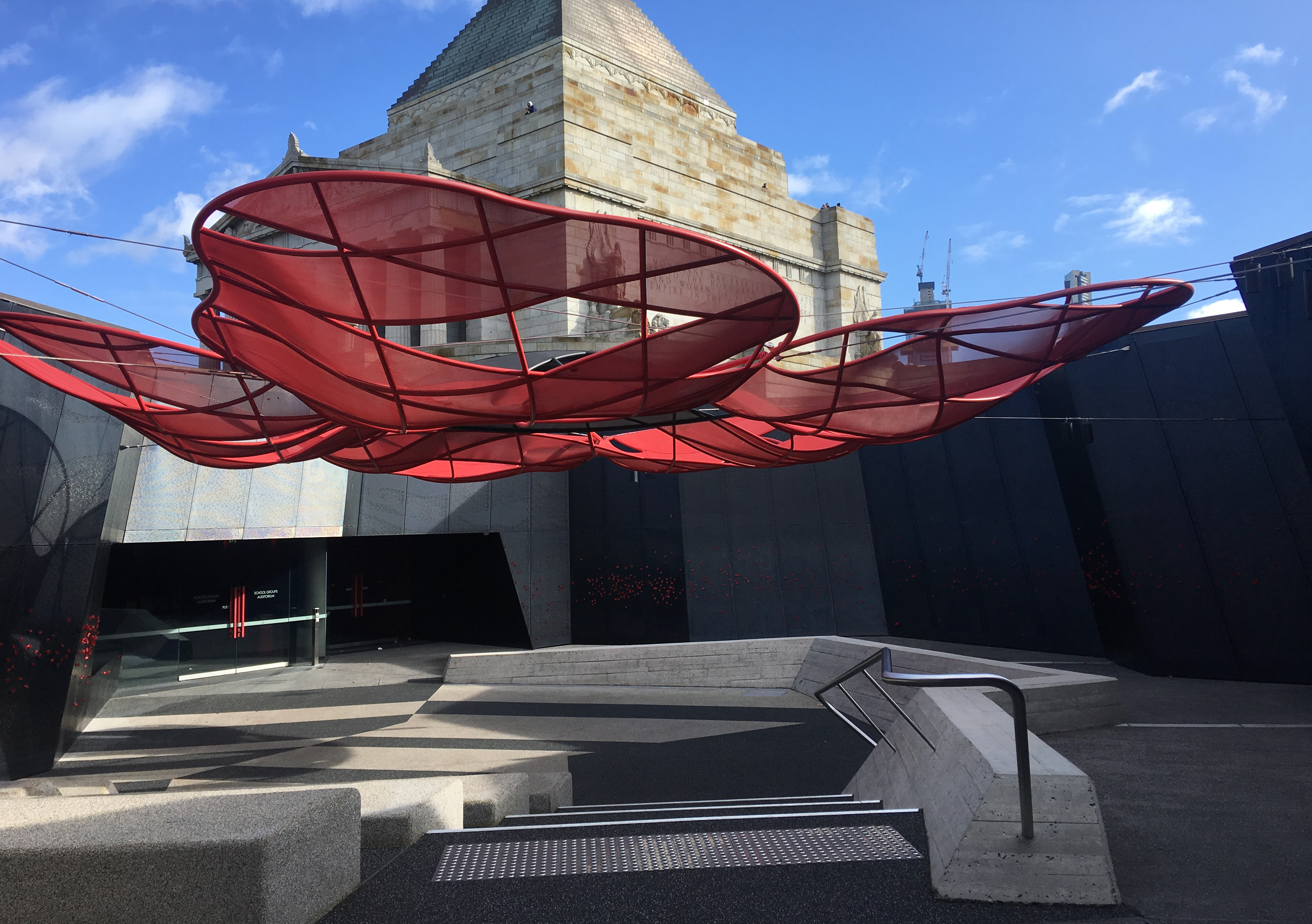
2015 Award, Shrine of Remembrance (Education Courtyard), Melbourne, Victoria

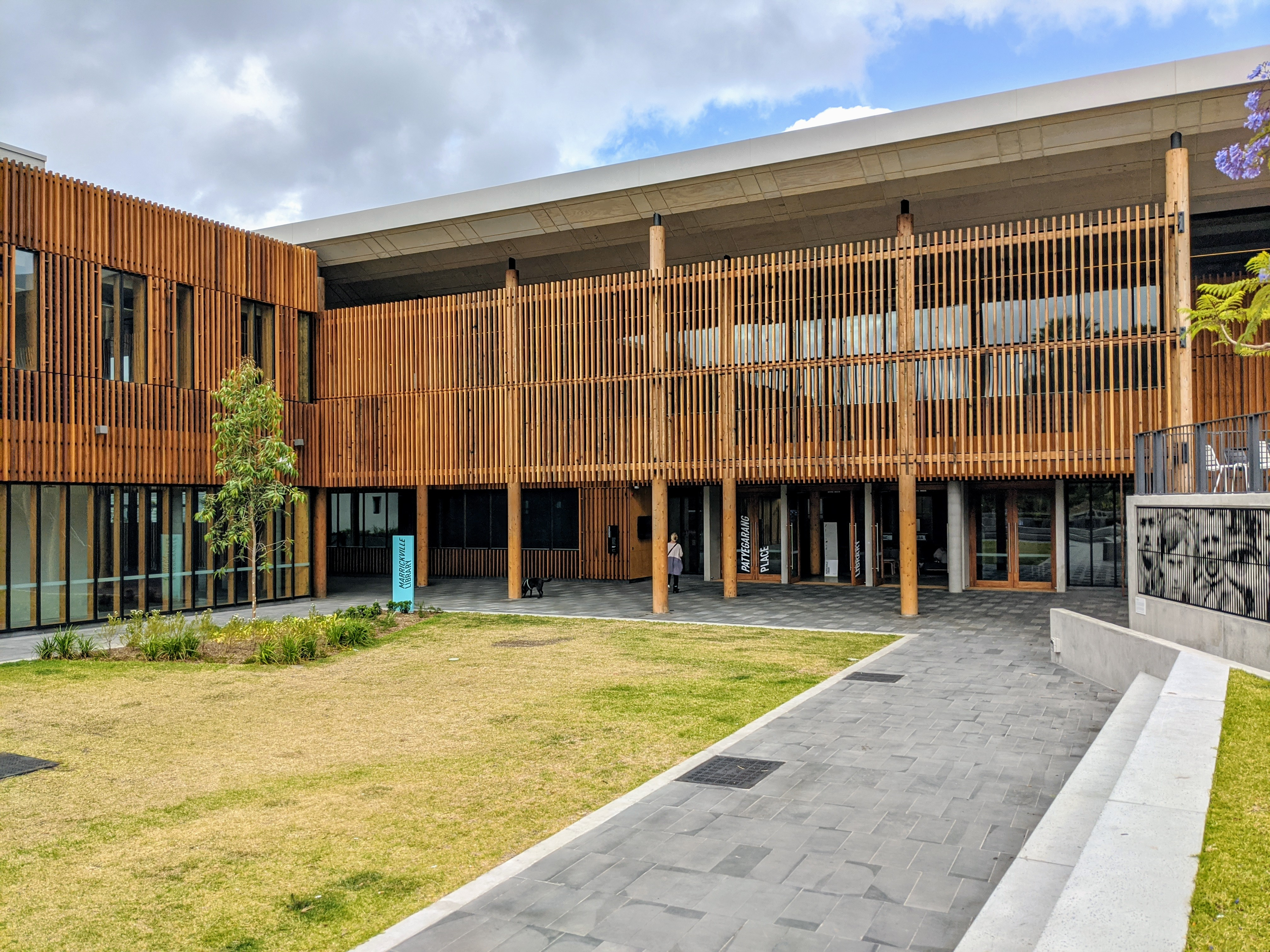
2020 Award, Marrickville Library, New South Wales

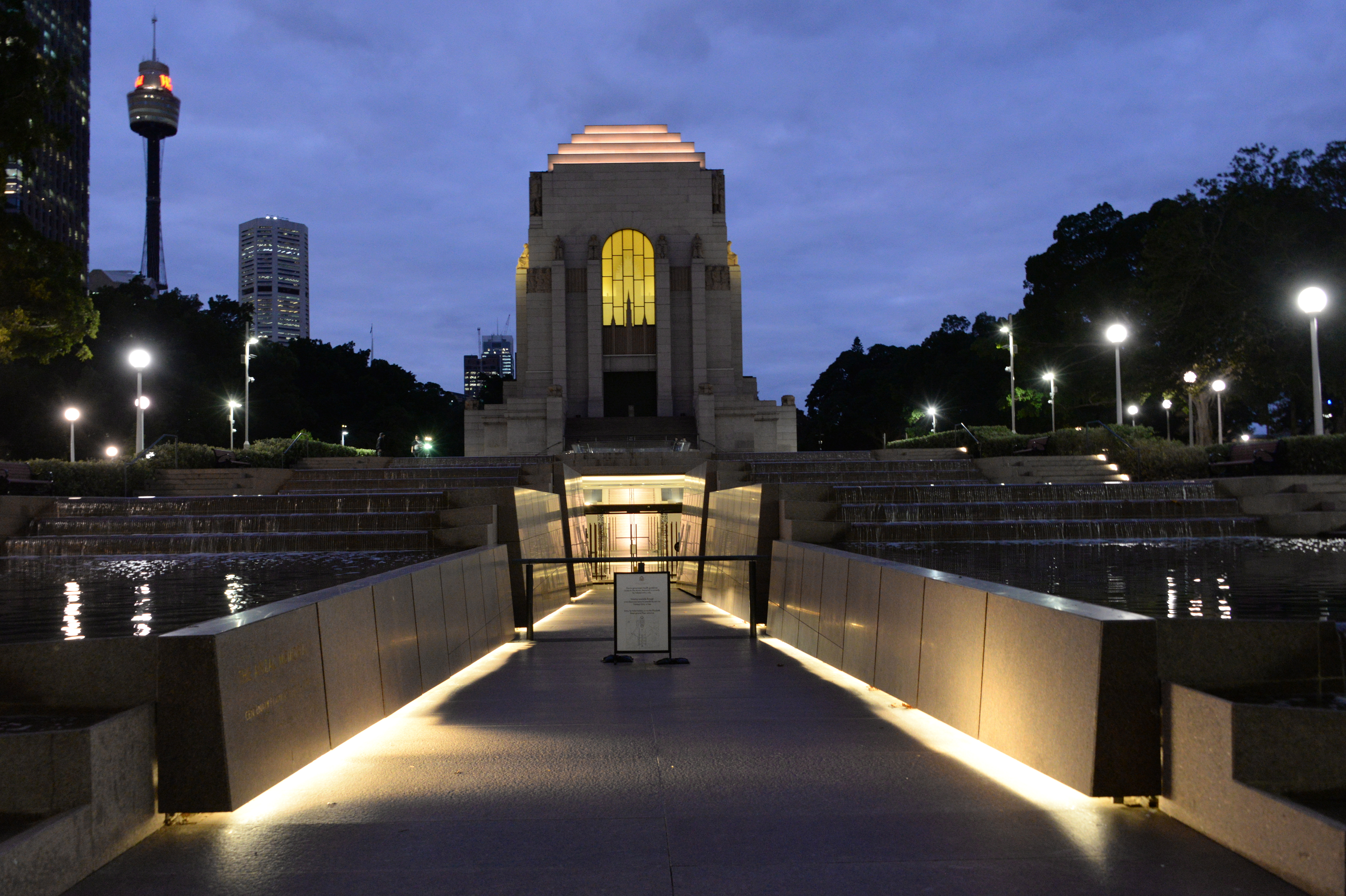
2020 Award, Anzac Memorial Centenary Extension, New South Wales

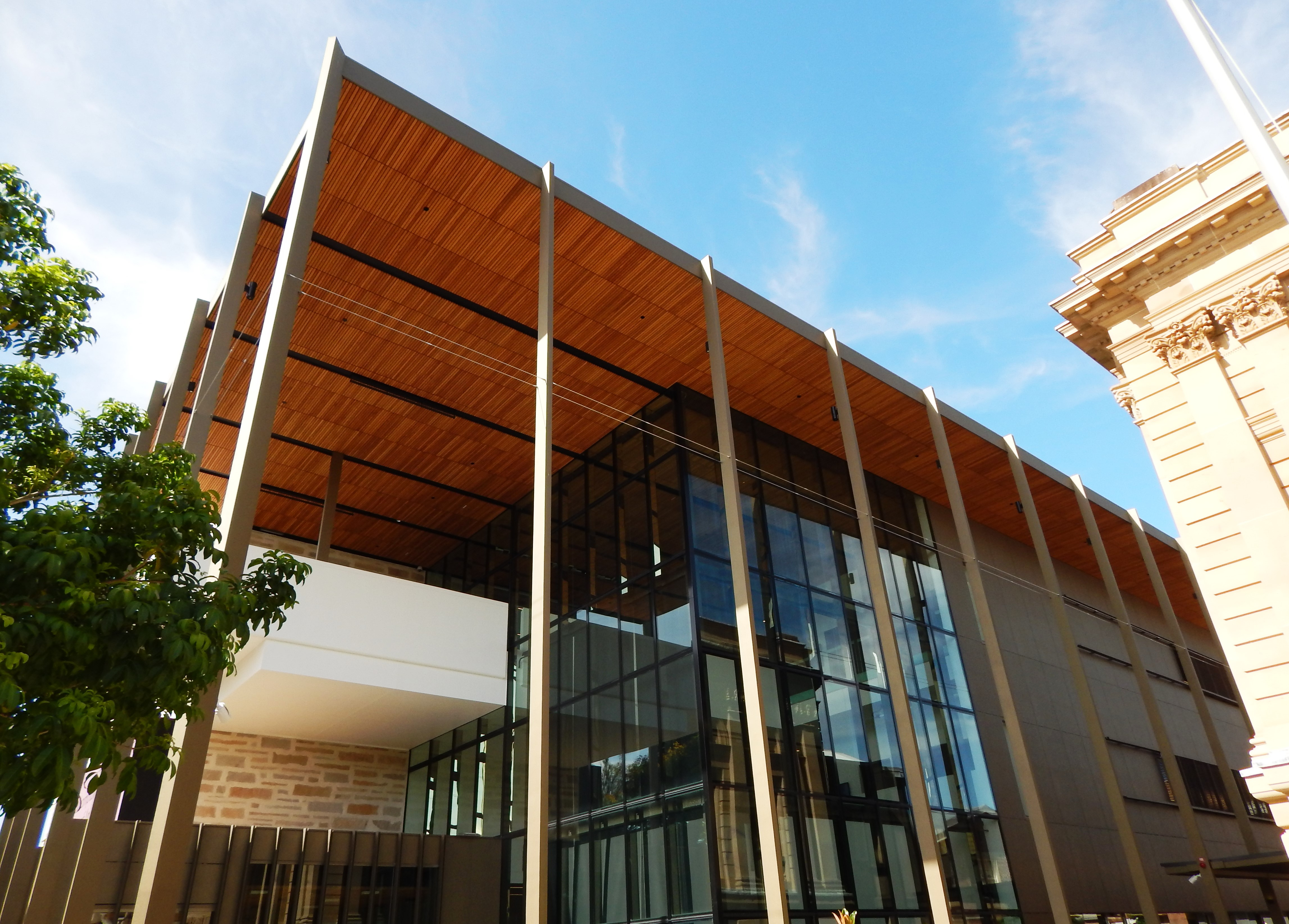
2023 Award, Rockhampton Museum of Art, Queensland

== Distribution of Awards ==
The first ten years of the Sir Zelman Cowen Award saw a wide distribution of winners by location with three winners in the Australian Capital Territory, three in Queensland, two in Victoria and one each in Northern Territory and Western Australia. An award was not first made in New South Wales until 1998 for Olympic Park Station. Around 60% of awarded buildings were paid for with public funds and 40% with private funding. Cultural projects have accounted for around 44% of all awards, followed by education (21%) and transport (8%).

Awards by Australian state or territory, 1981—2026, by location of building (total 48 awards)
1. New South Wales (25.0%)
2. Victoria (20.8%)
3. Queensland (16.7%)
4. Tasmania (2.10%)
5. Western Australia (6.30%)
6. Northern Territory (6.30%)
7. South Australia (8.30%)
8. Australian Capital Territory (14.6%)

== Commendations (1981—2006) ==
From the inception of the award commendations were an optional award allocated at the jury's discretion. Only six commendations were given in the first ten years of the award. Fourteen were awarded in the next decade (between 1992 and 2001), and overall 26 commendations were made in 24 years, averaging around one per year.

Sir Zelman Cowen Award Commendations 1982—2006
Year	Commendation	Architect	Project	Location	State	Type	Other AIA awards
1982	Commendation	John Andrews	American Express Tower	380 George Street, Sydney	New South Wales	Commercial	
1983	Commendation	Stapleton Architects	Territory Insurance Office	66 Smith Street, Darwin	Northern Territory	Commercial	
1983	Commendation	Glenn Murcutt	Kempsey Museum and Tourist Information Centre	62 Lachlan Street, South Kempsey	New South Wales	Cultural	
1984	Commendation	New South Wales Government Architect	Parklea Prison	66 Sentry Drive, Parklea, Sydney	New South Wales	Corrections	Sir John Sulman Medal, 1984
1987	Commendation	Robert Woodward	Cascade Court Fountain	Lyric Theatre, Queensland Performing Arts Centre	Queensland	Public Space	
1989	Commendation	Edmond and Corrigan	Dandenong College of TAFE, Stage 3, 1985—1988	121 Stud Road, Dandenong	Victoria	Education	
1992	Commendation	Strine Design	Googong Dam Amenities Block	Googong Dam, Googong	New South Wales	Infrastructure	
1993	Commendation	SACON (Architect Carlo Gnezda)	Adelaide Velodrome	State Sports Park, Main North Road, Gepps Cross	South Australia	Sport	
1996	High Commendation	Gregory Burgess	Uluṟu-Kata Tjuṯa Cultural Centre	Uluru Road, Uluṟu-Kata Tjuṯa National Park	Northern Territory	Cultural	Northern Territory Enduring Architecture Award, 2025; Tracy Memorial Award, 1995 (NT); New Institutional Building Award, 1996 (NT); People's Choice Award, 1996 (NT)
1996	Commendation	Peddle Thorp & Walker and Robert Dickson Architects	Art Gallery of South Australia Additions	North Terrace, Adelaide	South Australia	Cultural	
1996	Commendation	Bligh Voller Architects in association with Lend Lease Design	Brisbane International Airport	Brisbane	Queensland	Transport	
1997	Commendation	Grose Bradley	Architecture Studios	University of Newcastle	New South Wales	Education	Sir John Sulman Medal, 1997
1998	Commendation	Wood Marsh in association with Pels Innes Nielson Kosloff	RMIT Building 220 (later known as Leo Foster Building, since 2014)	RMIT Bundoora Campus, Bundoora	Victoria	Education	William Wardell Award for Public Architecture, 1998
1999	Commendation	Denton Corker Marshall	Faculty of Arts and Design	Monash University	Western Australia	Education	
1999	Commendation	Bligh Voller Neild	Faculty of Arts	University of the Sunshine Coast	Queensland	Education	
1999	Commendation	Nation Fender Katsalidis	Ian Potter Museum of Art	University of Melbourne	Victoria	Education	Victorian Architecture Medal, 2019; Melbourne Prize Commendation, 1999
2000	Commendation	John Wardle Architects and Demaine	Printing Facility	RMIT	Victoria	Education	
2000	Commendation	Bligh Voller Nield	New South Wales Tennis Centre	Sydney Olympic Park	New South Wales	Sport	Sir John Sulman Medal, 2000
2001	Commendation	Peter Elliott Architects	Faculty of Arts Precinct	University of Tasmania	Hobart, Tasmania	Education	
2002	Commendation	Nation Fender Katsalidis	Sidney Myer Asia Centre	University of Melbourne, Melbourne	Victoria	Education	
2003	Commendation	Sean Godsell Architects	Woodleigh School Science Building	485 Golf Links Road, Langwarrin South	Victoria	Education	William Wardell Award for Public Architecture, 2003
2004	Commendation	Johnson Pilton Walker	New Asian Galleries	Art Gallery of New South Wales	New South Wales	Cultural	
2004	Commendation	Hassell & MGT Canberra Architects in association	State Library of South Australia Redevelopment	North Terrace, Adelaide	South Australia	Cultural	
2005	Commendation	Project Services (Queensland Government)	Cooloola Sunshine Institute of TAFE, Noosa Centre	Cooloola	Queensland	Education	
2005	Commendation	HOK Sport+Venue+Event and PDT Architects	Suncorp Stadium	Brisbane	Queensland	Sport	

== National Awards and National Commendations (Since 2007) ==
Since 2007 the Award was changed from only awarding Commendations to awarding the named award (Sir Zelman Cowen Award) as the highest award (see table above), a National Award for Public Architecture (equivalent to a High Commendation) and a National Commendation for Public Architecture. A total of 72 commendations have been awarded from 2007 to 2024 (18 years), at an average of four National Awards/National Commendations per annum, in addition to the named award.

Sir Zelman Cowen Award National Awards and Commendations since 2007
Year	Commendation	Architect	Project	Location	State	Type	Other AIA awards
2007	National Award	Lyons	John Curtin School of Medical Research	Curtin University	Western Australia	Education	
2007	National Award	Architectus	Gallery of Modern Art, Brisbane	Brisbane	Queensland	Cultural	
2008	National Award	John Wardle Architects	Nigel Peck Centre for Learning and Leadership	Melbourne Grammar School, 47 Domain Road, Melbourne	Victoria	Education	Victorian Architecture Medal, 2008; William Wardell Award for Public Architecture, 2008; Emil Sodersten Award for Interior Architecture, 2008
2008	National Award	ARM Architecture	Albury Library Museum	Albury, New South Wales	New South Wales	Cultural	
2008	National Award	Robert Simeoni Architects	Seaford Life Saving Club	10N Nepean Highway, Seaford	Victoria	Sport	
2008	National Commendation	John Wardle Architects and Joint Project Delivery with Hassell	Hawke Building	University of South Australia, Adelaide	South Australia	Education	
2008	National Commendation	MCG5 Sports Architects (Consortium of Jackson Architects, Cox Architecture, Tompkins Shaw and Evans Architects, HOK and Hassell)	Melbourne Cricket Ground Redevelopment	Melbourne	Victoria	Sport	
2009	National Award	Candelapas Associates	All Saints Primary School (now All Saints Grammar)	17 Cecilia Street, Belmore, Sydney	New South Wales	Education	Sir John Sulman Medal, 2009
2009	National Award	Candelapas Associates	Monash Centre for Electron Microscopy	Monash University	Victoria	Education	
2009	National Commendation	FJMT (Francis-Jones Morehen Thorp)	Faculty of Law, Library	Camperdown Campus, University of Sydney	New South Wales	Education	
2010	National Award	FJMT (Francis-Jones Morehen Thorp)	Surry Hills Library and Community Centre	Crown Street, Surry Hills	New South Wales	Cultural	
2010	National Award	Joint Venture Architects Woods Bagot and NH	Melbourne Convention and Exhibition Centre	South Wharf, Melbourne	Victoria	Cultural	Melbourne Prize, 2010; William Wardell Award for Public Architecture, 2010; Steel Architecture Award, 2010; Award for Sustainable Architecture, 2010
2010	National Commendation	Brian Hooper Architect and m3architecture architects in association	Barcaldine Tree of Knowledge Memorial	Barcaldine	Queensland	Cultural	
2011	National Award	Cox Architecture	AAMI Park	Melbourne	Victoria	Sport	Victorian Architecture Medal, 2011; Melbourne Prize, 2011; William Wardell Award for Public Architecture, 201; Colorbond Award for Steel Architecture, 2011
2011	National Award	BVN Architecture	Brain and Mind Research Institute, Youth Mental Health Building	100 Mallett Street, Camperdown	New South Wales	Health	Sir John Sulman Medal, 2011
2011	National Commendation	John Wardle Architects	Learning Commons and Exercise Sports Science Project	Footscray Campus, Victoria University	Victoria	Education	
2012	National Award	BVN Architecture	Narbethong Community Hall	Narbethong	Queensland	Cultural	
2012	National Award	Billiard Leece Partnership and Bates Smart	Royal Children's Hospital	50 Flemington Road, Parkville	Victoria	Health	Victorian Architecture Medal, 2012; Melbourne Prize, 2012; William Wardell Award for Public Architecture, 2012
2012	National Award	BVN Architecture	Ravenswood School for Girls	10 Henry Street, Gordon	New South Wales	Education	Sir John Sulman Medal, 2012
2012	National Commentation	Silvester Fuller	Dapto Anglican Church Auditorium	Lot 100 Moombara Street, Dapto	New South Wales	Religion	Public Architecture Award, 2012 (NSW); Blacket Prize, 2012 (NSW)
2013	National Award	TAG Architects and Iredale Pedersen Hook architects, architects in association	West Kimberley Regional Prison	Kimberley	Western Australia	Corrections	
2013	National Award	Collins and Turner with City of Sydney	Waterloo Youth Family Community Centre	Waterloo, Sydney	New South Wales	Cultural	Sir John Sulman Medal, 2013; Sustainable Architecture Award, 2013 (NSW)
2013	National Award	Wilson Architects and Donovan Hill, architects in association	Translational Research Institute	37 Kent St, Woolloongabba, Brisbane	Queensland	Education	National Architecture Award for Interior Architecture, 2013; FDG Stanley Award for Public Architecture (Queensland), 2013; GHM Addison Award for Interior Architecture (Queensland), 2013; Commendation for Sustainable Architecture (Queensland), 2013
2013	National Award	Lyons	Swanston Academic Building (Building 80)	RMIT, Swanston Street, Melbourne	Victoria	Education	Victorian Public Architecture Award, 2013
2013	National Award	Sean Godsell Architects and Peddle Thorp Architects, architects in association	RMIT University Design Hub (Building 100)	RMIT, Swanston Street, Melbourne	Victoria	Education	Victorian Architecture Medal, 2013 (Vic); William Wardell Award for Public Architecture, 2013 (Vic); Colorbond Award for Steel Architecture, 2013 (Vic)
2013	National Award	Architectus and Guymer Bailey Architects architects in association	Queen Elizabeth II Courts of Law	415 George Street, Brisbane	Queensland	Justice	
2013	National Commendation	BVN Donovan Hill	Kinghorn Cancer Centre	370 Victoria Street, Darlinghurst, Sydney	New South Wales	Health	
2013	National Commendation	ARM Architecture	Hamer Hall	Melbourne	Victoria	Health	
2013	National Commendation	BVN Donovan Hill and Hames Sharley, architects in association	Braggs Building	University of Adelaide, Adelaide	South Australia	Education	
2014	National Award	Neeson Murcutt Architects in association with City of Sydney	Prince Alfred Park and Pool Upgrade	Surry Hills, Sydney	New South Wales	Sport	Sir John Sulman Medal, 2014; Lloyd Rees Award for Urban Design, 2014; City of Sydney Lord Mayor's Prize, 2014
2014	National Award	BVN Donovan Hill	Australian PlantBank	Mount Annan Drive, Mount Annan	New South Wales	Science	
2014	National Award	John Wardle Architects and Terroir, architects in association	Institute for Marine and Antarctic Studies	University of Tasmania, Hobart	Tasmania	Education	
2014	National Award	McBride Charles Ryan	Dallas Brooks Community Primary School	26–36 King Street, Dallas	Victoria	Education	Victorian Architecture Medal, 2014; Melbourne Prize, 2014; William Wardell Award for Public Architecture, 2014
2014	National Award	Bates Smart Whitefield McQueen Irwin Alsop Joint Venture	Dandenong Mental Health Facility	Dandenong Hospital, Dandenong	Victoria	Health	Victorian Public Architecture Award, 2014
2014	National Commendation	Durbach Block Jaggers in association with Peter Colquhoun	North Bondi Surf Life Saving Club	Ramsgate Avenue & Campbell Parade, North Bondi, Bondi Beach, Sydney	New South Wales	Sport	
2014	National Commendation	Woods Bagot	'South Australian Health and Medical Research Institute (SAHMRI)	North Terrace, Adelaide	South Australia	Health	
2015	National Award	Cox Architecture, Walter Brooke and Hames Sharley	Adelaide Oval Redevelopment	Adelaide	South Australia	Sport	
2015	National Commendation	Conrad Gargett and Lyons	Lady Cilento Children's Hospital (now Queensland Children's Hospital)	501 Stanley Street, South Brisbane	Queensland	Health	
2015	National Commendation	Fiona Stanley Hospital Design Collaboration (Hassell, Hames Sharley and Silver Thomas Hanley)	Fiona Stanley Hospital, Main Hospital Building	11 Robin Warren Drive, Murdoch	Western Australia	Health	
2015	National Commendation	NH Architecture and Populous	Margaret Court Arena	Melbourne Park, Melbourne	Victoria	Sport	
2016	National Award	Candalepas Associates	St Andrews House	Sydney	New South Wales	Health	
2016	National Award	PHAB Architects	The Condensery, Somerset Regional Art Gallery	29 Factory Road, Toogoolawah	Queensland	Cultural	Regional Commendation, 2016
2016	National Commendation	Kerry Hill Architects	City of Perth Library and Public Plaza	Perth	Western Australia	Cultural	
2016	National Commendation	Neeson Murcutt Architects	Kempsey Crescent Head Surf Life Saving Club	Kempsey	New South Wales	Sport	Sir John Sulman Medal, 2016 (NSW)
2017	National Award	Neeson Murcutt Architects in association with City of Sydney	Juanita Nielsen Community Centre	31 Nicholson Street, Woolloomooloo, Sydney	New South Wales	Cultural	
2017	National Award	Brian Hooper Architect and m3architecture, architects in association	The Globe Lookout	Barcaldine	Queensland	Cultural	
2017	National Award	Architectus	Sunshine Coast University Hospital	Sunshine Coast	Queensland	Health	
2017	National Commendation	m3architecture	Act for Kids Child and Family Centre of Excellence	James Cook University, Building 245, Douglas, Townsville	Queensland	Health	
2018	National Award	Peter Stutchbury Architecture in association with Design 5 — Architects for City of Sydney	Joynton Avenue Creative Centre and Precinct	Zetland	New South Wales	Cultural	
2018	National Award	Hassell, Cox Architecture and HKS	Optus Stadium	Perth	Western Australia	Sport	George Temple Poole Award, 2018 (WA); Jeffrey Howlett Award for Public Architecture, 2018 (WA); Wallace Greenham Award for Sustainability, 2018 (WA); Colorbond Award for Steel Architecture, 2018 (WA); Mondoluce Lighting Award, 2018 (WA)
2018	National Award	Candalepas Associates	Punchbowl Mosque (Punchbowl Masjid)	25-27 Matthews Street, Punchbowl, Sydney	New South Wales	Religion	Sir John Sulman Medal, 2018 (NSW)
2019	National Award	Peter Elliott Architecture and Urban Design	Parliament of Victoria Members’ Annexe	Spring Street, Melbourne	Victoria	Public Service	Victorian Architecture Medal, 2019 (Vic); Melbourne Prize, 2019 (Vic); Joseph Reed Award for Urban Design, 2019 (Vic); William Wardell Award for Public Architecture, 2019 (Vic); Allan and Beth Coldicutt Award for Sustainable Architecture, 2019 (Vic)
2019	National Award	ARM Architecture	HOTA Outdoor Stage	Gold Coast	Queensland	Cultural	FDG Stanley Award, 2019 (QLD)
2019	National Award	CHROFI with McGregor Coxall	Maitland Riverlink	Maitland	New South Wales	Cultural	Sir John Sulman Medal, 2019 (NSW); Blacket Prize, 2019 (NSW)
2019	National Commendation	FJMT	Port of Sale	70 Foster Street, Sale	Victoria	Cultural	Victoria Regional Prize, 2019; Victoria Public Architecture Award, 2019
2020	National Commendation	Harrison and White with Archier	Parks Victoria Albert Park Office and Depot	Albert Park	Victoria	Public Service	Award for Public Architecture, 2020 (Vic)
2020	National Commendation	Architectus and Schmidt Hammer Lassen Architects	State Library Victoria Redevelopment	Swanston Street	Victoria	Cultural	Melbourne Prize, 2020 (Vic); Award for Public Architecture, 2020 (Vic); Award for Heritage Architecture, Conservation, 2020 (Vic)
2021	National Award	Cox Architecture with Neeson Murcutt and Neille	Australian Museum Project Discover	College Street, Sydney	New South Wales	Cultural	NSW Architecture Medallion, 2021; Greenway Award for Heritage, 2021 (NSW); John Verge Award for Interior Architecture, 2021 (NSW)
2021	National Award	Andrew Burges Architect and Grimshaw with TCL in collaboration with the City of Sydney	Gunyama Park Aquatic and Recreation Centre	Green Square	New South Wales	Sport	Award for Public Architecture, 2021 (NSW); Lord Mayor's Prize, 2021 (NSW) Joint Winner
2022	National Award	Brearley Architects and Urbanists and Grant Amon Architects	Victorian Pride Centre	79/81 Fitzroy Street, St Kilda	Victoria	Cultural	William Wardell Award for Public Architecture, 2022 (VIC)
2022	National Award	Kerry Hill Architects	Walyalup Civic Centre	151 High Street, Fremantle	Western Australia	Cultural	George Temple Poole Award, 2022 (WA); Jeffrey Howlett Award for Public Architecture, 2022 (WA); Julius Elischer Award for Interior Architecture, 2022 (WA); John Septimus Roe Award for Urban Design, 2022 (WA); Sustainable Architecture commendation, 2022 (WA)
2022	National Award	Tonkin Zulaikha Greer Architects	Walsh Bay Arts Precinct	Walsh Bay, Millers Point, Sydney	New South Wales	Cultural	Award for Public Architecture, 2022 (NSW)
2022	National Commendation	Eoghan Lewis Architects	Kings Langley Cricket Club and Amenities	Pearce Reserve, Kings Langley, Sydney	New South Wales	Sport	Award for Public Architecture, 2022 (NSW)
2022	National Commendation	Vokes and Peters with Zuzana and Nicholas	New Farm Neighbourhood Centre	New Farm, Brisbane	Queensland	Cultural	Public Architecture Award, 2022 (Qld)
2023	National Award	SANAA and Architectus (executive architects)	Art Gallery of New South Wales, Sydney Modern building	Art Gallery Road, Sydney	New South Wales	Cultural	Sir John Sulman Medal, 2023 (NSW)
2023	National Award	Kerstin Thompson Architects	Melbourne Holocaust Museum	13 Selwyn Street, Elsternwick, Melbourne	Victoria	Cultural	Award for Public Architecture, 2013 (Vic)
2023	National Commendation	Wardle	Bendigo Law Courts	188 Hargreaves Street, Bendigo	Victoria	Cultural	William Wardell Award for Public Architecture, 2023 (Vic)
2023	National Commendation	Cumulus Studio	Dove Lake Viewing Shelter	Dove Lake	Tasmania	Cultural	Award for Public Architecture, 2023 (Tas); EmAGN Project Award, 2023 (Tas)
2024	National Award	Jackson Clements Burrows Architects	Berninneit Cultural and Community Centre	91—97 Thompson Avenue, Cowes	Victoria	Cultural	William Wardell Award for Public Architecture, 2024
2024	National Award	Grimshaw and Andrew Burges Architects with McGregor Coxall	Parramatta Aquatic Centre	7A Park Parade, Parramatta	New South Wales	Sport	Sir John Sulman Medal, 2024
2024	National Award	Officer Woods Architects	Spinifex Hill Project Space	18 Hedditch Street, South Hedland	Western Australia	Cultural	Award for Public Architecture (WA); Colorbond Award for Steel Architecture (WA); Brian Kidd Enabling Architecture Prize (WA)
2024	National Commendation	Adriano Pupilli Architects	Long Reef Surf Life Saving Club	Pittwater Road, Collaroy	New South Wales	Sport	Public Architecture Award, 2024 (NSW); Sustainable Architecture Award, 2024 (NSW)
2025	National Award	Kerstin Thompson Architects	Eva and Marc Besen Centre	TarraWarra Museum of Art, Healesville	Victoria	Cultural	William Wardell Award for Public Architecture, 2025; Award for Interior Architecture, 2025 (Vic)
2025	National Award	Jasmax (Canvas Projects)	Truganina Community Centre	1 Everton Road, Truganina	Victoria	Cultural	Public Architecture Award, 2025 (Vic)
2025	National Commendation	Archer Office	Allan Border Oval Pavilion	Myagah Road, Mosman	New South Wales	Sport	Public Architecture Award, 2025 (NSW)
2025	National Commendation	Lyons	Paula Fox Melanoma and Cancer Centre	545 St Kilda Road, Melbourne	Victoria	Health	Public Architecture Award, 2025 (Vic)
2026	National Award	Woods Bagot in collaboration with John McAslan and Partners	Central Station Redevelopment (2018—2024)	Central Station, Sydney	New South Wales	Transport	Sir John Sulman Medal, 2026; NSW Architecture Medallion, 2026
2026	National Award	Cox Architecture and Billard Leece Partnership	New Footscray Hospital	89 Ballarat Road, Footscray	Victoria	Health	William Wardell Award for Public Architecture, 2026 (Vic); Urban Design Commendation, 2026 (Vic)
2026	National Commendation	Besley and Spresser	Pier Pavilion	3 Barangaroo Avenue, Barangaroo, Sydney	New South Wales	Cultural	Public Architecture Award, 2026 (NSW)

== See also ==
- Australian Institute of Architects
- Australian Institute of Architects Awards and Prizes
- William Wardell Award for Public Architecture
- Sir John Sulman Medal for Public Architecture
- Victorian Architecture Medal
- Melbourne Prize
