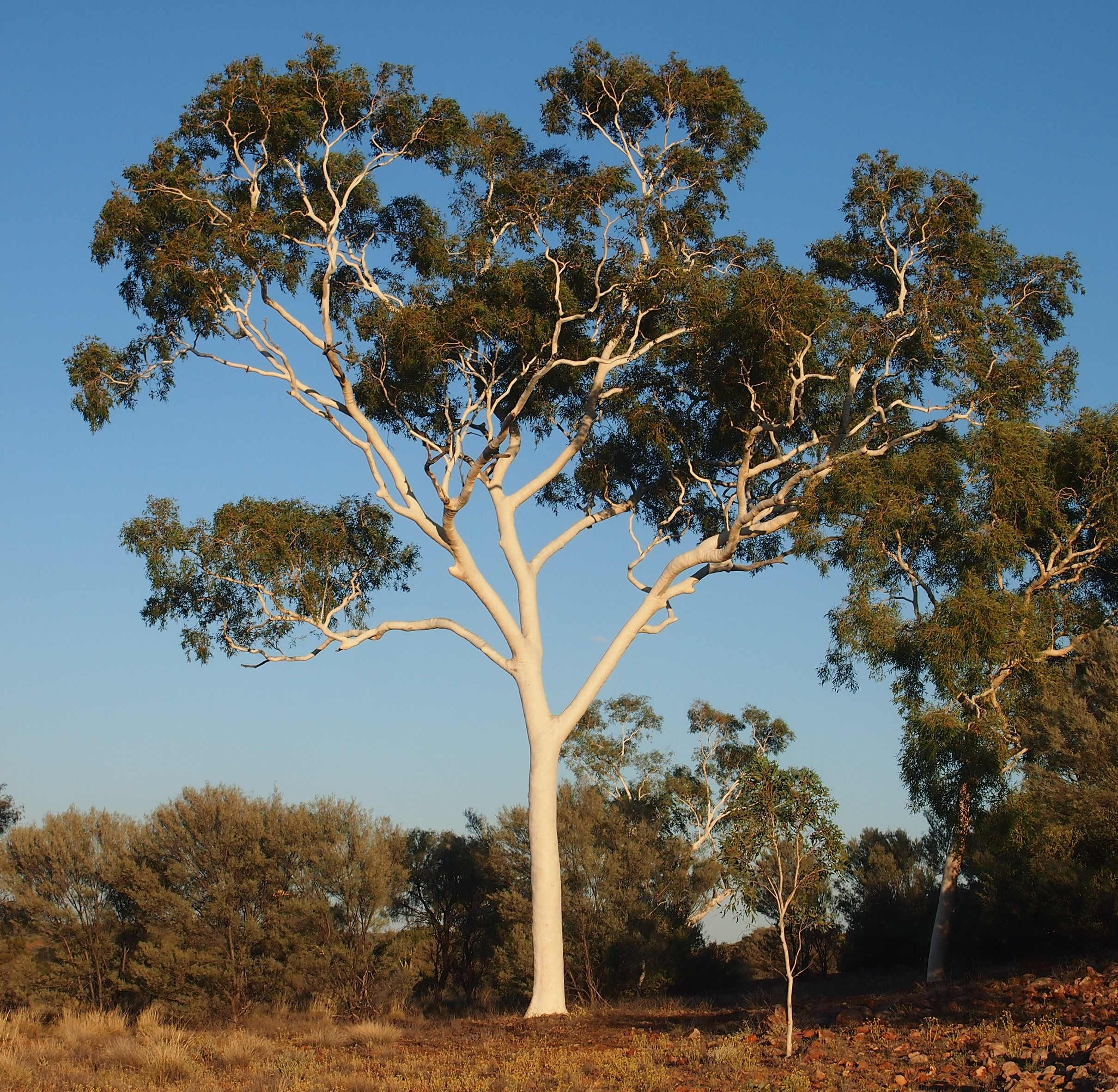

Conservation status
- Least Concern (IUCN 3.1)

Scientific classification
- Kingdom: Plantae
- Clade: Tracheophytes
- Clade: Angiosperms
- Clade: Eudicots
- Clade: Rosids
- Order: Myrtales
- Family: Myrtaceae
- Genus: Corymbia
- Species: C. aparrerinja

Binomial name
- Corymbia aparrerinja K.D.Hill & L.A.S.Johnson

Synonyms
- Corymbia punkapitiensis K.D.Hill & L.A.S.Johnson; Eucalyptus aparrerinja (K.D.Hill & L.A.S.Johnson) Brooker; Eucalyptus papuana var. aparrerinja Blakely nom. inval.

= Corymbia aparrerinja =

Species of plant

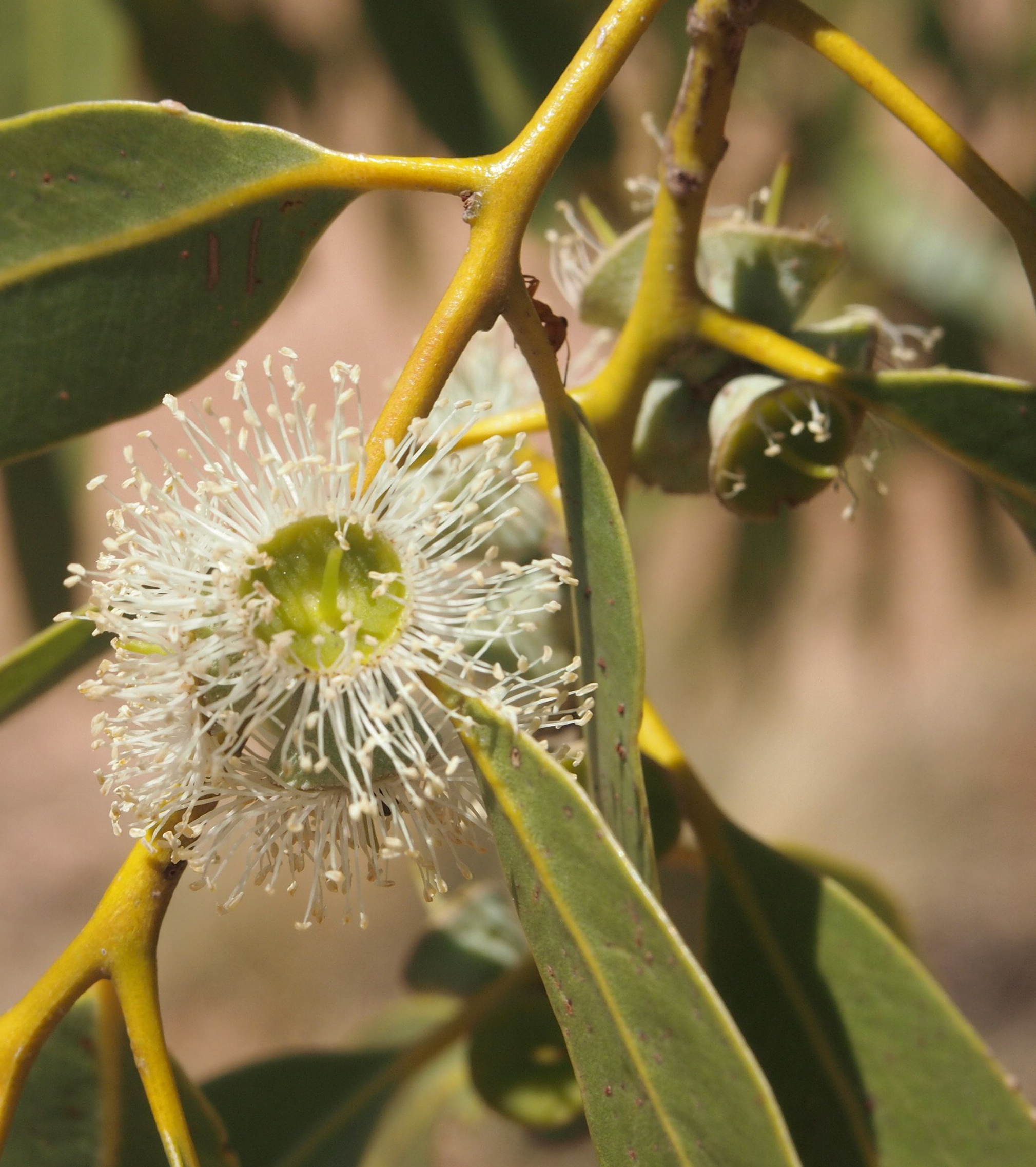
Flower

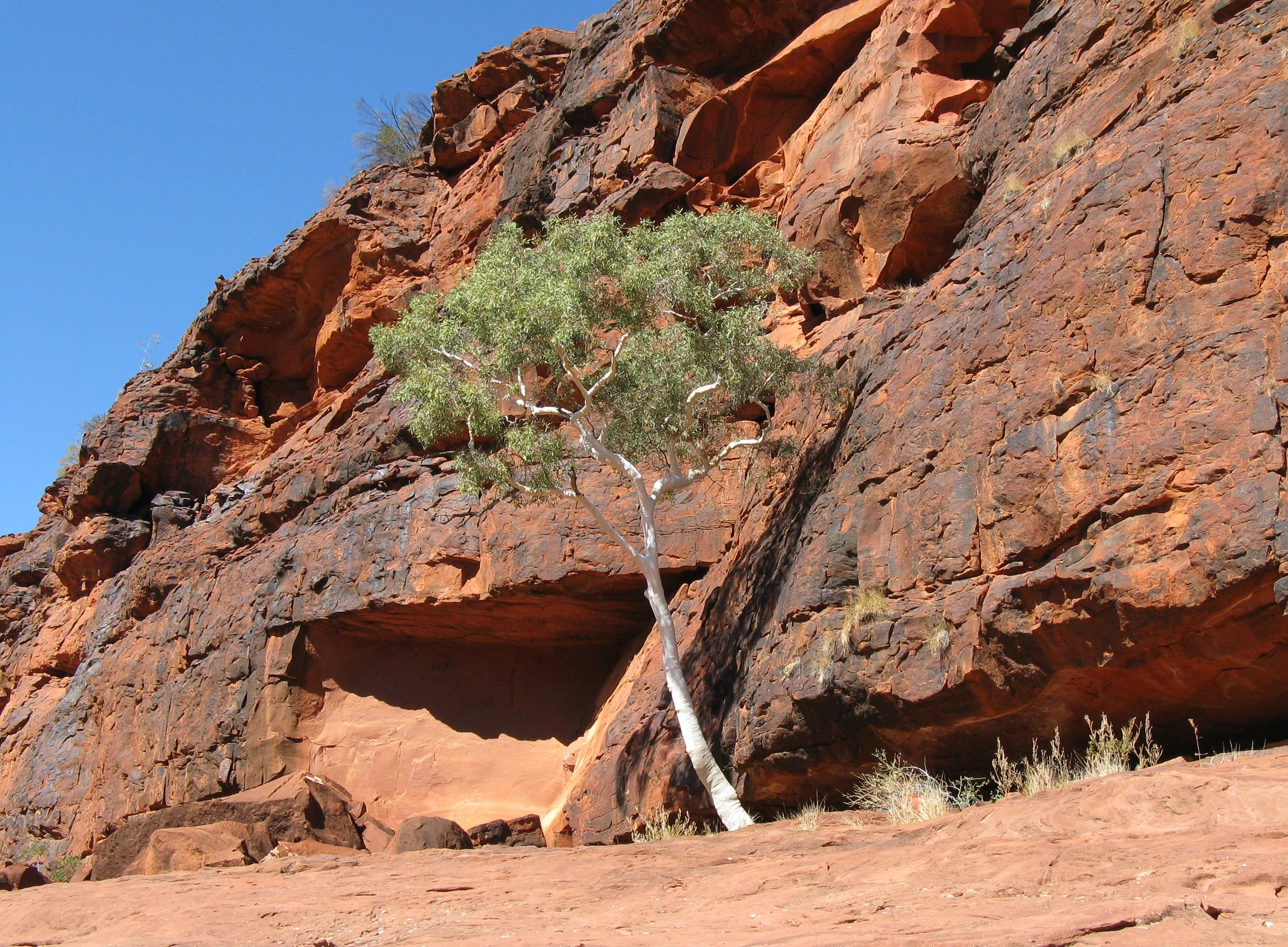
Ghost gum in Palm Valley

Corymbia aparrerinja, commonly known as ghost gum, is a species of tree that is endemic to Central Australia. It has smooth bark, lance-shaped or curved adult leaves, flower buds in groups of three or seven, white flowers and cup-shaped to cylindrical fruit.

== Description ==
Corymbia aparrerinja is a tree that typically grows to a height of 20 m (66 ft), often much less, and forms a lignotuber. It has smooth, sometimes powdery, white to cream-coloured and pinkish bark that is shed in thin patches. Young plants and coppice regrowth have egg-shaped leaves that are 50–155 mm (2.0–6.1 in) long, 20–65 mm (0.8–2.6 in) wide and arranged in opposite pairs. Adult leaves are arranged alternately, the same shade of glossy green on both sides, lance-shaped or curved, 50–165 mm (2.0–6.5 in) long and 7–32 mm (0.3–1.3 in) wide tapering to a petiole 5–20 mm (0.2–0.8 in) long. The flower buds are arranged on the ends of branchlets on a branched peduncle 5–38 mm (0.2–1.5 in) long, each branch with groups of three or seven buds, the individual buds on pedicels 2–5 mm (0.08–0.20 in) long. Mature buds are oval to pear-shaped, 6–7 mm (0.24–0.28 in) long and 5–6 mm (0.20–0.24 in) wide with a rounded operculum. Flowering occurs in summer and the flowers are white. The fruit is a woody cup-shaped to more or less cylindrical capsule 9–13 mm (0.35–0.51 in) long and 7–9 mm (0.28–0.35 in) wide with the valves near rim level or enclosed.

== Taxonomy and naming ==
Corymbia aparrerinja was first formally described in 1995 by Ken Hill and Lawrie Johnson from specimens collected on Gosses Bluff by Herbert Basedow in 1925. The same specimens were used by William Blakely to describe (in English), Eucalyptus papuana F.Muell. var. aparrerinja, but did not provide a Latin diagnosis ('description'), so the name was not validly published.

== Distribution and habitat ==
Ghost gum occurs in arid areas of Central Australia on rocky slopes, red sand flats and dry creek beds. It is found from near Giles in Western Australia, through the south of the Northern Territory as far north as Tennant Creek to near Mount Isa and Barcaldine in Queensland.

== Uses ==
Parts of this tree were used by Indigenous Australians to treat colds.

== Culture ==
In 1891 in Barcaldine, a ghost gum known as the Tree of Knowledge was the focal point of a gathering of striking sheep shearers, a key event leading to the formation of the Australian Labor Party.

This species of tree features in aboriginal Dreamtime stories and gained prominence with the wider public in the 20th century through the paintings of aboriginal artist Albert Namatjira.

== See also ==
- List of Corymbia species
