= Design Institute of Australia =

Australian design organization

- Abbreviation: DIA
- Formation: 1947
- Founded at: Melbourne, Australia
- Type: Australian Public Company
- Location: 27 Derby Street, Collingwood VIC 3066, Australia
- National President: Claire Beale
- CEO: Jo-Ann Kellock
- Website: www.dia.org.au
- Formerly called: Society of Designers for Industry, Industrial Design Institute of Australia

The Design Institute of Australia (DIA) is an Australian organisation that represents designers in Australia. The DIA acts as a professional body representing all disciplines of design, and undertakes work such as the promotion of ethical standards for the design industry, as well as promoting co-operation between individual designers.

== History ==
The organisation was founded as the Society of Designers for Industry in 1947, and first incorporated as the Industrial Design Institute of Australia on 15 August 1958, with chapters in Victoria, New South Wales and South Australia. The institute joined the ICSID in 1967. They joined International Council of Design in 1980 and then, on 20 December 1982, the organisation was again renamed to the Design Institute of Australia, as it is today. On 1 July 1998, the organisation merged with the Society of Interior Designers of Australia, and the Australian Textile Design Association; becoming a National rather than Federal body.

== See also ==
- World Design Organization
