= Tree of Knowledge (Australia) =

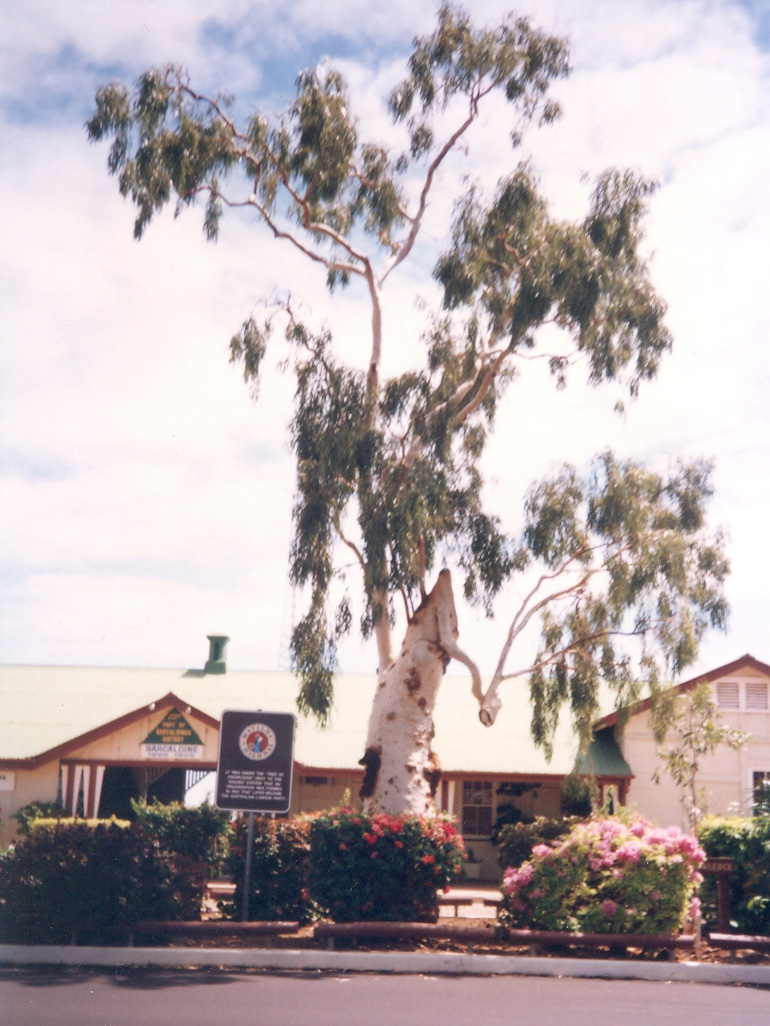
- The Tree of Knowledge, Barcaldine, 1997

- Location within Queensland
- 23.5523°S 145.2897°E
- Location: Oak Street, Barcaldine, Barcaldine Region, Queensland, Australia

History
- Design period: 1870s–1890s (late 19th century)
- Built: 1891–1891

Queensland Heritage Register
- Official name: Tree of Knowledge
- Type: state heritage (landscape)
- Designated: 21 October 1992
- Reference no.: 600021
- Significant period: 1891 (historical)
- Significant components: memorial – plaque, flagpole/flagstaff, memorial/monument

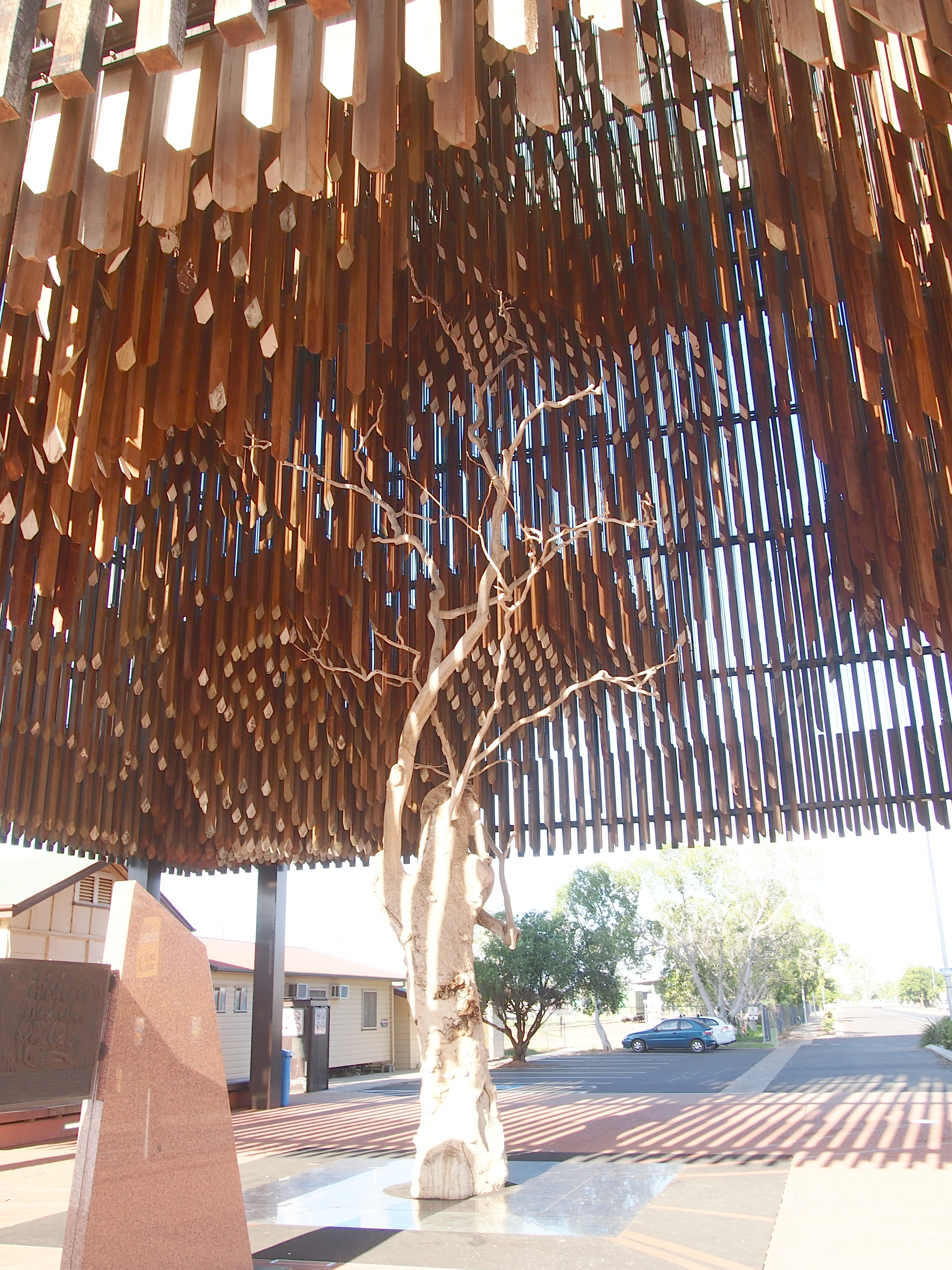
The preserved trunk of Tree of Knowledge as it currently stands in Barcaldine, Queensland.

The Tree of Knowledge was a heritage-listed tree in Oak Street, Barcaldine, Barcaldine Region, Queensland, Australia, that was poisoned and killed in 2006. It was a 200-year-old Corymbia aparrerinja ghost gum. It was added to the Queensland Heritage Register on 21 October 1992.

The town was the headquarters of the 1891 Australian shearers' strike and the tree was the site of the 1892 reading of the Labour Party manifesto leading to the formation of the Australian Labor Party (ALP).

== History ==
The Tree of Knowledge was a ghost gum located in front of the Barcaldine railway station under which the workers of the 1891 Shearer's Strike met. An icon of the Labor Party and Trades Unions, it symbolises the foundation of the organised representation of labour in Queensland.

Barcaldine sprang up in 1886 as the terminus of the Central Western railway. The area was already settled by pastoralists and had previously been centred on Blackall. Large sheep stations were like small townships with their own working facilities, stores, worker's accommodation and tradesmen such as blacksmiths. The owners and managers of these stations had considerable power to dictate terms to an itinerant workforce of sheep shearers recruited for the shearing season. Poor working conditions, low pay and the threat of competition from cheap foreign labour caused discontent within the industry.

Barcaldine was a natural focus for the development of unionism. As the railhead, the town drew many seasonal and casual workers. Besides shearers and hands there were navvies who had worked on the construction of the railway and carriers who had found their work reduced by it. Difficulties in finding work and financial hardship helped to build a sense of mateship and mutual support amongst sections of them. In 1887, the Central Queensland Carriers Union was formed, and discussions leading up to this are said to have been held under the gum tree which provided shade where carriers waited at the front of the railway station. At the same time, the Queensland Shearers' Union was formed at Blackall. Within a year, it had 1,300 members, indicating a perceived need for collective bargaining to obtain fair pay and working conditions. In 1888, the Central Queensland Labourers' Union was formed at Barcaldine. These three unions were the driving force behind the strike of 1891.

In Brisbane, the Trades and Labour Council was formed in 1885 and in 1889 became the Australian Labour Federation. At Barcaldine in the same year the Pastoral Employers' Association was founded in response and moved to reduce pay rates. Many workers now joined the unions, pushing membership of the Shearers Union over 3000 and the Labourer's Union to 2,250. Only severe wet weather in 1890 delayed a confrontation. By January 1891 union representatives had gathered at Barcaldine for meetings and pastoralists were pressing shearers to sign freedom of contract forms. A strike was called and employers began to import non-union labour from the south. Strikers, some of whom were armed, gathered at Barcaldine and set up a camp at Lagoon Creek and other places around the town.

The Queensland Government dispatched police and soldiers to the area and the strikers responded by drilling and staging torchlight processions in the town. As the non-union labour, police, and soldiers usually arrived by rail, strikers would rally outside the railway station to block their arrival and protest. Consequently, the tree in front of the station, the Tree of Knowledge, was the location of many meetings and a focus for protest. In March 1891, the situation escalated as carriers and railway workers went out in sympathy and military reinforcements arrived. Barcaldine became the focus of the whole country's interest and armed conflict was expected. However, heavy rain which limited movement and the arrest of leaders slowed momentum and strikers began to disperse. On 15 June, the strike was officially called off. It had failed, but was to have far-reaching effects. In 1892, at the foot of the tree, the Manifesto of the Queensland Labour Party dated 9 September 1892 was read out, leading to the formation of the Labor Party in Queensland. The manifesto is considered one of the foundation documents of the current Australian Labor Party and is now held by the State Library of Queensland. In 2008, the manifesto was added to UNESCO's Memory of the World Australian Register and in 2009, the document was added to UNESCO's Memory of the World International Register.

Because the area beneath the Tree of Knowledge was the scene of actions and decisions which had a profound effect on the future of labour and politics in Australia, it has become an icon of the Labor Party and Trades Unions. It is also important to the people of Barcaldine as a symbol of the town's identity and historical importance. This is reflected by the name chosen for the commemoration committee formed in 1987, the Tree of Knowledge Development Committee, and by the care given to the tree. In 1990, it was discovered that the tree was infested by termites and other insects and had severe health problems. Treatment by a tree surgeon, pest control and flushing of the root system with thousands of litres of water gave the tree a new lease of life. This treatment was completed in late 1993.

In 1991, there were major celebrations at Barcaldine to mark the centenary of the Shearers' Strike. In preparation for this, the area around the tree was landscaped and a memorial to the strikers erected within the enclosure.

In 2006, the tree was poisoned with glyphosate (a main ingredient in the herbicide RoundUp). An arborist declared the tree dead on 3 October 2006. The ALP offered a reward of A$10,000 for any information that would help identify those responsible. The remains of the tree were removed on 29 July 2007. According to a Queensland Government release, the tree's wood underwent preservation with the remains of the tree – 7 metres (23 ft) tall and 2 metres (6 ft 7 in) across – being transferred to a special preservation facility.

Several cuttings propagated from the tree before its death are now growing in Barcaldine. In 2008, the tree was successfully cloned in by workers at the former Queensland Department of Primary Industries. A clone of the tree has also been planted at the Ecosciences Precinct in Brisbane.

A new memorial on the site of the remains of the original tree (costing about A$5M) was officially opened on 2 May 2009. The memorial designed by Brian Hooper Architect & m3architecture (architects in association), won The Lachlan Macquarie Award for Heritage Architecture and a National Commendation for Public Architecture at the 2010 National Architecture Awards of the Australian Institute of Architects.

In 2009, as part of the Q150 celebrations, the Tree of Knowledge was also announced as one of the Q150 Icons of Queensland for its role as a "location".

On 19 April 2011 Prime Minister Julia Gillard joined ACT Chief Minister Jon Stanhope at the National Arboretum Canberra in a ceremonial planting of a tree grown from an original cutting of the Tree of Knowledge.

== Description ==
The Tree of Knowledge is a ghost gum (Corymbia aparrerinja) situated outside the railway station in the main street of Barcaldine. Early photographs show a wider canopy than existed at the time of the tree's demise. At the foot of the tree is a plaque which says:

This plaque commemorates the loyalty, courage, and sacrifice in 1891 of the stalwart men and women of the west from whom, beneath this tree, emerged Australia's labour and political movement.

The Tree of Knowledge is protected by a modern metal fence and the area surrounding it is bordered by a low rail composed of evenly spaced lengths of log and is landscaped with flowering shrubs. This area also contains a flagpole and a bronze and granite monument symbolising shear blades which was erected in 1991 to commemorate the centenary of the Shearer's Strike.

== Heritage listing ==
Tree of Knowledge was listed on the Queensland Heritage Register on 21 October 1992 having satisfied the following criteria.

The place is important in demonstrating the evolution or pattern of Queensland's history.

The Tree of Knowledge was a key site during the Shearer's Strike in 1891, a confrontation between capital and labour that was a major event in Queensland's history. The strike was a watershed in the development of the labour movement and the formation of the Australian Labor Party.

The place has a strong or special association with a particular community or cultural group for social, cultural or spiritual reasons.

The Tree of Knowledge is closely linked with the cultural identity of Barcaldine and has a strong association with its people.

The place has a special association with the life or work of a particular person, group or organisation of importance in Queensland's history.

The Tree of Knowledge has a special association with the history of the Australian Labor Party and with the Trades Union movement in Queensland.

== See also ==
- List of individual trees
- List of named Eucalyptus trees
