= African design =

African design encompasses many forms of expression and refers to the forms of design from the continent of Africa and the African diaspora including urban design, architectural design, interior design, product design, art, and fashion design. Africa's many diverse countries are sources of vibrant design with African design influences visible in historical and contemporary art and culture around the world. The study of African design is still limited, particularly from the viewpoint of Africans, and the opportunity to expand its current definition by exploring African visual representations and introducing contemporary design applications remains immense.

== Key characteristics ==
Like all forms of design, African design is defined by its creativity and continuous evolution. Design is a form of story-telling and it is a medium through which those stories are told. In 2009, Chimamanda Ngozi Adichie spoke on "The Danger of a Single Story" which has become one of the top ten most-viewed TED Talks of all time. For years African design has been stereotyped, represented by ethnic prints and earthy colors and textures. Yet with 54 countries and an estimated total of over 1.2 billion people in Africa as of 2018, in addition to 210 million people across the African diaspora (Brazil, the Caribbean, and the United States), African design is not limited to a single aesthetic or singular history; rather it is multifaceted and influenced its local and global context, both historical and present-day, in which the designer or consumer lives.

African design is rooted in rich heritage, techniques, and craftsmanship. As contemporary African designers move on from externally imposed definitions of the colonial era, they acknowledge African traditional craft and craftsmanship is where they draw inspiration: preserving the past by putting a focus on their heritage and traditions while remaining open to global influences and technology. An example is the architecture of the Kenyan National Library, which was inspired by the Djembe drum.

Across Africa, sustainable design focusing on social responsibility and the environment is important and the use of locally sourced natural materials has always been part of the African design process. As stated by Professor Mugendi K M'Rithaa "It is about design for, and with, society".

== History of African design ==
The generation of wealth in African societies facilitated their development of design. For centuries, African kingdoms generated wealth from trading natural resources with other Africans and later Arabs and Europeans. The Asante Empire’s dominance over the gold trade has been documented. Similarly, rich agricultural societies of Central Africa and Southern Africa exchanged goods with the Portuguese since the 16th century. This wealth spurred local design and creativity across architecture, art, textiles, and other design forms. Examples include the 11th century Great Zimbabwe and the other 200 mortarless wall cities throughout Southern Africa as well as the Benin Bronzes created from the 13th century in the Benin Empire (present-day Nigeria). Textile weaving also flourished due to patronage by kings, chiefs, and other royals and aristocrats for ceremonial occasions such as birth, marriage, and funerals. In Nigeria, the ancient city of Kano was known for its highly developed textile industry and indigo dyeing-pits. In Central Africa, the Bamileke bought beads to decorate thrones and ceremonial clothing thereby enhancing their importance. External influences, particularly religion, also impacted design across Africa. Religion's requirements for modesty encouraged the adoption of clothing. The arrival of Islam in the 11th century in West Africa and later Christianity in the 1450s in Cape Verde which spread along the West African coast and then inland stimulated local production of stripwoven cloths as well as demand for imported fabrics. In East Africa, cotton was introduced by Arabs in Ethiopia which spurred cotton-growing and weaving industries to turn cotton into textiles.

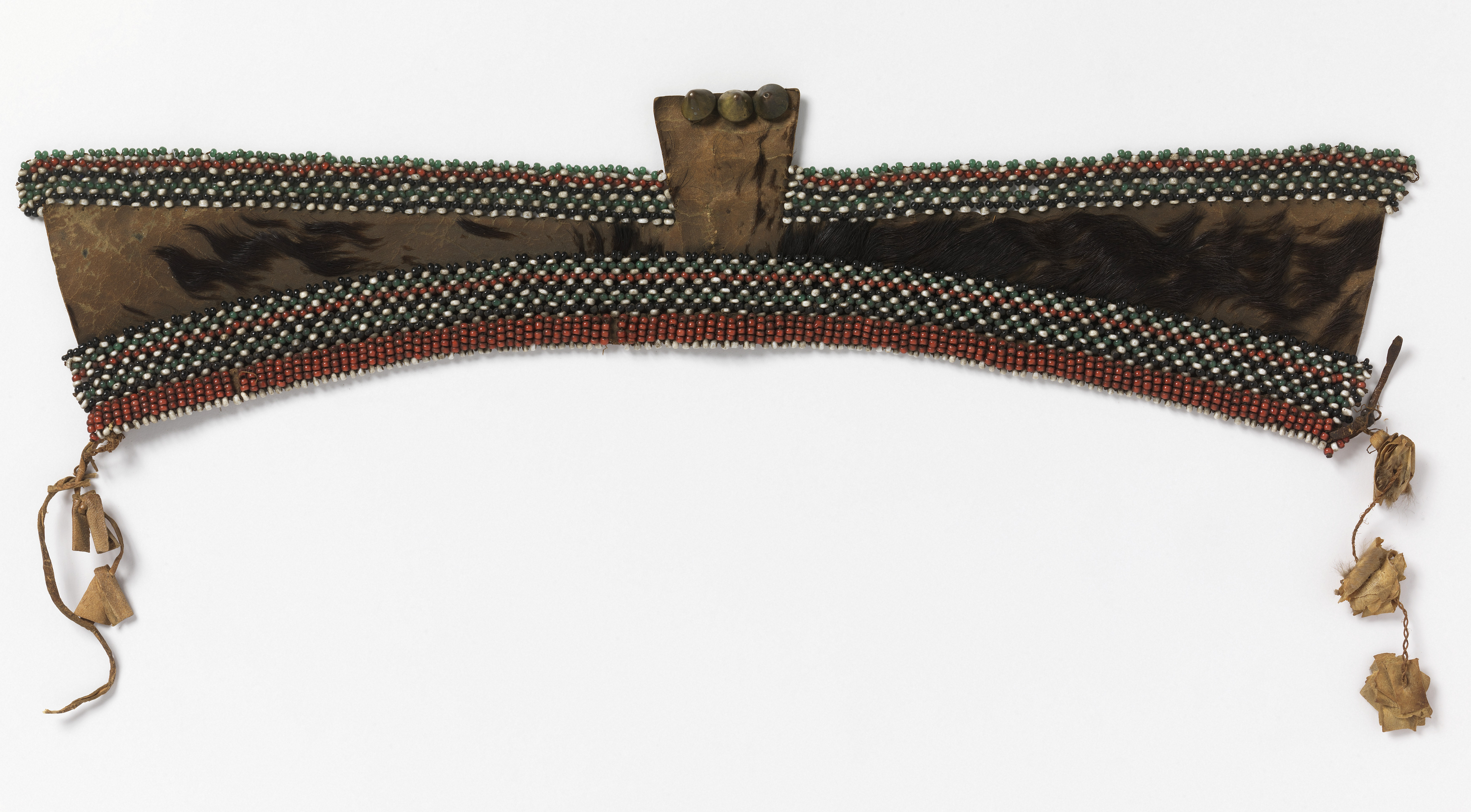
Headpiece (South Africa), 1870s (CH 18471617)

=== Textiles ===
Historically, textiles were used as a form of money in West Africa and Central Africa. There are records of cloth being used as money since the fourteenth century. Pieces were made identical in size, efficiently carried, and exchanged in quantities based on the value of the item or trade.

Across Africa, there are many distinct local styles of textiles. Wealthy individuals and traders required different types of locally-woven and imported cloth to enhance their prestige, driving demand. The Kuba in Cameroon and Congo has one of the widest range of textile skills in Africa including weaving cloth from leaves of raphia palm as well as embroidery, appliqué, cut-pile, and resist dyeing techniques.

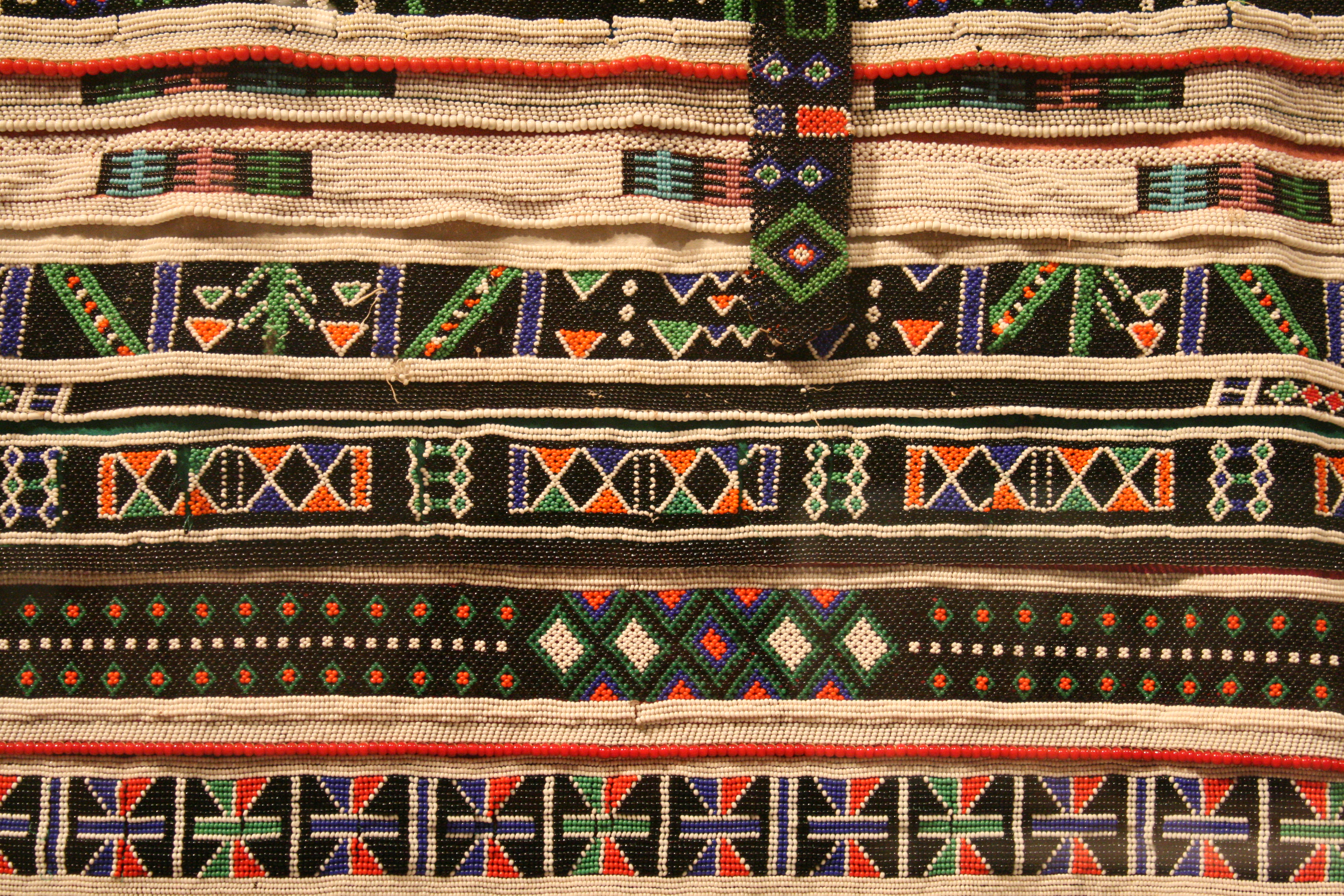
African Textile Design Pattern

=== Metalwork and goldsmithing ===
Further information: Ghana Akan goldweights, Benin Bronzes

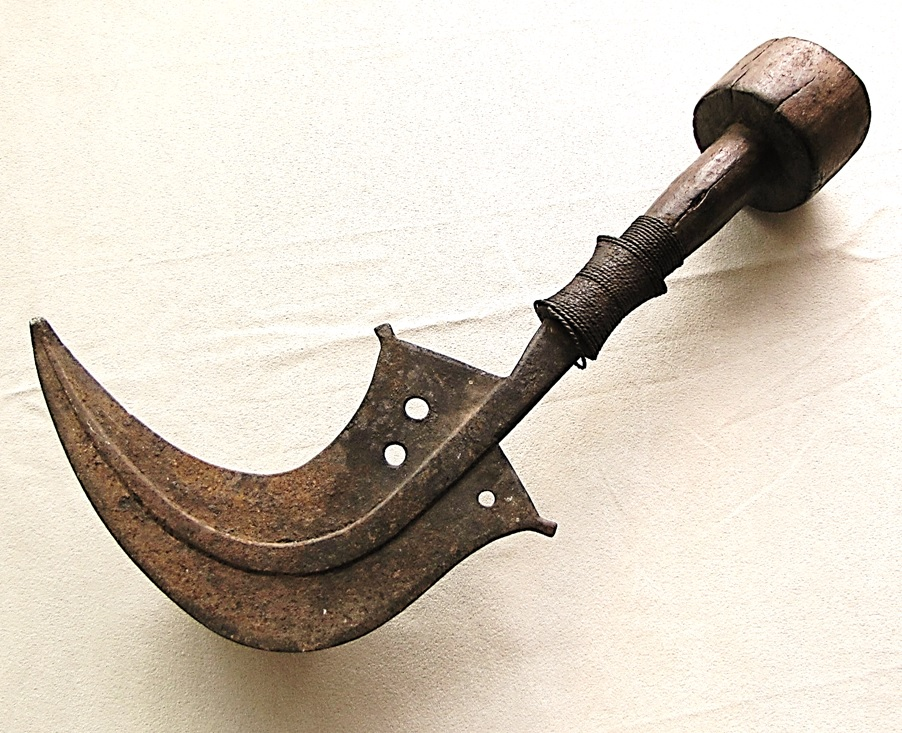
African Trumbash – Mangbetu curved knife

=== Art ===
Further information Prehistoric African Art, African Art thematic elements, history and influence, Museum of Black Civilisations

=== Architecture ===
Further information: Architecture of Africa, Moroccan Architecture

=== Influence on global design ===
Further information: African Art in Western Collections

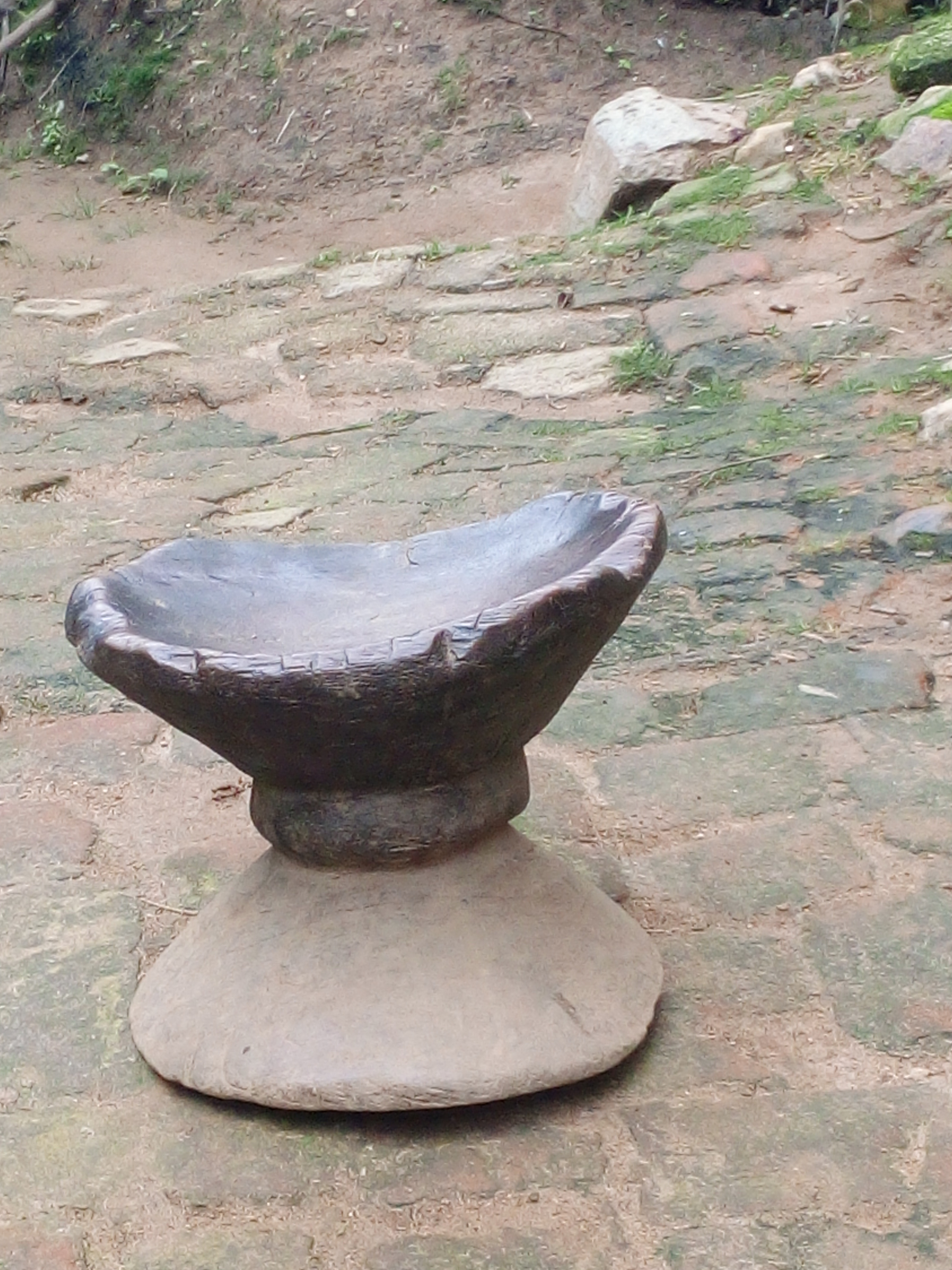
Traditional chair from Rwanda

== Contemporary African Design ==
Design is playing an important role as African designers move on from externally imposed definitions of the colonial era and redefine African design on their own terms. African designers acknowledge traditional craft and craftsmanship in contemporary designs. This places a focus on their heritage and traditions while remaining open to global influences and technology, and creates contemporary designs that take into account social sustainability and environmental sustainability needs of each region.

=== Institutions ===
There are several institutions that showcase and support the study of African design, with an increasing focus on the perspective of Africans and the African diaspora.

- Dakar Biennale: Conceived as a celebration of African literature, craft, and visual arts in 1989, the Biennale has focused on contemporary African art and design since 1996. Based in Dakar, Senegal, the exhibition takes place every two years and has evolved into one of the largest shows comprising African design.
- Design Indaba: Founded in 1995, Design Indaba is an annual design conference in Cape Town, South Africa. As the Southern Hemisphere's biggest creative conference, its goal is to enable a better world through creativity. The conference curates speakers from all the creative sectors including graphic design, advertising, film, music, fashion design, industrial design, architecture, visual art, new media, publishing, broadcasting, and performing arts. At the 2019 conference, ÖVERALLT, a high-profile collaboration between Swedish furniture brand IKEA and 10 African artists including from five countries, was unveiled. The designers included Selly Raby Kane, Issa Diabaté, Laduma Ngxokolo founder of Maxhosa, and Sindiso Khumalo. This limited-edition collection of African-inspired tableware, furniture, and textiles has been available for purchase across all IKEA markets since May 2019
- Design Week Lagos: Annuel design festival founded in 2019 by designer Titi Ogufere.
- Museum of African Design: Based in the Maboneng Precinct in Johannesburg, this is Africa's first museum dedicated to design. The museum is not a collecting museum and therefore does not have permanent collections. It is a space that, through collaboration with partner institutions, explores the evolving African continent and the African diaspora through exhibitions, installations, and showcase events. The museum officially opened in October 2013.
- Black Artists & Designers Guild (BADG): Founded in 2018 by Malene Barnett, an artist based in Brooklyn, New York, to address the lack of representation of Black talent and culture in the design industry. Barnett describes it as "a curated collective of black artists and designers throughout the African diaspora."
- 54kibo: Brooklyn based distributor and proponent of African design founded by Nana Quagraine.

=== Art ===
Further information: Contemporary African Art, Contemporary African Art exhibitions, World Festival of Black Arts, Museum of Black Civilisations, The Zeitz Museum of Contemporary Art and Art X Lagos

Further information: African American Art, Influence of African Art on Western Art and General concept of Art, Metropolitan Museum of Art: Before Yesterday We Could Fly

=== Architectural design ===
Further information: Architecture of Africa, David Adjaye, Architect Africa Film Festival, Moroccan Architecture

=== Furniture ===
Leading contemporary African furniture designers include Bibi Seck, co-founder of Birsel + Seck and Malian designer Cheick Diallo, whose MO armchair, made using a combination of fishing wire stretched over a metal frame, is inspired by traditional traps used by Malian fishermen. The chair has been highly regarded as a perfect mixture of material, ergonomics, and local aesthetic in an elegant, somewhat sculptural furniture piece. The designs of Jomo Tariku, an Ethiopian American artist and industrial designer who draws on his experiences of African design and various African cultures in Kenya and Ethiopia, has been featured at the 2017 International Contemporary Furniture Fair (ICFF) and well-recognized design magazines including Architectural Digest, Elle Decor and Dwell. Ini Archibong, an American-born artist and designer of Nigerian heritage, has designed furniture for Bernhard Design, Sé, and Knoll. Works by both Tariku and Archibong are included in the Afrofuturist Period Room at the Metropolitan Museum of Art (MET) in New York. Nigerian Jean Servais Somian, who spends his time between Africa and Europe teaching classes, infuses his creations with elements of ancestrality, reflected in his choice of materials (coconut wood, ebony, or acacia) and revisited objects of everyday African life like basins, sponges, or old fishermen's canoes. Yinka Ilori, based in London, fuses together his British and Nigerian heritage to tell new stories in contemporary design. His work draws inspiration from traditional Nigerian parables and West African fabrics that surrounded him as a child. South Africa-based design company Dokter & Misses develop interior solutions for private and corporate clients as well as educational institutions all over the world, including MTV, Nike, and the University of Johannesburg, and continue to support and promote South African design.

Paying homage to his cultural ties, Hamed Ouattara's designs highlight Burkina Faso's artisanal metal-working heritage and address a modern global audience, including international galleries and important collectors, through African innovation. Recently deceased in April 2015 while preparing for his show in London, Babacar M'Bodj Niang, founder of Nulangee Studio in Senegal, sculpted furniture out of local, discarded wood that was sourced by the community kids and adults he employed.

Tekura Designs' djembe side table, sustainably made from wood offcuts in Ghana's forests, draws inspiration from the West African djembe drum. Nigerian architect and designer Tosin Oshinowo’s furniture brand Ilé Ilà produces furniture inspired by Yoruba culture.

Emerging designers include South African's Candice Lawrence, inspired by the textures, people, and environment where she lives, has remodeled Ndebele necklaces into handcrafted lighting pendants that have been featured in Forbes, Vogue Italia, and Top Billing South Africa. Sifiso Shange was recognized in 2019 for Best New Talent at the 100% Design South Africa showcase (one of Africa's leading exhibitions for contemporary design), for a design created in collaboration with established designer John Vogel whose signature chairs and furniture incorporate local materials and woven techniques.

=== Textiles ===
Multidisciplinary artist and textile designer Aboubakar Fofana is known for his work with fermented indigo vat dyeing and mineral mud-dye techniques and is known for preserving traditional natural indigo dyeing practices in Mali. based in Bamako, utilizes the hand-woven fabrics and travels globally to lead workshops on indigo dyeing techniques.

Senegalese textile designer Aissa Dione creates luxurious fabrics using locally grown cotton and Senegal's ancient, ancestral know-how. With a customer base including global brands Hermès, Fendi, Christian Liaigre, and Peter Marino, Aïssa serves the highest-end interior design brands. Her designs and fabrics grace major design salons, from Paris to Johannesburg and New York. In 2019, Aissa Dione designed the interiors at Kehinde Wiley's Black Rock artists’ residence in Dakar (the buildings were designed by Senegalese architect Abib Djenne). Other established textile designers include Nigerian Eva Sonaike, Haitian brand Yael et Valerie; Conakry, Guinea-based Tensira; Ethiopian textile designer Sabahar; and Egyptian rug maker Kilim, practicing traditional hand-weaving techniques.

=== Basket weaving and beadwork ===
With key hubs in Southern Africa, East Africa, and West Africa, designers and artisans weave eco-friendly functional and decorative baskets using available and sustainable natural fibers like sisal grass in Eswatini and raffia in Ghana. Some examples of leading designers include Zenzulu basket designs which are handmade and fairly traded, ensuring sustainable incomes for more than 350 artisans in South Africa. Zenzulu has been awarded the Elle Decoration International Design Award in 2002. The designs have been showcased in Design Made in Africa. Established in 1985, producer Tintsaba is recognized as an industry leader, working with over 1000 Swazi artisans ,including 20 Master Weavers. Gone Rural is another, named by Travel & Leisure as one of three brands making waves in sustainable fashion and housewares. In Tanzania, Sidai Designs collaborates with Maasai weavers to merge their techniques with a modern aesthetic. Contemporary artists like AAKS maintain the traditional legacy of weaving using raffia to create modern handbags and lighting.

=== Modern music and clothing ===
Africa as a whole is made up of many different and diverse cultures and has inspired many different fashions and music styles. African imagery can be seen a lot in black communities and Afro communities throughout the world, for example, Europe and North America.

- Kerby Jean-Raymond a Haitian-American designer who works with fashion and form, the main focus being street fashion and street wear to create unique forms and shape. His brand name is Pyer Moss. The brand saw a growth spurt in 2015 caused by collaborating with sports.
- Yinka Shonibare is a British-Nigerian artist who works with sculptural forms. Influences of African design can be seen in the print style, pattern, and color of the fabrics chosen in each sculpture made. There is a Victorian era twist that takes place with leads to the commentary of colonization and colonialism that took place in Africa when world powers were expanding.
- Afro-Punk or Afro Punk Festival is a popular festival where afrocentric alternative fashion and culture is celebrated and first came to be in 2005. Afro beat is a popular music type played at the festival which takes great influence of West African music and American Jazz as well as Soul and Funk music. Many different elements from African diverse cultures take form in Afro punk music and clothing style, a big focus is on reclaiming the natural look of Afrocentric hairstyles and hair types which is looked down upon in Eurocentric beauty standers of then and today.
