= Government architect =

Government architect may refer to:

== Australia ==
- New South Wales Government Architect
- Northern Territory Government Architect
- Queensland Government Architect
- South Australia Government Architect
- Victorian Government Architect
- Western Australia Government Architect

== Elsewhere ==
- Chief Government Architect of the Netherlands
- Flemish Government Architect
- New Zealand Government Architect

== See also ==
- Chief architect (disambiguation)
- Colonial Architect (disambiguation)
- State architect
