= Andrea Nield =

Australian architect (born 1951)

- Born: 1951 (age 74–75); Hamburg, Germany
- Education: University of Sydney
- Occupation: Architect
- Awards: Australian Institute of Architects' Marion Mahony Griffin Prize for a Distinctive Body of Architecture Work; 2008
- Practice: Studio Nield, Sydney
- Buildings: Hilarie Mais Studio; Ultimo Community Centre, Sydney; St Vincent's Hospital, Sydney; Queen Mary Hospital, Hong Kong
- Projects: Women's and Children's Hospital, Afghanistan; Aceh Housing, Aceh, Indonesia; Ngari School, Solomon Islands

Andrea Nield (born 1951) is an Australian architect who founded and was elected the first president of Emergency Architects Australia. Nield has directed major relief and reconstruction work in Aceh, Indonesia, the Solomon Islands and Victoria, Australia after natural disasters. She and her husband Lawrence Nield are directors of Studio Nield – an Architecture and Urban Design practice.

Nield has designed hospitals in Afghanistan, Hong Kong and Australia and is a joint author of "Beyond Shelter – Architecture for Crisis" and "Beyond Shelter – Architecture and Human Dignity".

She was the Australian Institute of Architects (NT) Creative Director for AusIndoArch Tropfix Student Design Workshop held in June 2014 and the AusIndoArch Conference in Darwin November 2014, Australia.

== Education ==
Nield was educated at the University of Sydney where she received a BSc.Arch. in 1974 and BArch with Honors in 1977.

== Work ==
Nield founded Emergency Architects Australia (EAA) in 2005 which has responded to natural emergencies in Aceh, Indonesia, in Sri Lanka, the Solomon Islands, in Pakistan and in Australia. EAA is associated with the French emergency architecture agency Architectes de l'urgence Foundation.

In the Solomon Islands, Nield raised the funds and organised the team to rebuild Ngari School with the local community – a prototype school to be repeated in other locations by the Solomon Islands Department of Education.

Nield led the EAA team along with BVN Architecture that planned the Temporary Village in Kinglake, Victoria after the Black Saturday bushfires and initiated the rebuilding of the award-winning Narbethong Community Hall.

== Notable Projects ==
- Mais Studio/Gallery, Sydney Australia – 1998
- Balmain House, Sydney, Australia – 1992
- Women's and Children’s Hospital, Afghanistan – 2003
- Aceh Housing, Aceh, Indonesia – 2005
- Ngari School, Solomon Islands – 2006
- Ultimo Community Centre, Sydney, Australia – 1990
- St Vincent's Hospital, Sydney, Sydney, Australia – 1998
- Kai Tak Children's Hospital, Hong Kong – 2011
- Queen Mary Hospital, Hong Kong – 2013
- Kai Tak General Hospital, Hong Kong – 2014

== Publications ==
- Pyrmont/Ultimo Study
- Beyond Shelter – Architecture for Crisis (2011)
- Beyond Shelter – Architecture and Human Dignity (2012)
- New Kununurra courthouse

== Awards ==
- 2008 – Australian Institute of Architects' Marion Mahony Griffin Prize for a Distinctive Body of Architecture Work
