= Elizabeth Mojisola Hunponu-Wusu =

Nigerian investment banking professional

Founder and President, WoodHall Capital.

Personal details
- Born: November 10, 1977 (age 48)
- Citizenship: Nigeria
- Spouse: Married
- Education: Coventry University (Bachelor of Science in Economics)
- Occupation: Investment Banker

Elizabeth Mojisola Hunponu‑Wusu (born 10 November 1977) is a British-Nigerian investment banker and entrepreneur. She is the founder and President of Woodhall Capital, a financial advisory firm with operations in Lagos, London, Dubai, and Abuja. The company focuses on sourcing international capital for African governments, financial institutions, and corporations.

== Early life and education ==
Hunponu‑Wusu was born in Lagos, Nigeria. She began her education at Adesoye College in Kwara State before relocating to the United Kingdom at age 15 to attend Abbey College Malvern in Worcestershire. She earned a Bachelor of Science degree in Economics from Coventry University.

== Career ==
=== Early roles in investment banking ===
Hunponu‑Wusu began her career in London's financial services sector, holding roles at institutions including BNP Paribas, Goldman Sachs, Credit Lyonnais, and Deutsche Bank. Her work covered areas such as fixed income trading, structured finance, and sovereign advisory.

=== Woodhall Capital ===
In 2014, Hunponu‑Wusu established Woodhall Capital in Lagos. According to interviews and press reports, the firm has facilitated cross-border funding transactions involving sovereign and corporate clients and later expanded to London (2019), Dubai (2020), and Abuja (2024). In July 2024, Woodhall Finance House, a subsidiary of the firm, obtained a license from the Central Bank of Nigeria.

== Initiatives in the creative industry ==
In 2025, Hunponu‑Wusu collaborated with Titi Ogufere of Design Week Lagos to launch The Design Den, an initiative aimed at supporting Nigerian designers through funding and mentorship. Through Woodhall Finance House, she also participated in launching a ₦1.5 billion Creative Sector Fund in partnership with Polaris Bank and the UK Government under the UK-Nigeria Enhanced Trade and Investment Partnership. The initiative included a podcast series titled Creative Currency, which featured panelists from various public and private sector organizations.

== Community engagement ==
Hunponu‑Wusu established the Woodhall Capital Foundation to support community development programs in education, healthcare, and food security. The foundation partners with schools and local authorities in underserved areas to improve access to services. In addition, she helped launch the Captains of Industry Mentorship Programme in collaboration with Mentor Intro Africa, aimed at connecting young entrepreneurs with senior business leaders.

== Public statements and interviews ==
In media interviews, Hunponu‑Wusu has discussed topics related to ethical finance and investment strategy. In a 2023 interview with Vanguard, she spoke about the role of personal ethics in leadership within Nigeria's financial industry. She has also expressed views on the importance of investment in non-oil sectors, including the creative economy.

== Recognition ==
Hunponu‑Wusu was listed among “50 Value-Driven CEOs of Excellence” in a feature by The Guardian (Nigeria). She has been profiled in publications such as BusinessDay, Vanguard, and ThisDay Style for her contributions to finance and entrepreneurship.

== Personal life ==
Hunponu‑Wusu has spoken in interviews about her personal values and interest in mentoring young professionals. She is married with children and has described her faith as influential in her approach to business and leadership.
