= Paul Pholeros =

Australian architect

Paul Pholeros AM
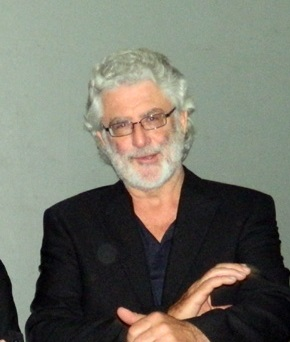
- Paul Pholeros at CAA Conference Dhaka 2013
- Born: 1953; Sydney, New South Wales, Australia
- Died: 1 February 2016 (aged 62); Sydney, Australia
- Education: University of Sydney
- Occupations: Architect; Educator
- Spouse: Sandra Meihubers
- Parent(s): Cecil Pholeros, Betty Pholeros
- Awards: Member of the Order of Australia (AM), AIA Leadership in Sustainability Prize
- Practice: Paul Pholeros Architects; Healthabitat
- Website: https://www.healthabitat.com/

Paul Anthony Pholeros AM (1953 – 1 February 2016) was an Australian architect and humanitarian.

== Biography ==
He received his Bachelor of Science in Architecture from the University of Sydney in 1974 and a Bachelor of Architecture (Hons 1) in 1976.

Pholeros established his own architectural practice, Paul Pholeros Architects, in 1984.

He was also a director of Healthabitat, a non-profit organisation which aimed to improve the health of disadvantaged people by assessing and improving their housing.

Pholeros was an adjunct professor of architecture at the University of Sydney. He was a vice-chairman and board member of Emergency Architects Australia.

In 2007, Pholeros was made a member of the Order of Australia (AM) in recognition of his persistence and outstanding service to the health and well-being of the Indigenous population of Australia and the Torres Strait Islands. The Order of Australia citation reads "For service to the community by improving the living conditions and, consequently, the health of Indigenous communities through the design, development and improvement of housing and the surrounding living environment and working with, and creating employment for, local Indigenous people."

Paul Pholeros died on 1 February 2016, aged 62.

== Awards ==
- Member of the Order of Australia (AM), 26 January 2007
- Former Vice Chair, Emergency Architects Australia; one of the four members appointed by the Prime Minister of Australia to the National Policy Commission on Remote Indigenous Housing 2007–2009
- Royal Australian Institute of Architects President's Award, 1994
- Royal Australian Institute of Architects Leadership in Sustainability Prize, (Healthabitat) 2011
- World Habitat Award – from the United Nations' Habitat and Building and Social Housing Foundation, (Healthabitat) 2011
