= Lawrence Nield =

Australian architect

- Born: 1941 (age 84–85); Melbourne, Australia
- Education: University of Sydney
- Occupation: Architect
- Awards: Canberra Medallion, 1989; Sir Zelman Cowen Award for Public Architecture, 1997; Ordre des Arts et des Lettres, 2007; Grand Architectural Creation Award, 2009; Australian Institute of Architects Gold Medal, 2012; Robin Gibson Award for Enduring Architecture, 2026
- Practice: BVN & Studio Nield, Sydney
- Buildings: Sunshine Coast University Library; Beijing Olympic Tennis Centre

Lawrence Nield is a retired Australian architect, who since 2012 has been head of the Heritage Council of New South Wales. He is also known for his writings on urban design. He was head of master planning for the 2000 Sydney Olympic Games. He was one of the founders of BVN Architecture (formerly Bligh Voller Nield).

== Architectural education ==
Neild graduated from the University of Sydney in 1963, winning the Baillieu Research Scholarship. He was awarded the Byera Hadley Travelling Scholarship in 1964 and undertook a Master of Literature at Cambridge, England.

== Government Architect role ==
In March 2013 Nield was appointed the Northern Territory Government Architect a position he held until 2018. In 2010 Lawrence Nield founded Studio Nield with his partner Andrea Nield in Sydney.

== Recognition ==
He won the Australian Institute of Architects 2012 Gold Medal for Outstanding Achievement, and the French Republic's Order of Arts and Letters in 2007, and the 1997 Sir Zelman Cowen Award for Public Architecture, which he won for the design of the Sunshine Coast University Library.

== Designs ==
Nield's designs include:

- Ultimo Community Centre, Sydney, NSW
- UNSW L5 Building, Sydney, (2005) – 2007 RIBA International Award
- Sunshine Coast University Library, Maroochydore, Queensland (1997) – 1998 RAIA Sir Zelman Cowen Award for Public Architecture
- Questacon, Canberra, ACT
- St Vincent's Hospital
- The King's School gymnasium
- 10 Mort Street, Canberra, ACT
- David Maddison Clinical Sciences Building, Newcastle, NSW
- Cook and Phillip Aquatic Centre, Sydney, NSW
- Olympic Green Tennis Center, Beijing
- Sydney International Tennis Centre, (1998) – 1999 RAIA NSW Sulman Award
- Overseas Passenger Terminal, Sydney, (1988) – 1988 RAIA National Civic Design Award
- Caroline Chisholm High School, ACT, (1986)
- Mount Druitt Hospital, (1982) – 1983 RAIA NSW Chapter Merit Award Architectural Works
- David Maddison Building – Clinical Sciences Building, University of Newcastle, (1981) – 1982 RAIA NSW Chapter Merit Award

Professional and academic associations
Preceded by Kevin Rice	President of the Royal Australian Institute of Architects (NSW Chapter); 1986–1988	Succeeded by Louise Cox
Government offices
Preceded by Bob Nation	Northern Territory Government Architect; 2013–date	Incumbent
