= Interior Designers Association of Nigeria =

Interior Designers in Nigeria

- Abbreviation: IDAN
- Formation: 2007; 19 years ago
- Headquarters: Lagos, Nigeria
- Board of directors: Ekua Abudu, Titi Ogufere, Ifeyinwa Ighodalo, Debola Omooba, Ken Ubah, Tola Akerele, Kaine Dosekun
- Affiliations: International Federation of Interior Architects/Designers
- Website: idanng.org//

The Interior Designers Association of Nigeria (IDAN) is the professional body of interior designers and suppliers in Nigeria. Founded in 2007 by Titi Ogufere, IDAN is the leading authority representing members who are mainly qualified interior designers, dealers of interior design products, finishing companies, and interior decorators in Nigeria. It has its headquarters in Lagos, with regional offices in Abuja and Port Harcourt.

== History ==
At its inception in 2017, IDAN's founding board members were Titi Ogufere, Ekua Abudu, Munirat Shonibare, Anselm Tabansi, Moni Fagbemi, Sarah Daniel and Mathew Eshalomi as board members.

Interior Designers Association of Nigeria, in 2017, hosted the first ever edition of African Culture and Design Festival in Africa, teaming up with 2017 congress of International Federation of Interior Architects/Designers (IFI), a body of professional interior architects and interior designers.

== See also ==
- Interior Design
- American Society of Interior Designers
