= Arthur William Forster Bligh =

Amazing story and facts

Arthur William Forster Bligh (1905-1998) was an Australian architect, who designed a number of Art Deco buildings in Queensland in the twentieth century.

== Early life ==
Arthur W. F. Bligh was born on 27 May 1905 in Mosman, New South Wales to A.C.V. Bligh a grazier and his wife. He became an articled pupil of architect William Hodgen in Toowoomba, Queensland from 1922-1926. He began his own practice as an architect from 1926-33 in Toowoomba and then from 1933 in Brisbane. He became a registered architect in 1929.

After taking on domestic, commercial, industrial and ecclesiastical projects in Toowoomba, he moved to Brisbane in 1934. He formed a partnership with Colin Jessup. Bligh was a well known architect of Art Deco style blocks of flats during the 1930s until the war intervened.

He volunteered during WW2 in the Australian Army. He was employed by the USA Service Drawing Office in 1942. Following the War he returned to private practice. In 1956 Bligh and Jessup entered into partnership with Athol Bretnall and Ronald Voller. Their practice was named Bligh Jessup Bretnall and Partners. His son, Graham entered the partnership in 1965. The firm is now called Bligh Voller Nield Architects and operates as BVN Architects.

In the 1960s the Nicklin government of Queensland was keen to move forward with the 'Bligh Plan' put forward by him for significant urban planning changes. It proposed inner city revival and urban planning, blocking off areas of the city from vehicular access, developing pedestrian precincts, open parkland and the redevelopment of the Roma Street Markets.

Arthur Bligh retired in 1974.

== Personal life ==
Bligh married Millie Gaydon in 1930. He died on 8 August 1998 in Brisbane. He was survived by his wife and two sons. His grandson Christopher Bligh is also an architect.

== Notable works ==
New Redeemer Lutheran Church, Toowoomba (1929)

St Patricks Cathedral, Toowoomba (alterations), 1930

St James Church, Toowoomba (1931)

13 Apex Street, Clayfield (1934)

Heilbron Holiday Apartment block, Mooloolabah Beach (1936)

Marford Court, Spring Hill (1936)

Carmel Court (1937), South Brisbane

Regina Court (1939)

Sans Souci Private Hospital, Gold Coast (1938)

Ellenglaze, Toowoomba (1938)

Yale Apartments, Upper Edward Street, Brisbane (1940)

Dorelle, Highgate Hill (1940)

Hartle Court, New Farm (1941)

Carmody Road, St Lucia

Adelea, New Farm (1941)

Bowling Centre, Greenslopes (1959)

Camden, 11 Hillside Crescent, Hamilton (1959)

AMOCO service stations (1960)

Buildings, Queensland Agricultural College, Gatton (1964)

Supreme Court Building, George and Adelaide Street, Brisbane (1967–68)

== Legacy ==
Copies of his plans are held in the University of Queensland, Fryer Library and State Library of Queensland collections.
