= BVN Architecture =

Australian architecture firm

BVN

Practice information
- Partners: Ali Bounds; Bill Dowzer; Brian Donovan; Catherine Skinner; David Kelly; Ian Kirkland; Julian Ashton; Kevin O'Brien; Kirstie Irwin; Matthew Blair; Neil Logan; Peter Titmuss; Phillip Rossington; Sally Campbell; Stephanie Costelloe
- Founders: Lawrence Nield; Graham Bligh; Jon Voller
- Founded: 1997
- Location: Sydney (head office)

Significant works and honors
- Projects: 2004 Athens Olympic Games; 2008 Beijing Olympic Games; 2012 London Olympic Games
- Awards: Sir John Sulman Medal (2000, 2003, 2006, 2011, 2012, 2015, 2025); International Architecture Award (2013); World Architecture Festival (2010); RIBA International Award (2007, 2011); Sir Zelman Cowen Award for Public Architecture (2025)

Website
- www.bvn.com.au

BVN is one of Australia's largest architecture practices, with studios in Sydney, Brisbane, New York and London.

== History ==
The firm was founded in Brisbane in 1926 by Arthur Bligh, with Colin Jessup joining him later as a partner. After the Second World War, Athol Bretnall and Ronald Voller joined the partnership, leading to its name being changed to Bligh, Jessup, Bretnall and Partners. Arthur Bligh's son Graham entered the partnership in 1965, followed by Ronald Voller's son Jon.

The firm was renamed Bligh Voller Architects in the early 1990s. In the late 1990s (1997 to 1999), the firm became Bligh Voller Nield, through mergers with Sydney-based firm Lawrence Nield and Partners Australia, Grose Bradley and Melbourne-based firm Pels Innes Neilson and Kosloff.

Bligh Voller Nield became BVN Architecture in 2009 and merged with Donovan Hill in 2013 to form BVN Donovan Hill. In 2014 the practice transitioned to the name BVN.

BVN is a large architectural firm, employing over 300 staff. Its portfolio includes projects such as airports, commercial and public buildings. Beyond its work in Australia, it has also designed facilities for the 2004 Athens Olympic Games, 2008 Beijing Olympic Games and 2012 London Olympic Games.

== Notable projects ==
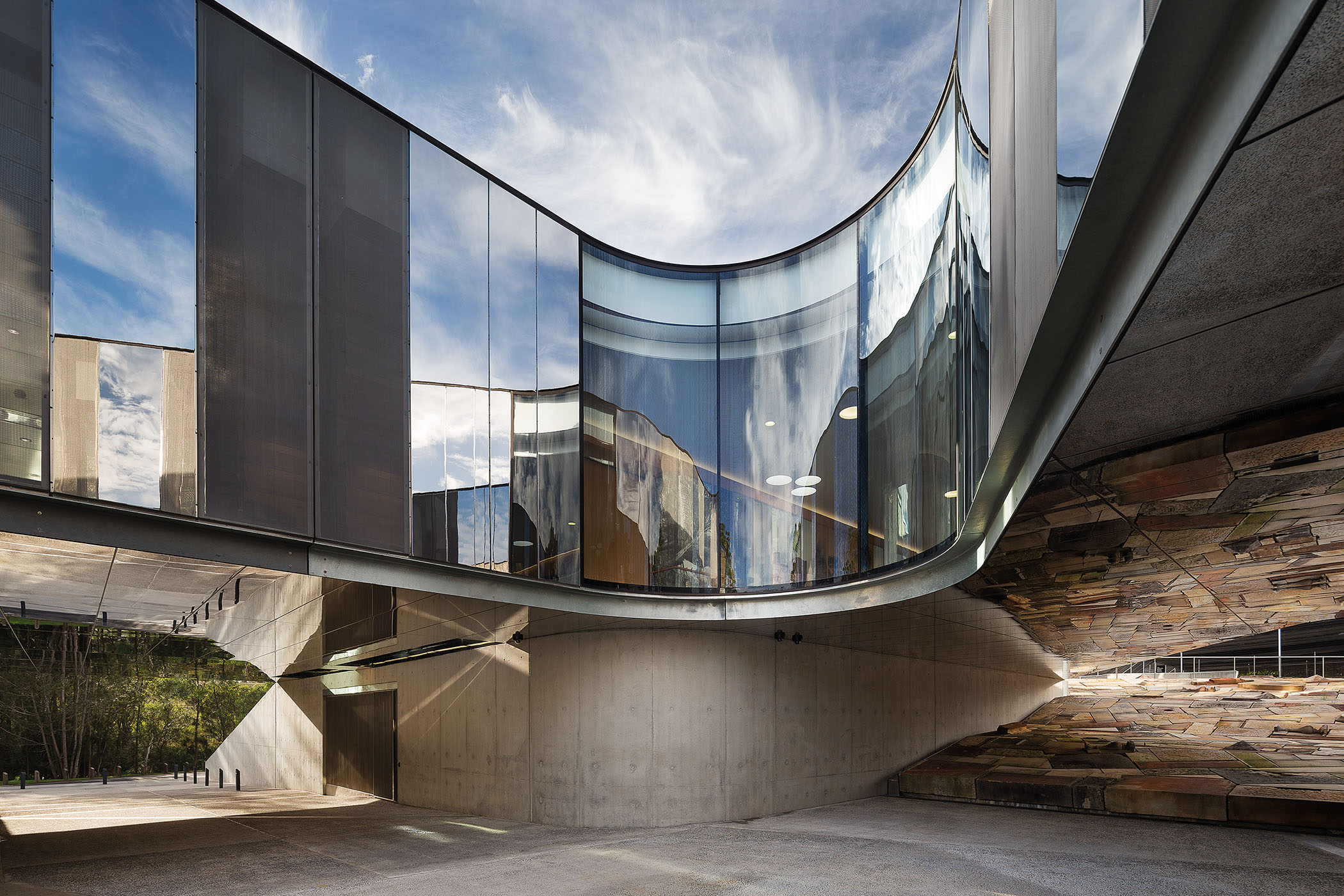
The Australian PlantBank

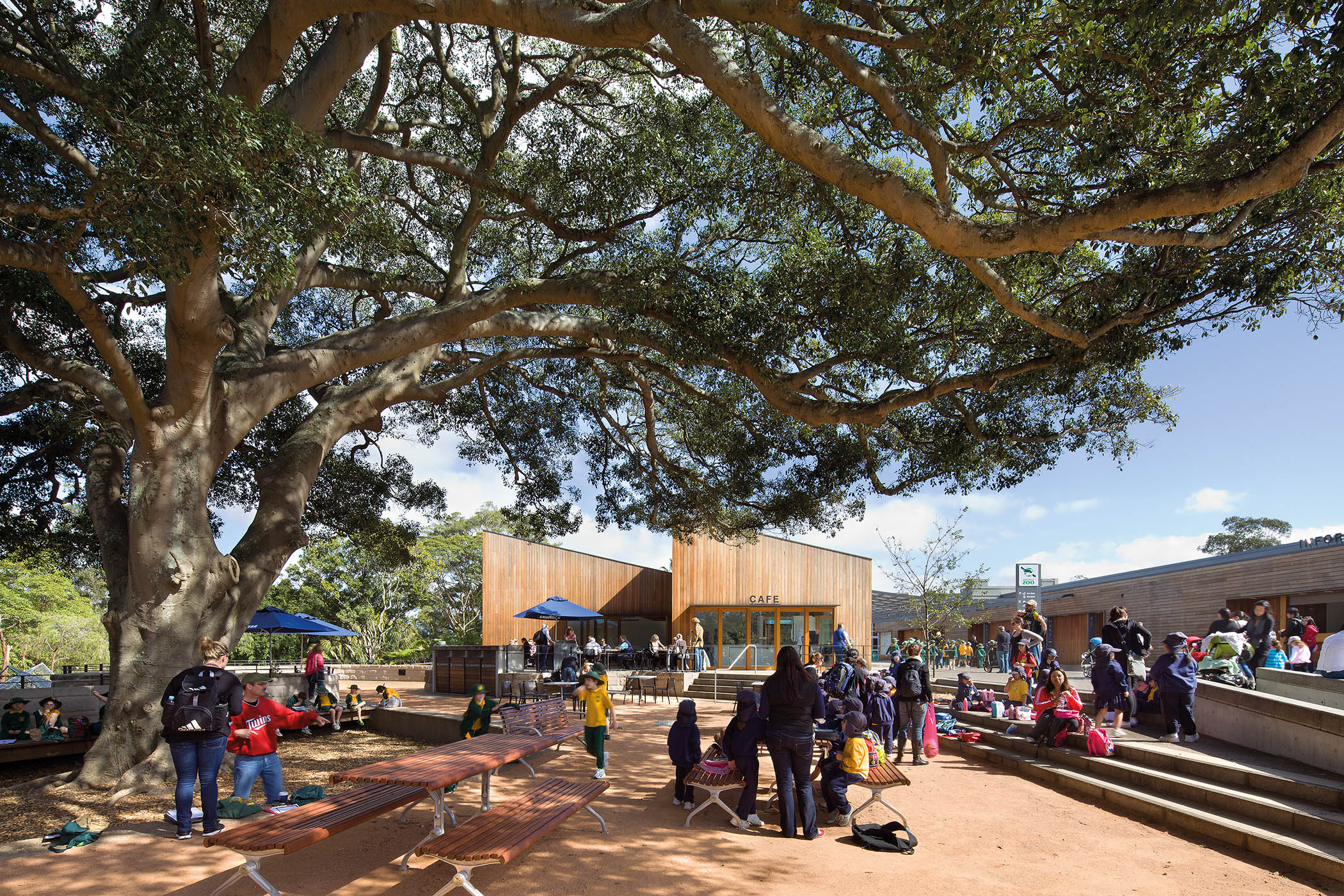
Taronga Zoo

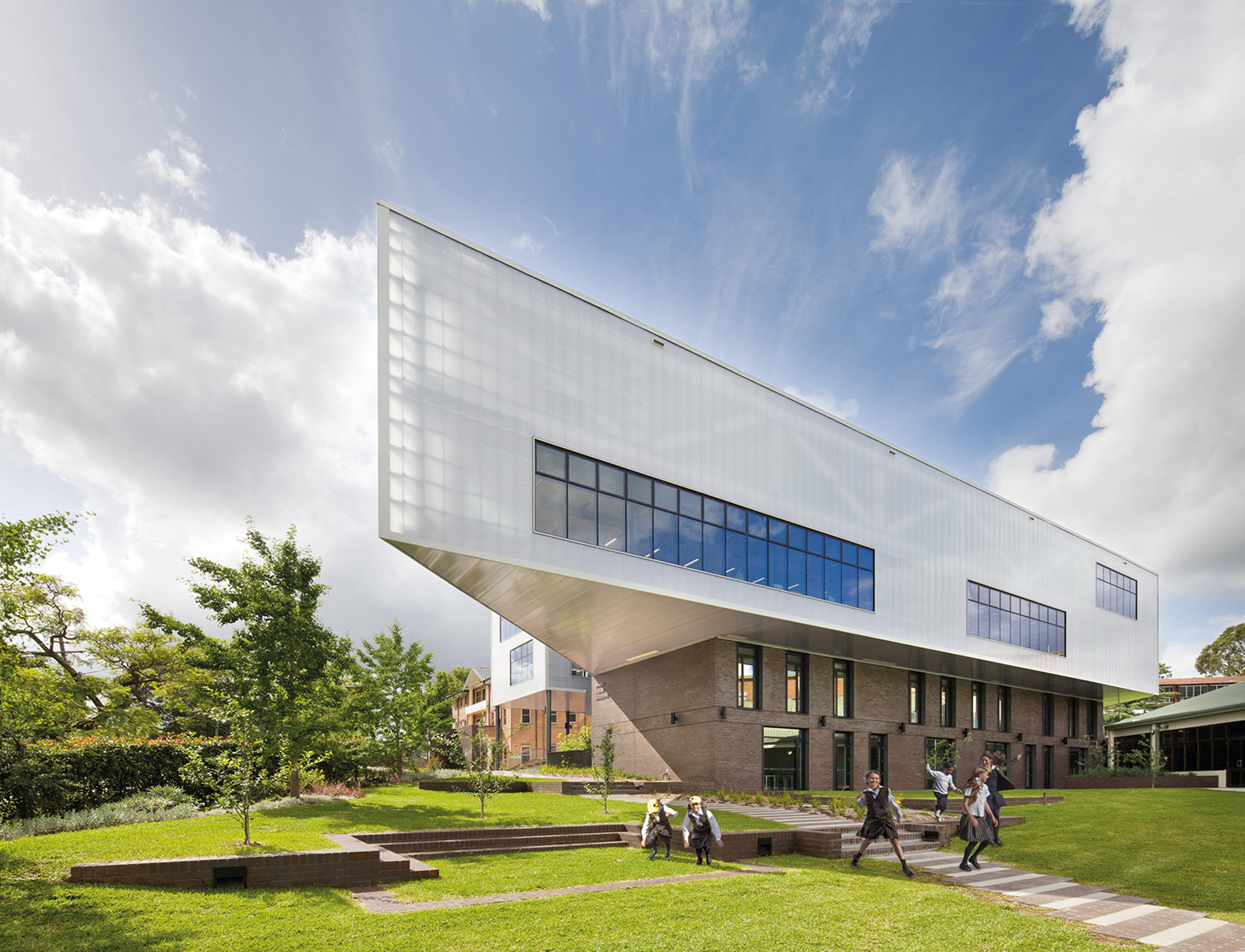
Ravenswood School for Girls

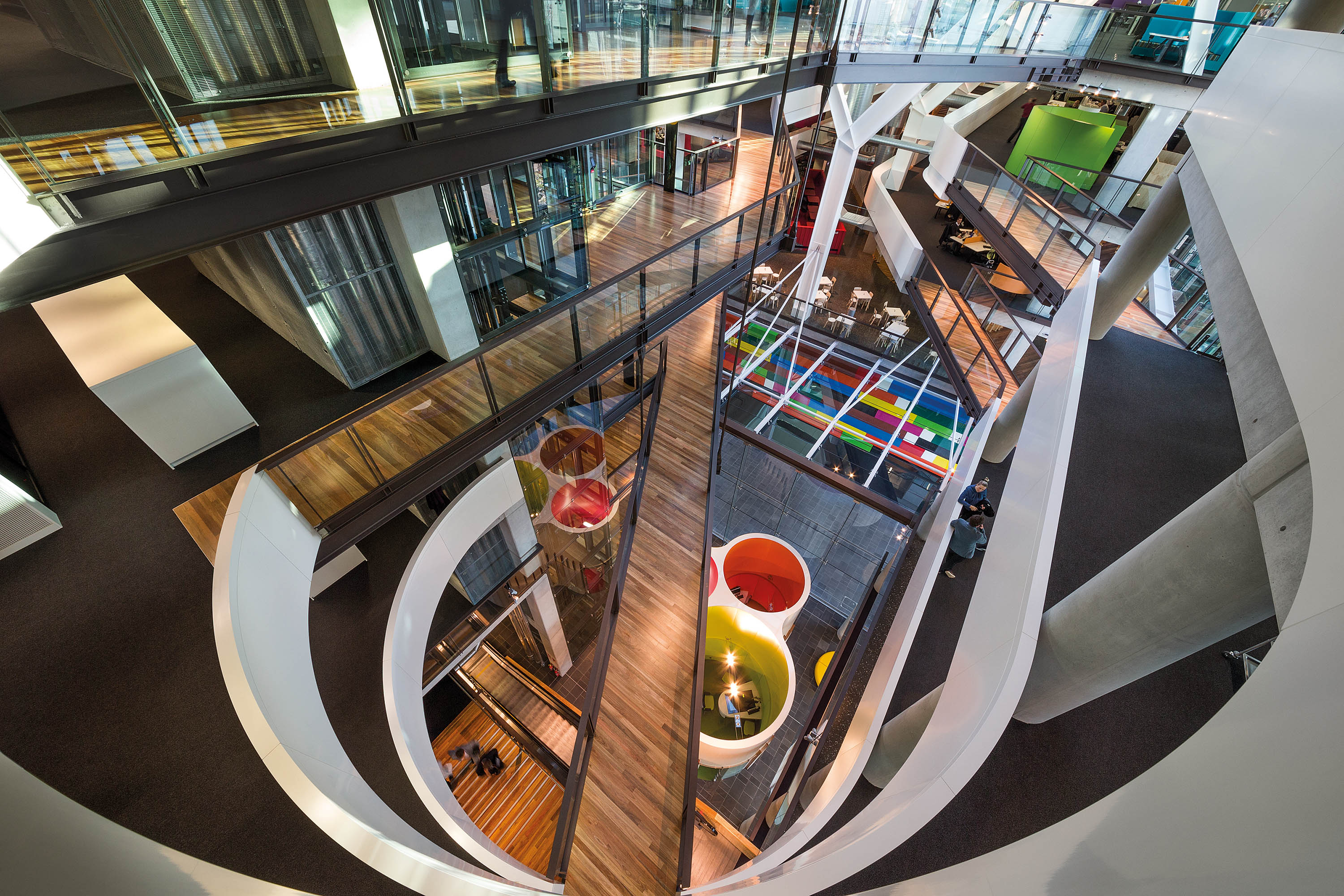
ASB New Zealand

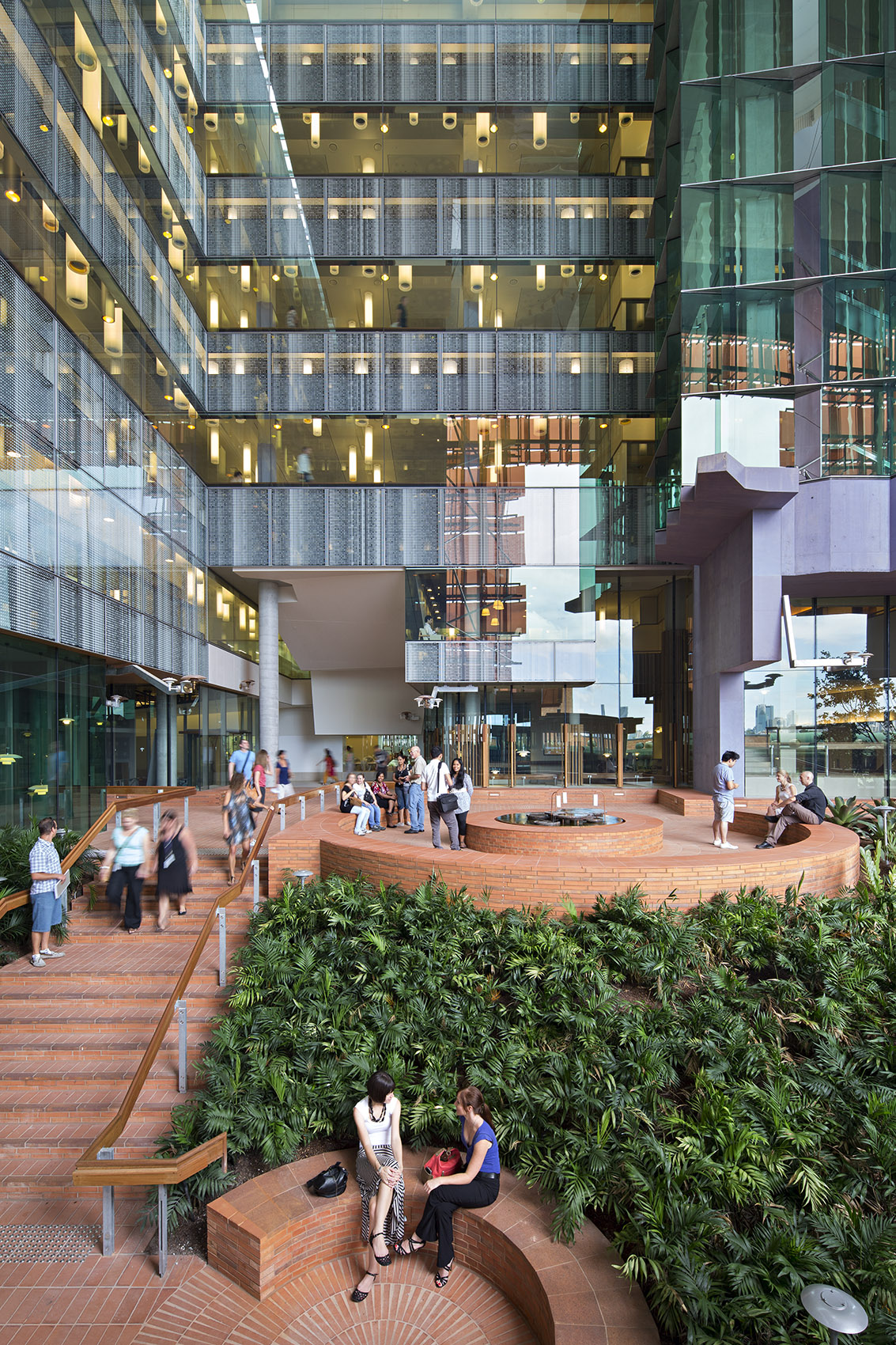
Translational Research Institute (In Association with Wilson Architects)

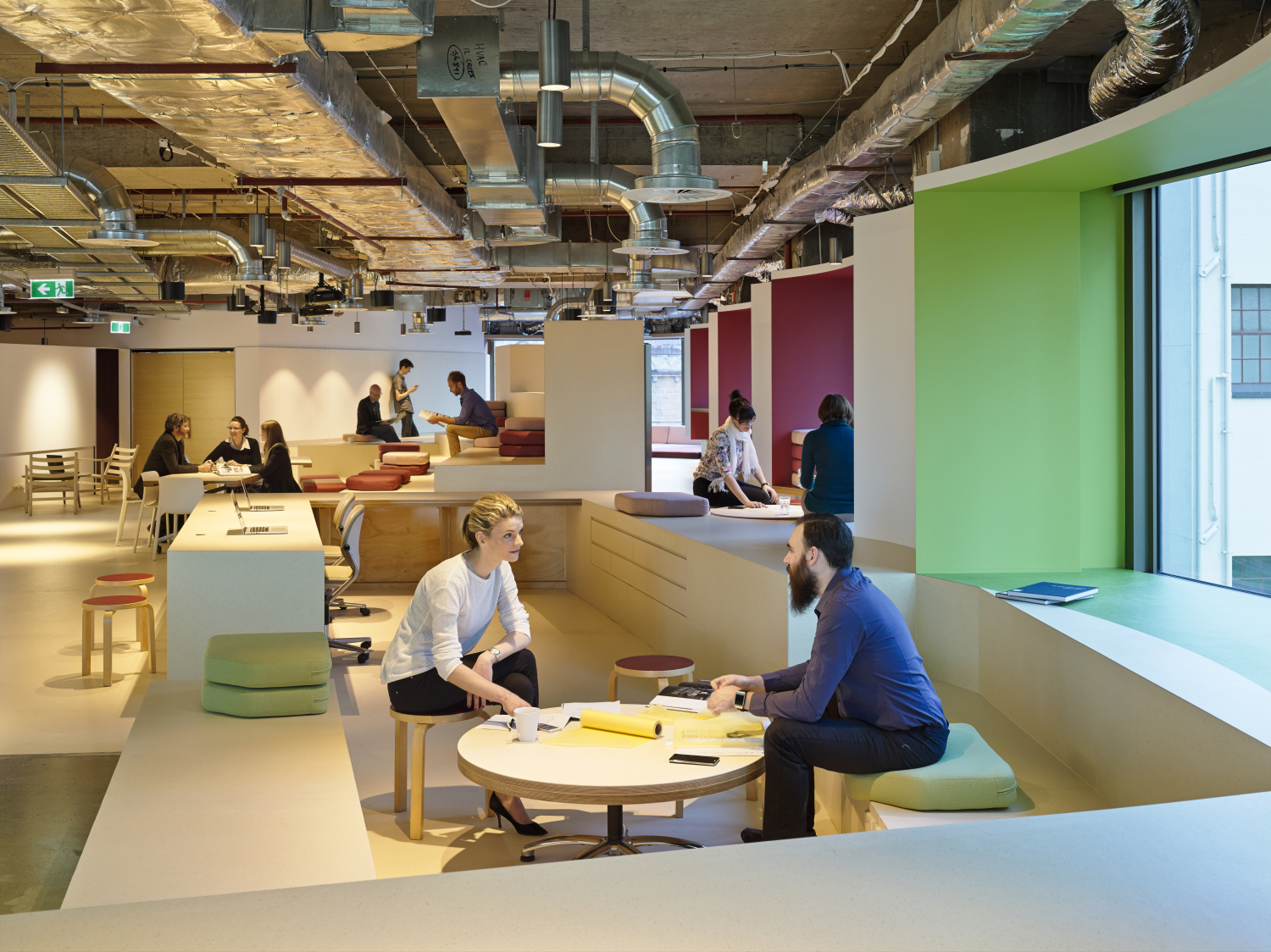
BVN Brisbane Studio

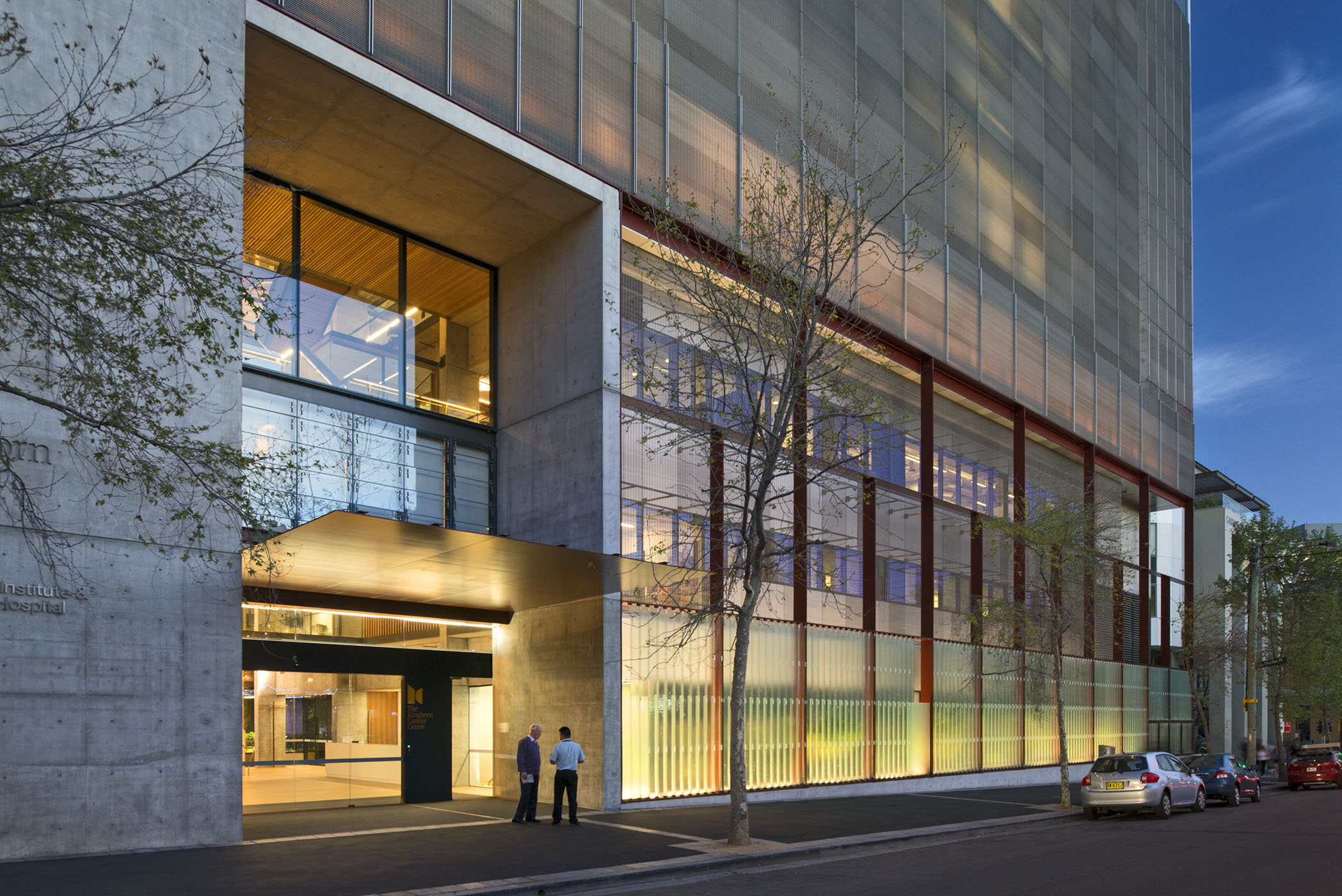
The Kinghorn Cancer Centre

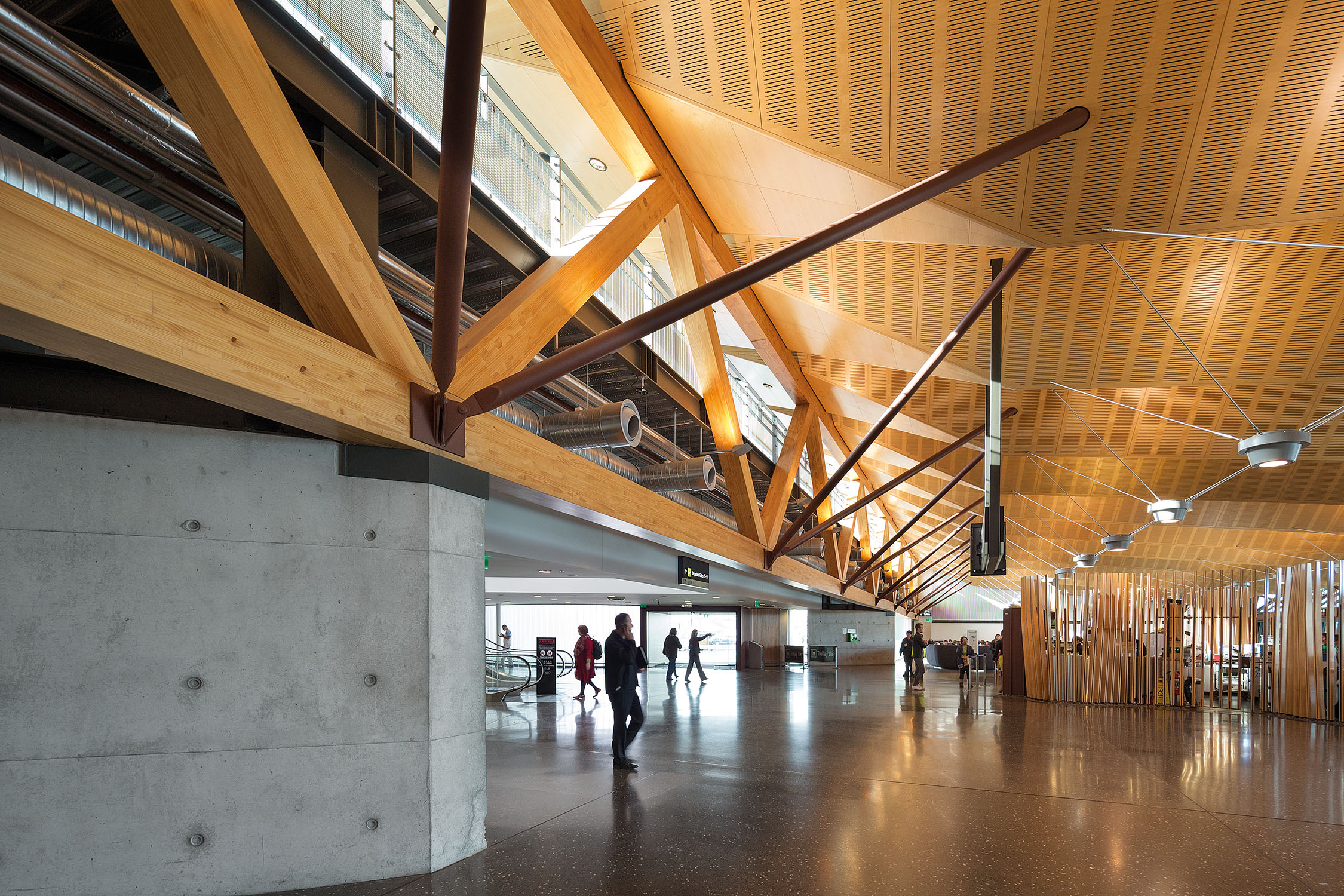
Regional Terminal at Christchurch Airport

BVN has designed numerous award-winning buildings, including the following projects:

Completed	Project name	Location	Award	Notes
2000	Sydney Olympic Park Tennis Centre		Sir John Sulman Medal, 2000	
2003	University of Technology Sydney, City Campus, Building 10	Broadway, Sydney	Sir John Sulman Medal, 2003	
2006	36/37 Squadron Headquarters, RAAF		Sir John Sulman Medal, 2006	
2014	Australian PlantBank	Australian Botanic Garden, Mount Annan	WAF High Commendation Research Buildings; RAIA National Award for Sustainable Architecture; RAIA National Award for Public Architecture	
2012	Taronga Zoo	Mosman, Sydney	RAIA Urban Design Award; PIA Australia Award for Urban Design Small Scale Commendation	
2012	Ravenswood School for Girls, Mabel Fidler Building	Gordon, Sydney	Think Brick Landscape Award; RAIA Public Building Awards; RAIA NSW Sir John Sulman Medal for Public Architecture; MBA NSW Private School Construction Award; ATFA Factory Finished Floor of the Year Award for Excellence; ASI Large Projects Highly Commended; International Architecture Award (2013); Chicago Antheneum International Architecture Award (2013); AIDA Winner – Interior Design Impact (2015)	
2014	ASB North Wharf	new Wynyard Quarter, Auckland, New Zealand	NZIA Architecture Award – Sustainable Architecture; NZIA Architecture Award – Commercial Architecture; NZIA Architecture Award – Interior Architecture; NZIA Architecture Medal; New Zealand Commercial Project Awards – Gold Award; Property Council New Zealand – merit in Resene Green Building Property Award; Property Council New Zealand – Hays Commercial Office Property Award; Supreme Award – Property Council New Zealand Rider Levett Bucknall Property Industry Awards; RAIA Interior Architecture Award in the International category; WAF High Commendation Office Buildings; IDEA High Commendation International category	
2013	Translational Research Institute	Princess Alexandra Hospital, Brisbane	RAIA National Award for Interior Architecture; RAIA National Award for Public Architecture; RAIA QLD Sustainable Architecture Commendation; RAIA QLD FDG Stanley Award for Best Public Building; RAIA Brisbane Sustainable Architecture Commendation; RAIA Brisbane John Dalton Award for Building of the Year; IDA Public Design High Commendation; IDA Best of State Commercial Award; TDA Best Northern Region Award for Excellence; Lighting Design Award of Excellence (IES Lighting Design Awards Qld Chapter); Luminaire Design: Commendation (IES Lighting Design Awards Qld Chapter)	
2014	Christchurch Airport, Regional Terminal	Christchurch, New Zealand	NZIA Architecture Award – Commercial Architecture; NZIA Architecture Award – Interior Architecture; Shortlisted International Aviation Award; IDEA International Award	
2015	BVN Brisbane Studio	Brisbane, Queensland	RAIA Brisbane Regional Commendation – Interior Architecture (2015); AIDA Best of State QLD – Commercial Design (2015)	
2013	The Kinghorn Cancer Centre	Darlinghurst, Sydney	RAIA NSW John Verge Award for Interior Architecture (2013); Chicago Antheneum International Architecture Award; WAF High Commendation – Health	
2012	Puckapunyal Military Area Memorial Chapel		Chicago Athenaeum International Architecture Award (2012)	
2010	Brain and Mind Research Institute	University of Sydney, Sydney	RAIA NSW Sir John Sulman Medal (2011); RIBA International Award for Architectural Excellence (2011); International Health Design Award High Commendation (2011); World Architecture Festival – World Health Building (2010); Chicago Antheneum International Architecture Award (2012)	
	Robina Hospital Extension	Gold Coast, Queensland	RAIA Gold Coast and Northern Rivers Regional Commendation and Building of the Year (2012); AbaF Arts and Health Foundation Award (2011); WAN Awards – Winner Interior Design Healthcare (2011)	
2008	Stockland Head Office	Sydney	RAIA NSW Milo Dunphy Award for Sustainable Architecture (2008)	

== Employment Data ==
Metric	2014	2015	2016	2017	2018	2019	2020	2021	2022	2023
Female Employees (as a % of total)	43.7	47.6	47.3	47.2	46.9	-	49.1	-	-	48.3
Male Employees (as a % of total)	56.3	52.4	52.7	52.8	53.1	-	50.9	-	-	51.7

== See also ==
- Architecture of Australia
