= Australian PlantBank =

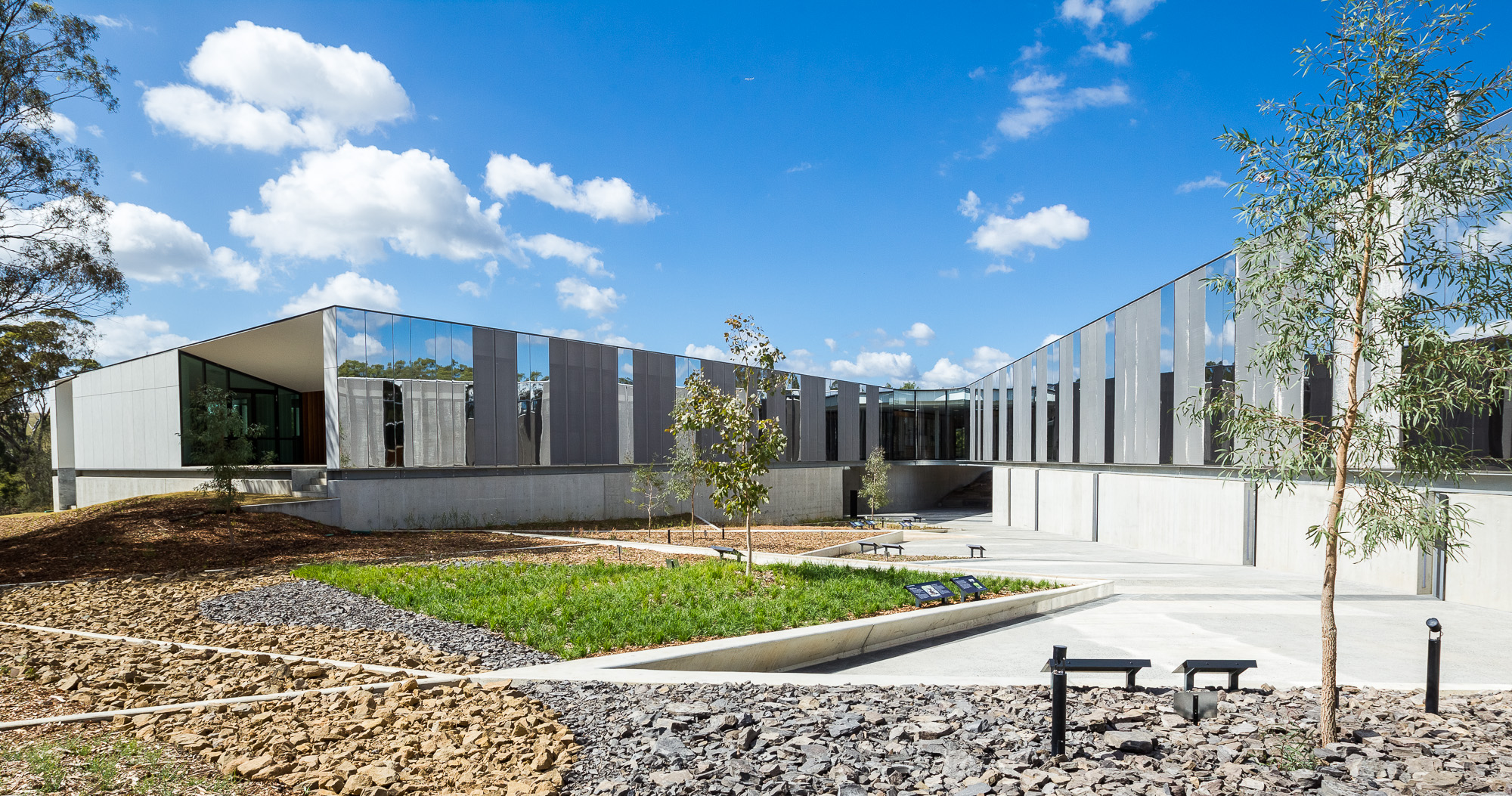
- One of the Australian PlantBank's buildings
- Interactive map of the Australian PlantBank area

General information
- Type: Seed bank Research institute Public building
- Location: Australian Botanic Garden, Mount Annan, New South Wales, Australia
- Coordinates: 34°04′01″S 150°46′08″E
- Opened: 11 October 2013
- Owner: Royal Botanic Gardens and Domain Trust

Design and construction
- Architecture firm: BVN
- Awards and prizes: Public Architecture: National Award – Australian Institute of Architects; 2014

The Australian PlantBank is a seed bank located in the Australian Botanic Gardens, Mount Annan. The seedbank is part of the Millennium Seed Bank Project. The SeedBank replaced the former NSW Seedbank as part of an upgrade.

== History ==
The former NSW Seedbank was established in 1986 and originally collected wild seed for the Gardens. The former seedbank went through an extensive upgrade in 1999 and ensured that the seeds were of high quality. The biggest and latest update was in 2013, where the NSW Seedbank turned into the Australian PlantBank.

In 2014 the new building, designed by BVN, received the National Award for Public Architecture from the Australian Institute of Architects.

== Opening ceremony ==
The opening ceremony for the Australian PlantBank was held on 11 October 2013. The seedbank was officially opened by Her Excellency Professor Marie Bashir. Other attendees included:

- The Honourable Robyn Parker MP, Minister for Environment and Heritage
- Mr Ken Boundy, Chair, Royal Botanic Gardens and Domain Trust
