= Mount Druitt Hospital =

- Blacktown-Mount Druitt Health; Western Sydney Local Health District

Geography
- Location: Mount Druitt, Sydney, New South Wales, Australia
- Coordinates: 33.7658°S 150.8297°E

Organisation
- Care system: Public Medicare (AU)
- Type: Teaching
- Affiliated university: Western Sydney University; The University of Sydney

Services
- Emergency department: Yes
- Beds: 200

Helipads
- Helipad: (ICAO: YXMD)

History
- Founded: 11 October 1982; 43 years ago

Links
- Website: Official Website
- Lists: Hospitals in Australia

Mount Druitt Hospital is a district general hospital in the Western Sydney suburb of Mount Druitt, New South Wales, Australia. It was opened by Her Majesty Queen Elizabeth II on 11 October 1982, and was designed by Lawrence Nield in 1980.

In 2015/2016, the average available bed number was 161. The hospital had 32,437 attendances in 2015/2016.

== Services ==
In addition to medical, surgical and paediatric patients, the hospital includes emergency, surgical, dental, palliative care services and Medical Imaging facilities. The operating suite was renamed in 2013 in honour of surgeon Dr Mac Wyllie.

Mount Druitt Hospital's Palliative Care Unit was Australia's leading palliative care service in 2014.

It is also considered the area's leading pediatric care facility with emergency and inpatient services for children.

== Expansion ==
In 2006, the state member Richard Amery announced extensions totalling 10 beds spread throughout various units within the hospital. This included aged care rehabilitation and emergency care.

In 2012, the NSW Government announced the Blacktown Mount Druitt Hospital Expansion Project Stage 1. At Mount Druitt Hospital, projects included an expanded Dental Unit with 8 additional dental chairs, a new Urgent Care Centre, main entry refurbishment, new ambulance bay, sterilising facility upgrade and expanded rehabilitation facilities. The Stage 1 Expansion projects were completed in 2014.

In 2017, stage 2 expansion delivered a new facility for addiction medicine, expanded surgical facilities and more imaging. A new community dialysis centre is due to open later in 2017.

On 14 March 2018, NSW Premier Gladys Berejiklian officially opened the new Community Dialysis Centre at Mount Druitt Hospital, marking the completion of the stage 2 hospital expansion which included a new Centre for Addiction Medicine, Pre-Admissions Clinic, expanded Recovery Unit for operating theatres, and a digital theatre.

The new Community Dialysis Centre has 12 treatment spaces for dialysis and was co-designed with patients, carers and staff to provide dialysis treatment closer to home in response to increasing demand for services.

The expansion projects were designed by architects Jacobs.

== Awards ==
- 1983 Royal Australian Institute of Architects NSW Merit Award

Nominated for the RAIA National Sir Zelman Cowen Award Awards/83 Architecture Australia December 1983 p6
