= State architect =

Many national governments and states have a public official titled the state architect or government architect. The specific duties and areas of responsibility of state architects vary, but they generally involve responsibility for the design and/or construction of public buildings in the state. The state architect and subordinates typically form an organizational unit variously named the Division of the State Architect, Office of the State Architect, or similar.

== Functions ==
Specific functions vary from state to state, but may include:

- Preparing designs and specifications for small and moderate-sized state-owned building or renovation projects
- Selecting and overseeing the work of architectural firms contracted by the state to prepare designs and specifications for larger state-owned building projects
- Reviewing and approving designs prepared by private-sector architects for "critical" buildings owned by political subdivisions of the state such as schools, police stations, fire stations, and/or hospitals
- Participating in the development of state building codes and regulations
- Developing and managing capital budgets for state building construction programs
- Providing or coordinating inspection programs for state building projects

The Division of the State Architect is typically separate from the licensing board that examines and licenses practicing architects in the state.

== History ==
=== United States ===
Isaac G. Perry is considered to have been the first state architect in New York. In 1883, governor Grover Cleveland appointed Perry to oversee construction activities at the state capitol. Although his official title was "Capitol Commissioner", by the mid- to late 1880s Perry had oversight responsibility for all state government building programs and he was commonly referred to as the "State Architect". The state legislature officially created the Office of the State Architect in 1899, and after Perry retired that same year, governor Theodore Roosevelt appointed George L. Heins to fill the position. Heins served until his death in 1907, and was succeeded by Franklin B. Ware. Ware held the position until 1912, when he was removed from office and replaced by Herman Hoefer. Lewis Pilcher was appointed to replace Hoefer in 1913, and held the position until 1923. New York created an official Department of Architecture in 1914, during Pilcher's service.

In California, the Office of the State Architect (now Division of the State Architect) was created by the Field Act, which authorized the new office to develop design standards and quality control procedures for architectural work. George Sellon was the first State Architect for California. . Chester (Chet) A. Widom was the last state architect but retired in early 2019, and the current acting state architect is Ida Clair.

=== Australia ===
Currently there is a government architect in each Australian state, with the exception of Tasmania. Although their role differs from state to state, it generally includes the general objective to improve the design of public buildings and spaces and to enhance the quality of the built environment.

Since 1832 in New South Wales there was a position of Colonial Architect responsible for public works. In 1890 it was renamed to Government Architect. The Queensland Colonial Architect position was established in 1859. A government architect position named Principal Architect was created in Western Australia in 1891. The Northern Territory Government Architect role was first established in 2004, while in Victoria the role was first established in 2005.

== Requirements ==
Requirements vary from state to state, but usually state architects are required to be licensed to practice the profession of architecture in the state in question and to be a legal resident of that state. Because the job often involves managing large staffs, projects, and budgets, state architects are usually senior members of the architectural profession.

== See also ==
- Chief Government Architect of the Netherlands
- Chief architect (Sri Lanka)
- Guðjón Samúelsson (a state architect of Iceland)
- State Architects of Ohio
