= Colonial Architect =

Colonial Architect may refer to:

- Colonial Architect of New Zealand
- Colonial Architect of South Australia
- Queensland Colonial Architect, a position with responsibility for the design of government buildings in Queensland

== See also ==
- Government Architect (disambiguation)
