= Emergency Architects Foundation =

- Formation: 2001
- Type: NGO
- Legal status: Foundation
- Purpose: Humanitarianism
- Headquarters: Paris, Sydney, Montreal

The Emergency Architects Foundation is a French non-governmental organization, reconnue d'utilité publique. It is organised as a not-for-profit foundation with the French Order of Architects as supporters and is accredited by the United Nations and the European Union. The Emergency Architects Foundation is also present in Australia (Emergency Architects Australia) and in Canada (Emergency Architects Canada). The aim of Emergency Architects is to bring help and technical aid to the victims of natural, technological and human disasters, not only in safety and security evaluations of the populations but also in post-disaster reconstruction programs focused on long-term development and risk mitigation.

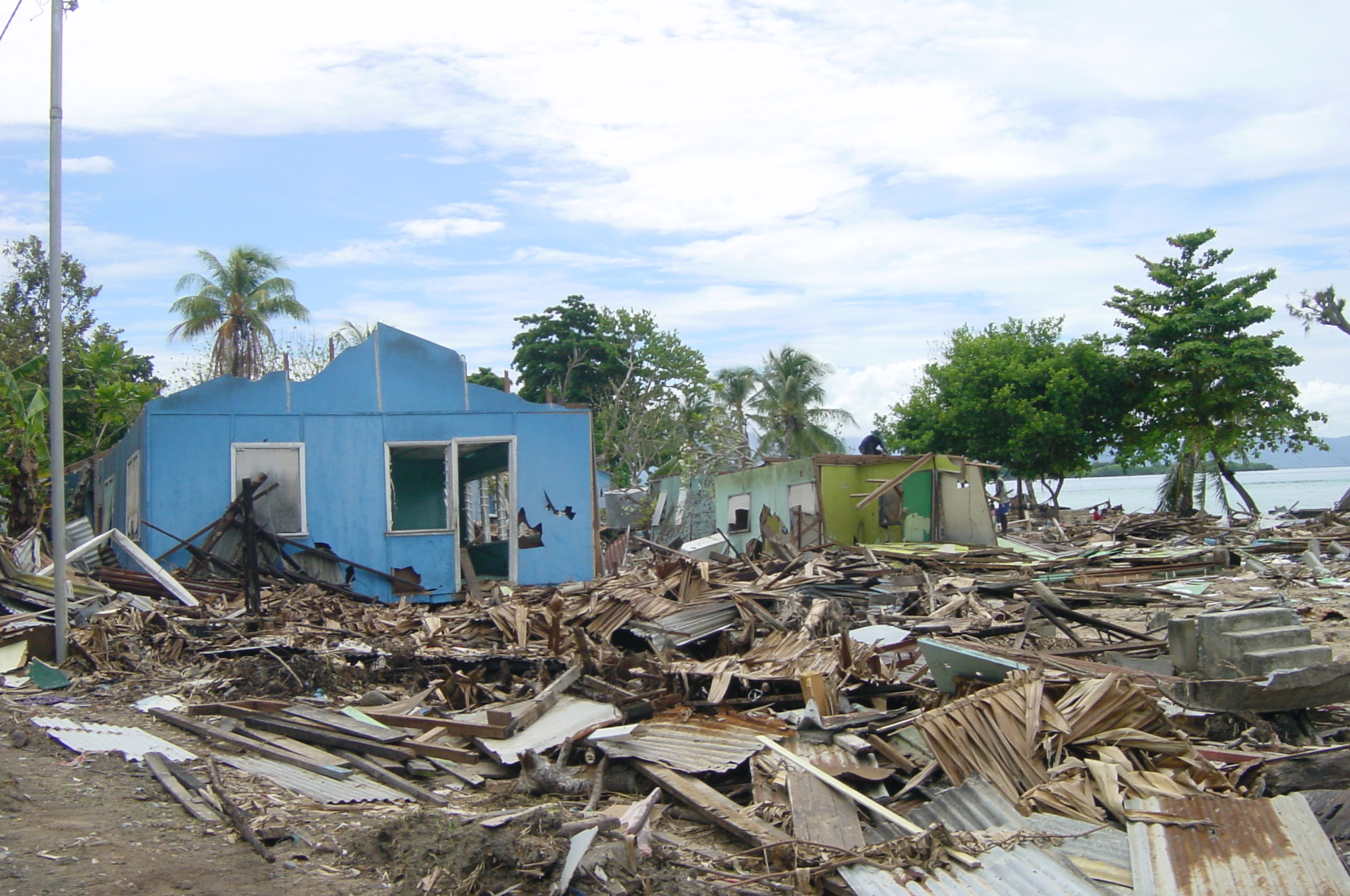
Destruction in Solomon Islands after tsunami (2004)

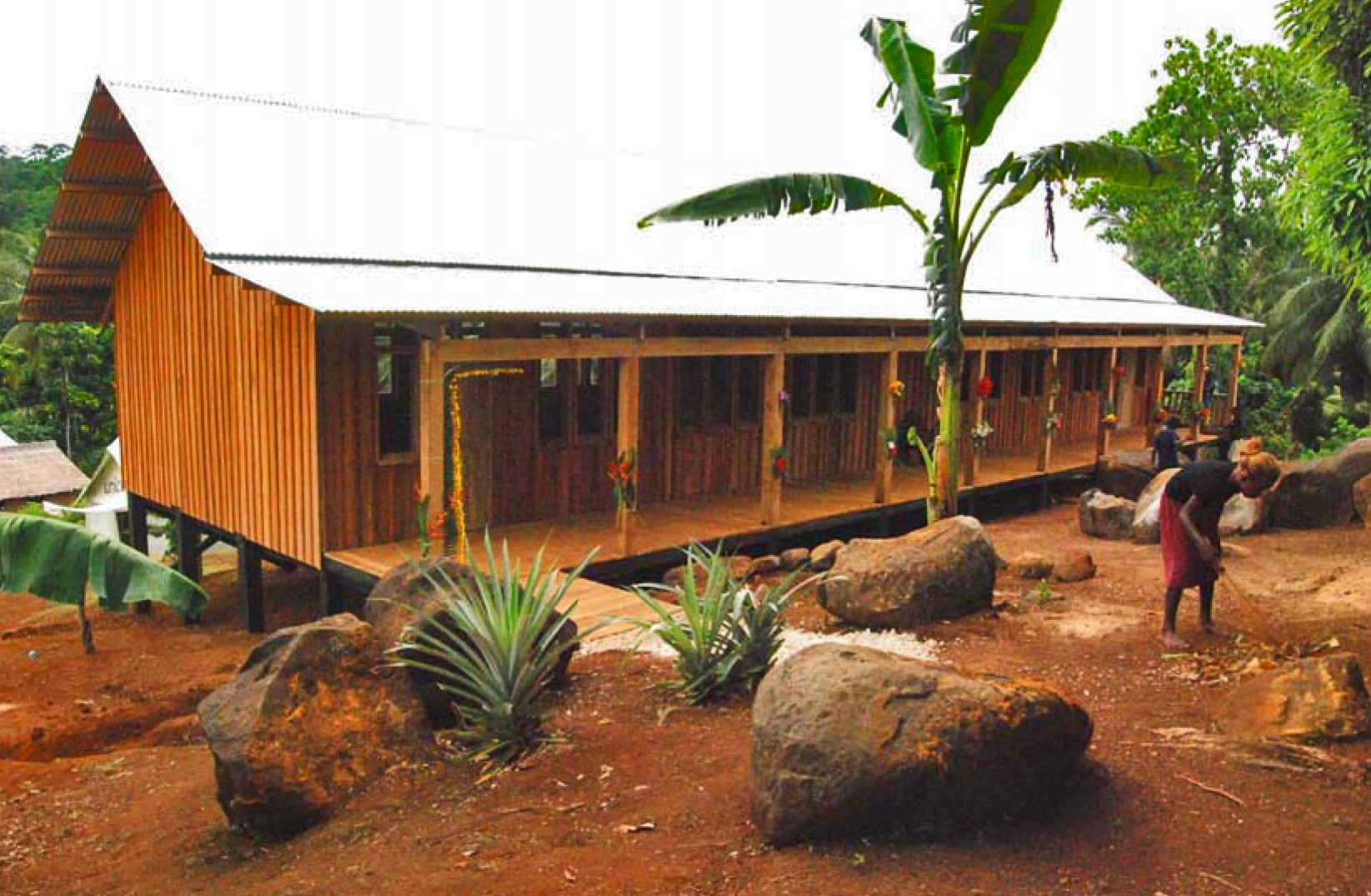
School, Ngari, Solomon Islands (2008)

== History ==
The Emergency Architects Foundation was created in April 2001 by Patrick Coulombel (architect) in Amiens in Picardy, France as a result of the flooding of the River Somme in 2001. A group of architects formed the organisation so as to mobilize technical assistance to the disaster victims and protect the rich cultural heritage of the region.

Emergency Architects Australia (EAA) was started in 2005 in response to the Indonesian tsunami and since that has worked in Indonesia, Pakistan, the Solomon Islands, Sri Lanka, Timor Leste, Papua New Guinea, Cook Islands, India and Australia. The president of EAA is Andrea Nield. EAA has over 300 members and is supported by the Union of International Architects, Australian Institute of Architects National, the Victorian and NSW RAIA Chapters, and The Council of the City of Sydney. Among the important collaborators are The European Union, UNHCR, UNICEF, NZAID, Australian Red Cross, World Vision, and Caritas.

Emergency Architects Canada was founded in 2007 The president is Bernard Mac Namara.

Emergency Architects has already led 28 actions in 24 countries, made more than 39,600 assessments and about 8,500 buildings.

At the moment, the foundation is undertaking 12 programs in the following countries: Afghanistan, Solomon Islands, Indonesia, Lebanon, Pakistan, Peru, Sri Lanka Chad, East Timor and Australia.

== Aims ==
The main objectives of the Emergency Architects Foundation are:

1. to support and develop architects' humanitarian engagement in France and worldwide and thus to contribute to the development of architecture,
2. to train architects with skills to help populations affected by natural, technological or human disasters,
3. to encourage architects training in France and in the World
4. to preserve and promote architectural, historical and cultural world heritage.

== Functioning ==
The architects, engineers and planners have used their professional expertise (knowledge of risk prevention and of building) to provide appropriate and sustainable assistance to the populations affected by natural (tsunami, earthquake), technological (chemical factory explosion) or human (civil) disasters. They always work with local populations and use local materials in their buildings.

The foundation employs 533 persons from 23 countries. Overall, more than 1,200 architects and engineers have been involved in Emergency Architects achievements in 21 countries.

== Fields of operation ==
The foundation takes part in the following operations:

Emergency

- Cartographic Evaluation Missions and Field work evaluation, in order to allow to the architects to quickly understand the disaster and its effects on the population, to estimate the extent of damage, to identify and define the human and logistical means for ensuring the immediate safety of populations and their quick rehousing.
- Facilitate ethical partnerships between Emergency Architects, local communities, local governments and aid organisations.
- Safety of the populations by the installation of safety perimeters around damaged construction which could present potential danger, survey public services and housing, organize strategies for stabilisation or evacuation of inhabitants in case of danger, and by identifying strategic methods to provide security of a population.
- Missions in Refugee camps to improve living conditions of refugee populations in these Refugee camps.

Rebuilding

- Help to rebuild sustainable and decent housing and restore basic economic and education infrastructure.

Re-house displaced populations.

- Risk prevention: Analyse relevant environmental, urban, technological and architectural factors with regards to rebuilding safely.
- Capacity building: Preserve traditional know-how while adding features to make them resistant to future disasters.

Promote the training of locals, from masons to architects.

== Actions and interventions ==
France

- Floods of the Somme Region (2001)
- AZF chemical factory explosion (2001)
- Floods of the Gard Region (2002)
- Earthquake in Martinique (2007)

Africa

- Algeria, Bourmerdès earthquake (2003)
- Morocco, Al Hoceima earthquake (2004)
- Chad, Refugee camps in the east of the Chad (2007)
- Sudan, displacement refugee report (2007)
- RDC, displacement study
- Mauritius, slum remediation (2008)
- Madagascar, earthquake (2004)
- Senegal, schools building program

Asia

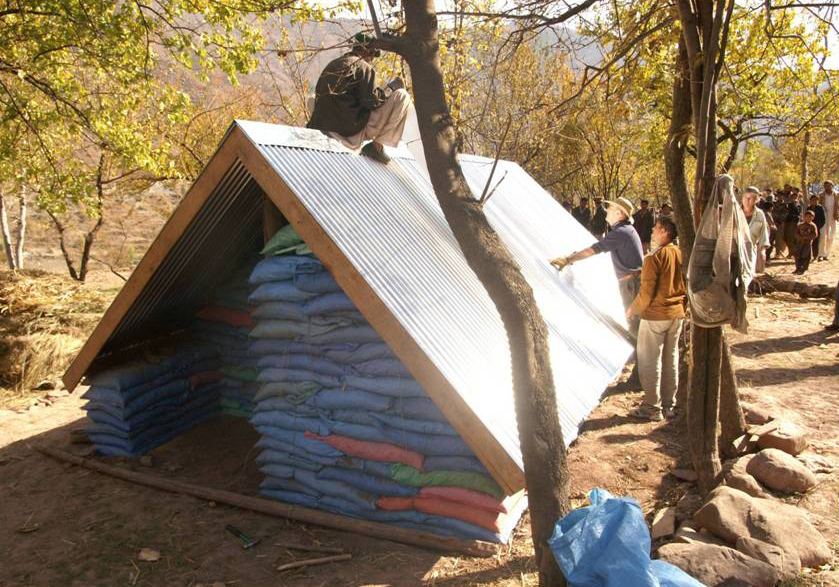
Emergency shelter in Pakistan after earthquake (2005)

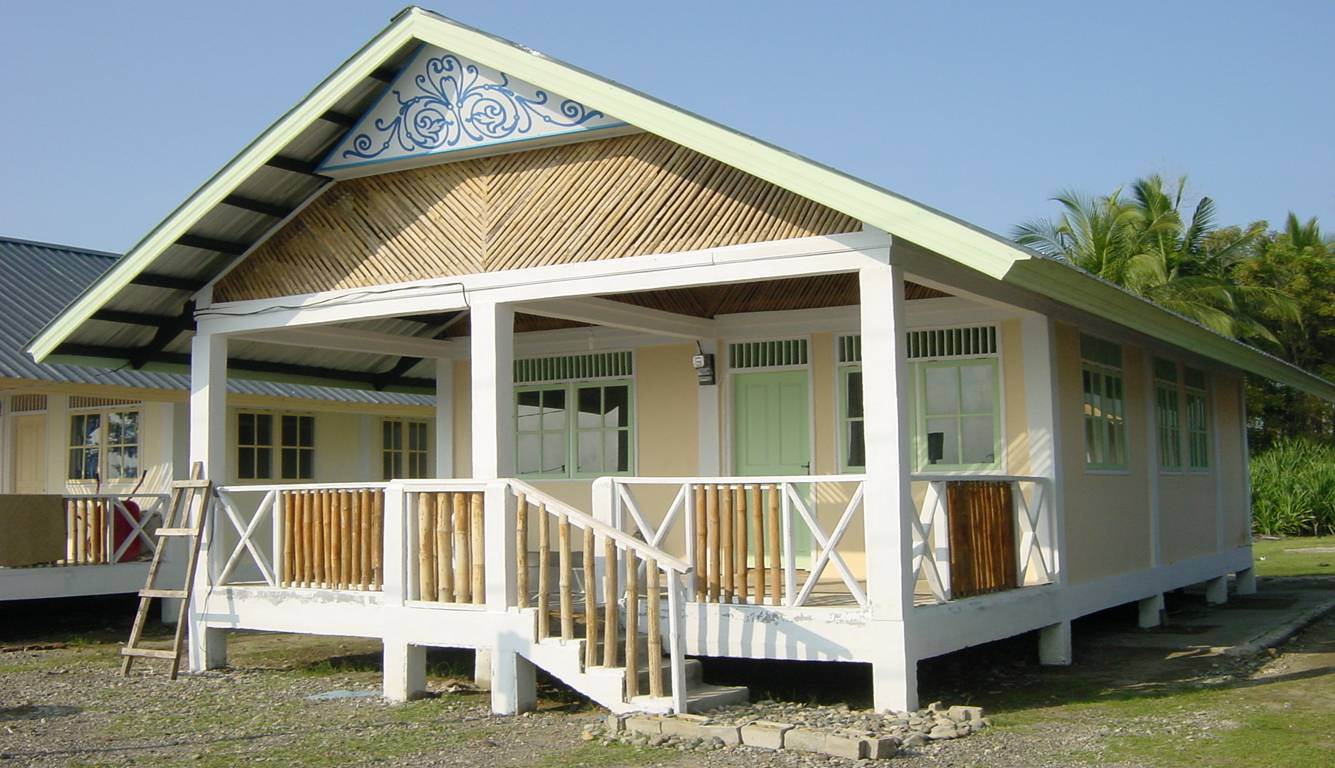
House in Java, Indonesia after tsunami (2004)

- Timor Leste, School Sanitation project, building CVTL Headquarters and Maliana Gymnasium (2010-2011)
- Bangladesh, floods (2004)
- Iran, Earthquake in Bam (2003)
- Afghanistan, Training Workshop in Kabul (2004)
- Indonesia, 2004 tsunami (2004)
- Sri Lanka, 2004 tsunami (2004)
- Thailand, Khao Lak Island (June 2004)
- South Asia, 2004 tsunami (2005)
- Pakistan, 2005 Kashmir earthquake (2005)
- Indonesia, 2006 Yogyakarta earthquake (2006)
- Palestinian territories, reconstruction in Palestinian camps (2009)

Europe

- 2002 European floods (2002)

America

- Grenada Island and Haiti, Hurricane Ivan and Hurricane Jeanne (2004)
- Peru 2007 Peru earthquake (2007)
- Canada, Contribution to the housing of underprivileged people (2007)

Oceania

- Cook Islands Aitutaki, Cyclone Pat (2010)
- Solomon Islands, building school programs (2008) (2009) (2010) and latrine programs (2011)
- Solomon Islands, rebuilding post tsunami/earthquake (2007)
- Australia, construction of a temporary village after bushfires (2009)

== International accreditations and awards ==
The Emergency Architects Foundation has received several awards:

- The French Ministry of Foreign Affairs: contract for actions of international solidarity as an accredited French Foundation. It is now a foundation reconnue d'utilité publique.
- The European Commission: A signed accord with ECHO
- The United Nations: Consultative status with EROSOC and collaborations with agencies UNHabitat, UNDP, UNHCR, UNICEF, WWF, UNOSAT
- Union International Architects: 2008 signed partnership agreement
- EAA is a signed signatory to the ACFID Code of Conduct and became a full member in 2008. EAA has OADG status.

Two international prizes for the Sigli, Indonesia Project:

- 2005 IFI AWARD, for Quality of Project and services to Humanity
- 2006 Sustainable Development Prize from Imerys International

and:

- 2008 Marion Mahony Griffin Prize to Andrea Nield
- 2009 AMO prize: Habitat, Architecture, Environnement, mention initiative
- One of Citations of the World Architecture Community Awards 4th cycle.

== See also ==
- Engineers Without Borders
