= Titi Ogufere =

Nigerian Interior Designer

- Education: Ahmadu Bello University, Dublin Business School
- Occupations: Interior Designer, Media Proprietor, Entrepreneur
- Organization(s): Essential Media Group, Essential Interiors Consultancy
- Known for: Nigerian Interior Design Pioneer, Founder Interior Designers Association of Nigeria, Founder Interior Design Excellence Awards, Founder Made by Design Show, Founder Design Week Lagos, Publisher Essential Interiors Magazine, Essential Traveller Magazine, Essential Woman Magazine
- Children: 1

Titi Ogufere is a Nigerian interior designer, critical design thinker and publisher at Essential Media Group. She is the Creative Director at Essential Interiors Consultancy, a pioneer interior designing company in Nigeria. The award-winning practice was set up in 2002 and has since established an international identity with a wide variety of projects that are context-specific, innovative, experimental, critical and theoretical.

In 2007, Ogufere founded the Interior Designers Association of Nigeria (IDAN), a body charged with the promotion of excellence practices in the interior design sector of Nigeria. She is also the founder of the Essential Media Group, a publishing company that publishes Essential Interior Magazine; a magazine on urban and contemporary interior design.

Ogufere was elected as President-Elect of the International Federation of Interior Architects/Designers (IFI) in 2017. She was announced as the 21st President of the International Federation of Interior Architects/Designers (IFI) on February 27, 2020. Making her the first President of African descent. During her tenure as IFI president, she championed notable advancements in policy and education, during which she co-chaired a taskforce panel responsible for the revision of the IFI Interior and Architecture/Design Education policy

== Early life and education ==
Ogufere was born and raised in Nigeria. She attended Ahmadu Bello University, where she studied Mathematics and Library Science. She went ahead to obtain a degree in Interior Design from Dublin. She thereafter obtained a Diploma in Events Management and PR from Dublin Business School.

She went further to obtain a certificate in Editorial design from London College of Arts.

== Career ==
Ogufere started her career in 2000 at Design Options LTD. In 2002, she founded Essential Interiors, a furniture manufacturing and interdisciplinary practice with operations in Lagos, Nigeria. In 2004, she traveled to Dublin to broaden her education, while she kept her company running in Nigeria. She served as an Ex-Officio Executive Committee member of the International Federation of Interior Architects/Designers (IFI), a position she held for 5 years.

In 2007, Ogufere founded Essential Media Group (EMG); a full-service media company that is into Publishing, Events and Digital Media. EMG publishes three leading magazines, organizes a design festival, two highly specialized exhibitions, two conferences, an awards gala, and has to date published over 27 books including This is Africa: Traditional Design, Modern and Contemporary (2017), In Conversation with Demas Nwoko (2019), Vernacular Design: Redefining the Narrative (2019) and The Devotions of a Virtuous Woman.

In 2017, Ogufere launched the African Culture and Design Festival, an exhibition geared towards showcasing traditional, modern, and contemporary African Art and Design. The event was organized by the Interior Design Association of Nigeria in partnership IFI, with the theme; This is Africa.

In 2019, she launched Design Week Lagos (DWL), an annual event. Design Week Lagos has played host to a number events across the city of Lagos, including; Design Kulture Exhibition, MADE by Design Show, Tourism Investors Forum, Sound for Design, Reflection for Happy Spaces, and Vocational Training Week.

In 2021, she co-produced Made by Design, a Netflix documentary series that focuses on a group of 13 African architects, interior designers, and product designers who live and work in Africa. Three seasons of the show have been produced thus far. The show has spotlighted African professionals in the interior and design space, some of whom are Lami Adeoye, Papa Omotayo, Mpho Vackier, and Issa Diabat,é among others.

In 2012, Ogufere conceived the vision of creating a regional body for African interior architecture/design professional associations, and in 2023, in response to the growing recognition of Africa's rich cultural heritage and its untapped potential in the world of interior architecture and design, the African Council for Interior Architects/Designers (ACIAD) was launched, with George Washington emerging as the first president of the Council.

Titi's latest venture is the Design and Innovation Hub of Nigeria, which is a visionary initiative aimed at steering the nation away from heavy reliance on imported goods and leveraging the untapped creative potential. The initiative aims to train professionals who will change the landscape of furniture, product and industrial design in Nigeria.
