= Selly Raby Kane =

Senegalese fashion designer (born 1987)

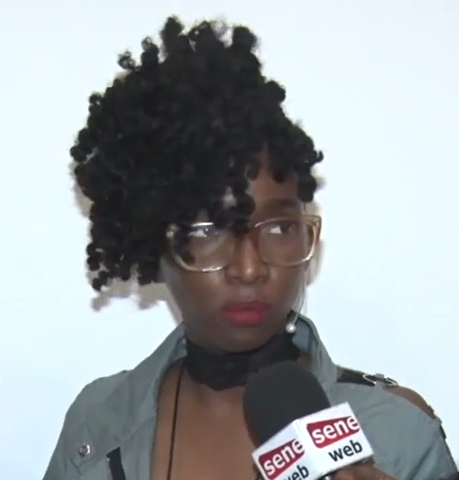
- Kane in 2019
- Born: Dakar, Senegal
- Occupations: Fashion designer, artist

Selly Raby Kane is a Senegalese fashion designer and filmmaker. She is the creator of the fashion brand Seraka (abbreviated SRK). An article in The Economist described her as "Senegal's most famous fashion designer".

== Biography ==
Selly Raby Kane was born in 1987 in Dakar, Senegal, the daughter of a banker and civil servant. Kane was educated at Catholic schools until moving to study Business Administration and Law at university in France. However, she was dissatisfied with her career plans, taking a break from university in 2008. In 2009, she enrolled in the fashion school MOD'SPE Paris. After completing her studies in 2011 and living in the United States, she returned to Dakar. In that time, she became part of the art collectives Muus du Tux and Les Petits Pierres.

Kane officially released her first clothing collection in 2012, though she says she had worked on it discreetly since 2008. Her profile was increased when Beyoncé wore one of her garments in 2016. She opened a boutique in Dakar in February 2017, and a showroom in the city later that year. She was commissioned by IKEA to create homeware for their 2019 flagship collection.

Kane has said that Dakar is a central inspiration for her designs. She has called her past work "Afrofuturist"; it has also been described as "avant-garde", "post-colonialist", and "Afropolitan".

In 2017, Kane released a virtual reality short film The Other Dakar, shown on the international film circuit. She also served as writer, director, and stylist for the dystopian short film Jant Yi (2021).
