= Robina Hospital =

Coordinates: 28°04′15.73″S 153°22′33.38″E

- Queensland Health
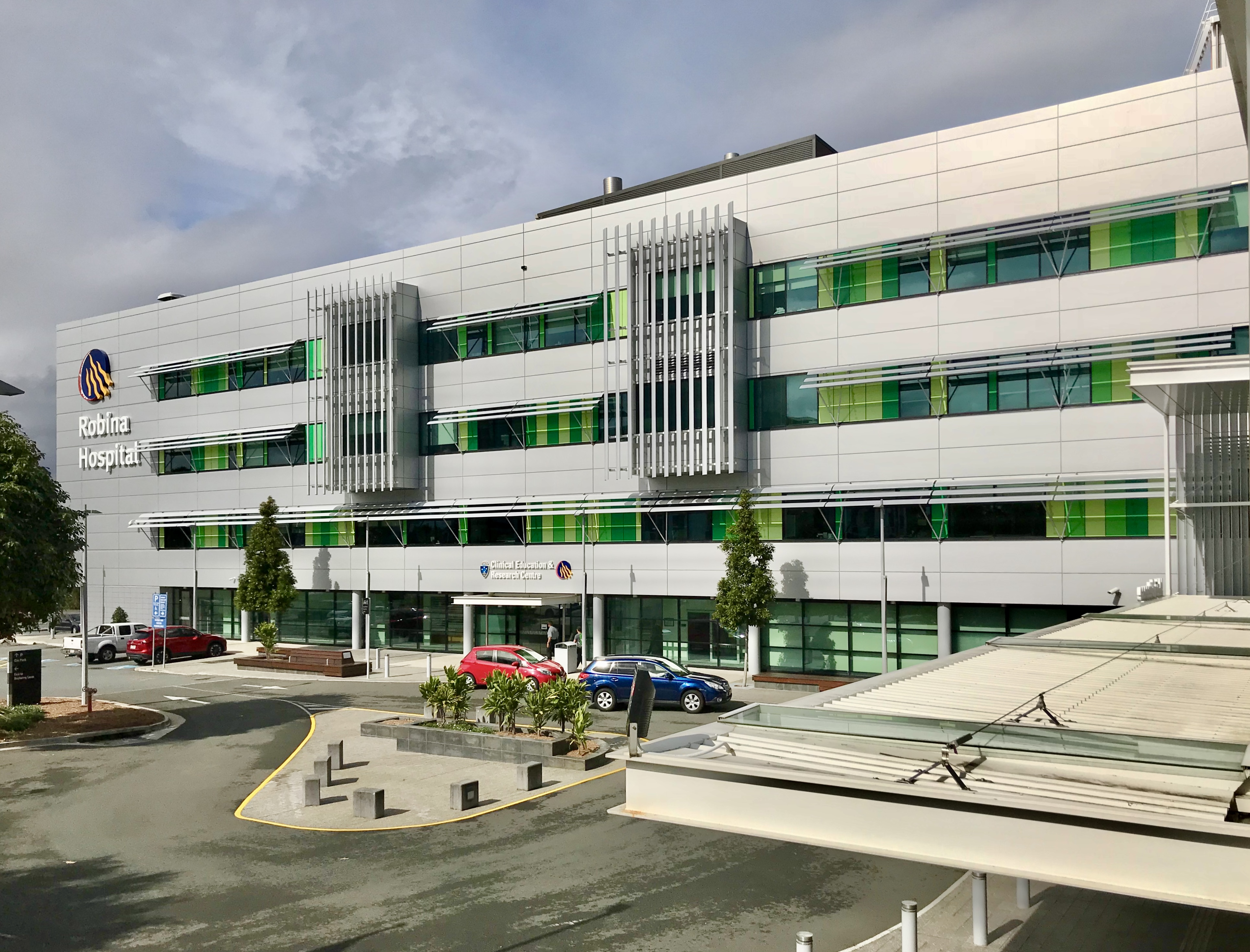

Geography
- Location: 2 Bayberry Lane, Robina, Gold Coast, Queensland, Australia

Organisation
- Care system: Medicare
- Type: Teaching
- Affiliated university: Bond University, Griffith University

Services
- Emergency department: Yes
- Beds: 403

History
- Founded: 2000

Links
- Website: Official Website

Robina Hospital is a large public hospital servicing the southern suburbs of the Gold Coast, Queensland, Australia. Located in the Robina CBD, it is a teaching hospital for Bond University and Griffith University.

== Location ==
The Robina Hospital is located at 2 Bayberry Lane in the suburb of Robina. Pacific Motorway (M1) exit 79 is only a short drive from the hospital entrance. A multi-story car park for visitors and patients is provided.

=== Public transport ===
Located adjacent to the hospital is Robina railway station, providing train and bus connections. Trains run typically every 30 minutes, travelling to the northern suburbs of the city as well as to Brisbane. Kinetic Gold Coast run bus services to the surrounding suburbs.

== History ==
Robina Hospital was originally built as a private hospital in 2000, offering some public services. In 2002, the Queensland Government purchased the hospital.

The $42 million Stage One Hospital expansion was completed in September 2007 delivering 25 beds and a new emergency department, intensive care and coronary care unit, expanded renal services and increased pathology, radiology, pharmacy, and medical records departments.

The $287.7 million Stage Two and Three expansion delivered an extra 154 new beds transforming it into a 364-bed teaching hospital. Baulderstone was awarded the expansion project which included major new works, construction in two of the hospital wings and refurbishment of the existing hospital building. The main works were completed in late 2010 and completion of refurbishment works in early 2012.
