= Tosin Oshinowo =

Nigerian architect, designer, and curator

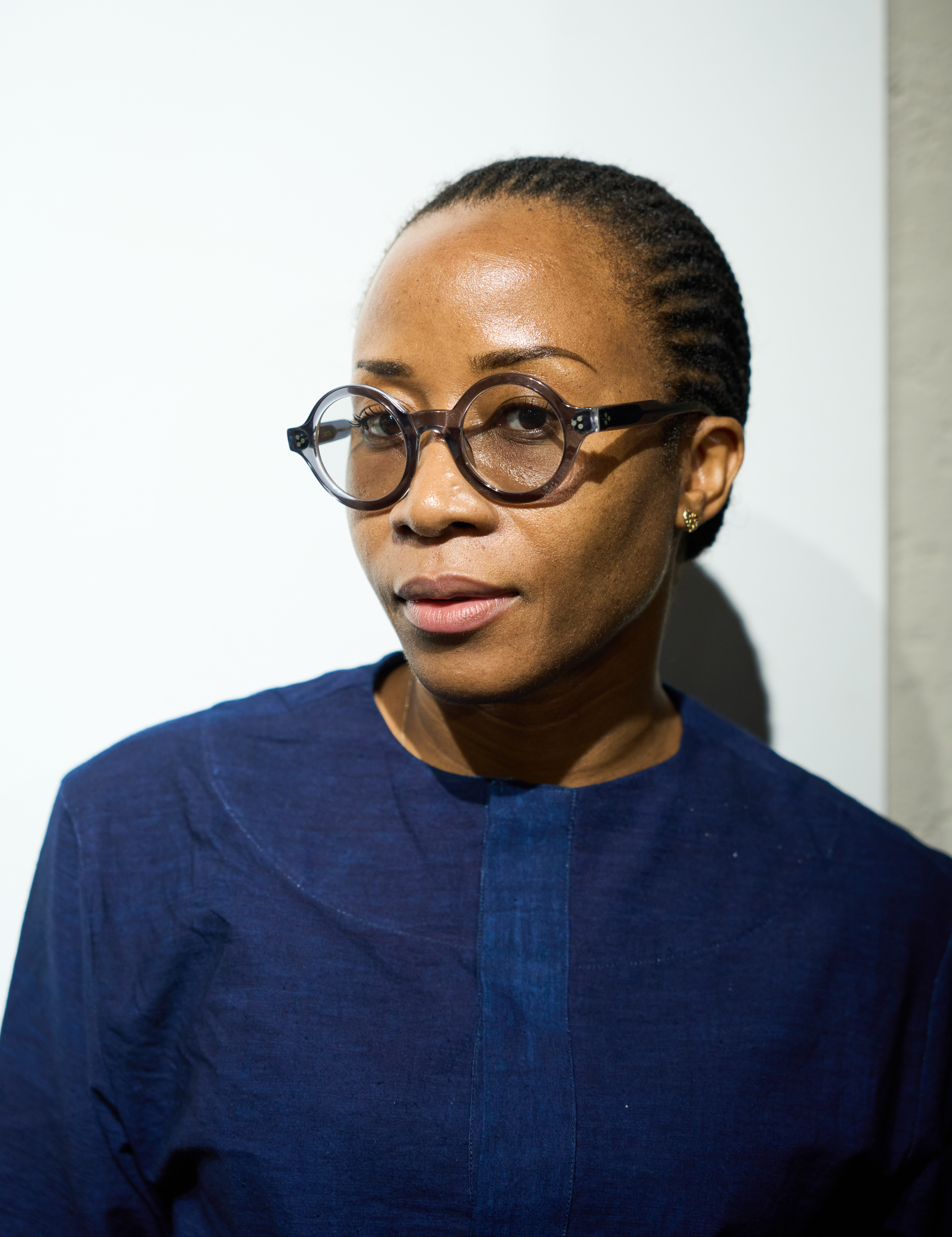
- Portrait of Tosin Oshinowo
- Born: Nigeria
- Education: Architectural Association School of Architecture; University College London
- Occupations: Architect, designer, curator, author
- Awards: Monocle Design Awards (2024); Special Mention, 19th Venice Architecture Biennale (2025)
- Practice: Oshinowo Studio (formerly cmDesign Atelier)
- Buildings: Maryland Mall, Lagos; Rebuilding Ngarannam, Borno State; Freetown Carrier Corps Memorial
- Projects: Ilé-Ilà furniture line
- Website: oshinowostudio.com

Tosin Oshinowo is a Nigerian architect, designer and curator based in Lagos. She is the founder and principal of Oshinowo Studio (formerly cmDesign Atelier, or cmD+A), an architecture and design practice established in Lagos, and founder of the furniture line Ilé-Ilà. She has also worked as a public speaker and author.

Her principal projects include Maryland Mall in Lagos, the masterplan for Rebuilding Ngarannam, a settlement in Borno State for a community displaced by Boko Haram and developed with the United Nations Development Programme (UNDP), and a memorial in Freetown to the Sierra Leone Carrier Corps, commissioned by the Commonwealth War Graves Commission (CWGC). She curated the 2023 Sharjah Architecture Triennial, co-curated the 2019 Lagos Biennial, and was a member of the Loeb Fellowship class of 2025 at the Harvard Graduate School of Design. In 2025 the jury of the 19th Venice Biennale of Architecture awarded a special mention to her installation Alternative Urbanism: The Self-Organised Markets of Lagos.

== Early life and education ==
Oshinowo was born in Nigeria. She has stated that accompanying her father to the construction site of his retirement home during her childhood contributed to her interest in architecture. A further account records that she became interested in the profession through building plans her father brought home while she was in secondary school. One profile states that she grew up between the United Kingdom and Lagos.

She trained as an architect in London. She attended the Architectural Association School of Architecture, from which she holds the AA Postgraduate Diploma, and holds a master's degree in urban design from The Bartlett, University College London. Other biographical material lists a master's degree in development and planning (building and urban design in development), a bachelor's degree in architecture from Kingston University, London and a master's degree in business for architecture and design from IE University, Madrid.

She is a registered architect in Nigeria and a member of the Nigerian Institute of Architects and the Royal Institute of British Architects (RIBA).

== Career ==
=== Early career ===
Oshinowo worked at Skidmore, Owings & Merrill in London from June to October 2007. From January 2008 to January 2009 she worked at the Office for Metropolitan Architecture in Rotterdam, where she was part of a team of six that designed a proposed double-decker Fourth Mainland Bridge intended to link Ajah and Ikorodu in Lagos State.

She returned to Nigeria in January 2009 and joined James Cubitt Architects, where she remained for four years. There she was lead architect on projects for Nigeria LNG, including the masterplan and corporate head office in Port Harcourt.

=== cmDesign Atelier and Oshinowo Studio ===
After leaving James Cubitt Architects, Oshinowo established her own practice, cmDesign Atelier (cmD+A), in Lagos. Contemporary press sources give the year of founding as 2012, whereas the practice, later renamed Oshinowo Studio, gives 2013. She was team lead for the design of Maryland Mall, a commercial development in Ikeja that opened in June 2016. The practice's other work has included residential projects on the Lagos coast and the West African flagship store for Adidas.

==== Rebuilding Ngarannam ====
Ngarannam, in Mafa Local Government Area of Borno State, was largely destroyed in 2015 during the Boko Haram insurgency. The Nigerian federal and Borno State governments, with support from the UNDP, undertook its reconstruction, and Oshinowo was responsible for the design. The design was informed by consultations with residents. The masterplan is organised radially, with a school, clinic and marketplace at its centre and approximately 500 houses around them. The settlement reopened in October 2022; 20 per cent of the homes were allocated to households headed by single or widowed women. According to Dezeen, the project was intended as a prototype for the reconstruction of other communities affected by the insurgency.

==== Freetown Carrier Corps Memorial ====
In May 2025, Oshinowo Studio presented its design for a memorial to the Sierra Leone Carrier Corps of the First World War, commissioned by the CWGC. The design adds etched glass screens to the existing Freetown Memorial of 1930, designed by Edwin Lutyens; the screens bear the names of 946 members of the Carrier Corps, and four satellite sites are planned in provinces from which men were recruited. ArchDaily reported that Oshinowo was the first woman and the first West African architect to design a memorial for the CWGC. The CWGC issued a tender for construction of the memorial in August 2025.

==== Alternative Urbanism ====
In 2025, Oshinowo Studio presented Alternative Urbanism: The Self-Organised Markets of Lagos in the main exhibition of the 19th Venice Architecture Biennale, curated by Carlo Ratti. The installation documents three Lagos markets – Computer Village, Katangua and Ladipo – through film, photography and data, and examines their informal systems of reuse and repair. The Biennale jury awarded it one of its special mentions. The work was also shown at the 2025 Chicago Architecture Biennial.

=== Ilé-Ilà ===
In 2017 Oshinowo founded Ilé-Ilà (Yoruba for "House of Lines"), a furniture line whose output is centred on chair design, made to order and handmade in Lagos. The collections are characterised by bright colour and the use of Nigerian teak and traditional West African textiles such as aso oke; Oshinowo has contrasted this with the more restrained palette of her architecture. The line includes the Àdùnní chair, a name meaning "daughter of the sweet one" in Yoruba. Campaigns for the brand have featured the Nigerian entertainers Adekunle Gold and Chidinma. The line has been sold internationally through retailers including 54kibo and 1stDibs, and was exhibited at Homo Faber in Venice in 2022. It has been covered in publications including The Financial Times Weekender (April 2023), Grazia (June 2020), Elle Decor (January 2020) and Harper's Bazaar (April 2018).

=== Design collaborations ===
In 2020 Oshinowo and the British-Ghanaian textile designer Chrissa Amuah produced Freedom to Move, a conceptual project for Lexus presented in association with Design Miami. It consisted of three mixed-media headpieces and was released through a digital presentation and a documentary series.

=== Curatorial work ===
Year	Event	Role
2019	Lagos Biennial II, How to Build a Lagoon with Just a Bottle of Wine?	Co-curator, with Antawan I. Byrd and Oyindamola Fakeye
2023–24	Sharjah Architecture Triennial 2023, The Beauty of Impermanence: An Architecture of Adaptability	Curator

The second Lagos Biennial was held at Independence House on Lagos Island in 2019. Its title was adapted from the poem "A Song for Lagos" by Akeem Lasisi.

The Sharjah Architecture Triennial ran from 11 November 2023 to 10 March 2024. Its theme was the reuse, adaptation and innovation arising from conditions of scarcity in the Global South. It included contributions from 29 architects, designers and studios from 25 countries.

=== Writing and lectures ===
Oshinowo has written on urbanism, African modernism, design and identity. From 2017 she contributed a column, "The Afromodernist: Identity, Architecture & Sexuality", to Omenka Online. Her writing is also reported to have appeared in Expansions, a publication accompanying the 2021 Venice Architecture Biennale, and in the catalogue of the 2023 edition, and she is recorded as a speaker at TEDxPortHarcourt in November 2017. Her lectures include a keynote at Melbourne Design Week in 2024, presented by the Robin Boyd Foundation and the National Gallery of Victoria, and a 2025 lecture at the University of Toronto's Daniels Faculty.

=== Sho-n-Tell ===
From 2009 to 2014 Oshinowo convened Sho-n-Tell, an annual series in which undergraduate and postgraduate students of the University of Lagos shared studio space with practising professionals.

=== Other activities ===
In 2019 Oshinowo was featured in the Polaris series of the Visual Collaborative electronic catalogue. In January 2018 she joined the board of the Lagos Theatre Festival, organised with the British Council.

== Recognition ==
=== Awards and honours ===
- Architect of the Year, 3rd City People Real Estate Awards (2017)
- Lord's Achievers Awards for Creativity (2019)
- Finalist, Diversity in Architecture (DIVIA) Award (2023)
- Included in the Architectural Digest AD100 list for the Middle East
- Included in Dezeen's list of the 50 most powerful women in architecture and design (2024)
- Shortlisted for Architect of the Year, Dezeen Awards (2024)
- Top Architect for Community, Monocle Design Awards (2024)
- Included in the Elle Decor A-List (2025)
- Special Mention, 19th Venice Architecture Biennale, for Alternative Urbanism: The Self-Organised Markets of Lagos (2025)

=== Fellowships and affiliations ===
In May 2024 the Harvard Graduate School of Design announced Oshinowo as a member of its Loeb Fellowship class of 2025. She is also listed as an Honorary Fellow of the Royal Architectural Institute of Canada.

=== Juries and advisory roles ===
Oshinowo served as a judge for the Dezeen Awards in 2022 and is listed as an expert by the Holcim Foundation.

== Selected works ==
Work	Location	Year	Notes
Maryland Mall	Ikeja, Lagos	2016	Commercial development by cmD+A
Rebuilding Ngarannam	Mafa LGA, Borno State	2022	Masterplan and approximately 500 houses, with the UNDP
Ilé-Ilà furniture collections	Lagos	2017–present	Includes the Àdùnní chair
Freedom to Move (with Chrissa Amuah)	Design Miami	2020	Conceptual design for Lexus
Freetown Carrier Corps Memorial	Freetown, Sierra Leone	2025 (design)	Commissioned by the CWGC
Alternative Urbanism	Venice; Chicago	2025	Exhibition installation
