= Northern Territory Government Architect =

The Northern Territory Government Architect, an appointed officer of the Government of Northern Territory, who works as an adviser to the government and assist government to achieve its urban development objectives of improving the built environment of the Northern Territory. He serves on various committees and boards in relation to heritage protection, urban architecture, and design. The Government Architect reports directly to the Chief Minister of the Northern Territory.

The first appointed officer to the role was Bob Nation. He was principally involved with the Darwin Waterfront Project from 2004 to 2009.

In March 2013 professor Lawrence Nield was appointed to the role. During the announcement, the Northern Territory Minister for Lands, Planning and the Environment, Peter Chandler, said:

"Professor Nield is an advocate for building better cities and adopts an environmental approach to architecture and planning. One of his special interests is the design of public buildings and creating masterplans for the design of cities and campuses. He is also raising awareness for ventilation in city streets to reduce temperatures, something that is well suited to the Territory climate".
