= International Federation of Interior Architects/Designers =

International organisation

- Abbreviation: IFI
- Formation: September 20, 1963; 63 years ago
- Founded at: Denmark
- Headquarters: New York City, New York, U.S.
- Website: ifiworld.org

The International Federation of Interior Architects/Designers (IFI) represents professional interior architects and interior designers. Founded in Copenhagen, Denmark on September 20, 1963 as a not-for-profit, limited liability company to unite the profession and act as a forum for interior design issues, IFI is an associations' association, serving on the global level a membership of some thirty national organizations, and representing by 2015, 270,000 designers, educators and industrialists in 110 countries.

During the 1980s, IFI worked with the International Council of Societies of Industrial Design (ICSID) and the International Council of Graphic Design Associations (ICOGRADA) particularly to design furniture and packaging for rural health clinics in less developed parts of the world. Since 2008, IFI has been a member of the International Design Alliance (IDA) together with ICSID and ICOGRADA and hold joint meetings biannually. This alliance focuses on opportunities to further the design discipline based on multidisciplinary collaboration.

On February 17–18, 2011, IFI held a symposium in New York, USA, as part of their Design Frontiers: The Interiors Entity initiative. On this occasion, the world's first 'Interiors Declaration' was developed and signed by a delegation of 100 interior architecture/design professionals, educators, heads of design associations, manufacturers and related stakeholders. The Declaration has been adopted by 114 cities around the world including New York, Singapore, Hong Kong, Montreal, Kuala Lumpur, Sydney, Melbourne, and Gwangju.

IFI held its 28th international congress at the Eko Convention Centre on Victoria Island, Lagos in November 2017, hosted by the Interior Designers Association of Nigeria.

The IFI secretariat has previously been located in Amsterdam, Johannesburg, Seoul, and Singapore, and is now located in New York City.
