= Creswick =

- Town
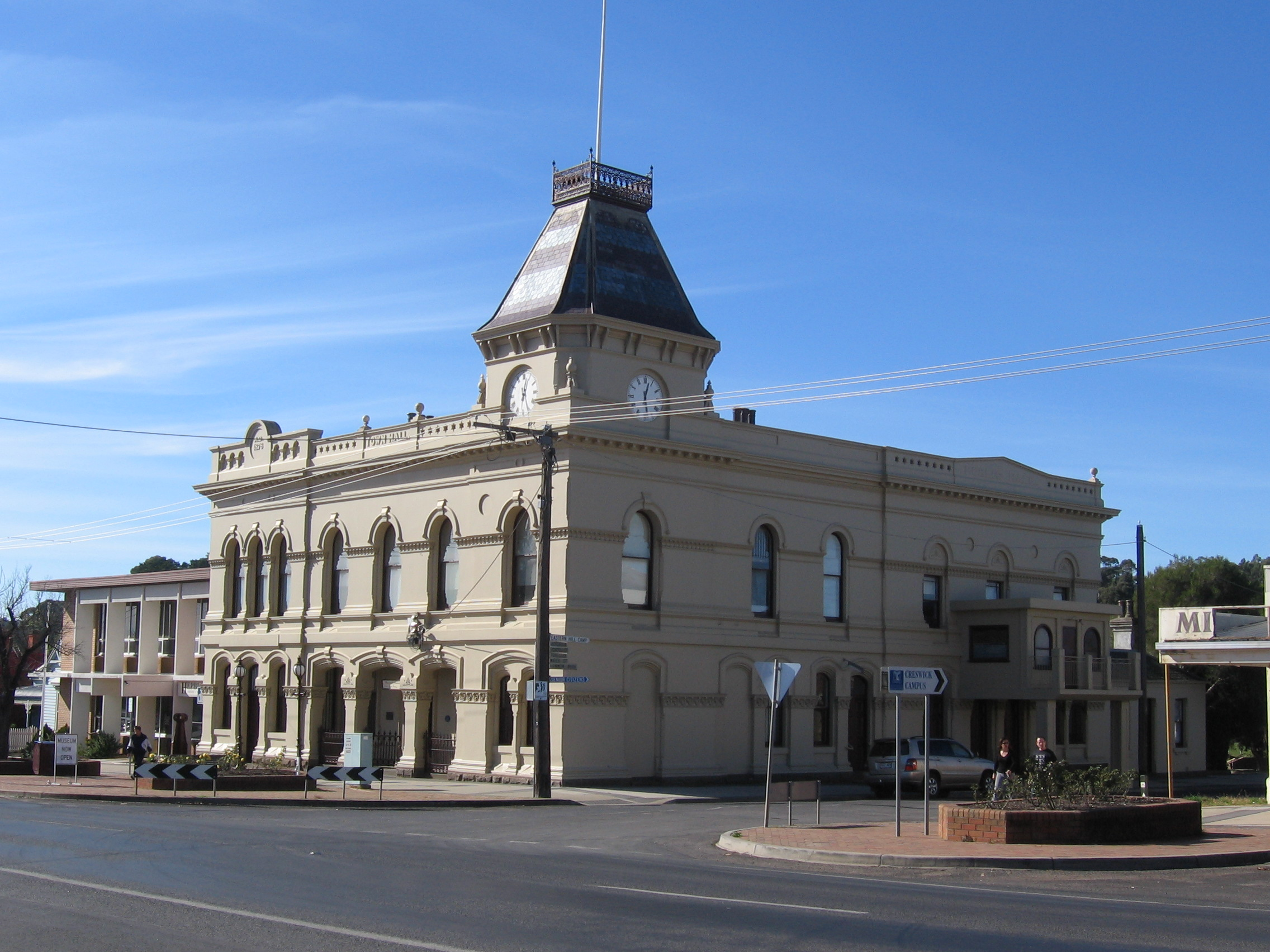
- Town hall and museum

- Coordinates: 37°25′30″S 143°53′30″E
- Country: Australia
- State: Victoria
- LGA: Shire of Hepburn
- Location: 122 km (76 mi) NW of Melbourne; 18 km (11 mi) N of Ballarat

Government
  - State electorate: Ripon
  - Federal division: Ballarat
- Elevation: 430 m (1,410 ft)

Population
  - Total: 3,170 (2016 census)
- Postcode: 3363
- Mean max temp: 17.8 °C (64.0 °F)
- Mean min temp: 6.6 °C (43.9 °F)
- Annual rainfall: 742.7 mm (29.24 in)

Creswick /ˈkrɛzwɪk/ is a town in west-central Victoria, Australia, 18 kilometres north of Ballarat and 122 kilometres northwest of Melbourne, in the Shire of Hepburn. It is 430 metres above sea level. At the 2016 census, Creswick had a population of 3,170. Creswick was named after the Creswick family, the pioneer settlers of the region.

== History ==
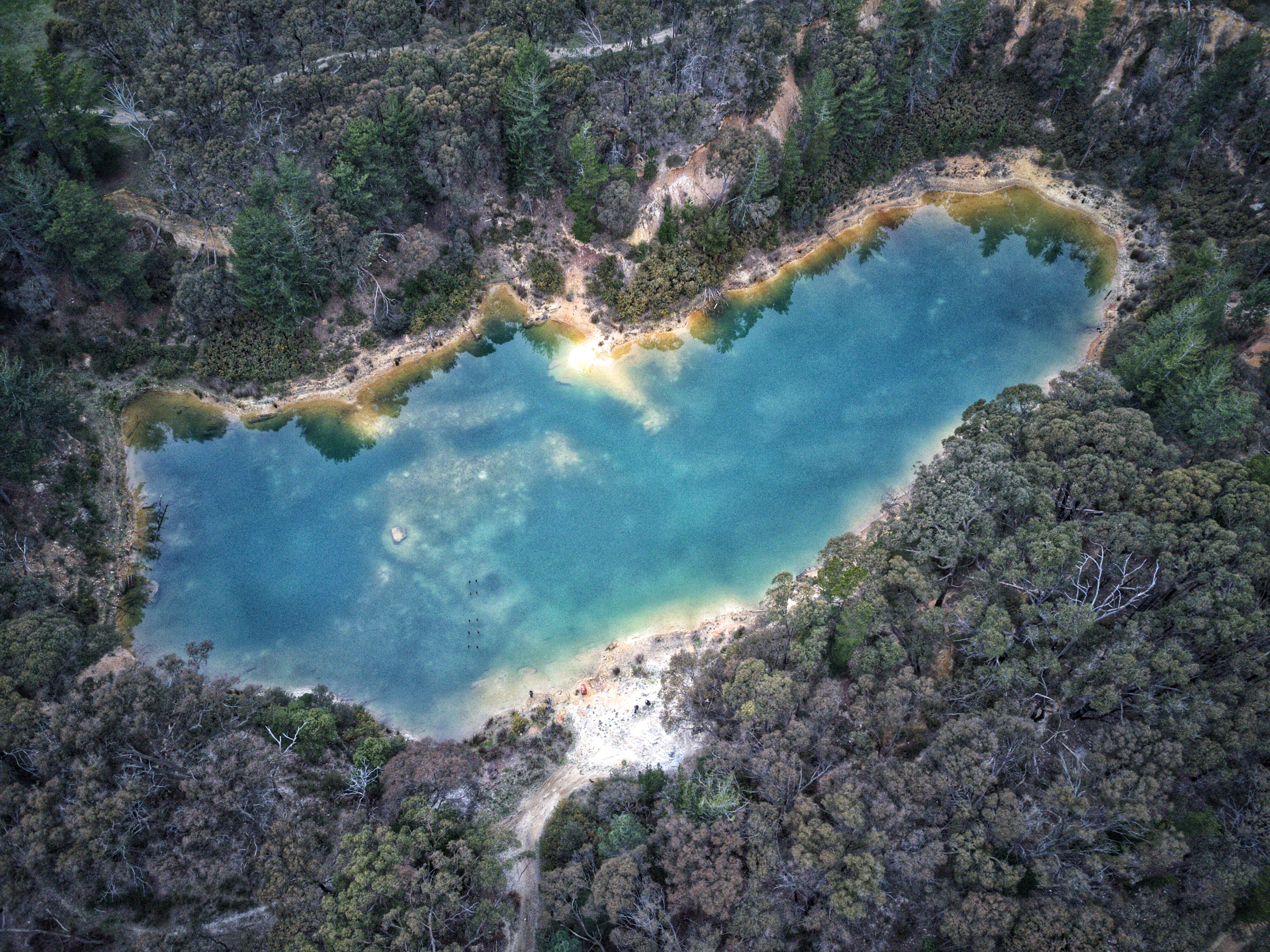
The iridescent blue of Creswick's Blue Waters lake: a former open cut mine that has been converted into a bush camping and 4WD enthusiast playground, September 2018

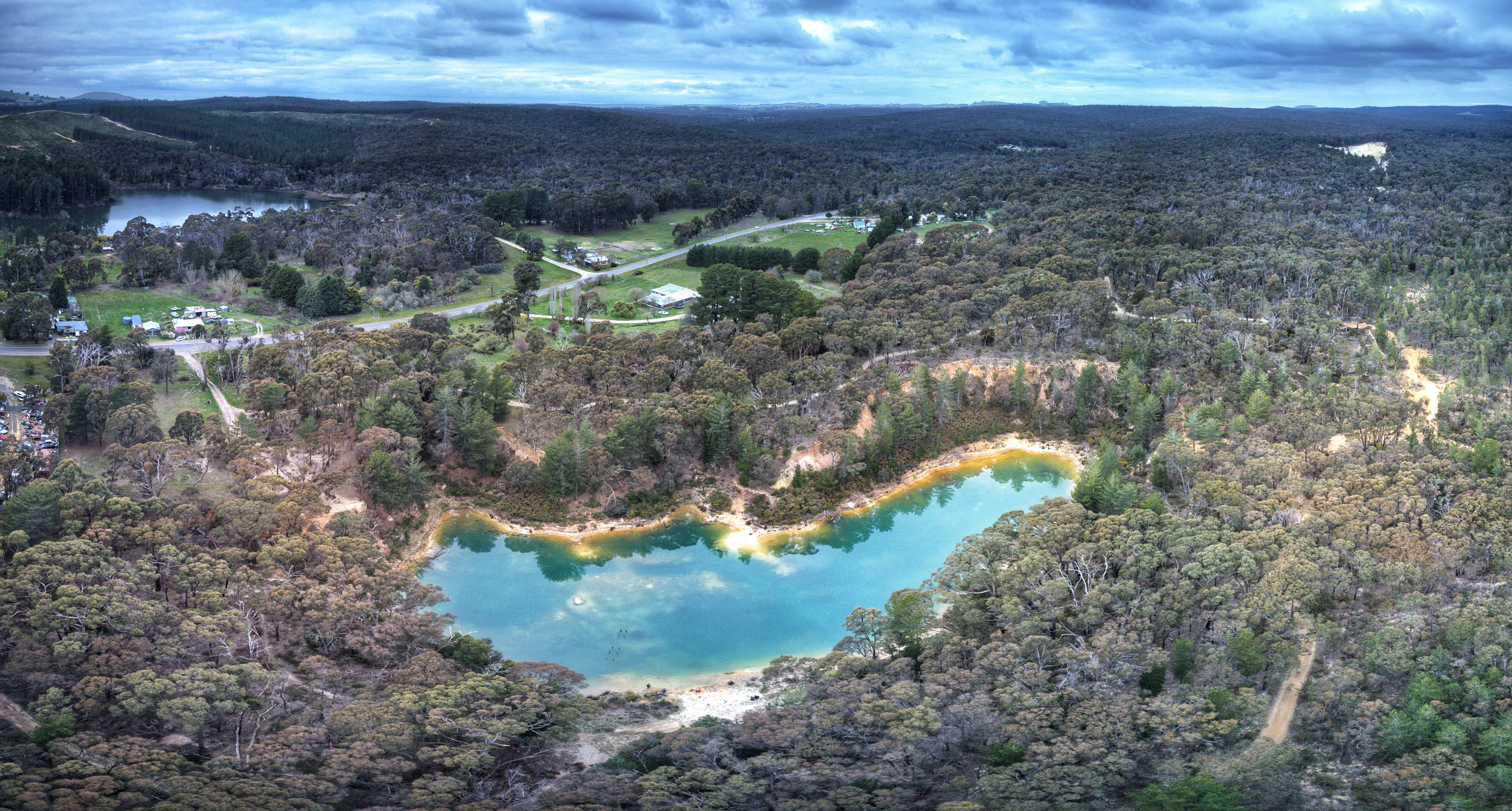
Aerial panorama of Blue Waters lake in Creswick, September 2018

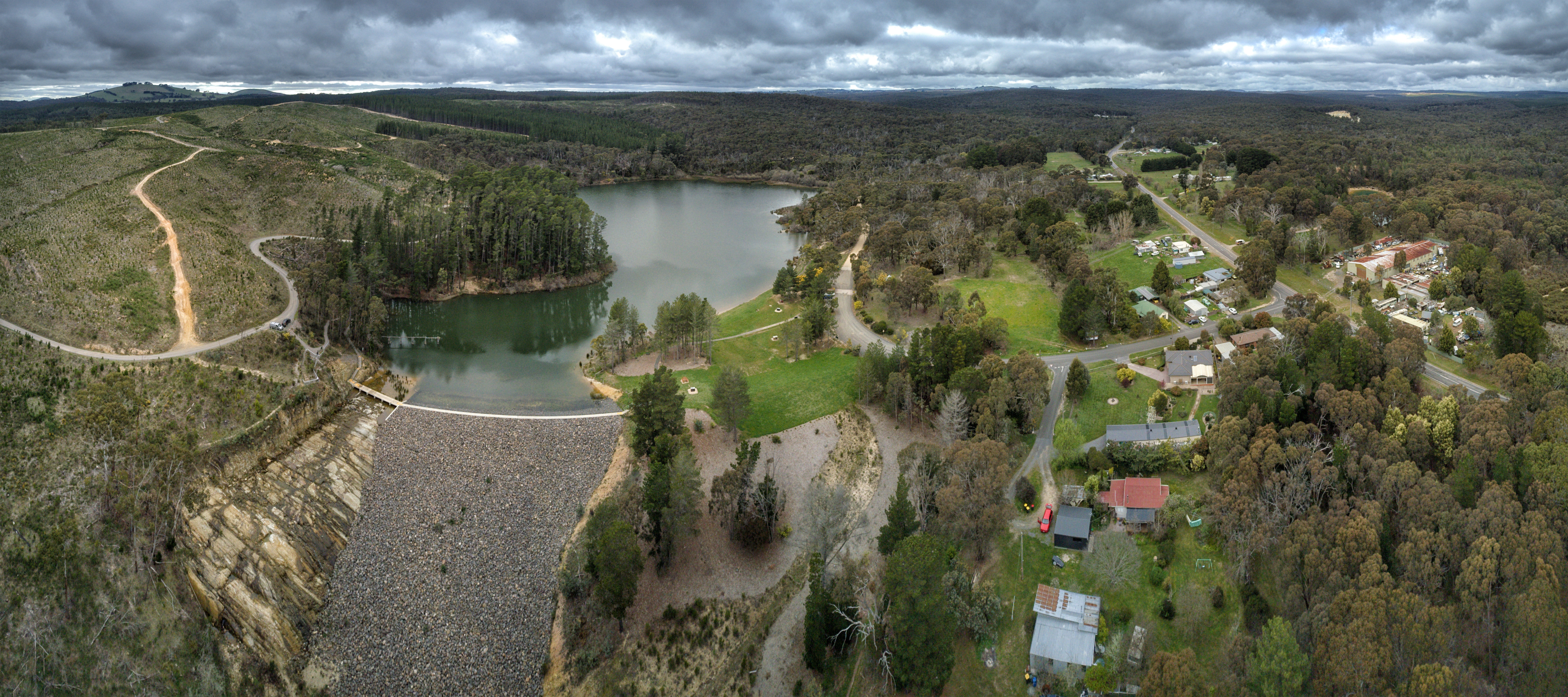
Aerial perspective of St Georges Lake in Creswick, September 2018

The area was inhabited by the Aboriginal Dja Dja Wurrung people before European settlement. The pioneer white settlers were Henry, Charles and John Creswick, three brothers who started a large sheep station in 1842.

Creswick is a former gold-mining town, established during the Victorian gold rushes in the 1850s. The Post Office opened in September 1854. It was named Creswick's Creek until around 1857. The population reached a peak of 25,000 during the gold rush. Today, local industries include forestry, grazing and agriculture.

Creswick was the site of the New Australasian Gold Mine disaster on 12 December 1882, Australia's worst mining disaster in which 22 men drowned.

The Creswick Magistrates' Court closed in January 1983, not having been visited by a Magistrate since 1976.

Creswick was used as a filming location for the 2004 American television miniseries adaptation of Stephen King's Salem's Lot, which starred Rob Lowe, Donald Sutherland, Rutger Hauer and James Cromwell. Most of the supporting cast, including Robert Mammone, Tara Morice, Robert Grubb, Steven Vidler, Penny McNamee, and Elizabeth Alexander, were Australian actors.

== The town today ==
The original Victorian School of Forestry was founded by the Department of Forestry in 1910 and it was the first forestry training establishment in Victoria. The Water Street campus now provides the base for the School of Forest and Ecosystem Science which is an integrated part of the University of Melbourne.

Creswick has three primary schools—two government and one Catholic: Creswick Primary School, Creswick North Primary School and St Augustine's Primary School respectively.

Creswick has an aged care facility. John Curtin Aged Care was formerly the township's health care hospital, but was converted to a nursing home in 1998.

== Features ==
=== Attractions ===
The town includes the Creswick Men's Friendship Shed, affiliated with the national Australia's network of men's sheds. Creswick's branch maintains that it is one of the longest continuously-running men's shed in Australia. Launched in 2001, the shed currently is located at 15 Bridge Street Creswick, adjacent to Park Lake.

The shed primarily operates on Tuesdays and is used temporarily running a Woman's Group on Wednesdays. The shed maintains a partnership with the Creswick Hospital and Community Health Centre.

A former attraction was the Creswick Bazaar (later rebranded as the Creswick Town Hall Market). It was held on the third Saturday and Sunday of the month at the historic railway precinct in Raglan Street, showcasing crafts made by local residents. The railway station location was notable in that the station was restored by a group of volunteers. The market ceased activities due to shutdowns during the COVID-19 pandemic and was not restored after the pandemic ended.

The Creswick Market is located at Creswick Neighbourhood Centre on Victoria Street and held the third Saturday of every month from 9:00 am to 1:00 pm. The Creswick Market features amenities such as free live music; kids' entertainment and playground; beautiful gardens to relax in; freshly made delicacies and great coffee; hand-made arts, crafts, jewellery and clothes; homegrown fruit, vegetables and plants; over 90 specialist boutique sites. In 2024, the market was reported to have received the highest rate of five-star reviews among farmer's markets in Australia on Tripadvisor, at 72.8 per cent

The Creswick Woollen Mills, established in 1947, is the last remaining coloured spinning mill of its kind in Australia, still owned and run by the founder's family. It produces natural fibre products such as woollen blankets, throws and accessories. The mill is open seven days a week and operates a self-guided tour and shop.

The Creswick Museum is situated at two addresses. The museum in the old Creswick Town Hall is open weekends and public holidays from 11am until 3.30pm. The Research Centre, operating out of the former Infant Child Centre, is open Friday and Saturday 11am to 3.00pm.

Creswick has a range of singletrack trails suitable for both mountain biking and trail running. The Annual Brackenbury Mountain Bike Challenge in November attracts participants from across Australia. These trails were identified as a venue for Mountain biking during the 2026 Commonwealth Games that was ultimately postponed.

The iridescent blue of Creswick's Blue Waters lake is a draw for photography enthusiasts. The former open cut mine is located within Creswick Regional park, off Melbourne Road and just minutes from the town centre.

=== Sport ===
- The Creswick Bowling Club, which was originally situated in the middle of town, has since relocated to the Lindsay Park complex after several flooding incidents in late 2010 and early 2011, offers lawn bowling for women and men during the spring, summer and autumn months.
- The town has an Australian Rules football team competing in the Central Highlands Football League.
- Golfers play at The RACV Resort on the Midland Highway. The Forest Resort is a multi-storied building that is used for vacationing and conferences. It also has a gymnasium, heated pool, spa, library and health spa on the top floor.
- The Creswick Imperials cricket club play home games at Doug Lindsay recreational reserve. The A grade and A reserve teams play in the Maryborough & District Cricket Association whilst arguably their most popular team will compete in the Ballarat Cricket Association one day B grade competition for the 2016/17 season after having convincingly triumphed in the C grade in 2015/16.

== Notable people ==
Creswick is the birthplace of the Lindsays, perhaps Australia's best known art family. Famous Lindsays (in birth order) were Percy Lindsay (landscape painter), Sir Lionel Lindsay (printmaker, painter and critic), Norman Lindsay (painter, sculptor and writer), Ruby Lindsay (illustrator) and Sir Daryl Lindsay (painter and arts administrator). Percy Lindsay painted many landscapes of Creswick. Norman Lindsay immortalised Creswick in his 1930 novel Redheap, a work that was banned for many years.

Other famous Creswickians include John Curtin, Australia's Prime Minister during World War II; Sir Alexander Peacock, a Victorian Premier; Sir Hayden Starke, a Justice of the High Court; and early trade unionists William Spence and David Temple, co-founders of the Australian Shearers' Union and Amalgamated Shearers' Union, which evolved into the Australian Workers' Union.

== Transport ==
Creswick is located on the Midland Highway. Creswick railway station is served by V/Line train services to and from Maryborough, as well as buses from Ballarat operated by CDC Ballarat.

== Climate ==
Climate data for Creswick, elevation 424 m (1,391 ft)
Month	Jan	Feb	Mar	Apr	May	Jun	Jul	Aug	Sep	Oct	Nov	Dec	Year
Record high °C (°F)	41.7 (107.1)	40.8 (105.4)	37.5 (99.5)	29.8 (85.6)	24.3 (75.7)	18.8 (65.8)	19.5 (67.1)	20.7 (69.3)	25.9 (78.6)	31.9 (89.4)	35.7 (96.3)	36.9 (98.4)	41.7 (107.1)
Mean daily maximum °C (°F)	26.9 (80.4)	26.3 (79.3)	23.5 (74.3)	18.2 (64.8)	13.6 (56.5)	11.3 (52.3)	10.3 (50.5)	11.2 (52.2)	14.1 (57.4)	17.2 (63.0)	19.6 (67.3)	23.2 (73.8)	17.9 (64.2)
Mean daily minimum °C (°F)	11.0 (51.8)	11.9 (53.4)	9.8 (49.6)	7.0 (44.6)	5.2 (41.4)	2.9 (37.2)	2.4 (36.3)	2.7 (36.9)	4.2 (39.6)	6.0 (42.8)	7.0 (44.6)	9.0 (48.2)	6.6 (43.9)
Record low °C (°F)	2.2 (36.0)	2.2 (36.0)	−0.5 (31.1)	−1.3 (29.7)	−2.5 (27.5)	−4.4 (24.1)	−3.7 (25.3)	−3.6 (25.5)	−2.8 (27.0)	−2.4 (27.7)	1.0 (33.8)	1.7 (35.1)	−4.4 (24.1)
Average rainfall mm (inches)	48.2 (1.90)	43.2 (1.70)	37.9 (1.49)	54.8 (2.16)	74.5 (2.93)	70.4 (2.77)	77.3 (3.04)	88.0 (3.46)	73.4 (2.89)	77.7 (3.06)	59.9 (2.36)	46.9 (1.85)	750.1 (29.53)
Average rainy days (≥ 1.0 mm)	4.5	4.1	5.1	7.7	11.0	11.6	13.6	14.5	11.3	10.6	8.3	6.6	108.9
Source: Australian Bureau of Meteorology
