= Frank Lundie =

Australian trade unionist

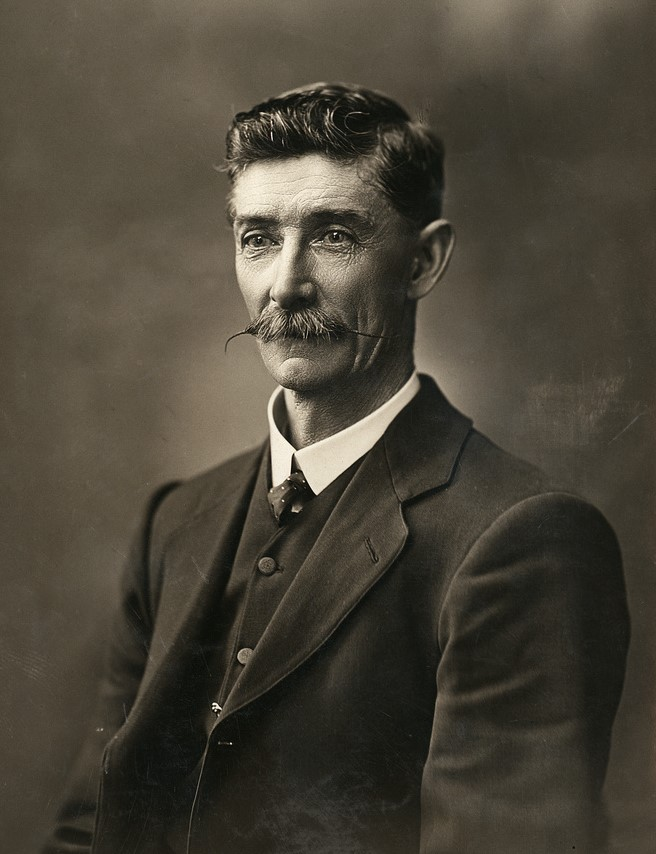
- Lundie, c. 1905

President of the Australian Workers' Union
- In office 1917–1919
- Preceded by: William Spence
- Succeeded by: Arthur Blakeley

Secretary of the South Australian branch of the Australian Workers' Union
- In office 1900–1933

Member of the Port Adelaide City Council
- In office 1900–1909

Member of the Adelaide City Council
- In office 1909–1931

Personal details
- Born: Francis Walter Lundie; March 1, 1866 Portland Estate, South Australia
- Died: July 13, 1933 (aged 67) Adelaide, South Australia
- Resting place: West Terrace Cemetery, Adelaide
- Party: United Labor Party
- Spouses: Elizabeth Margaret Battens Armstrong (m. 1891; died 1907) Edith Mary Armstrong (m. 1909)
- Children: 12 (seven daughters, five sons)
- Parent(s): John Lundie (father); Mary Ann Josephine Moran (mother)
- Education: Port Adelaide and Morgan public schools
- Occupation: Trade unionist

Francis Walter Lundie (1 March 1866 – 13 July 1933) was an Australian trade unionist, long serving Councillor for Port Adelaide and the corporation of the city of Adelaide, board member of the Royal Adelaide Hospital, the Royal Zoological Society, the Port Adelaide literary society, The Worker and other newspapers, member of the Royal Commission into the South Australian pastoral industry 1927.

== Early life ==
Lundie was born at Portland Estate, South Australia to railway labourer John Lundie and Mary Ann Josephine, née Moran. He was educated at local Port Adelaide public schools but at the age of eleven began working as a station-hand in western New South Wales.

He joined the Amalgamated Shearers' Union of Australasia (which amalgamated to form the Australian Workers' Union in 1894) in 1887 and was president of the Adelaide branch from 1889. He served as an organiser from 1892 until his appointment as secretary from 1900, a position he would hold until his death in 1933. He was a leader of the 1894 shearers' strike and was president of the United Labourers' Union's South Australian branch from 1907 to 1912. He married Elizabeth Margaret Battens Armstrong on 20 January 1891; she died in 1907, and he remarried on 20 January 1909 to Edith Mary Armstrong, Elizabeth's cousin.

== Political career ==
A moderate supporter of direct action, Lundie was also a member of the United Labor Party and strongly believed it should remain under the control of the working class rather than politicians and union leaders. He engaged in bitter disputes with the Verran Labor government in 1910, and continued low-level opposition to the party leadership until 1917, when he was able to harness the resentment over the conscription split to take over the party. The Biographical Dictionary of the Australian Senate, under an entry for Albert Alfred Hoare (Senator 1922–1935), suggests "Lundie, state secretary of the AWU from 1900 to 1933 and president of the South Australian ALP in 1917, is often depicted as the one who master-minded the expulsion of the conscriptionists." Lundie was elected president of the party executive and later that year defeated William Spence to become the AWU's national president, a position he held until his own defeat by Arthur Blakeley in 1919. His attempts at direct political involvement had been less successful: he was defeated for the Senate in 1917 and 1919 and for the South Australian House of Assembly in 1905 and 1924. He was, however, a member of Port Adelaide City Council from 1900 to 1909 and Adelaide City Council from 1909 to 1931.

== Legacy ==
A teetotaller, Lundie died in 1933; his funeral was attended at the West Terrace Cemetery by around a thousand people. Lundie ward in the McEwen building at the old royal Adelaide hospital was named after him to honour more than 20 years as a board member. Lundie gardens, on the corner of south and west terraces, Adelaide, is also named after him in honour of more than 20 years as a councillor in the city of Adelaide. An ex-prisoners' hostel established by fellow councillor and state politician Albert (Bertie) Edwards in Whitmore Square was named after him in 1963.
