= Australian Workers' Union =

Trade union

AWU
- The Australian Workers' Union
- Founded: 1894; 132 years ago
- Founded at: Ballarat, Victoria
- Merger of: ASU; GLU
- Headquarters: Sydney, New South Wales
- Location: Australia
- Members: ▲77,063 (as at 31 December 2024)
- Key people: Paul Farrow, National Secretary
- Affiliations: ACTU, ALP, ITF, IUF, IndustriALL
- Website: AWU
- known as AWU-FIMEE Amalgamated Union 1993–1995

The Australian Workers' Union (AWU) is one of Australia's largest and oldest trade unions. It traces its origins to unions founded in the pastoral and mining industries in the late 1880s and it currently has approximately 80,000 members.

The AWU is affiliated with the ACTU and the ALP (Australian Labor Party), particularly the Labor Right faction.

== Structure ==
The AWU is a national union made up of state branches. Each AWU member belongs to one of six geographic branches. Every four years AWU members elect branch and national officials: National President, the National Secretary, and the National Assistant Secretary. They also elect the National Executive and the Branch Executives which act as the Board of Directors for the union.

The AWU's rules are registered with Fair Work Australia and its internal elections are conducted by the Australian Electoral Commission.

The AWU is affiliated with the Australian Labor Party, Australian Council of Trade Unions, the International Metalworkers' Federation, the International Union of Foodworkers and the International Transport Workers' Federation. The current AWU National President is Marina Williams, and the National Secretary is Paul Farrow.

== Coverage ==
The AWU has broad coverage over, amongst others but mainly the unskilled trades, the following industries:

- Administrative and support services
- Agriculture, forestry and fishing
- Arts and recreation services
- Construction
- Electricity, gas, water and waste services
- Manufacturing
- Mining
- Public administration and safety

== History ==
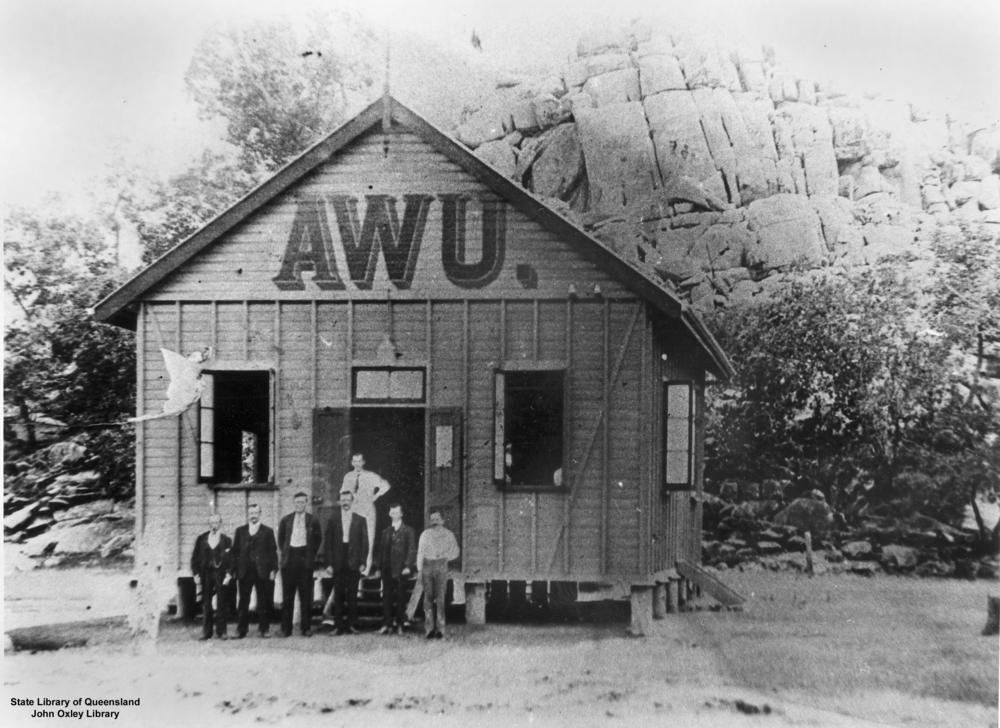
Australian Workers' Union Hall, Chillagoe, Queensland, ca. 1915

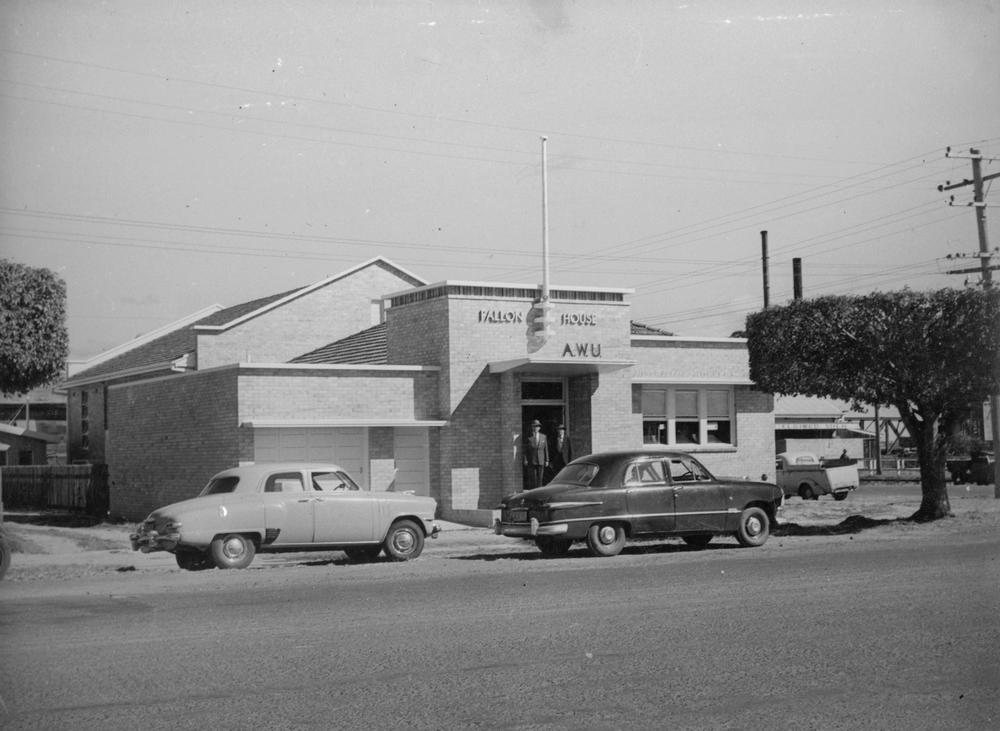
Union building named in honour of Clarrie Fallon, 1953

The AWU grew from a number of earlier unions, notably the Australasian Shearers' Union, founded by William Spence, Alexander Poynton (OBE, an inaugural member of the Australian House of Representatives), brother Charles Poynton, and David Temple in Creswick, Victoria in 1886. This union joined with shearers' unions in Bourke and Wagga in New South Wales to form the Amalgamated Shearers Union of Australasia in 1887. In 1894 this union amalgamated with the General Labourers Union, which had formed in 1891, to form the Australian Workers' Union.

The Queensland Shearers Union, formed in 1887, and the Queensland Workers Union merged in 1891 to form the Amalgamated Workers Union of Queensland. In 1904 the AWUQ amalgamated with the AWU, to form a union with a combined membership of 34,000.

The AWU later absorbed a number of other unions in the pastoral, mining and timber industries notably the Amalgamated Workers Association of Queensland in 1913, and the Federated Mining Employees Association of Australia in 1917. Since these industries were the principal sources of Australia's wealth in the 19th century, the AWU soon became Australia's largest and most powerful union.

The defeat of the great 1891 shearers' strike and the 1890 Maritime strike led the AWU to reject direct action, and it has been a force for moderation in the Australian union movement ever since. It was a firm opponent of the Industrial Workers of the World, the Communist Party of Australia, NSW Premier Jack Lang and other radical forces in the Australian labour movement. For many years Communists were banned from AWU membership. In the 1930s the Communist Party launched a rival Pastoral Workers Industrial Union, but this failed to break the AWU's grip on its membership.

The Northern Territory branch of the AWU was a central faction in the most recent worker's rebellion in Australia, the Darwin Rebellion in 1912–1918.

When the trade unions formed the Australian Labor Party following the defeat of the 1890s strikes, the AWU became a powerful influence in the party, particularly in Queensland and Western Australia, and to a lesser extent in the other states. Labor state governments were heavily influenced by AWU leaders such as Edward Grayndler, Tom Dougherty and NSW AWU Secretary Charlie Oliver. Labor was in government in Queensland from 1915 to 1929 and from 1932 to 1957, and the AWU was able to exert considerable political influence through long-serving premiers such as William Forgan Smith and Ned Hanlon.

The federation of the Australian colonies in 1901 led to the establishment of the Australian Arbitration system. The AWU strongly supported arbitration as a mechanism of resolving industrial disputes without resorting to strike action. The Pastoral Industry Award, negotiated by the AWU, was the first federal award granted by the Commonwealth Court of Conciliation and Arbitration. The AWU maintained its registration under state industrial systems and continues to participate in many state awards.

During the years since federation that the Australian industrial relations system has been dominated by the Court and its successors, the Conciliation and Arbitration Commission and the Australian Industrial Relations Commission, the AWU and its members were among that system's principal beneficiaries. The AWU remains a strong advocate of arbitration in the union movement. The AWU was not affiliated with the Australian Council of Trade Unions for many years, preferring to maintain its independent relationship with the arbitration system.

With the shift in employment from the pastoral industries to the urban manufacturing and service sectors, the AWU's political influence and power declined as the pastoral areas became less significant in terms of employee numbers. This shift led to many rural electorate areas that were influenced by the AWU and workers falling to the conservative side of politics and in particular the National Party. The split in the Queensland ALP in 1957, which resulted in Labor being in opposition for 32 years, deprived the AWU of its greatest area of influence, although it remained influential in the long-serving (1941–65 and 1976–88) New South Wales Labor governments.

In 1993 the AWU amalgamated with the Federation of Industrial Manufacturing and Engineering Employees (itself an amalgamation of the Federated Ironworkers' Association of Australia and the Australasian Society of Engineers) to form the AWU-FIMEE Amalgamated Union. In 1995 the union reverted to using the name Australian Workers' Union.

In recent years the AWU has sought to modernise and to broaden its membership beyond its declining traditional base. Today it represents workers in the metals, aviation, oil and gas, mining, construction, food processing and retail industries, as well as its traditional base in the pastoral and mining areas. Its expansion into new areas has brought the AWU into conflict with some other unions, particularly the National Union of Workers and the Construction, Forestry, Mining and Energy Union.

For many years the AWU published two newspapers, The Australian Worker in New South Wales and The Worker (founded in 1890) in Brisbane. Under the editorship of Henry Boote from 1916 to 1943 they were among the most influential union newspapers in Australia. The two papers were merged in 1974 and today The Australian Worker is published in a magazine format in association with Australian Consolidated Press.

On 24 October 2017 the union's offices in Sydney and Melbourne were raided by the Australian Federal Police. The raids were on behalf of the Registered Organisations Commission (ROC).

=== Support for White Australia policy ===
Melbourne Trades Hall was opened in 1859 with Trades and Labour Councils and Trades Halls opening in all cities and most regional towns in the following forty years. During the 1880s Trade unions developed among shearers, miners, and stevedores (wharf workers), but soon spread to cover almost all blue-collar jobs. Shortages of labour led to high wages for a prosperous skilled working class, whose unions demanded and got an eight-hour day and other benefits unheard of in Europe.

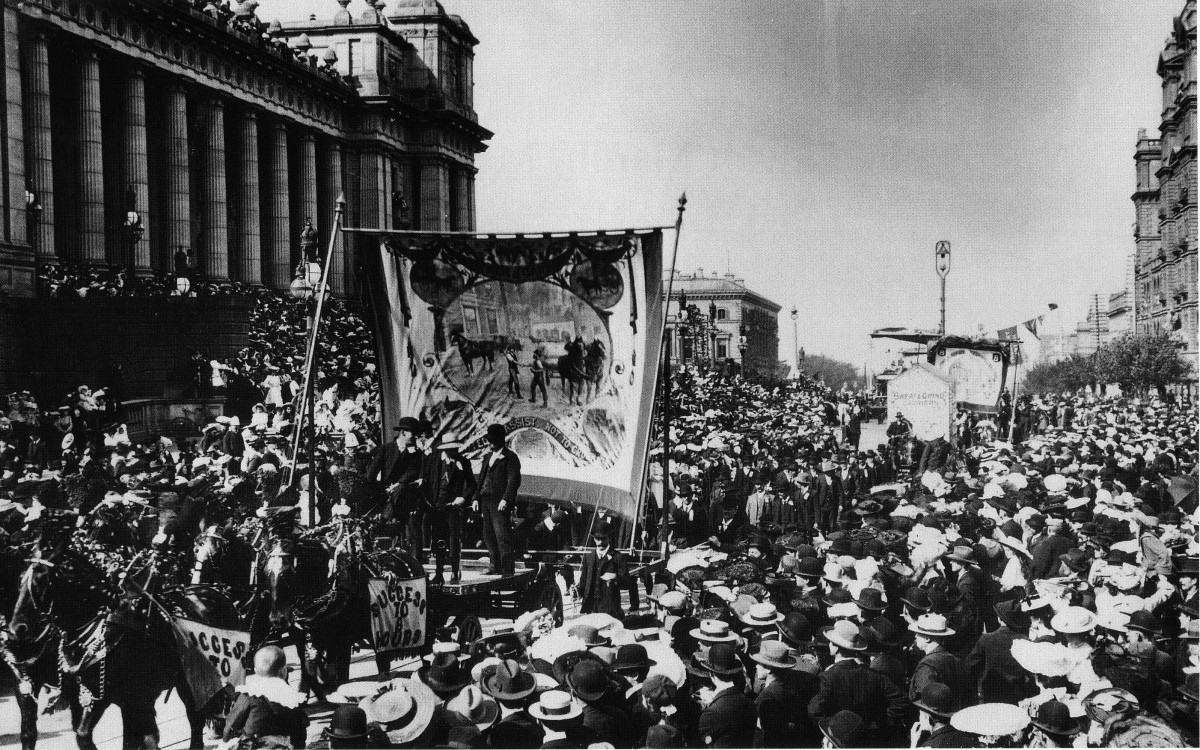
Eight-hour day march circa 1900, outside Parliament House in Spring Street, Melbourne.

Australia gained a reputation as "the working man's paradise." Some employers tried to undercut the unions by importing Chinese labour. This produced a reaction which led to all the colonies restricting Chinese and other Asian immigration. This was the foundation of the White Australia Policy. The "Australian compact", based around centralised industrial arbitration, a degree of government assistance particularly for primary industries, and White Australia, was to continue for many years before gradually dissolving in the second half of the 20th century.

The growth of the sugar industry in Queensland in the 1870s led to searching for labourers prepared to work in a tropical environment. During this time, thousands of "Kanakas" (Pacific Islanders) were brought into Australia as indentured workers. This and related practices of bringing in non-white labour to be cheaply employed was commonly termed "blackbirding" and refers to the recruitment of people through trickery and kidnappings to work on plantations, particularly the sugar cane plantations of Queensland (Australia) and Fiji. In the 1870s and 1880s, the growing trade union movement began a series of protests against foreign labour. Their arguments were that Asians and Chinese took jobs away from white men, worked for "substandard" wages, lowered working conditions and refused unionisation.

Objections to these arguments came largely from wealthy land owners in rural areas. It was argued that without Asiatics to work in the tropical areas of the Northern Territory and Queensland, the area would have to be abandoned. Despite these objections to restricting immigration, between 1875 and 1888 all Australian colonies enacted legislation which excluded all further Chinese immigration. Asian immigrants already residing in the Australian colonies were not expelled and retained the same rights as their Anglo and Southern compatriots.

Agreements were made to further increase these restrictions in 1895 following an Inter-colonial Premier's Conference where all colonies agreed to extend entry restrictions to all non-white races. However, in attempting to enact this legislation, the Governors of New South Wales, South Australia and Tasmania reserved the bills, due to a treaty with Japan, and they did not become law. Instead, the Natal Act of 1897 was introduced, restricting "undesirable persons" rather than any specific race.

The British government in London was not pleased with legislation that discriminated against certain subjects of its Empire, but decided not to disallow the laws that were passed. Colonial Secretary Joseph Chamberlain explained in 1897:

We quite sympathise with the determination...of these colonies...that there should not be an influx of people alien in civilisation, alien in religion, alien in customs, whose influx, moreover, would seriously interfere with the legitimate rights of the existing labouring population.

The Barton government which came to power following the first elections to the Commonwealth parliament in 1901 was formed by the Protectionist Party with the support of the Australian Labor Party. The support of the Labor Party was contingent upon restricting non-white immigration, reflecting the attitudes of the Australian Workers Union and other labour organisations at the time, upon whose support the Labor Party was founded.

Ted Grayndler, general secretary of the Australian Workers' Union (AWU) (1912–1941), and Tom Dougherty (1944–1972) supported the White Australia Policy.

The AWU abandoned its support for the White Australia policy in 1972.

== National Secretaries of the AWU ==
- David Temple 1886–94 (Amalgamated Shearers' Union of Australasia)
- William Spence 1894–1898
- Arthur Rae 1898–99
- Donald Macdonell 1899–1911
- Tom White 1911–1912
- Edward Grayndler 1912–1941
- Clarrie Fallon 1941–1943
- William "Beecher" Hay 1943–1944
- Tom Dougherty 1944–1972
- Frank Mitchell 1972–1983
- Gill Barr 1983–1987

- Errol Hodder 1987–1991
- Michael Forshaw 1991–1994 (Jointly from 1993)
- Steve Harrison 1993–1997 (Jointly until 1996)
- Ian Cambridge 1994–1996 (Jointly)
- Vern Falconer 1997
- Terry Muscat 1997–2001
- Bill Shorten 2001–2007
- Paul Howes 2007–2014
- Scott McDine 2014–2016
- Daniel Walton 2016–2023
- Paul Farrow 2023–present

== National Presidents of the AWU ==
- William Spence 1886–93 (Amalgamated Shearers' Union of Australasia)
- Thomas H. Williams 1894
- Arthur Rae 1895–97
- William Spence 1898–1916
- Frank Lundie 1917–1918
- Arthur Blakeley 1919–24
- John Barnes 1924–38
- J.C. Lamont 1938–39
- John McNeill 1939–43
- Vic Johnson 1943–47

- Bill Nicol 1947–50
- Henry "Brahma" Davis 1950–65
- Edgar Williams 1965–82
- Alan Begg 1982–89
- Bill Ludwig 1989–97 (Jointly from 1994)
- Bob Redmond 1994–97 (Jointly from 1994)
- Graham Roberts 1997–2001
- Bill Ludwig 2001–2017
- Marina Williams 2017–present

== See also ==
- AWU affair, a scandal involving the AWU Workplace Reform Association Fund in the 1990s
- Darwin Rebellion, a political protest in Darwin in the 1910s
