= David Temple (trade unionist) =

Australian trade unionist

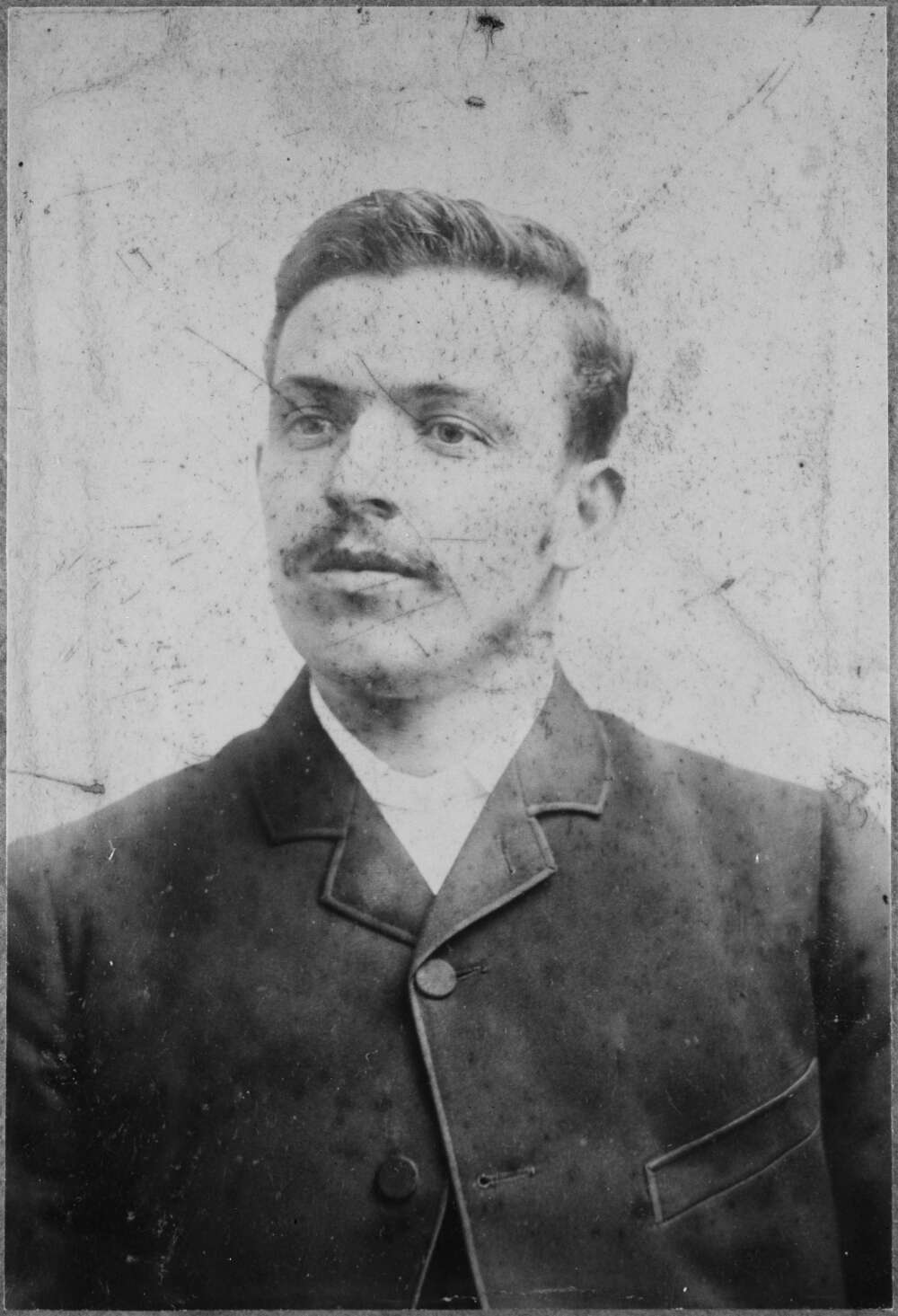
David Temple c. 1887

David Temple (4 July 1862 – 27 September 1921) was an influential early Australian trade unionist.

He was born at Creswick, Victoria, where he became a miner and part-time shearer. In 1886, he became the founder and secretary of the Australian Shearers' Union, in response to a cut in shearing rates, initially largely enrolling and organising members across Victoria on his own. In January 1887, Temple's union merged with smaller shearers unions in New South Wales to form the Amalgamated Shearers' Union of Australasia with Temple as general secretary, which by 1890 had become, according to Clyde Cameron, the "largest and most effective labour organization in Australia". In attributing credit for the union's success, historian Nick Dyrenfurth concluded that "while [William] Spence conceived of the novel idea of sending out an army of paid organisers, it was Temple who led the operation on the ground". Temple was also a key supporter of the union's involvement in the 1890 Australian maritime dispute and the union's support for the new Labor Party in 1891.

Temple initially supported the amalgamation of the ASU into the Australian Workers' Union in 1894, but became opposed due to issues with the merger process, falling out bitterly with union president and long-term colleague William Spence in the process; he stormed out of the merger conference and resigned the secretary role. Temple and Spence continued to clash bitterly in the years following his departure around their respective contributions to the union. He later ran a grocery business and cleared postal boxes in Footscray. He died in 1921 and was buried in the Anglican section of Fawkner Cemetery.

The Australian Workers' Union's Adelaide headquarters was named David Temple House on 11 July 1986.
