= Bill Ludwig =

Australian trade unionist (1934–2022)

Bill Ludwig OAM

National President of the Australian Workers Union
- In office 2001–2017
- Preceded by: Graham Roberts
- Succeeded by: Marina Williams
- In office 1989–1997
- Preceded by: Alan Begg
- Succeeded by: Graham Roberts

Queensland Branch Secretary of the Australian Workers Union
- In office 1988–2013
- Succeeded by: Ben Swan

Personal details
- Born: William Patrick Ludwig; 25 May 1934 Longreach, Queensland, Australia
- Died: 11 April 2022 (aged 87)
- Children: Joe Ludwig
- Education: Marist College Ashgrove
- Occupation: Trade union official
- Awards: Medal of the Order of Australia (1997); Centenary Medal (2001)
- Nickname: Big Bill

William Patrick Ludwig OAM (25 May 1934 – 11 April 2022) was a senior Australian trade union official who served as National President of the Australian Workers' Union (AWU), with a brief interruption, from 1989 to 2017. He also served as Queensland Branch Secretary of the AWU from 1988 to 2013. Ludwig was a prominent figure in the Australian Labor Party, heading the Labor Forum or AWU Faction which dominated the Queensland branch of the party.

== Early life and career ==
Ludwig was born in Longreach, Queensland, on 25 May 1934. The death of his mother when Ludwig was aged twelve was described as a formative experience. Raised by his maternal aunts, Ludwig attended Marist College Ashgrove in Brisbane, leaving school at fifteen.

Ludwig began his working life as a shearer in the 1950s in Queensland, where he joined the Australian Workers' Union. Taught the trade by one of his late mother's uncles, he became what was described as a "gun shearer". Ludwig participated in the bitter but ultimately successful shearers' strike of 1956, but was subsequently blacklisted for his involvement. After a period spent working in Victoria, Ludwig served as an AWU Queensland shed representative until 1970, when he was appointed as Western District organiser in Cunnamulla and later in Roma.

== Union leadership ==
In 1982, Ludwig was elected as the South Western District Secretary of the Queensland Branch of the AWU, a position he held until he was elected as Secretary of the Queensland Branch in 1988. He held this position until 2013.

Ludwig served two terms as National President of the AWU, from 1989 until 1997 and from 2001 until 2017. He worked closely with Bill Shorten, who served as AWU National Secretary from 2001 to 2007 alongside Ludwig as National President.

Ludwig is credited with reuniting and reinvigorating the union in the mid-1990s when it was beset with internal fighting and close to bankruptcy. He was instrumental in the development of the offshore alliance, a 2003 agreement struck between the AWU and the Maritime Union of Australia to eliminate demarcation disputes in the offshore oil and gas industry. The 2003 agreement was signed by MUA National Secretary Paddy Crumlin and AWU leaders Bill Ludwig and Bill Shorten.

== Political power ==
Ludwig was head of the Labor Forum or AWU Faction, which dominated the Queensland branch of the Australian Labor Party. He served as a member of the ALP National Executive and Vice President of the ALP's Queensland Branch.

== Honours and awards ==
In the 1997 Australia Day Honours, Ludwig was awarded the Medal of the Order of Australia (OAM) for "service to Industrial Relations through The Australian Workers' Union". In 2001, he was awarded the Centenary Medal in recognition of his contribution to Australian society.

Ludwig was awarded life membership of the AWU at the union's National Conference in 2017.

== Personal life ==
Ludwig's son, Joe Ludwig, was an Labor Senator from Queensland who served in various ministerial portfolios including Minister for Agriculture, Fisheries and Forestry and Minister Assisting on Queensland Flood Recovery.,

== Death ==
Ludwig died on 11 April 2022, aged 87. Following his death, Queensland Acting Premier Cameron Dick paid tribute to Ludwig, stating: "Bill was one of the first people I spoke to after I was appointed Queensland Treasurer. These were the some of the hardest days of the pandemic, and things still looked bleak. Bill and I agreed that looking after Queensland workers, their families and their jobs had to be the Labor government's priority."

The Australian Workers' Union described Ludwig as "a giant of the labour movement in Australia", noting that "if there is one value that defined Bill, it was his unwavering view that workers should be able to organise collectively and stand up for their interests against bad bosses, and if need be, against politicians."
