= Shearers' Strike Camp Site, Barcaldine =

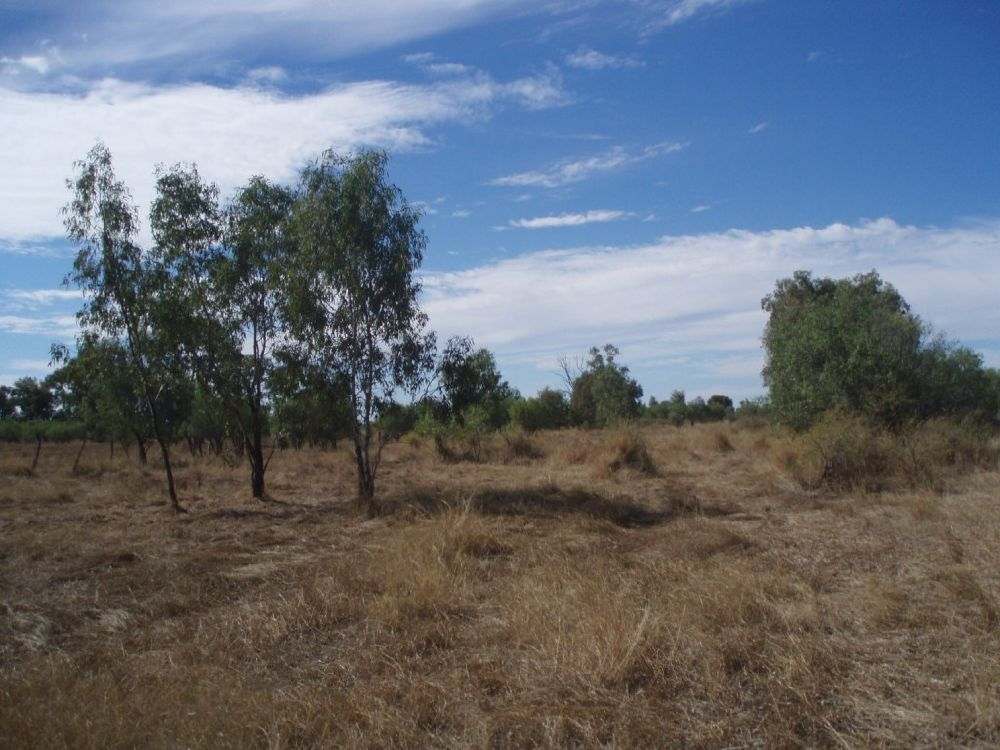
- Site of the Shearers' Strike Camp, 2009

- Location within Queensland Location within Australia
- 23.5322°S 145.3274°E
- Location: Bank of Lagoon Creek, Barcaldine, Barcaldine Region, Queensland, Australia

History
- Design period: 1870s–1890s (late 19th century)
- Built: 1891

Queensland Heritage Register
- Official name: Shearers' Strike Camp Site, Barcaldine
- Type: state heritage (archaeological)
- Designated: 21 October 1992
- Reference no.: 600019
- Significant period: 1891 (historical)
- Significant components: oven – antbed, blazed tree/dig tree/marker tree
- Builders: Shearers on strike

Shearers' Strike Camp Site is a heritage-listed campsite on the bank of Lagoon Creek, Barcaldine, Barcaldine Region, Queensland, Australia. It was built in 1891 by shearers on strike. It was added to the Queensland Heritage Register on 21 October 1992.

== History ==
The Shearers' Strike camp site was the focus of the 1891 confrontation between capital and labour in the pastoral industry. Although the strike was not successful and some leaders were gaoled, the event had major political consequences. In the following year the first endorsed representative of labour was elected to the Queensland Legislative Assembly and the strike was a key factor in the formation of the Australian Labor Party.

Barcaldine sprang up in 1886 as the terminus of the Central Western Railway from Rockhampton. The area was already settled by pastoralists and had previously been centred on Blackall. Large sheep stations were like small townships with their own working facilities, stores, workers' accommodation and tradesmen such as blacksmiths. The owners and managers of such properties had considerable power to dictate terms to an itinerant workforce recruited for the shearing season. Poor working conditions, low pay and the threat of competition from cheap foreign labour caused discontent within the industry.

Barcaldine was a natural focus for the development of unionism. As the railhead, the town drew many seasonal and casual workers. Besides shearers and hands there were navvies who had worked on the construction of the railway and carriers who had found their work reduced by it. Difficulties in finding work and financial hardship helped to build a sense of mateship and mutual support amongst sections of them. In 1887 the Central Queensland Carriers Union was formed at Barcaldine and the Queensland Shearers' Union at Blackall. Within a year it had 1300 members, indicating a perceived need for collective bargaining to obtain fair terms and working conditions. In 1888 the Central Queensland Labourers' Union was formed at Barcaldine. These three unions were the driving force behind the strike of 1891.

In Brisbane, the Trades and Labour Council was formed in 1885 and in 1889 became the Australian Labour Federation. At Barcaldine in the same year the Pastoral Employers' Association was founded and introduced reduced rates of pay. Many workers now joined unions and only severe wet weather in 1890 delayed a confrontation. By January 1891 union representatives had gathered at Barcaldine for meetings and pastoralists were trying to circumvent union rules by pressing shearers to sign freedom of contract forms. A strike was called and employers began to import non-union labour from the south. In February strikers, a number of whom were armed, gathered at Barcaldine.

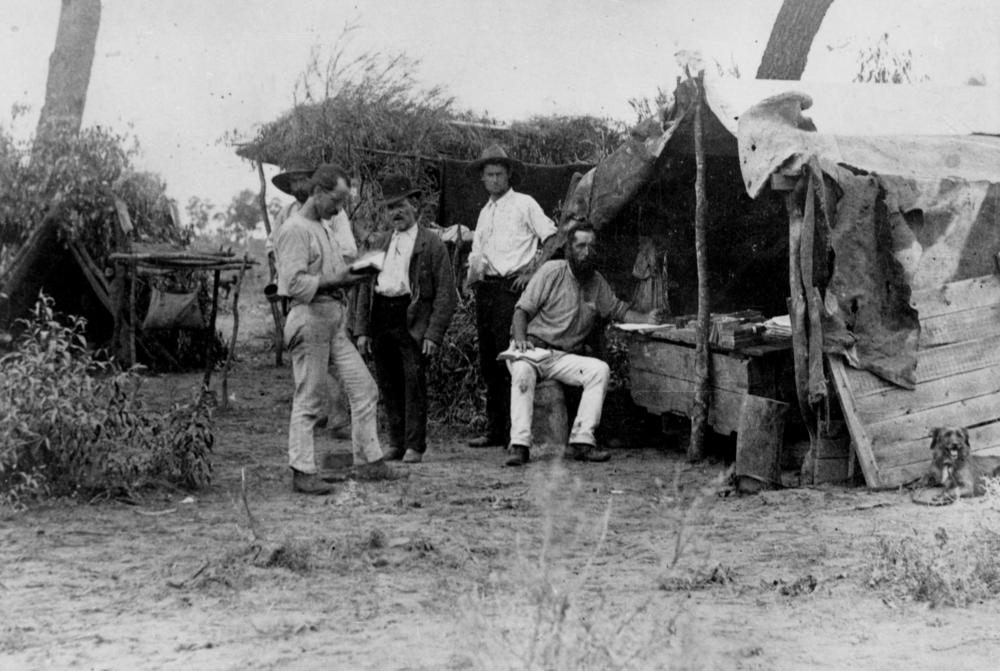
Library tent at the camp, 1891

Although camps were set up during the course of the strike from Cloncurry to the New South Wales border, the focus was on Barcaldine and the main camp on the southern bank of Lagoon Creek is said to have held up to 1000 strikers, some of whom were accompanied by their families. They were well organised and set up tents in rows with a cleared area between. Strikers were issued with food, soap, tobacco and salt and an oven made of ant bed was constructed to provide fresh bread. Provision was even made for recreation with a library tent set up and games such as cricket being played. Feelings amongst the strikers ran high and a tree was blazed on the north eastern edge of the camp and painted with the words "United we stand. Divided we fall. A.L.F. the strike camp 1891 W. Vincent, E Car...".

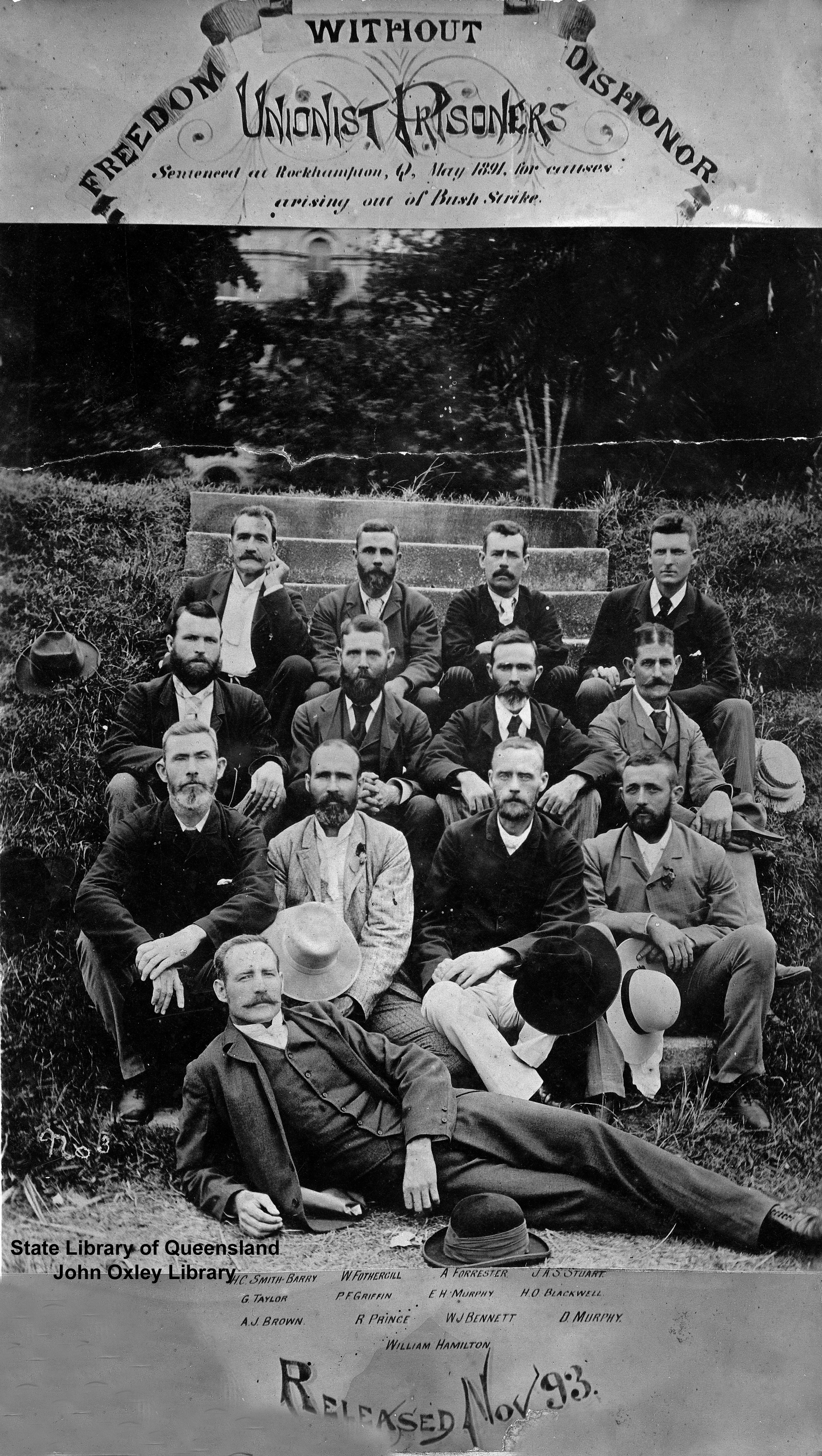
Card celebrating shearers as Unionist Prisoners after the shearers strike in Barcaldine

The Queensland Government responded to the crisis by sending police and soldiers and the strikers drilled and staged torchlight processions in the town, where there was considerable support for them. In March 1891 the situation escalated as carriers and railway workers went out in sympathy and military reinforcements arrived. Barcaldine became the focus of the whole country's interest and armed conflict was expected. Towards the end of March an old law was used to arrest all members of the strike committee for conspiracy. With the leaders gone, heavy rain and sickness in the camp and with the shearing season underway using labour brought in under military escort, the strikers began to disperse. The strike leaders were tried and most received heavy sentences. On June 15, the strike was officially called off. Although the strike had failed, it had far reaching effects. In the following year, Thomas Joseph (Tommy) Ryan (not to be confused with Thomas Joseph Ryan, Premier of Queensland 1915–1919) became the first endorsed labour candidate to be elected to the Queensland Legislative Assembly. Because the strike unified the labour movement it was a key event in the formation of the Australian Labor Party.

The strike has retained a central place in the history and mythology of Barcaldine. In 1982 a re-enactment of the strike using townspeople was staged. In 1987 a committee was formed to commemorate the strike and set up a granite and bronze monument near the famous Tree of Knowledge where workers met at the Barcaldine railway station. In 1988 an archaeological survey was carried out by Brian Egloff of Australian National University to accurately identify the correct location of the camp site. In 1991 a detailed survey and excavations were carried out. Artefacts found dating to the strike include metal containers, bottles, ammunition and horse and shearing equipment. The most visible artefact of the strike is the remains of the ant bed camp oven.

The centenary of the strike in 1991 was a major event which drew Labor politicians from around the country and saw the opening of the Workers' Heritage Centre.

== Description ==
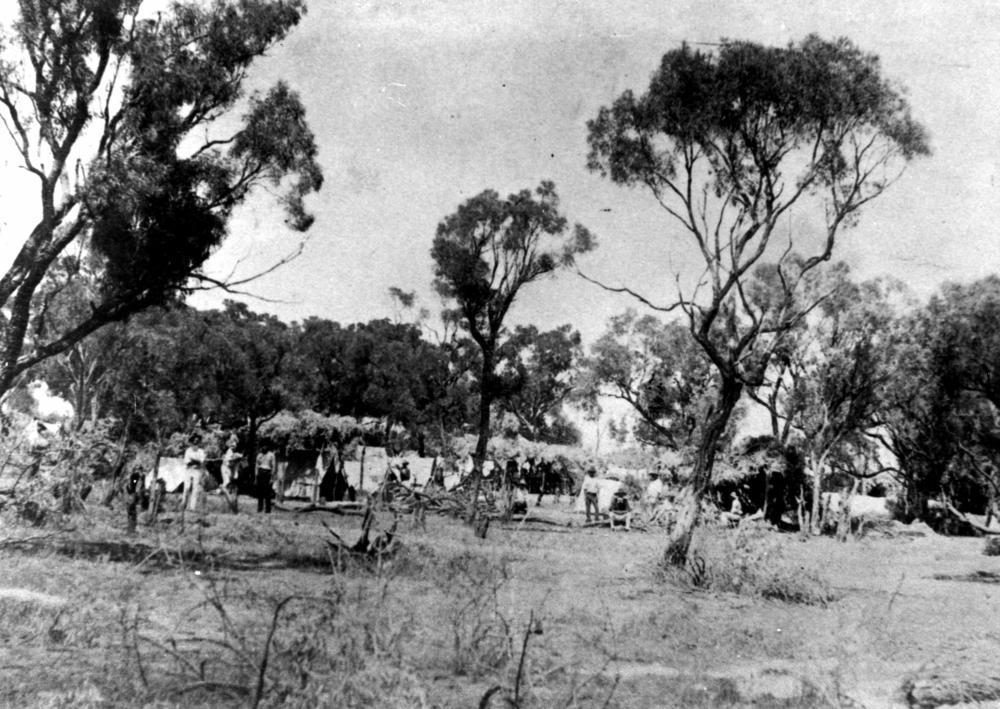
Shearers' camp, 1891

The campsite is approximately 3 kilometres (1.9 mi) north east of Barcaldine and situated on the south side of Lagoon Creek. It is lightly treed, mainly with gidgee, and the only visible evidence of its use during the Shearers' Strike is the remains of a camp oven made of ant bed, a blazed tree and a light artefact scatter, some of which is subsequent to the strike.

The strikers were not the first people to camp on this site and Egloff observed and recorded artefacts from previous Aboriginal use of the site. It has also since been used for camping by drovers.

The blazed tree, a coolabah, is on the north-eastern margin of the camp site. The main stem of the tree is dead, but it has put out a limb from the base which, when inspected in November 2000, was growing reasonably well. It received assessment and treatment from a tree surgeon in 1993. The blaze at the base of the trunk cut in 1891 has grown over to some extent but is still clearly visible although the inscription can no longer be seen.

== Heritage listing ==
Shearers' Strike Camp Site, Barcaldine was listed on the Queensland Heritage Register on 21 October 1992 having satisfied the following criteria.

The place is important in demonstrating the evolution or pattern of Queensland's history.

The Shearers' Strike Camp Site was the focus of the 1891 Shearers' Strike, a confrontation between capital and labour that was a major event in Queensland's history. The strike was a watershed in the development of organised representation of labour in Australia and the formation of the Australian Labor Party.

The place has potential to yield information that will contribute to an understanding of Queensland's history.

The Strike Camp Site has the potential to provide evidence of the material culture of shearers' lives in the late 19th century.

The place has a strong or special association with a particular community or cultural group for social, cultural or spiritual reasons.

The Strike Camp Site is closely linked with the cultural identity of Barcaldine and has a strong association with its people, many of whom are descended from participants in this event.

The place has a special association with the life or work of a particular person, group or organisation of importance in Queensland's history.

The Shearers' Strike Camp Site at Barcaldine has a special association with the history of the Australian Labor Party and with Trades Union in Queensland. It also has a special association with the life and work of William Hamilton and George Taylor, convicted strike leaders who went on to become prominent Labor politicians, and with many of the other participants in this event.
