= 1956 Australian shearers' strike =

Labour dispute in Australia

- Date: January 1956 – October 1956
- Location: New South Wales, Queensland, Victoria
- Caused by: 10% reduction in shearing rates ordered by Industrial Courts
- Goals: Restoration of previous shearing rates
- Methods: Strike action, picketing, black bans on wool
- Result: Strikers' victory; old rates largely reinstated

Parties
Shearers and local committees	Graziers and pastoral industry

Lead figures
Australian Workers' Union; Joe Bukowski; Tom Dougherty; Local strike committees	United Graziers' Association; Bill Gunn

Number
Thousands of shearers across three states	

The 1956 Australian shearers' strike was a major industrial dispute in the Australian pastoral industry that lasted from January to October 1956. The strike was triggered by wage reductions ordered by federal and state industrial courts and became one of the most significant labour disputes in twentieth-century Australian history. The conflict demonstrated the continuing strength of grassroots unionism in rural Australia and had significant political ramifications, contributing to the 1957 Queensland Labor Party split that reshaped Australian politics.

== Background ==
=== Economic context ===
Following the Korean War, wool prices had risen significantly due to increased demand, leading to prosperity loadings being added to shearers' wages through industrial awards. However, by the mid-1950s, international wool prices began to decline as nations built up stockpiles and demand normalized. The pastoral industry, facing reduced profitability, sought to reduce labour costs.

In response to a request from the United Graziers' Association, both the Commonwealth Conciliation and Arbitration Court and the Queensland Industrial Court ordered a 10% reduction in shearing rates to take effect from 1 January 1956. The reduction amounted to "thirty shillings a hundred" (sheep shorn), a substantial cut in shearers' earnings.

The wage cut came at a particularly difficult time for the pastoral industry. Many properties in Queensland had been affected by severe fly strike, with the Longreach Leader reporting 40,000 sheep lost in the Aramac district alone in March 1950. By 1954, some properties had converted from sheep to cattle operations. The 1956 strike occurred during one of the wettest years the region had experienced, creating additional challenges for both graziers and shearers.

=== The Australian Workers' Union and industrial relations ===
The Australian Workers' Union (AWU) had long been Australia's largest and most politically influential union, with particular strength in the pastoral industry. Since the defeat of the 1891 Australian shearers' strike, the AWU had generally favoured arbitration over direct industrial action. However, by the 1950s, tensions existed between the AWU's conservative leadership and more militant rank-and-file members organized in local shearers' committees.

Joe Bukowski, who became secretary of the Queensland branch of the AWU during the strike (in July 1956 following Harry Boland's death), was a complex figure who straddled these competing tendencies. While traditionally aligned with the AWU's moderate approach, Bukowski's longstanding personal animosity toward Queensland Premier Vince Gair would prove crucial to the strike's political dimensions.

== The strike ==
=== Organisation and initial response ===
The shearers' response to the wage cuts was immediate and well-coordinated despite the geographic dispersion of the workforce. Local shearers' committees, which had been organised in 1945 in towns across the pastoral districts, provided the organizational backbone of the strike. These committees, often led by militant unionists who were critical of the AWU's conservative leadership, called conferences in both New South Wales and Queensland to coordinate their response.

At these conferences, the shearers adopted a selective strategy: they would withdraw labour from all sheds that imposed the new reduced rates, while making shearing teams available to those pastoralists ("cockies") who were prepared to pay the old rates. This strike tactic succeeded, creating economic pressure on graziers while maintaining income for some union members.

Joe Bukowski, then secretary of the AWU in Queensland, issued a carefully worded public statement: "if I were a shearer I would not shear at the new rates." This formulation allowed the AWU to support the strike while avoiding formally sanctioning industrial action. Bill Gunn, president of the United Graziers Association, responded with his own call to arms, warning graziers: "you are in for the fight of your lives."

Shearers who worked at the old rates were required to pay a special levy into a strike fund. This fund supported those unable to find work at the old rates, demonstrating the solidarity that characterized the dispute. By June 1956, the levy system was formalized, with payment of the levy entitling shearers to work at sheds paying the old rates. The system required careful monitoring to ensure compliance.

=== Tactics and industrial action ===
The dispute quickly divided shearers into two camps: "old raters" (those refusing to work at reduced rates) and "new raters" (non-union labour, derisively called "scabs," working at the reduced rates). The conflict was marked by various forms of industrial action and solidarity:

Black bans: The most effective weapon in the strikers' arsenal was the black ban placed on wool shorn at the new rates. This made it difficult for graziers to transport or sell wool shorn by non-union labour.

Secondary boycotts: Railway workers, wharfies (waterside workers), and seamen refused to handle "scab wool" in a display of working-class solidarity. The railway workers were particularly crucial, as they controlled the transportation network essential for moving wool to market. Maritime unions prevented the export of wool from struck properties, understanding that an attack on shearers' wages could presage broader wage cuts across industries.

Pickets and confrontations: Picket lines were established to prevent the movement of wool from non-union sheds. In some shearing towns, violence erupted between striking shearers and non-union labour. A pub in Charleville notably served free beer to United Graziers' "volunteer" shearers, leading to confrontations with union members.

In Bourke, New South Wales, local organizers demonstrated particular militancy. In one incident, strikers intercepted two semitrailers attempting to bypass the town while transporting Queensland wool. Sydney newspapers reported the trucks were "hijacked by a crowd of shearers wielding knives," though accounts vary. Tom Dougherty, AWU National Secretary, directed local organisers to prevent wool shipments, saying they "could do nothing" from Sydney.

=== AWU leadership and internal tensions ===
Despite the public support from AWU leaders like Bukowski and Dougherty, many local organisers felt the union's official involvement was "half-hearted." In Bourke, for example, the local strike committee secretary was paid directly by the shearers rather than the AWU. There was reportedly only one visit by an AWU organiser during the entire 26-week strike in that district. This reflected ongoing tensions between the AWU's conservative leadership and more militant rank-and-file members who had been trying for years to democratize the union.

=== Government response and political dimensions ===
Queensland Premier Vince Gair, who led a Labor government, found himself in an increasingly untenable position. Unlike previous Queensland Labor premiers, Gair had not come from the AWU and had no previous trade union experience. More significantly, he harbored a personal dislike of Joe Bukowski dating back to their childhood in Rockhampton, where Bukowski had allegedly bullied him.

Gair attempted to remain officially neutral but took actions that infuriated the union movement. He negotiated with the federal Coalition government, led by Prime Minister Robert Menzies, to secure the export of wool shorn by non-union labour. In September 1956, this culminated in federal troops being stationed on Brisbane's waterfront to move wool bales that had been "blacked" by shearers.

The Premier's actions were widely criticized in the labour movement. Letters to the press argued that the strike represented opposition to the principle of arbitration, with some critics contending that shearers had abandoned their 1891 principles. E. T. Towner, a Victoria Cross recipient from World War I, wrote that shearers now wanted "freedom of contract" rather than accepting rates set by the Arbitration Court. Others criticized Gair for his "weak" non-intervention, a charge that seemed contradictory given his behind-the-scenes support for the graziers.

Seeking support for the strike and for his broader confrontation with Gair over other issues, Bukowski drew close to the left-wing Queensland Trades and Labour Council (TLC), led by Boilermakers' Union secretary Jack Egerton. The AWU had remained aloof from the TLC for decades, making this alliance notable. When Harry Boland died in July 1956, Bukowski was appointed both secretary of the State branch of the AWU and president of the Queensland Central Executive (QCE) of the ALP. He immediately reaffiliated the AWU with the TLC, creating a powerful bloc within the Labor Party.

== Duration and outcome ==
The strike lasted approximately 26 weeks (six months) in New South Wales, where most shearing occurred between February and July. In Queensland, however, the dispute continued for ten months, from January until October 1956, making it one of the most protracted industrial disputes in the industry's history. Victoria ended its participation earlier in the year.

In October 1956, the Commonwealth Conciliation and Arbitration Court brought the shearing rate into line with the federal award. The final settlement represented a compromise: the rate was slightly less than before the dispute but significantly better than the full 10% reduction initially imposed. The shearers and the AWU largely succeeded in achieving restoration of rates close to the previous levels, and the strike was widely considered a major victory for the union and its members.

The shearers' victory was attributed to several factors: the effectiveness of black bans and secondary boycotts, the solidarity of allied unions (particularly transport and maritime workers), and crucially, the lack of unity among graziers. Many pastoralists, recognizing the quality of union shearers and the difficulty of obtaining reliable non-union labour, were willing to pay the old rates rather than face prolonged delays in shearing.

The duration of the strike and the effectiveness of union organisation were notable given that workers were scattered across thousands of square miles of pastoral country. The shearers' ability to maintain solidarity through strike funds, coordinated action across multiple states, and support from the wider labour movement demonstrated the continuing strength of grassroots unionism in rural Australia, even with ambivalent support from the AWU's official leadership.

== Legacy ==
=== Political ramifications ===
The 1956 strike had significant political ramifications, particularly in Queensland. The alliance forged between Bukowski's AWU and Egerton's TLC during the strike proved decisive in Queensland Labor politics. With Bukowski holding dual positions as AWU secretary and QCE president, and with the AWU now affiliated with the TLC, this axis controlled the numbers in the party organization.

Premier Vince Gair's actions during the strike contributed significantly to his deteriorating relationship with the union movement. This relationship reached its breaking point in early 1957 over the unrelated issue of three weeks' annual leave. When Gair refused to comply with the 1956 Labor conference's direction to introduce three weeks' annual leave for state award workers, the QCE summoned him to show cause why he should not be expelled from the party. On 24 April 1957, despite an eloquent self-defense, Gair was expelled by a vote of 35 to 30—the alliance between the AWU and TLC providing the crucial numbers.

The strike thus helped cement the alliance that expelled Gair and his supporters from the Labor Party, leading to the formation of the Queensland Labor Party (QLP) and Gair's eventual leadership of the Democratic Labor Party (DLP) at the federal level. The resulting split ended 25 years of continuous Labor government in Queensland and had lasting effects on Australian politics through the DLP's influence on federal elections for the next two decades.

=== Significance in labour history ===
Historians have noted the 1956 strike's significance as one of the last great pastoral strikes in Australia. It represented a continuation of the militant tradition established in the 1891 Australian shearers' strike, which had led to the formation of the Australian Labor Party. However, unlike the earlier strike, the 1956 dispute avoided the dramatic confrontations and bitterness of 1891 or the 1931 Australian shearers' strike.

The strike demonstrated both the strengths and limitations of the arbitration system that had dominated Australian industrial relations since Federation. While the graziers had obtained wage reductions through the arbitration system, the shearers' collective action effectively nullified this decision, showing that industrial power could override legal determinations when workers maintained solidarity.

The role of local shearers' committees, operating semi-independently of the AWU hierarchy, prefigured later rank-and-file movements in Australian unionism. The tension between these grassroots organizations and the conservative AWU leadership reflected broader debates about union democracy that would continue into subsequent decades.

=== Cultural representation ===
The 1956 shearers' strike inspired the acclaimed 1975 Australian film Sunday Too Far Away, directed by Ken Hannam and starring Jack Thompson. The film's original treatment by screenwriter John Dingwall explicitly concerned the 1956 strike, though this aspect was condensed in the final production, which is set in 1955. Despite the compression of historical detail, the film drew heavily upon the experiences and ethos of shearers during the strike period.

Sunday Too Far Away became a landmark of the Australian New Wave cinema movement and is acclaimed for its understated realism in depicting the work, camaraderie, and culture of shearers. The film won three Australian Film Institute awards and grossed $1,356,000 at the Australian box office, confirming Jack Thompson's status as Australia's leading movie star of the era. The film's portrayal of mateship, industrial solidarity, and the harsh realities of rural working life has become an iconic representation of Australian working-class culture.

The strike took place in part in Barcaldine, the same town that had been the centre of the 1891 strike and the birthplace of the Labor Party. This geographic continuity connected the 1956 dispute to the broader tradition of labour militancy in Australia's pastoral industry and reinforced Barcaldine's symbolic importance in Australian labour history.

== See also ==
- 1891 Australian shearers' strike
- Australian labour movement
- Australian Workers' Union
- Vince Gair
