= 1890 Australian maritime dispute =

Industrial dispute

The 1890 Australian maritime dispute was an industrial dispute that began on 15 August 1890 when the Mercantile Marine Officers' Association directed its members to give 24 hours notice to their employers after negotiations broke down with the Steamship Owners' Association of Victoria over longstanding pay and conditions claims. Industrial action quickly spread to seamen, wharf labourers, then gas stockers. Coal miners from Newcastle, Broken Hill, and even New Zealand were locked out after refusing to dig coal for non-union operated vessels. By September 1890, 28,500 workers were on strike.

The Melbourne branch of the Marine Officers' Association had joined the Melbourne Trades Hall Council, and the New Zealand branch was affiliated with the Maritime Labour Council. In July 1890 the Union Steamship Company of New Zealand had conceded a pay rise of one pound, following arbitration. Many of the owners had privately conceded that an increase in pay was justified and overdue. The Sydney branch of the union, not affiliated with the Sydney Maritime Council, negotiated with the owners and were told their case was reasonable, but could not be considered while the Melbourne branch was affiliated with Melbourne Trades Hall. In a last-minute mediation, officials of the union agreed to withdraw from the Melbourne Trades Hall, if employers agreed to compromise in a last-minute meeting with a union delegation. The Shipowners refused to meet the delegation, which thus precipitated the strike.

Ostensibly over pay and conditions, the causes of the dispute were considered more complex, and point to an employer conspiracy to render trade union activity ineffective, and employer activity to counter union solidarity in secondary boycott of non-union shorn wool in the pastoral industry. While some historians argue that the strike was caused by a downturn in economic conditions, others argue the depression of the 1890s did not start till 1892.

In early July 1890, the Amalgamated Shearers' Union of Australasia issued a manifesto calling for a boycott on non-union wool shorn in the coming shearing season. This emulated a successful boycott of non-union wool called by the Queensland Shearers Union in 1889 and instituted by the Wharf Labourer's Union and Brisbane Trades Hall. The campaign to break union solidarity was engineered by stevedore Alfred Lamb, a member of the New South Wales Legislative Assembly, owner of one of the four main wool exporting firms, and vice president of the NSW Employers' Union. He attended meetings of the Pastoralists Union of NSW, the Pastoralists Union of Victoria, and organised a memorandum of understanding and agreements among wool shippers, shipping agents and shipowners.

== Social turmoil ==
During the strike, military units were extensively used in New South Wales and Victoria. Armed troops were deployed to support the police in Sydney, Melbourne, Newcastle and a number of other ports around Australia, as violence escalated against non-union labour and against the property of companies operating shipping, the mines, the wharves and ports.

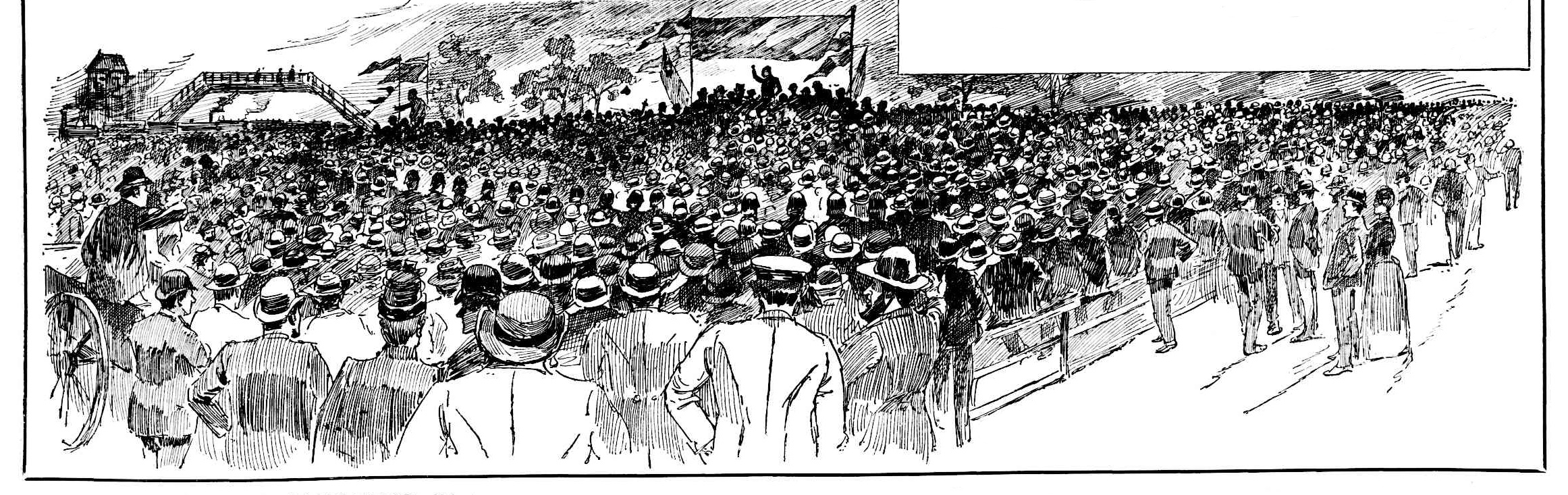
'The Mass Meeting of Trade Unionists in Flinders Park, Melbourne', published in Illustrated Sydney News, 27 September 1890, page 14.

In Melbourne, the announcement that a public meeting was going to be held on 31 August 1890 to support the maritime strikers sent the Victorian government into precautionary mode. On the eve of the meeting, the Victorian Mounted Rifles were briefed by their commanding officer Lieutenant-Colonel Thomas Price:

Men of the Mounted Rifles, one of your obligations imposes on you the duty of resisting invasion by a foreign enemy, but you are also liable to be called upon to assist in preserving law and order in the colony. ... To do your work faintly would be a grave mistake. If it has to be done effectively you will each be supplied with 40 rounds of ammunition, leaden bullets, and if the order is given to fire, don't let me see any rifle pointed in the air; fire low and lay them out so that the duty will not have to be performed again.

Price was quite clear and quite unapologetic about his intentions. He only wanted to hit the strikers in the legs ... not to kill them outright. He explained that the term 'lay them out' was used in his regiment to mean 'temporary disablement'.

A force of 1,000 militia and mounted police and another 1,000 special constables were embodied by the time of the meeting. These forces, apart from a troop of mounted police were held in reserve out of the way and the 40,000 who attended the meeting, although enthusiastic, were orderly and the forces were not called in.

== Union defeat ==
The strike was defeated when the Marine Officers returned to work on the employer's terms in November 1890, with Illawarra coal miners being the last workers to return to work in January 1891. A shortage of money to sustain the strike and a plentiful supply of strikebreakers eventually defeated the strikers. Wage cuts were introduced for everyone in the maritime industry, with wage cuts of up to 30 per cent. The defeat of the 1890 maritime strike and the 1891 Australian shearers' strike, laid the framework for the Australian labour movement entry into parliamentary politics. The New South Wales Labour Defence Committee summed up the union's mood in this statement:

the time has come when trade unionists must use the parliamentary machine that in the past has used them.

== New Zealand ==
The strike also occurred in New Zealand, the nation's first nationwide strike. Maritime Council Head John Millar asked the Union Steamship Company to pause trade with Australia, but they refused. This resulted in Union Steamship Company employees walking off the job, and 8000 workers on strikes at New Zealand ports. The strike was consider a defeat for the unions; however, arbitration followed, outlawing future lockouts by employers, as well as allowing unions to register under the Industrial Conciliation and Arbitration Act 1894.
