= Errol Hodder =

National Secretary of the Australian Workers' Union
- In office 1987–1991

Personal details
- Born: September 4, 1938
- Occupation: shearer

Errol Raymond Hodder (born 4 September 1938), former Queensland branch secretary of the Australian Workers' Union (1982–1988), general secretary of the Australian Workers' Union (1987–1991) and retired Commissioner of the Australian Industrial Relations Commission (1991–2003) and of the Queensland Industrial Relations Commission (1997–2003).

Hodder worked in western Queensland as a wool presser during the 1956 Shearer's Strike and later as a shearer. He was a member of the AWU from 1969 to 1991. He was South Western District Secretary from 1971 to 1982. In 1982, he became Queensland Branch Secretary of the AWU and Senior Queensland Vice-president of the Australian Labor Party. He led the rebuilding of the AWU's influence within the Labor Party, allying with the Socialist Left faction in 1985 and taking control of the Queensland Branch from the "Old Guard" in 1987. This contributed directly to Wayne Goss's political successful state election campaign in December 1989. In 1988 Hodder was appointed General Secretary of the AWU. Hodder was elected Junior ACTU Vice-president in 1989. Hodder was required to resign from all union and political offices to take office as Commissioner of the AIRC in 1991.

Trade union offices
Preceded by Gill Barr	General Secretary of the Australian Workers' Union; 1987 – 1991	Succeeded by Michael Forshaw
