= Australian Shearers' Union =

Early trade union in Australia

The Australian Shearers' Union (also known as the Australasian Shearers Union, sometimes referred to as the Creswick Shearers' Union) was a significant but short-lived early trade union in Victoria and southern New South Wales. It was formed on 12 June 1886 at a public meeting at Fern's Hotel, Ballarat, to resist a proposed reduction of shearing rates in Victoria and New South Wales, with David Temple as secretary and William Spence as president. The union was headquartered at Creswick in Victoria. A Melbourne branch was formed in July. By November 1886, it claimed 5000 members: 1500 in Victoria and 3500 in southern New South Wales. Having sought to amalgamate with the various New South Wales unions from an early stage, it merged with the smaller Wagga Shearers Union and Bourke Shearers Union to form the Amalgamated Shearers' Union of Australasia in January 1887.
