= Amalgamated Shearers' Union of Australasia =

Early trade union in Australia

The Amalgamated Shearers' Union of Australasia was an early Australian trade union. It was formed in January 1887 with the amalgamation of the Wagga Shearers Union and Bourke Shearers Union in New South Wales with the Victorian-based Australian Shearers' Union, with William Spence as president and David Temple as secretary.

In 1886 three organisers were sent to New Zealand to enrol members and set up branches. A special effort was made to recruit Maori members, who were highly represented in the shearing industry (the rules were even printed in Maori). Membership in NZ reached 2,300 in the first year. The Moree Shearers Union in NSW and the South Australian Shearers Union both merged into the union as new branches in 1888, and the union widened its reach to include shearers across the four colonies. However, the union was "constantly at odds with" the Queensland Shearers' Union and never became established in that colony. It helped establish the General Labourers Union of Australasia in 1891 in order to unionise shed-hands and present a united front during industrial action as a result of issues arising from the 1891 shearers' strike, and subsequently merged with the GLUA in 1894 to form the Australian Workers' Union.
