= William Spence =

Australian politician

The Honourable William Spence
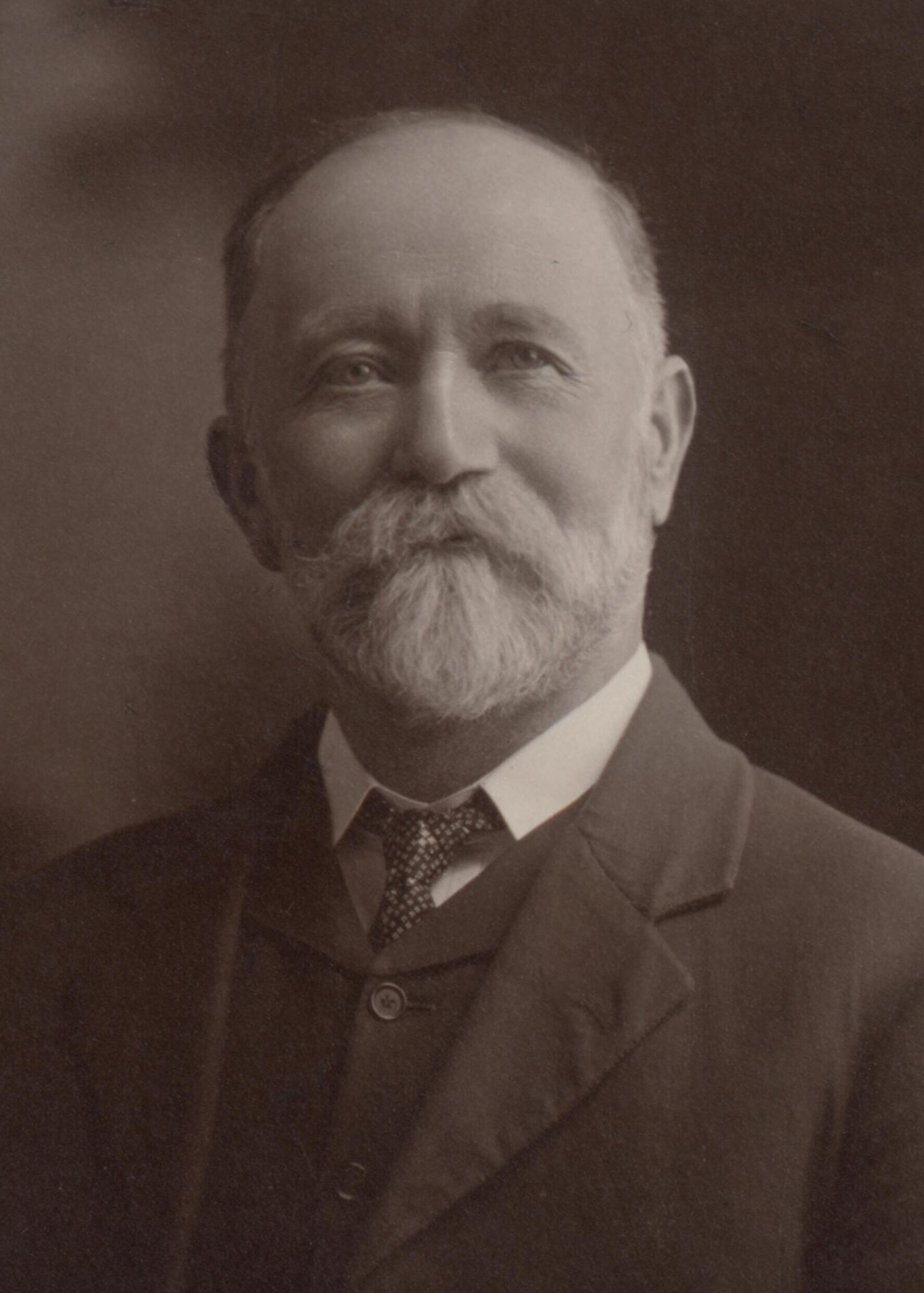
- Spence in 1908

Postmaster-General of Australia
- In office 17 September 1914 – 27 October 1915
- Prime Minister: Andrew Fisher
- Preceded by: Agar Wynne
- Succeeded by: William Webster

Member of the Australian Parliament for Darwin
- In office 30 June 1917 – 13 December 1919
- Preceded by: Charles Howroyd
- Succeeded by: George Bell

Member of the Australian Parliament for Darling
- In office 29 March 1901 – 5 May 1917
- Preceded by: New seat
- Succeeded by: Arthur Blakeley

Personal details
- Born: 7 August 1846 Eday, Scotland
- Died: 13 December 1926 (aged 80) Terang, Victoria
- Party: Labor (1901–17); Nationalist (1917–19)
- Spouse: Ann Jane Savage (m. 1871)
- Occupation: Unionist

William Guthrie Spence (7 August 1846 – 13 December 1926), was an Australian trade union leader and politician, played a leading role in the formation of both Australia's largest union, the Australian Workers' Union, and the Australian Labor Party.

== Early life ==
Spence was born on the island of Eday in the Orkney Islands, Scotland and migrated to Australia with his family as age six. He had no formal education and worked as a farm labourer in the Wimmera district of Victoria from the age of 13. Later he acquired a gold-mining licence and worked for various mining companies. In 1871, he married Ann Jane Savage.

In 1874, Spence was one of a number of militant mine-workers who formed the Amalgamated Miners' Association of Victoria, and he became the union's general secretary in 1882. He led the union into mergers with similar unions in the other Australian colonies, forming the Amalgamated Miners' Association of Australasia. In 1886, he became the first president of the Australian Shearers' Union; he also became president of its successor, the Amalgamated Shearers' Union of Australasia in 1887, and by 1890 most shearers in South Australia, Victoria and New South Wales had joined the union and 85% of the shearing sheds were open to union members only.

Around 1890, Spence became a strong proponent of Georgism. The Georgist 'Single Tax' proposal was at the time incredibly popular amongst Radical Liberals and the movement was highly influential in the political labour movement, the Australian Labor Party being created through the joint efforts of Single Taxers, socialists and trade unionists.

Since the Australian economy was expanding rapidly at this time and there was an acute shortage of labour, the unions were in a strong bargaining position and were able to secure great improvements in the living standards of Australia's rural working class. But a depression which began in 1891 led to acute class conflict as the mine owners and graziers tried to cut wages to remain solvent in the face of falling commodity prices, which the unions resisted. In 1894, Spence led the amalgamation of the miners, shearers and other rural workers into the Australian Workers' Union (AWU), Australia's largest and most powerful union. There were bitter strikes in the maritime and pastoral industries, in which Spence played a leading role, although he was generally a force for moderation in the labour movement. He was the AWU's secretary from 1894 to 1898 and president from 1898 to 1917.

== Political career ==
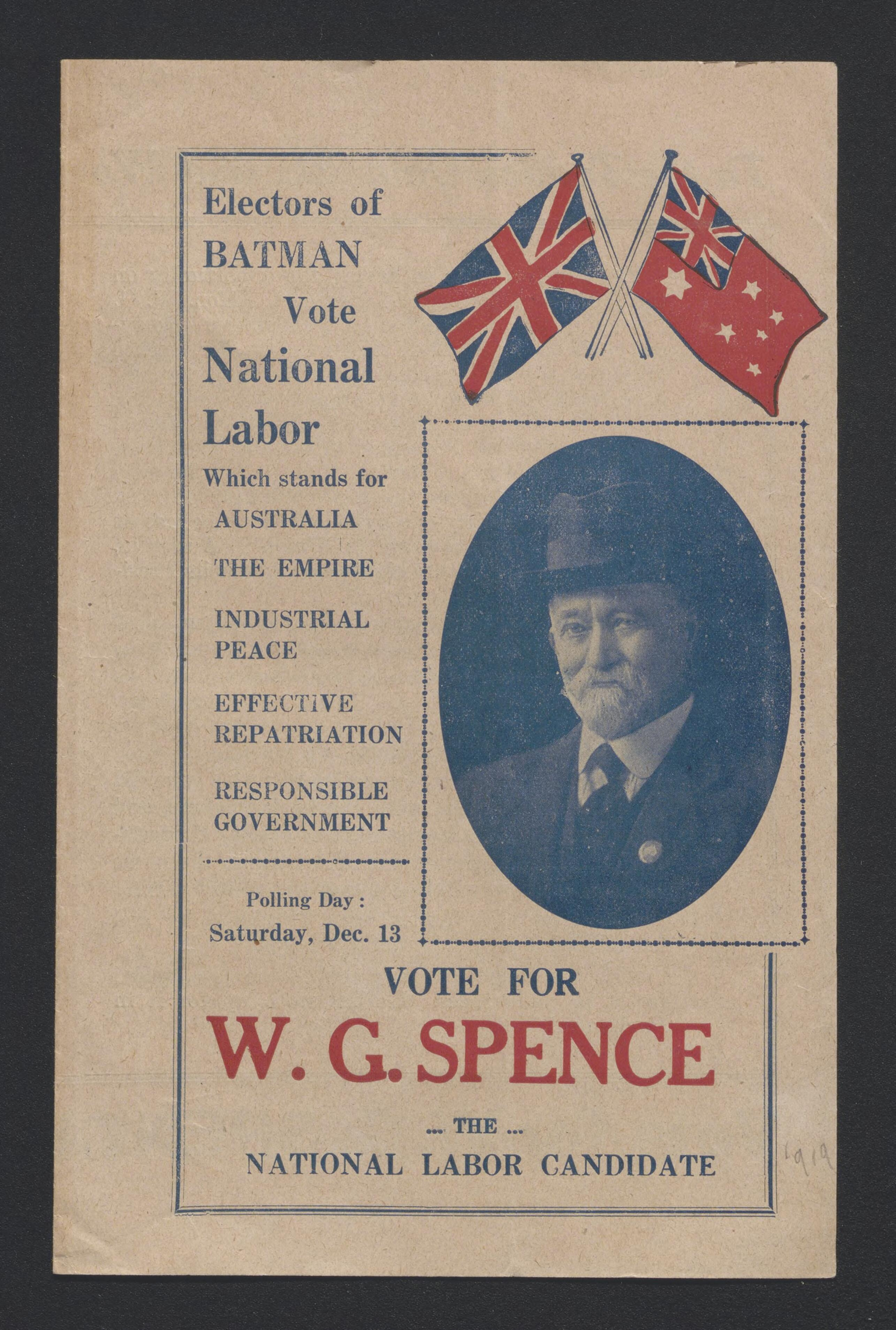
Campaign material used by Spence as a National Labor candidate at the 1919 federal election

The defeat of the strikes of 1891–1894 led Spence and other labour leaders to move into politics. Spence supported the formation of the Progressive Political League, an early labour party, in Victoria in 1891 and he was narrowly beaten at a by-election in 1892 for the seat of Dundas in the Victorian Legislative Assembly. In 1891, he supported the first election campaign by the Labour Party in New South Wales, which won a number of seats in the New South Wales Legislative Assembly. In 1898, Spence he became MP for Cobar in western New South Wales. He remained president of the AWU, making him one of the most powerful men in New South Wales politics. He described himself as "an evolutionary, not a revolutionary, socialist."

Unlike many in the labour movement, Spence supported the federation of the Australian colonies, and in 1901 he was elected to the first Australian House of Representatives as MP for the NSW Division of Darling. Like most of the older generation of labour leaders who were born in the United Kingdom, Spence was associated with the more conservative wing of the Australian Labor Party, led by Billy Hughes. He was not really suited to parliamentary life and did not hold office until he was appointed Postmaster-General in the third Fisher Ministry from September 1914 to October 1915. He was also appointed to the undemanding position of Vice-President of the Executive Council in the second Hughes Ministry from November 1916 to February 1917.

In 1916, Hughes decided to introduce conscription to maintain Australia's contribution to the Allied forces in World War I. Most of the Labor Party bitterly opposed this, but Spence sided with Hughes. As a result, he was expelled from the party along with Hughes and the other conscriptionist MPs. He was also deposed as president of the AWU and shortly after was expelled from the union. At the 1917 federal election, although Hughes was easily returned to power, Spence lost his seat, mainly because the AWU organised the rural workers to oppose him. Shortly after he was returned to Parliament at a by-election for the Tasmanian seat of Darwin. He was one of only a small number of people who have represented more than one state or territory in the Parliament. In 1919, he ran for the Melbourne seat of Batman, but was defeated.

== Personal life ==
In 1871, Spence married Ann Jane Savage, with whom he had five sons and four daughters; he was predeceased by two of his sons. His daughter Gwynetha married labour journalist Hector Lamond, with whom he later served alongside in federal parliament.

Spence died of pulmonary oedema at his son's home in Terang, Victoria, on 13 December 1926, aged 80. He was interred at Coburg Cemetery.

== Honours ==
In 1972, the Canberra suburb of Spence was named after him. In October 2003 the Australian Workers' Union named its Melbourne headquarters in Spence's honour.

Political offices
Preceded by Agar Wynne	Postmaster-General; 1914–1915	Succeeded by William Webster
Preceded by Albert Gardiner	Vice-President of the Executive Council; 1916–1917	Succeeded by Edward Millen
New South Wales Legislative Assembly
Preceded by Thomas Waddell	Member for Cobar; 1898–1901	Succeeded by Donald Macdonell
Parliament of Australia
New division	Member for Darling; 1901–1917	Succeeded by Arthur Blakeley
Preceded by Charles Howroyd	Member for Darwin; 1917–1919	Succeeded by George Bell
Trade union offices
Preceded by David Temple	General Secretary of the Australian Workers' Union; 1894–1900	Succeeded by Donald Macdonell
