= 1891 Australian shearers' strike =

Labour strike in Australia

1891 Australian Shearer's Strike
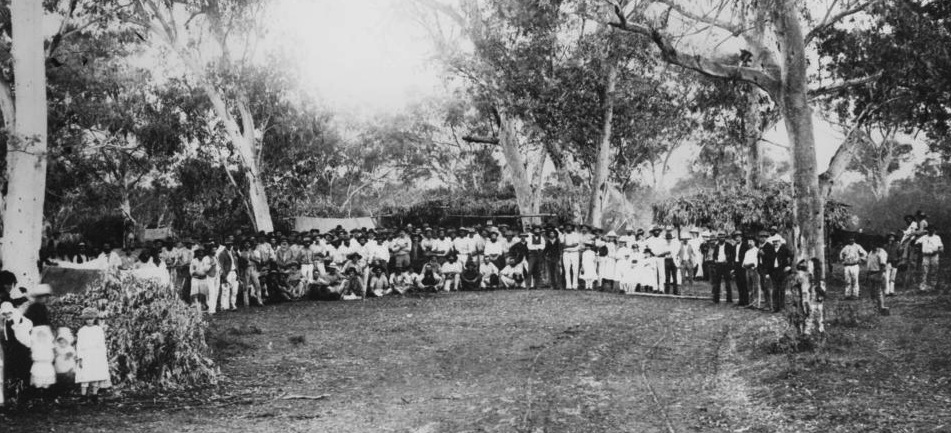
- Shearers' strike camp, Hughenden, central Queensland, 1891.
- Date: February 5 1891 – June 20 1891 (4 months, 2 weeks and 1 day)
- Location: Queensland, Australia
- Goals: Higher wages Closed shop agreements Ban on Chinese and South Sea Islander workers
- Methods: Strikes, protests, sabotage, demonstrations
- Result: Unsuccessful

Parties
Queensland Shearers Union; Amalgamated Shearers' Union of Australasia (Supporting)	Pastoralists Union of Queensland; Queensland Police; Queensland Defence Force

Number
8,500 unionists	1,000+ constables 1,000+ soldiers

The 1891 shearers' strike is one of Australia's earliest and most important industrial disputes.

The dispute was primarily between unionised and non-unionised wool workers. It resulted in the formation of large camps of striking workers, and escalating sabotage and violence on both sides. The strike was poorly timed, and when the union workers ran out of food, they were forced to come to terms. The outcome is credited as being one of the factors for the formation of the Australian Labor Party and the rise to power of a pro-Labor Party faction in the Australian Socialist League.

== Background ==
In 1891, wool production was one of the Australian continent's largest industries, however, working conditions for sheep shearers during the 19th century in Australia were consistently poor. With the growth of the wool industry, more workers became shearers and employees of the sheds and as their number and influence rose, many joined unions to campaign for better conditions.

By 1890, the Amalgamated Shearers' Union of Australasia boasted tens of thousands of members, and had unionised thousands of sheds. At their annual conference in Bourke in 1890, the Union laid down a new rule, which prohibited members from working with non-union workers. Soon after, shearers at Jondaryan Station on the Darling Downs went on strike over this issue. As non-union labour was still able to process the wool, the Jondaryan shearers called for help. The Rockhampton wharfies responded and refused to touch the Jondaryan wool. The unionists won the battle. The Australian Socialist League also involved itself directly with the shearers as the strike loomed (which would lead to its involvement in the foundation of the Australian Labor Party).

While the unions had grown in size significantly, the Amalgamated Shearer's Union of Australasia, the Queensland Shearers Union, and the Queensland Australian Labor Federation had depleted their bank accounts funding support for the unsuccessful 1890 Maritime Strike. The ASU alone had only £2,400 at the start of 1891 after spending almost £10,000 during the Maritime Strike. While there was encouragement by the success of the Jondaryan Station strike, union leaders were cautious about further strike action due to these depleted funds.

Inspired by the failed Maritime Strike, and galvanised by the Shearer's union success at Jondaryan, the Pastoralists Union of Queensland was formed in December 1890 to counter the strength of the unions.

== The strike ==
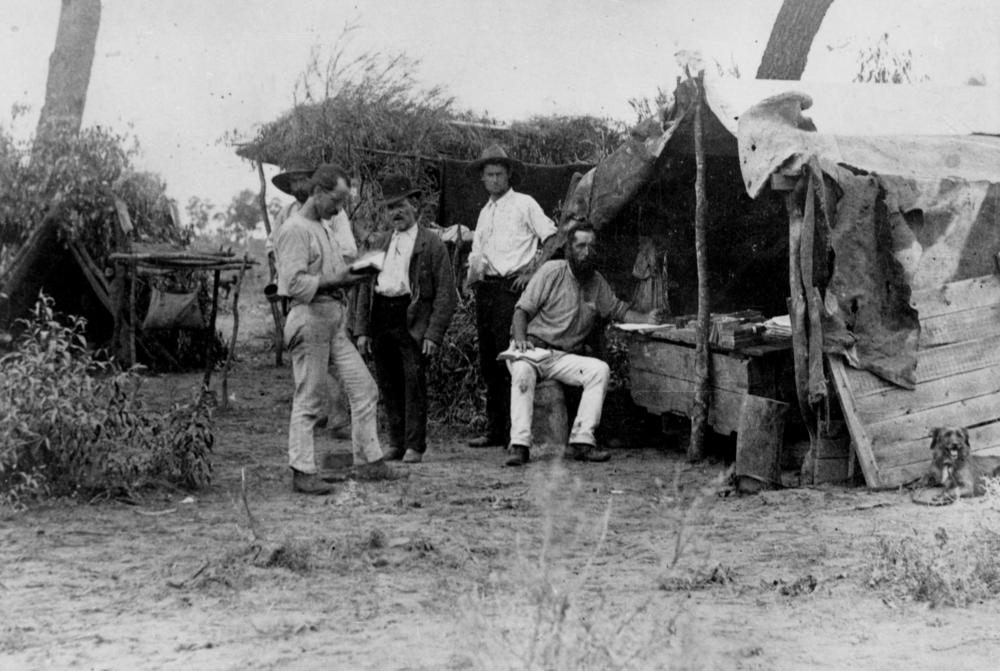
Workers' library at Barcaldine, during the strike.

Many union shearers were outraged when Logan Downs Station Manager Charles Fairbain asked the shearers to sign a contract that would reduce the power of their union. On 5 January 1891 the shearers announced a strike until the following demands for a contract were met:

- Continuation of existing rates of pay
- Closed shop agreements, mandating that union membership cards be provided by all shearers before starting work.
- Exclusion of Chinese and South Sea Islander labour, which manifested itself later as Labor Party policy - the White Australia Policy - although anti-Chinese demands were opposed by the Australian Socialist League, which was heavily involved with the strike.
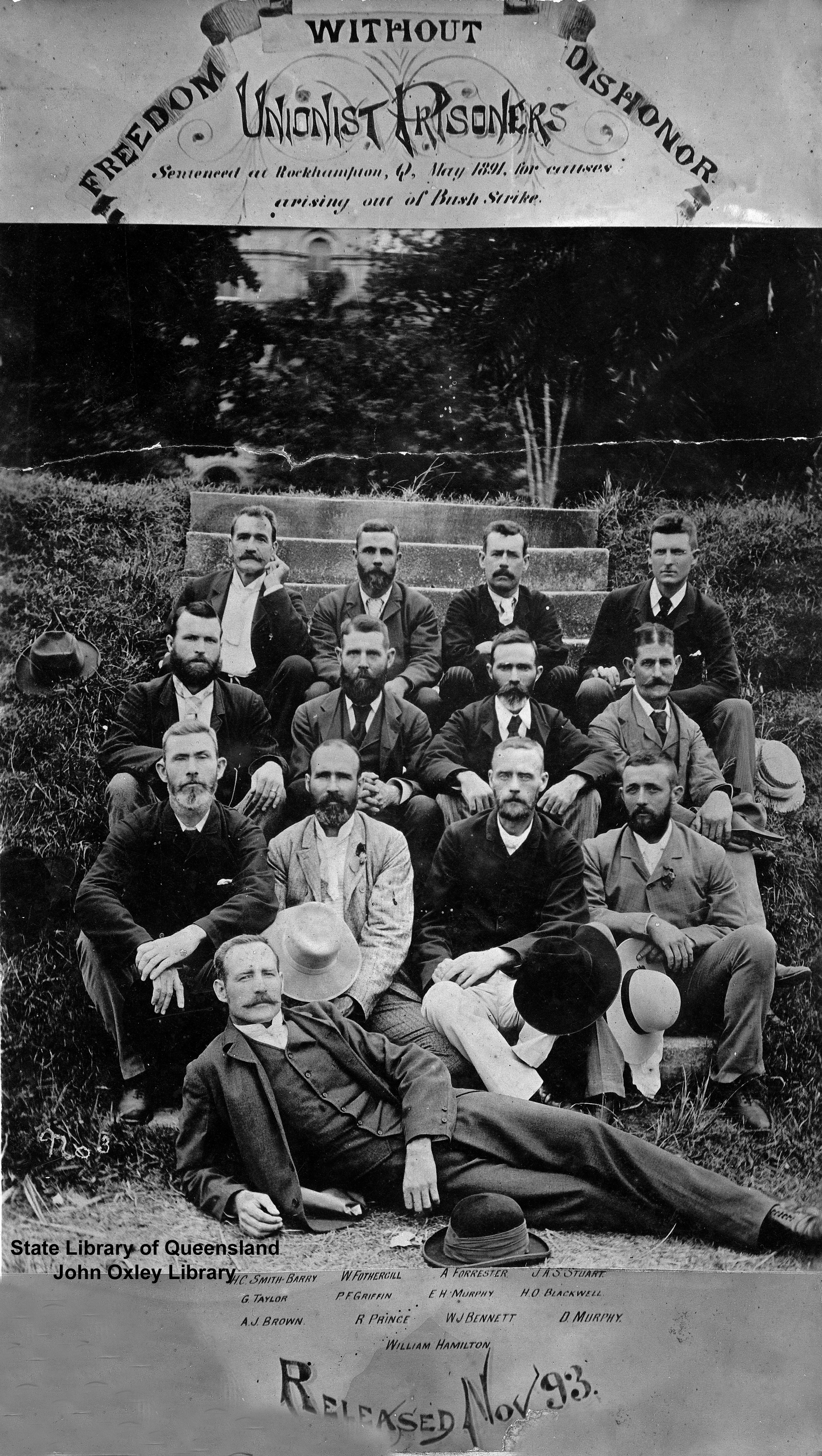
  Card celebrating shearers as Unionist Prisoners after the shearers strike in Barcaldine

The strike started and quickly spread. From February until May, central Queensland was on the brink of civil war. Striking shearers formed armed camps outside of towns. Thousands of armed soldiers protected non-union labour and arrested strike leaders. The unionists retaliated by raiding shearing sheds, harassing non-union labour and committing acts of sabotage, although the incidents of actual violence or arson were few.

One of the first May Day marches in the world took place during the strike on 1 May 1891 in Barcaldine. The Sydney Morning Herald reported that 1,340 men took part of whom 618 were mounted on horse. Banners carried included those of the Australian Labor Federation, the Shearers' and Carriers' Unions, and one inscribed 'Young Australia'. The leaders wore blue sashes and the Eureka Flag was carried. The "Labor Bulletin" reported that cheers were given for "the Union", "the Eight-hour day", "the Strike Committee" and "the boys in gaol [jail]". It reported the march:

In the procession every civilised country was represented doing duty for the Russian, Swede, French, Dane etc, who are germane to him in other climes, showing that Labor's cause is one the world over, foreshadowing the time when the swords shall be turned into ploughshares and Liberty, Peace and Friendship will knit together the nations of the earth.

But the shearers were unable to hold out. The summer had been unseasonably wet, and the strike was poorly timed for maximum effect on the shearing season (winter). By May the union camps were full of hungry penniless shearers. The strike had been broken. The squatters had won this time, but it had proved a costly exercise.

Thirteen union leaders were charged with sedition and conspiracy, taken to Rockhampton for the trial, convicted, and sentenced to three years in jail on St Helena Island Prison. Three of those imprisoned (William Hamilton, Julian Stuart, and George Taylor) later became Labor members of parliament – Hamilton in Queensland and the other two in Western Australia.

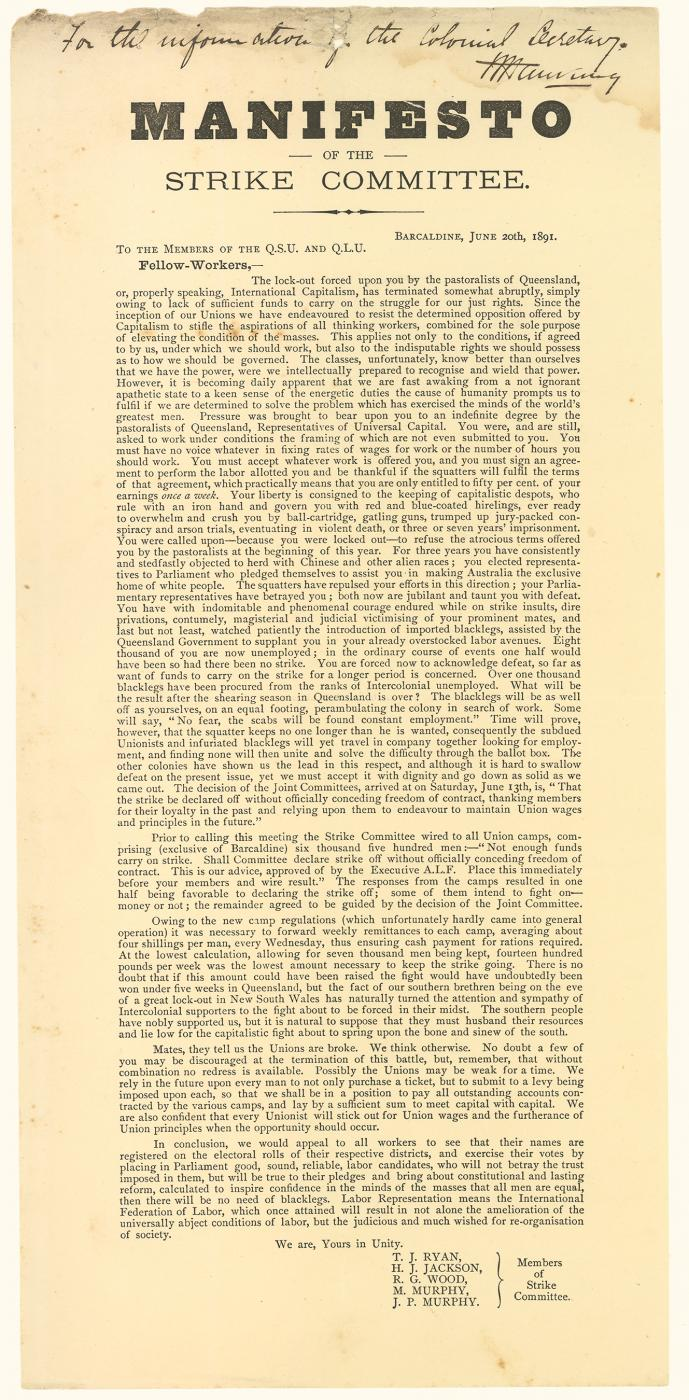
Shearers' Strike Manifesto, 1891

The 1891 shearers' strike is credited as being one of the factors for the formation of the Australian Labor Party. On the 9 September 1892 the Manifesto of the Queensland Labour Party was read out under the well known Tree of Knowledge at Barcaldine following the Great Shearers' Strike. The State Library of Queensland now holds the manifesto.

In 2008 the historic document was added to UNESCO's Memory of the World Australian Register and in 2009, the document was added to UNESCO's Memory of the World International Register.

== Literary references and allusions ==
Henry Lawson's well known poem, Freedom on the Wallaby, was written as a comment on the strike and published by William Lane in the Worker in Brisbane, 16 May 1891. And William Lane wrote his novel in 1892, The workingman's paradise, with two aims: to support fundraising efforts for the imprisoned unionists, and to explain unionism and socialism to those who would listen.

It has been suggested that Banjo Paterson's song Waltzing Matilda, an unofficial Australian anthem, was written about this era of shearers' industrial disputes in Queensland.

It was the subject of the play Hail Tomorrow and radio serial Two Worlds both by Vance Palmer. The strike was the background to the popular stage musical Reedy River.

Helen Palmer's song 'The Ballad of 1891', set to music by Doreen Jacobs, details the lead up to the strike and aftermath.

The 1975 film Sunday Too Far Away, directed by Ken Hannam has been partly inspired by the events surrounding this strike.

Playwright Errol O'Neill wrote On the Whipping Side – a play about the 1891 shearers' strike. This was first performed by the Queensland Theatre Company in 1991 and toured parts of Queensland.

== Legacy ==
The site of the striking shearers' campsite in Barcaldine is listed on the Queensland Heritage Register.

== See also ==
- 1894 Australian shearers' strike
- Australian labour movement
- Eureka Stockade
