= Queensland Shearers Union =

- Merged into: Amalgamated Workers' Union
- Founded: 1887
- Dissolved: 1891
- Location: Australia
- Members: 3,271 (1890)

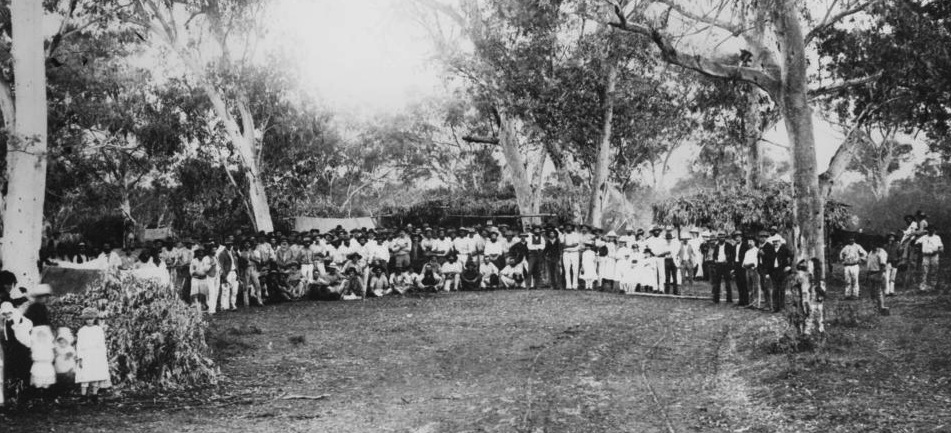
A strike camp at Hughenden, 1891

The Queensland Shearers Union was one of the first Australian unions, founded in the latter half of the nineteenth century. The union was instrumental in the development of the 1891 Australian shearers' strike, seen today as a key development in the Australian labour movement. Together with other unions the Queensland Shearers Union was the genesis of the Australian Workers' Union.

== Origin ==
In 1886, the shearers began to organise themselves, following a strike that had started at Wellshot Station and spread to surrounding properties. The Queensland Shearers Union was formed at Blackall in 1887. By 1890, the union represented almost three thousand workers, and 3,721 were registered by the end of the year. Strike camps were formed when no landowner in the area was willing to accept the workers on their conditions. The following year saw the landowners or pastoralists join forces to fight the new unionism. By this time the Queensland Shearers Union had tens of thousands of members and at a conference they declared that union members were not to work alongside non-union workers. In response, pastoralists organised to form the United Pastoralists Association of Queensland in December 1890.

Conflict between the two groups, which also involved police, squatters and soldiers, arose at many towns across Queensland. Initially other unions did not support the Queensland shearers and the strike was not successful. The union had a victory in 1890 when, together with wharf labourers and members of the British Seamen's Union, they successfully blockaded the transport of wool bales in Brisbane. The union was displeased with the engagement of non-unionist labour at Jondaryan.

== Strike ==
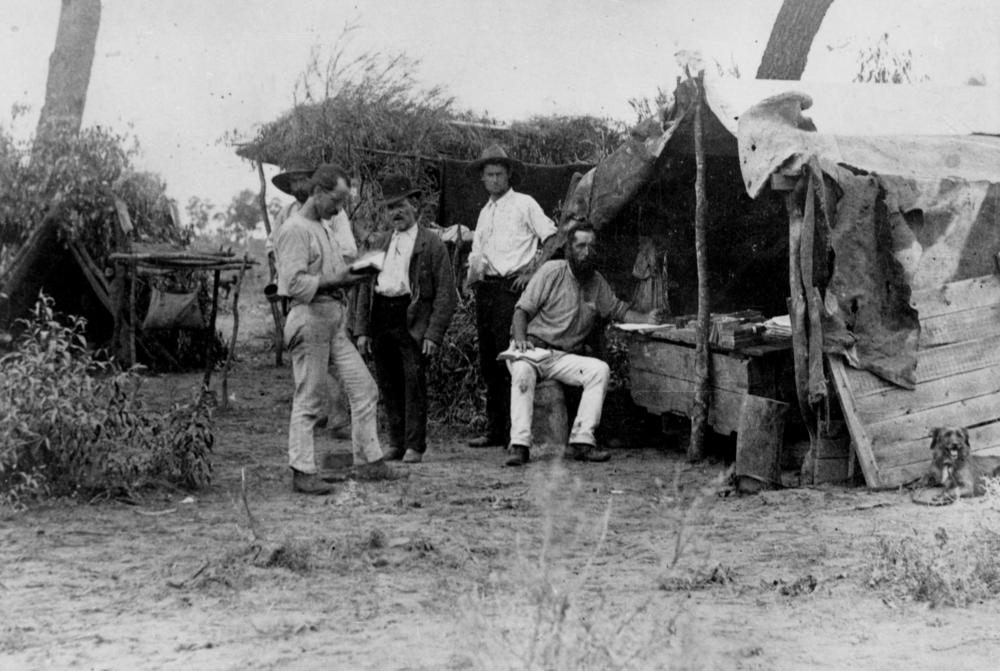
A strikers' library, 1891

At conferences in late 1890 in Sydney and Melbourne, the pastoralists agreed to lower wages, extend work hours and retain the right to withhold wages until the end of the season. These conditions were first enforced in Queensland by the United Pastoralists Association with unionists rejecting them. The first strike camp of 1891 Australian shearers' strike was set up at Clermont in Central Queensland on 6 January 1891. Shearers and workers at stations affiliated with the United Pastoralists Association also rejected the new conditions and formed more camps. Together with the Central Queensland Carriers Union and the Central Queensland Labourers' Union, the Queensland Shearers Union called for a strike. They organised meetings, processions and protests.

After a general call-out to members of other unions in March 1891, arrests were made and in the following months many strike leaders were convicted of conspiracy. Almost all of the executive members of the Queensland Shearers Union were imprisoned. A number of those who were jailed later went on to become Members of Parliament. The most notable of those was Anderson Dawson who became Premier of Queensland in 1899. His premiership was a first for the Australian Labor Party as well as the first parliamentary socialist government anywhere in the world.

== Aftermath and legacy ==
The Queensland Shearers Union joined with the Queensland Labourers' Union to form the Amalgamated Workers' Union in December 1891. The Amalgamated Workers' Union merged with the Australian Workers' Union and became the Queensland branch of the Australian Workers' Union fourteen years later.

== See also ==
- List of trade unions
- Tree of Knowledge
