= Albert Kai-Wing Ng =

Albert Kai-Wing Ng O.Ont, FRGD, FGDC
- Born: 1950 (age 75–76); Hong Kong
- Citizenship: Canadian
- Known for: graphic design

Albert Kai-Wing Ng, OOnt (伍啟榮; born 1950 in Hong Kong) is a prominent graphic designer who lives and works in the Greater Toronto Area in Ontario, Canada. He is known as the "Father of Canadian graphic design accreditation" and is currently an adjunct professor at York University.

Albert Ng was born and educated in Hong Kong and emigrated to Canada in 1974. He was a past president of the Ontario chapter of the Society of Graphic Designers of Canada, the founding president of the Association of Registered Graphic Designers, and a vice-president of Icograda during the 1995–1997 term.

His notable commissions include the Mississauga Chinese Centre stamp in 2013 and other stamp designs for Canada Post.

Albert Ng is the second graphic designer to be inducted into the Order of Ontario.

== Honours ==
2008 – listed in Canadian Who's Who 2008

2007 (December) – Order of Ontario

2006 - Fellow, The Association of Registered Graphic Designers of Ontario

2005 - Chinese Canadian Legend Award

1996 - Fellow, The Society of Graphic Designers of Canada
