= David Berman =

David Berman may refer to:

- David Berman (mobster) (1903–1957), Jewish-American mobster
- David Berman (musician) (1967–2019), American singer-songwriter, poet, cartoonist, and member of Silver Jews
- David Berman (graphic designer) (born 1962), Canadian author and graphic designer
- David Berman (actor) (born 1973), American actor and researcher on CSI: Crime Scene Investigation
