= Chartered Society of Designers =

British professional organization for designers

- Formation: 1930; 96 years ago
- Type: Learned society
- Legal status: Royal Charter granted 1976
- Headquarters: London, England
- Location: United Kingdom
- Members: 10,000 across all categories and in 34 countries
- Official language: English, Spanish, French, Italian
- President: Jake Leith PPCSD
- Key people: Maggie Law PPCSD (Honorary Secretary) D Callcott (PPCSD Honorary Treasurer) Frank Peters FCSD CDir FIoD(Chief Executive)
- Website: www.csd.org.uk

The Chartered Society of Designers (CSD) is a professional body for designers. It is the only Royal Chartered body of experienced designers. Its membership is multi-disciplinary – representing designers in all design, disciplines including Interior Design, Product Design, Graphic Design, Fashion and Textile Design.

== History ==
The origins of the Society can be traced back to 1898 and as far back as 1236 to the Guild of Peynters and Stainers.

The Society of Industrial Artists was formed in 1930 following an inaugural meeting at the Ye Olde Cock Tavern in London's Fleet Street. The first regional group formed in Stafford, West Midlands, in 1932. In 1951, the Society and its members took a leading role in the redesign of Britain after World War II. In 1963, it changed its name to Society of Industrial Artists and Designers.

In 1976, the Society of Industrial Artists and Designers was granted a Royal Charter in recognition of its role in establishing the profession of design. The Duke of Edinburgh became the Society's patron.

In 1986, The Society changed its name to Chartered Society of Designers, and set up The Design Business Association. In 1988, it incorporated the British Institute of Interior Design. In 2011, it was granted the power by HM The Queen Elizabeth to set up The Register of Chartered Designers and enabling the award of Chartered Designer.

In 2010, the CSD launched the Course Endorsement Programme (CEP), which was first accredited overseas, in Switzerland, in 2015. In 2016, it took over the management of the Prince Philip Designers Prize established in 1959 by its Patron The Duke of Edinburgh.

== Description ==
The Society is governed by Royal charter (granted in 1976). Members are obliged by a Code of Conduct to practice to the highest professional standards. CSD is a registered charity (UK Registered Charity Number 279393). Its Royal Patron was Prince Philip, Duke of Edinburgh.

CSD is not a trade body/association and functions as a learned society. Membership in the Society is awarded to qualified designers who demonstrate competence against CPSK (TM) (Creativity, Professionalism, Skills and Knowledge). Members are identified using the post-nominal letters, MCSD (TM) or FCSD (TM) (indicating Member or Fellow, respectively).

Other postnominals awarded by this Society include: HonFCSD, HonMCSD, Assoc.CSD, aCSDf, CSDm. All postnominals are registered trademarks.

The Royal Charter for this Society states: "The Society exists to promote concern for the sound principles of design in all areas in which design considerations apply, to further design practice, and to encourage the study of design techniques for the benefit of the community. To secure and promote a professional body of designers and regulate and control their practice for the benefit of the design industry and the general public."

The Chartered Society of Designers maintains the Register of Chartered Designers for the design profession and has Royal power to grant licences to design bodies and to award the title 'Chartered Designer' (a registered trademark).

The society's head office is at 1 Cedar Court, Royal Oak Yard, Bermondsey Street, London.

=== Interior design ===
- Office, shop, hotel, factory, public, commercial, and industrial interiors
- Domestic interiors
- Television, film and theatre design including sets, lighting and costumes

=== Exhibition design ===
- Exhibition and display including a permanent and temporary display
- Museum design

=== Fashion design ===
- Fashion and clothing including garments, bags, footwear, millinery and other accessories

=== Graphic design ===
- Type design, typography, lettering and calligraphy for reproduction
- Illustration
- Design for advertising
- Design for print including annual reports, brochures, books and magazines
- Design for two- and three-dimensional packaging
- Corporate identity
- Applied graphics including signing systems
- Vehicle livery and graphics on product design
- Architectural graphics
- Design for film, television or video reproduction including multi-sensual, time-based or still imagery
- Photography

=== Interactive media design ===
- Web sites, intranets and extranets
- Multimedia CD-ROMs, DVDs and kiosks
- Computer games
- Interactive elements for video DVDs
- Interactive elements for use within websites
- Interactive content for mobile devices

=== Product design ===
- Engineering based, three-dimensional products including capital goods, consumer goods, environmental and interactive information technology design
- Transportation/automotive design
- Furniture including contract, domestic, free-standing ranges and individual pieces
- Craft related products including ceramics, glass, jewellery, silver, cutlery, toys, souvenirs, travel and leather goods and decorative building elements

=== Textile design ===
- Surface pattern including printed textiles, printed carpets, patterned papers, patterns for ceramics and tiles
- Woven and knitted textiles including rugs and carpets, non-printed wall coverings, laminates

== Published works ==
A wide variety of articles and papewrs have been published under the various names of the Society.

The Minerva Medal is the highest award the Society can give to its members, usually for an overall lifetime achievement in design. Many who have received it are recognisable names, each having helped to raise the professionalism of design. The Medal is cast from sterling silver, bearing the profile of Minerva, Roman Goddess of Wisdom, Knowledge and Education, and the CSD logo.

List of Past Winners

Past winners include:

- Milner Gray FCSD (United Kingdom)
- Jan van Krimpen (Netherlands)
- Robin Day FCSD (United Kingdom)
- Tapio Wirkkala (Finland)
- Sir Gordon Russell FCSD (United Kingdom)
- Abram Games FCSD (United Kingdom)
- Pier Luigi Nervi (Italy)
- Ernest Race FCSD (United Kingdom)
- Edward Bawden (United Kingdom)
- Sir Misha Black FCSD (United Kingdom)
- Mary Quant FCSD (United Kingdom)
- Charles Eames (USA)
- Tomás Maldonado (Argentina)
- WM de Majo FCSD (United Kingdom)
- Eliot Noyes (USA)
- Robert Y Goodden (United Kingdom)
- Bill Brandt (United Kingdom)
- FHK Henrion FCSD (United Kingdom)
- Alex Moulton (United Kingdom)
- Dieter Rams (Germany)
- Philip Johnson (USA)
- Giorgetto Giugiaro (Italy)
- Sir Terence Conran FCSD (United Kingdom)
- Antti Nurmesniemi (Finland)
- Alan Fletcher FCSD (United Kingdom)
- Douglas Scott FCSD (United Kingdom)
- Milton Glaser (USA)
- Vico Magistretti (Italy)
- Jean Muir FCSD (United Kingdom)
- David Mellor FCSD (United Kingdom)
- James Gardner FCSD (United Kingdom)
- Tom Eckersley (United Kingdom)
- Mario Bellini (Italy)
- Tony Abbott (United Kingdom)
- Achille Castiglioni (Italy)
- Jeff Banks FCSD (United Kingdom)
- Saul Bass (USA)
- Kenneth Grange FCSD (United Kingdom)
- Lord Norman Foster FCSD (United Kingdom)
- Robin & Lucienne Day FCSD (United Kingdom)
- Alberto Alessi 2000 (Italy)
- The Duke of Edinburgh 2003 (United Kingdom)
- Lord Rogers of Riverside 2007 (United Kingdom)

The CSD Life Fund was established through the generosity of a group of CSD Fellows in 2000. Since then the fund has grown substantially through donations from other Society members. The aim of the fund is to make awards to members who have suffered severe hardship or trauma in order that they may be able to continue with design study or practice.

The Prince Philip Designers Prize was instigated by CSD's Patron, The Duke of Edinburgh in 1959 and was awarded annually until 2011. The award was made to a British designer or design-team leader whose exemplary work has had an effect on the perception of design by the public, and on the status of designers in society. A representative from the CSD, along with those from other design organisations, sat on the panel of judges who met at Buckingham Palace to determine the winner from a shortlist of inspiring designers in all fields of activity. The nominations were received from various professional bodies. The winner of the Prince Philip Designers Prize in 2005 was the influential graphic designer Derek Birdsall FCSD. Design engineer Alex Moulton and architect Edward Cullinan were both awarded special commendations. The award is currently under review, the last recipient being Quentin Blake CBE FCSD RDI who was nominated by the Society.

The Prize was re-instated by the Society in 2016. Prince Philip suggested and agreed on various changes to the Prize that build on its heritage in order to reflect today's design profession including opening the Prize to international nominations.

The Prince Philip Student Design Awards were also approved by the Society's Patron. The awards will be made to students across a range of design disciplines.

== See also ==
- British professional qualifications
- List of learned societies
