= David Berman (graphic designer) =

Canadian communication designer and author

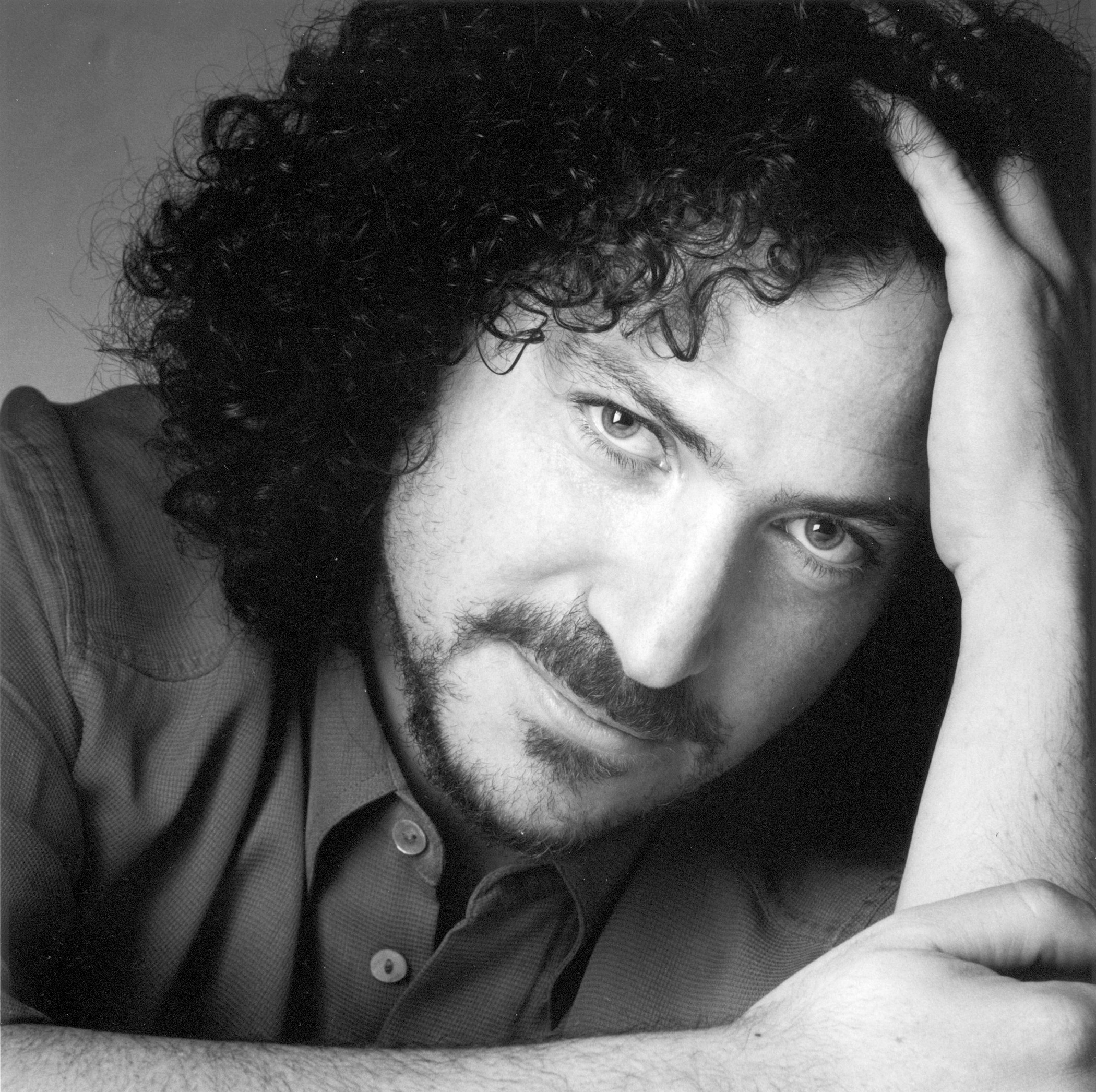
- Born: David Berman
- Citizenship: Canadian
- Education: University of Waterloo, Carleton University
- Occupations: Author, graphic designer
- Writing career
- Subjects: Social responsibility, environment, design, accessibility, ethics
- Notable work: Do Good Design
- Website: www.davidberman.com/dogood

David Berman, RGD, CGD, FGDC, CPWA is a Canadian communication designer, author, and speaker who has worked on accessible design and codes of ethics and standards for designers.

Berman studied at the University of Waterloo from 1975 to 1980. He then went on to study psychology and industrial design at Carleton University from 1980 to 1981. He became interested in plain writing and informational design, and has completed projects for state and national governments as well as a myriad of other high-profile publications and organizations including IBM, Canada's federal government, and the governments of Manitoba and Ontario. Berman holds (or has held) a number of different roles in his professional career including: President of David Berman Communications (1990–present), Ethics Chair/ National Vice-President for the Society of Graphic Designers of Canada (1999–2016), High Level Advisor for the United Nations UN-GAID (2009–present), Chair for the Carleton University Access Network (2012–present).

== Do Good ~~Design~~ ==
Do Good Design: How Design Can Change Our World (stylized as Do Good ~~Design~~~~)~~ is a book written by David Berman and published by Peachpit Press in 2009. It has since been translated into multiple languages, including Korean and Spanish. The book focuses on the ethics of design and the responsibility of designers to create positive impacts with their work.

== Berman Corner ==
The Berman Corner is a document design feature introduced by David Berman Communications to help improve access to digital versions of printed documents for people who are blind or have low vision. The feature consists of a 45-degree cut in one corner of a printed document. The cut serves as a tactile indicator that an accessible digital version of the document is available, typically through a nearby QR code. The design is intended to support inclusive document design by providing a physical cue that connects printed materials with digital alternatives.

== Publication ==
- The Apprentice, role-playing game magazine published between 1977 and 1980.
- Do Good Design with foreword by Erik Spiekermann, AIGA Press/Pearson/Peachpit/New Riders (book, 2009).
- HOW: Author and content advisor, Designing Change column (2010–2011).

== See also ==
- List of University of Waterloo people
