= Robert L. Peters =

Canadian graphic designer and educator (1954–2023)

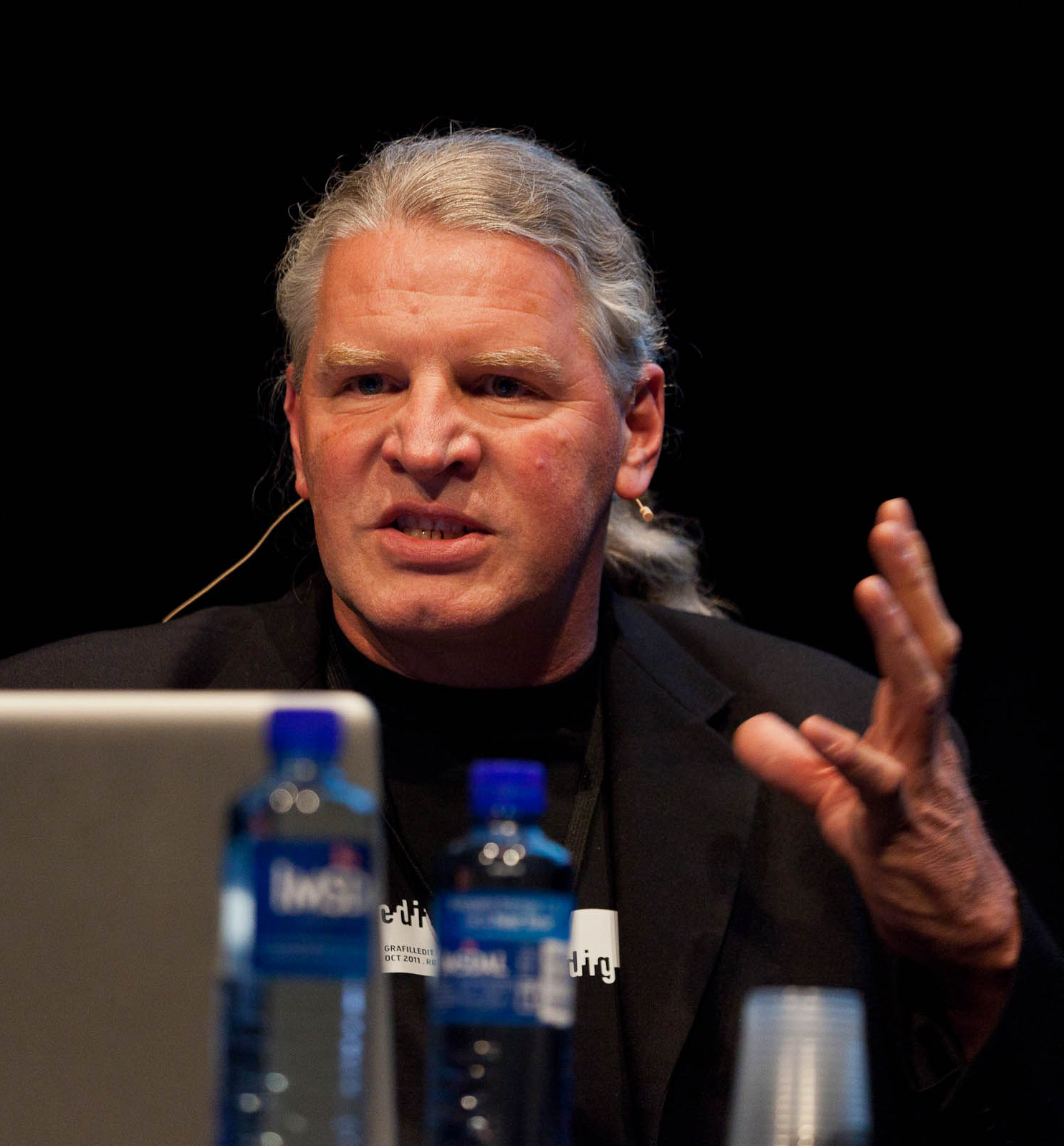
- Born: May 26, 1954; Steinbach, Manitoba, Canada
- Died: May 8, 2023 (aged 68)
- Occupation(s): Graphic designer Educator

Robert L. Peters (May 26, 1954 – May 8, 2023) was a Canadian graphic designer and educator.

== Background and personal life ==
Peters was born on May 26, 1954, in Steinbach, Manitoba, Canada to Mennonite missionary parents. His father John Jacob Peters, was born in Russia in 1920 and emigrated as a refugee in 1926, while his mother Amanda Marie Reimer, a direct descendant of Klaas Reimer, was born in Manitoba in 1926. During the Second World War, John Peters served Canada as a voluntary conscientious objector. The family moved to Europe in 1957, where Peters schooled bilingually in Frankfurt and Basel. Following a foundation art program in Basel, he graduated from Black Forest Academy (Lörrach), and then attended a year of religious studies at Capernwray Hall in the United Kingdom. He subsequently volunteered with Operation Palmbranch, an African relief mission based in Bavaria, Germany.

In 1974 Peters immigrated to Winnipeg, Canada where he married Beverly Guay Pauls, a Canadian he had met while studying in England; they divorced in 2001. He earned a two-year Graphic Design diploma from Red River College and a certificate in Design Management from the University of Manitoba. In 1980, Peters designed and built Solace House, an ultra-low-energy, passive solar house on a wooded acreage in Eastern Manitoba.

Peters died after a long battle with cancer on May 8, 2023, at the age of 68.

== Professional activities and affiliations ==
In 1976 Peters co-founded the design studio Circle Design Incorporated (CIRCLE), which received more than 60 awards for design excellence and has, in particular, designed numerous Canadian postage stamps and first day of issue covers.

From 1984 to 1986, Peters taught Creative Communications at Red River College. Between 1988 and 1993 he taught graphic design at the School of Art, University of Manitoba. Since the early 1990s he has been a guest lecturer on graphic design and visual communication at schools in North and South America, Asia, and Europe. Between 2004 and 2006, Peters was a guest lecturer at the International Centre for Creativity, Innovation and Sustainability in Hornbaek, Denmark. In 2006, Peters was co-holder of the University of Hartford’s Richard Koopman Distinguished Chair in Visual Arts. During this period Peters's students collaborated with students of Monash University's Russell Kennedy on the "Migrant Immigrant eXchange 2006" (MIX06) project with the aim of encouraging contemporary discourse between Indigenous peoples and non-Indigenous designers/collaborators in Australia and the USA.

Peters served on the executive of the Manitoba Chapter of the Association of Canadian Industrial Designers (ACID/M) before being elected its president in 1984. He was founding president of the Manitoba branch of the Society of Graphic Designers of Canada (GDC) from 1990 to 1992, and served on the GDC National Council until 1999. From 1994 to 1997 Peters served as a member of The Design Sector Steering Committee, Human Resources Development Canada. In 1998 the GDC named him a Fellow in recognition of his work in professional development and international design advancement. Since 2003 he has served on the GDC’s national Ethics Committee. Following the 1991 International Council of Graphic Design Associations (Icograda) World Design Congress in Montreal, Peters was designated as the GDC’s official delegate and liaison to Icograda at subsequent Icograda General Assemblies between 1991 and 1999. He was elected to the Icograda board from 1999 to 2005, served as Icograda's President from 2001 to 2003, and also served as official liaison between Icograda and the World Intellectual Property Organization (WIPO) as well as to the United Nations Educational, Scientific and Cultural Organization (UNESCO) from 2001 to 2005. In 2009, Peters received the Icograda President's Award as recognition of his service to the organisation. In 2013, Peters received the Icograda Achievement Award, the highest recognition granted by Icograda to designers for their contribution to the profession.

In 2000, Peters joined the board of the international humanitarian organization Design for the World (DW), and was appointed a Vice President in 2002. In 2004 he was named an Honorary Member of the Brno Biennale Association. He was a member of the founding executive of the International Design Alliance (IDA) from 2003 to 2005, served as a member of the advisory board of the Design Innovation Institute (Dii) and has acted as a special ambassador on behalf of the Taiwan Design Center. In 2010, Peters was appointed an ambassador for INDIGO (the International Indigenous Design Network).

== Selected articles and publications ==
Peters has been a regular foreign feature contributor to Communication Arts magazine since 1995, and has written for numerous international design publications including HOW, Print and the AIGA Journal. From 2002 to 2006 Peters served as editor of The Graphic Design Journal, published by the Society of Graphic Designers of Canada. Peters was a member of the editorial advisory group of Geez magazine. In 2009 he began serving on the Applied Arts magazine advisory board regarding design issues.

In 2005, Peters authored the book Worldwide Identity: Inspired Design from Forty Countries (ISBN 1-59253-187-3) published by Rockport in partnership with Icograda, and compiled and designed at Circle; the book showcases over 300 identities from 40 Icograda member countries around the globe. In 2008, Peters edited and published the book Gray Matter Graffiti: remnants of collections lost… an early gallery from some alleyways & other by-ways (ISBN 978-1-55383-196-9) by Vancouver poet Sam W. Reimer.

A podcast interview with Peters by 'Out of the Studio' (OOTS) was released in May, 2016.

== Sample works ==
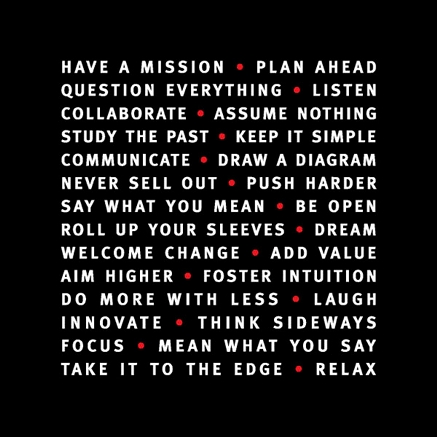
Maxim/Dictum: an in-house manifesto to “work by and live by,” designed at Circle (created in the late 1980s).

Poster designed in 2005 to promote alternatives to consumerism as espoused by Buy Nothing Christmas.

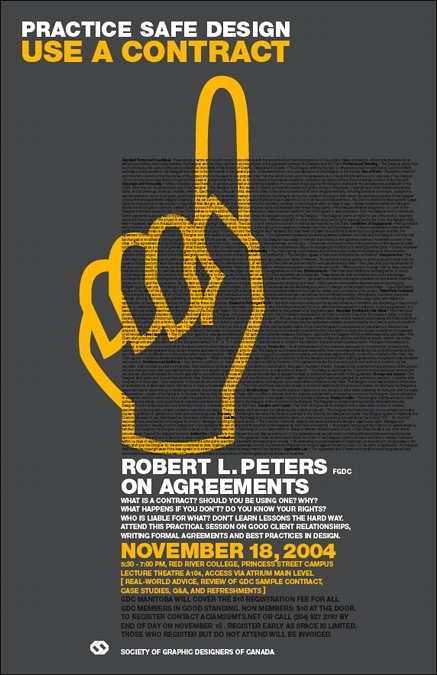
A poster designed to promote a 2004 presentation on the importance of preparing and using written agreements.

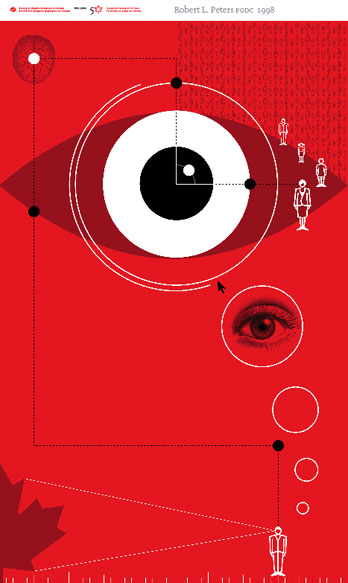
GDC@50 Poster design, in celebration of the event, GDC Fellows were asked to design a commemorative poster.
