= Société des designers graphiques du Québec =

- Abbreviation: SDGQ
- Founded: 1974
- Founder: Georges Beaupré, Roger Lafortune
- Type: Professional Association
- Registration no.: 1142549352
- Location: Montreal
- Region served: Quebec
- Members: 300
- Official languages: French
- Key people: President Philippe Lamarre
- Affiliations: Icograda, CIDQ, Mission Design, CICQ
- Website: sdgq.ca
- Formerly called: Société des graphistes du Québec (SGQ)

The Société des designers graphiques du Québec (SDGQ) is the provincial graphic design association in the Canadian province of Quebec. (Note: Regarding GDC and RGD’s relationship, Brooker (2013) noted that “In 2003, the GDC cut the cord. Henceforth, graphic design organizations would trundle forward behind the standard Canadian troika: Ontario, Quebec and the rest of the country.”) Its stated aim is to advance the profession of graphic design in Quebec and to help its members develop both professionally and financially. Its activities include professional development, co-organizing the Grafika design awards competition, lobbying, and the DGA certification program. (Note: Brooker (2013) notes specifically that compared to the GDC and the RGD, “In Quebec, the SDGQ undertakes a similar scope of activities, despite its smaller size.)

The SDGQ has a reconciliatory role in the debate on graphic design certification in Canada.

== History ==
The history of the SDGQ can be traced back to 1972 when Quebec graphic designers, Georges Beaupré and Roger Lafortune, formed a committee to found the Société des graphistes du Québec (SGQ). However, SGQ was not officially founded until 1974 when the new association was incorporated. In 1995 the SGQ replaced the word “graphistes” (graphic designers or graphic artists) in its name with “designers graphiques” (graphic designers), changing its name to Société des designers graphiques du Québec (SDGQ).

On June 14, 2011, during its annual general meeting, the SDGQ officially launched its certification program for graphic designers in Quebec.

In 2013 the SDGQ adopted a new visual identity, replacing its existing “dg” wordmark with a new “SDGQ” wordmark.

== Certification ==
SDGQ members working in the field of graphic design who have accumulated a minimum of 7 years of combined professional experience and education in graphic design can apply to be certified. Candidates are required to submit their portfolios to a panel of three DGA-certified judges for an anonymous review. During the review, the candidate's work is evaluated according to three criteria, namely, pertinence, responsibility, and creativity. Certified members are accredited with a Designer graphique agréé, DGA.

DGAs are required to follow SDGQ's code of ethics. There is a procedure in place to investigate DGAs who are accused of violating the code of ethics; violators can receive penalties up to and including having their DGA titles revoked.

A plan to align the DGA and RGD certifications was announced in 2012, and the written examination portion of the process was set to harmonize within 5 years. The DGA title is considered by the Association of Registered Graphic Designers to be the French equivalent of its RGD title.

== Affiliations ==
SDGQ is a member of Icograda, the Conférence interprofessionnelle du design du Québec (CIDQ), Mission Design, and the Conseil de l’industrie des communications de Québec (CICQ). It also has formal partnerships with the Society of Graphic Designers of Canada, the Association of Registered Graphic Designers of Ontario, and Infopress, a publishing company.

== Publications ==
SDGQ has published two books, the Guide de gestion et de pratique professionnelle du designer graphique (the graphic designer's guide to management and professional practice) for graphic designers in Quebec, and Devenir designer graphique : guide sur l'éducation en design graphique au Québec (becoming a graphic designer: a guide to graphic design education in Quebec).

SDGQ also publishes a blog called Œil pour œil, which has entered a period of hiatus since 2011.

== See also ==
- Society of Graphic Designers of Canada
- Association of Registered Graphic Designers
