= Frank Peters =

Frank Peters may refer to:

- Frank Peters (baseball) (1894–?), American baseball player
- Frank Peters (ice hockey) (1902–1973), professional ice hockey player
- Frank Peters (footballer) (1910–1990), former English football player
- Frank Peters (college president) (1920–1987), second president of Wilfrid Laurier University
- Frank Peters Jr. (1930–2007), American Pulitzer Prize-winning journalist
- Frank Peters (American football) (born 1947), American football player

== See also ==
- Frank Peeters (born 1947), Belgian fine art photographer
- Francis Peters (disambiguation)
