= Do Good Design =

Do Good ~~Design~~
- Cover of English edition
- Author: David B. Berman
- Language: English
- Subject: Marketing
- Genre: Non-fiction
- Publisher: Pearson Education (first edition), Peachpit Press (imprint)/New Riders/AIGA Press
- Publication date: January 2009
- Publication place: Canada
- Media type: Print (paperback)
- Pages: 192 (first edition)
- ISBN: 978-0-321-57320-9
- OCLC: 227921823
- LC Class: HF5413 .B47 2009

Do Good ~~Design~~: How Designers Can Change The World is a book by Canadian designer David B. Berman, with a foreword by Erik Spiekermann, published by Peachpit Press in January 2009. The book was co-published by the American Institute of Graphic Arts (AIGA).

The book was printed and bound by Courier, a company whose ethics and sustainability practices align with David Berman’s. The book was printed to minimise as much waste as possible. The paper manufacturer was also chosen for its sustainability practices, along with the publishers.

== Content ==
The book discusses graphic design, branding, and social responsibility, often in connection with environmentalism. Berman focuses especially on the effect of design in the developing world, the deeds and misdeeds of the Coca-Cola Corporation, and women in advertising. The book is divided into three sections:

=== The Creative Brief: Disarming the Weapons of Mass Deception ===
Berman first introduces the problems that the book will be focusing on: climate change and overconsumption. He details how design contributes to these problems through case studies. He then transitions to the next section by asking how change can be made.

=== The Design Solution: Convenient Truths ===
In this section, Berman further discusses the why and how of making change with design.

=== The Do Good Pledge ===
The book finishes with a call to action in which Berman urges readers to take his “Do Good” pledge, which is available on his website. By taking the pledge, professionals commit to: be true to their professions and themselves, and to spend at least ten percent of their professional time creating a positive impact.

Some ideas in Berman's book derive from those of Ken Garland, author of the First Things First manifesto in the 1960s. Garland was the first person (other than Berman himself) to take the Do Good Pledge on Berman's website.

== Editions ==
- Chinese language edition official release: Beijing, October 27, 2009 at World Design Congress, with foreword by Min Wang (head of graphic design Beijing Olympics, chief of design at Chinese Academy of Fine Arts).
- Korean language edition released July 2010.
- 2013 revised English-language edition
- Spanish language edition released July 2015.

== See also ==
- Adbusters
