= Francis Peters =

Francis Peters may refer to:

- Francis Edward Peters (1927-2020), academic
- F. H. Peters, college football coach

== See also ==
- Frank Peters (disambiguation)
