= Association of Registered Graphic Designers =

Canadian professional organization

- The Association of Registered Graphic Designers logo
- Founded: 1996
- Founder: Pauline Jarworski, Michael Large, Ivy Li, Helen Mah, Rod Nash, Albert Kai-Wing Ng, Rene Schoepflin, Robert Smith, Philip Sung
- Type: Professional Association
- Location: Toronto
- Official languages: English
- Affiliations: Ico-D
- Website: rgd.ca

The Association of Registered Graphic Designers (RGD or simply RGD; formerly ARGD/ON is a non-profit, self-regulatoryprofessional design association with over 3,000 members. It serves graphic design professionals, managers, educators and students. Created in 1996 by an Act of the Legislative Assembly of Ontario (Bill Pr56), the Association is Canada's only accredited body of graphic designers with a legislated title and the second such accredited body of graphic designers in the world. RGD certifies graphic designers and promotes knowledge sharing, continuous learning, research, advocacy and mentorship.

== Advocacy ==
RGD works to establish professional standards and innovative thinking within the graphic design industry. The association assumes an advocacy role for best practices for both graphic designers and the clients they work with. They focus on issues such as spec work and crowdsourcing, accessibility, sustainability, salaries and billing practices, pro bono work and internship guidelines.

RGD advocacy initiatives include:

- Supporting, defending and maintaining policies
- Promoting measures that broadly benefit members and the industry
- Increasing public awareness and disseminating information about industry best practices and the value of working with a Registered Graphic Designer (RGD)
- Arguing in favour of a new idea
- Speaking out on issues of concern
- Mediating, coordinating, clarifying and advancing a particular point of view
- Intervening with others on behalf of the profession

== History ==
In 1956, Toronto-based designers Frank Davies, John Gibson, Frank Newfeld and Sam Smart formed the Society of Typographic Designers of Canada (TDC). The TDC was later renamed the Society of Graphic Designers of Canada (GDC) to reflect the wider interests of its members.

By 1984 many other design disciplines such as Architecture and Interior Design had been given Acts in Provincial Legislatures so that their respective associations could govern and grant their members exclusive professional designations. RGD's founders recognized the need to align Graphic Design with other design professionals. To ensure Graphic Design could also advance as an acknowledged profession the Association's founders decided to incorporate the Association of Registered Graphic Designers (RGD).

On April 25, 1996, Bill Pr56 was passed and Royal Assent was given to an Act Respecting The Association of Registered Graphic Designers by the Legislative Assembly of Ontario. Sponsored by Mrs. Margaret Marland, Member of Provincial Parliament and signed by the Honourable Hal Jackman C.M., O.Ont., O.ST.J., B.A., L.L.B., L.L.D., Lieutenant-Governor of the Province of Ontario.

In 1999 a separate Examination Board was established to administer the Registered Graphic Designers Qualification Examination, now referred to as the Certification Process for RGD.

=== Founders ===
- Pauline Jarworski
- Michael Large
- Ivy Li RGD Emeritus
- Helen Mah FGDC
- Rod Nash RGD Emeritus
- Albert Kai-Wing Ng O.Ont., RGD, FGDC
- Rene Schoepflin RGD Emeritus
- Robert Smith RGD
- Philip Sung RGD Emeritus

== Membership ==
In order to obtain the Registered Graphic Designer (RGD) designation, designers must complete a Certification Process that includes an application to determine eligibility, a multiple-choice online test, and a virtual portfolio interview. The RGD designation signifies knowledge, experience and ethical practice, guaranteeing that a designer is professionally competent in the areas of accessibility, business, design principles, research and ethics.

RGD offers various forms of membership for professional practitioners, managers, educators and students in graphic design, and for persons in allied professions.

== Conferences ==
RGD organizes three annual conferences: a two-day design conference called DesignThinkers, a one-day career development conference for students and emerging designers called Creative Directions, and a one-day Design Educators Conference.

== Publications ==
RGD has published three editionsThe Business of Graphic Design: The RGD Professional Handbook. It has also published AccessAbility: A Practical Handbook on Accessible Graphic Design and publishes a biennial National survey of graphic design salaries & billing practices.

== Related organizations ==
- Société des designers graphiques du Québec (SDGQ)
- AIGA
- Design Council
- Icograda
