= Douglas Scott (designer) =

British industrial designer (1913–1990)

Douglas William Scott (1913–1990) was a British industrial designer, best known for his work on the AEC Routemaster bus and the AGA cooker.

He also designed the GPO Pay On Answer STD equipment, which started replacing the old Button A and Button B equipment in UK phoneboxes when STD was launched in 1959

He was a Fellow of the Chartered Society of Designers and winner of the prestigious Minerva Medal in recognition of this outstanding contribution to the design industry.
