= Jake Leith =

English designer

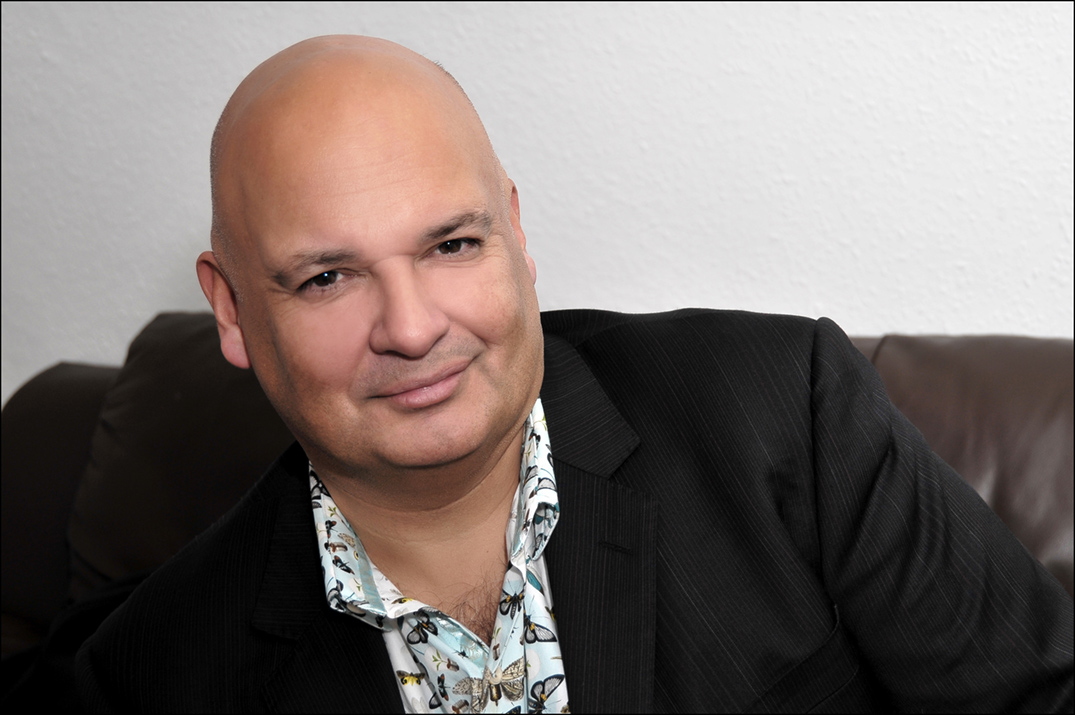
Leith in 2015

Jake Leith is the principal designer of The Jake Leith Partnership.

== Early life ==
Born on 18 November 1958 in Bushey, Hertfordshire, Jake studied at Loughborough College of Art and Design, graduating with a BA(Hons) in Printed Textiles in 1981. Subsequently, in 1982, he completed an MA in Textiles & Fashion at the Birmingham Institute of Art and Design.

== Early career ==
His professional career began in India as an Export Designer for Everest Fabrics, based in Uttar Pradesh, North India, designing and manufacturing printed furnishing fabrics and interior textiles for markets in Asia, Europe and North America. The latter included the design and supply of furnishing fabrics to Jack Lenor-Larsen in New York.

Free-lance work during this period included designing for International Linen and Liberty of London, and the Taj Hotel Group of India.

In 1984, Leith returned to the UK and became a Textile Advisor/Interior Designer for Europa Shop Equipment. Design projects included: Pineapple Dance Studios and Parrish of Newcastle. He co-founded the design consultancy Fantasy Finishes in 1985, specialising in paint finishes, murals and design-to-order wall-coverings. Clients included Monsoon, Anokhi, Oasis Trading and Vaux Breweries.

== Jake Leith Partnership ==
Since 1986 he has been the senior partner of the interior design company, The Jake Leith Partnership. Particular areas of expertise include, furnishing fabrics, wallcoverings and surface pattern - ranging from wrapping paper to stained glass.

Interior contracts have included: Barratt Homes, Beazer, BP, barristers' chambers at Lincoln's Inn and Gray's Inn, Intersport, Planmasters UK, SAS Holdings, Connections in Design and Communications Management.

== Professional practice in design education ==
During the 1990s, Leith realised that business & professional practice was not a recognised area of study on most UK art & design courses. So he introduced such a programme at Loughborough University School of Art & Design, aiming to equip students with a range of transferable skills, qualities and attitudes to prepare them for life beyond graduation in the creative industries. In 1998 he was asked to co-ordinate Business & Professional Practice across the faculty. In 2003, he joined the University of Brighton and led Business & Professional Practice at the university's School of Art, Design & Media until June 2017. The role was combined with that of Academic Programme Leader for the Fashion & Textiles Programme, on four separate occasions.

Since September 2017 Leith has been tasked with developing and managing new employability and skills programmes for the not-for-profit organisation Skillsmax including contracts for the Department for Work & Pensions (DWP). This has included the support of recent UK Design Graduates who had found themselves unemployed due to the COVID-19 pandemic.

On 17 November 2022 he introduced the inaugural CEP22 Forum, taking place on the third day of the International Virtual Design Education Forum #VDEF22. The symposium brought together design practitioners, tutors and students to discuss current design practice and education and how they can collaborate. Leith then went on to give a presentation on Professional Practice in the Design Curriculum, a view of why and how professional practice should be included in the learning experience.

== Chartered Society of Designers ==
Since 1983 Leith has been an active member of the Chartered Society of Designers (CSD), he was made a Fellow in 1995, a Member of Council and Trustee in 1997, Chair of the Fashion & Textile Group in 2002, a member of the executive committee in 2003, and was elected vice president in 2004 and Honorary Secretary in 2008.

On 30 November 2011, at the 36th AGM of the CSD, he was elected president of the society, having served as president-elect for the previous two years; Leith completed his term of office on 5 December 2013.

In June 2012 Leith received the Freedom of the City of London and admission to the Livery of the Worshipful Company of Framework Knitters. He was invited by the Livery Company to sit on their education committee in 2016.

Nine years later on 27 November 2020, at the 45th AGM, Leith was elected for a second term as president of the CSD.

== Research ==
Jake Leith's research focuses on workforce development within the design industry, developing new high-level skills for practitioners, continuing professional development from student to practitioner, and practice focused staff development for teacher practitioners. His research aims ‘to understand how the eLearning method of teaching delivery can contribute to flexibility of learning in design-led practice based courses Can E-learning Enhance Practice-based Design Courses? 1 through examining how the adoption of online learning and teaching techniques on practice-based courses, within the field of art and design, has often been seen as controversial, due to the vocational nature of the discipline.

His research also focuses on informing ‘HE’s understanding of the role of teacher-practitioners. 2 On the Co-working Project (2011) he explored the experiences of fashion and textile teacher-practitioners in HE, and observed how they facilitate student learning and enhanced student employability in the fashion and textiles industry.

Leith contributed to two papers entitled ‘Guidance for the Employability Leads’ (2011) and ‘Employability & Enterprise’ (2012), University of Brighton. The papers offered guidance within the schools and central departments regarding employability.

In March 2012, he co-ordinated and chaired the ‘From Learning to Earning’ Conference in Brighton, a collaboration between the Chartered Society of Designers & University of Brighton, following a successful bid for funding from the Higher Education Academy. The conference explored whether professional accreditation of designers through a structured pathway and continuing professional development would address some of the issues surrounding how design is evaluated and qualified and in particular challenging the reliance on viewing a portfolio as the only means for making such a choice.

In July 2012 Leith gave a public lecture entitled ‘The Changing face of Marketing within the Fashion Sector’ as part of the Festival of Learning and has been an invited panel member at the MDHUB Opinions debate in Brighton entitled What positive inspiration is growing out of Sussex's creative revival? 3

In 2016 he collaborated with the Brighton and Sussex Medical School team from January through to October, planning, designing and curating an exhibition to raise the awareness of Scabies as a significant problem in homes for the elderly in the South East of England. The exhibition was part of an ongoing project at the Brighton and Sussex Medical School at the University of Sussex. 4

== British Council ==
Throughout 2013 Jake Leith was responsible for leading the Fashion Business International Development Initiative for The British Council in collaboration with The University of Brighton, in Saudi Arabia, Nigeria and Morocco. The requested focus from the British Council and the governments of the countries involved was SME/micro business development through innovation and entrepreneurship. This ongoing programme aims to give an understanding of key areas in the Global Fashion Industry business providing practitioners and students with the knowledge required to successfully carve a career in the sector.

== Sources ==
1 Leith, J.Q., Zara, J.M. and McInnes, M. (2011) Can E-learning Enhance Practice-based Design Courses? In: Greener, Susan and Rospigliosi, Asher, eds. 10th European Conference on e-Learning. University of Brighton, Brighton, pp. 399–407. ISBN 9781908272225

2 Leith, JQ and McInnes, M (2011) Co-working, exploring the ways teacher-practitioners shape students’ learning experience in fashion and textiles higher education. In: Clews, D. (Ed) 2011. Stepping Out: Studies on Creative and Cultural Sector Engagement with Arts HE. UKADIA (United Kingdom Arts and Design Institutions’ Association) 2011 Conference, 8 February 2011, Sadler's Wells, London. ISBN 978-0-9558978-5-6

3 What positive inspiration is growing out of Sussex's creative revival?

4 Haffenden, Victoria and Leith, Jake (2016) Sanctuary? Scabies and other afflictions along life's pilgrimage

- Jake Leith Profile at University of Brighton Centre for Research & Development (2017)
- Gullen, Z & Sefton, D. Debrett's People of Today (1995–present) Debrett's Limited. ISBN 1-870520-32-7
- Rains, S. Dictionary of International Biography (1996–present) Routledge, ISBN 1-903986-19-2
- Chartered Society of Designers Website (2017)
