= The Apprentice (magazine) =

Canadian magazine about role-playing games

The Apprentice is a Canadian magazine about role-playing games that was edited and published by David Berman.

== Publication history ==
Berman published The Apprentice in Ottawa from 1977 to 1980, before going on to study at university. Content included reviews of role-playing resources available to players in the early days of the hobby, interviews with industry personalities, pieces of fiction, adaptations of well-known literary works to role-playing systems, and role-playing adventures.

== Reviews ==
In the January 1979 edition of Dragon (Issue #22), Gary Gygax was savage in his criticism of the second issue of The Apprentice. He lambasted the magazine for incorrectly attributing publication of Dragon to TSR Hobbies rather than TSR Periodicals, found the published role-playing adventure, which concerns a flock of magically enlarged pigeons, to be "for the birds", and excoriated Berman for interviewing one of Gygax's chief rivals, Ken St Andre, designer of Tunnels & Trolls. Gygax concluded that it was unlikely that Berman "will ever reach the status of journeyman, let alone master."

A year later, in the January 1980 edition of Dragon, Gygax was considerably more complimentary about the fifth issue of The Apprentice, saying that it was "very good for an amateur magazine." Gygax complimented the magazine on various articles he found interesting. His only criticism this time was Berman's use of the acronym FRP (fantasy role-playing), which Gygax thought was "quite acceptable to hard-core game hobbyistst but they help to form a meaningless jargon to newcomers and the general public." He concluded that this magazine was "one of the better buys amongst amateur and semi-pro magazine offerings. If it continues to improve as rapidly as this, it will become a factor in the professional ranks in a year or so."
