= Frank Peters (college president) =

Canadian college president

Frank Cornelius Peters (July 5, 1920 – October 7, 1987) was the second president of Wilfrid Laurier University. He held the position from 1967 to 1978.
