= Willy de Majo =

Graphic designer (1917–1993)

Willie de Majo (born William Maks de May; 25 July 1917 – 17 October 1993) was a graphic designer.

De Majo is widely known as the founder of the International Council of Graphic Design Associations (ICOGRADA), and as a vocal supporter of the professional status of designers, playing a significant role advocating for the design profession internationally.

His archive is located at the University of Brighton Design Archives.

== Education and early career ==
De Majo was born in Vienna on 25 July 1917. After undertaking his training at the Vienna Commercial Academy (Wiener Handelsakademie), de Majo founded a design business in Belgrade in 1935. In 1939, de Majo moved to Britain and joined the BBC as a broadcaster for their overseas service.

== World War II ==
From 1941 to 1943, de Majo served with the Royal Yugoslav Air Force attached to the Royal Air Force. In 1944 he was with the War Ministry in London, and between 1945 and 1946, he was with the RAF at Supreme Headquarters, Allied Expeditionary Force. De Majo was awarded a military MBE for his service.

== Post-War ==
Following the end the war, de Majo re-established his design practice - W. M. de Majo Associates - in London, offering graphic and exhibition design services, alongside corporate identity and product development. Clients at this time included British Overseas Airways Corporation and British South American Airways for whom he designed posters, and Charles Letts & Co Ltd for whom he designed address books and diaries.

De Majo designed the museum exhibition at Baden-Powell House, London, which was opened by Queen Elizabeth II in 1961.

== Festival of Britain ==
In 1951, de Majo was the co-ordinating designer of the ‘Ulster Farm and Factory’ exhibition which was part of the Festival of Britain. The exhibition, held at Castlereagh, Northern Ireland told the story of how Ulster earned its living through agriculture and industry, and had as its central theme, the continuing tradition of craftsmanship and skill in farm and factory.

== ICOGRADA ==
In 1963 de Majo became the first president of the International Council of Graphic Design Associations (ICOGRADA), an organization he founded with Peter Kneebone, recognizing “the need to create meaningful international dialogue around the future trajectory of graphic design.”

De Majo chaired the ICOGRADA Congresses in Zürich (1964) and in Bled (1966). A film was made of the Congress in Bled - ICOGRADA 66 (1966) - for which de Majo wrote the commentary.

== Awards ==
In 1969 de Majo was awarded the SIAD Design Medal for International Services to Design and the Profession. He also received various awards from international design associations including the commemorative medal of ZPAP, the Association of Polish Designers and honorary membership of the Dutch GVN Graphic Designers Association.

He was also made an Honorary Fellow of the Society of Typographic Designers.

== External links and further reading ==
- Breakell, Sue and Whitworth, Lesley, Émigré Designers in the University of Brighton Design Archives, Journal of Design History, Vol. 28, No.1, March 2013
- Woodham, Jonathan, Local, National and Global: Redrawing the Design Historical Map, Journal of Design History, Vol. 18, No. 3, Autumn 2005
