= Pieter Brattinga =

Dutch graphic designer (1931–2004)

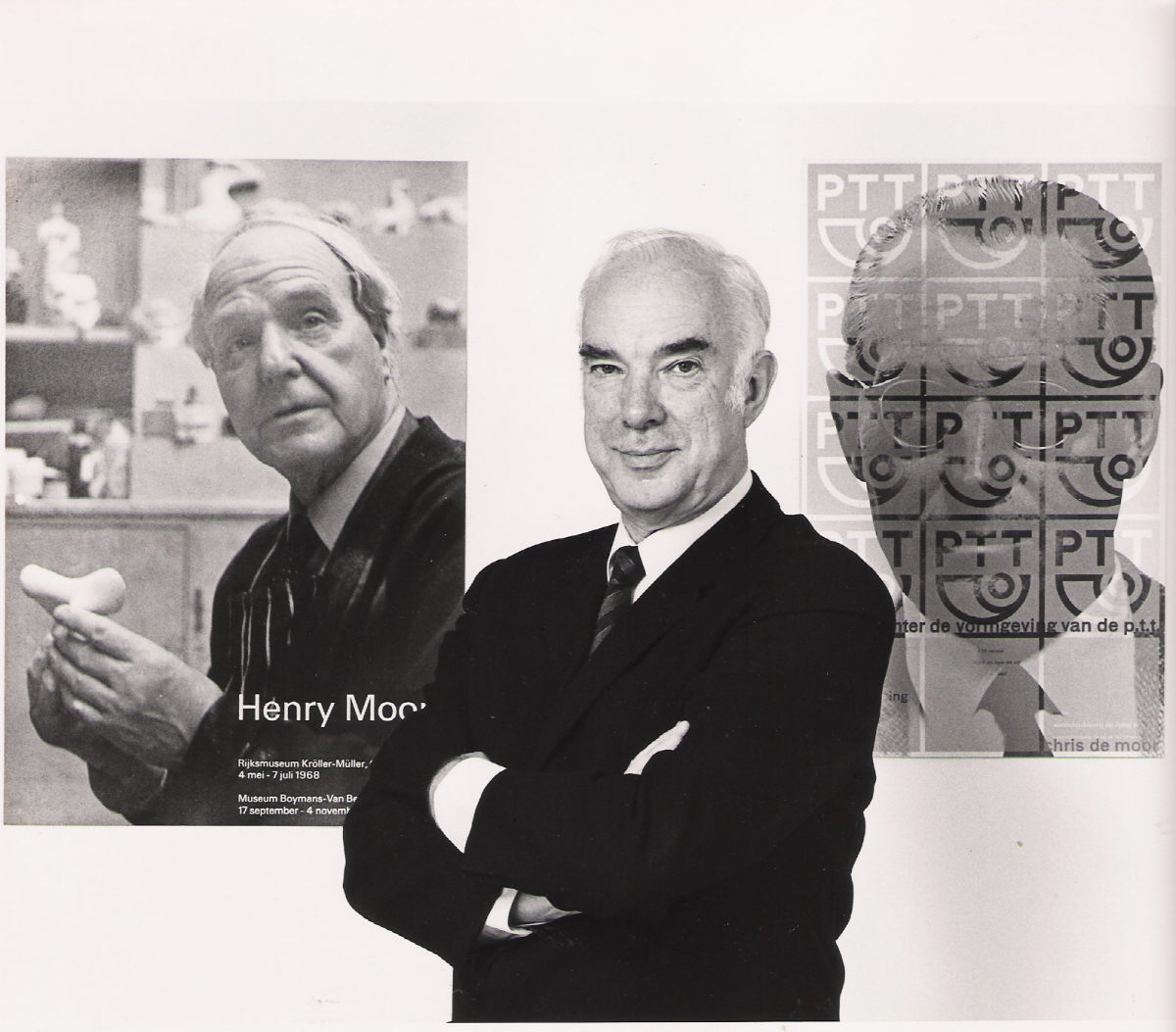
Pieter Dirk Brattinga

Pieter Dirk Brattinga (January 31, 1931, Hilversum – July 8, 2004, Barneveld) was a Dutch graphic designer.

From 1951 until 1974, he was director of design at Steendrukkerij De Jong & Co in Hilversum.

Between 1960 and 1964, he was professor and chairman at the visual communications faculty at the Pratt Institute in Brooklyn, New York.

He and Dick Dooijes wrote the book 'History of the Dutch Poster 1890–1960' (1968)

== Prizes ==
1998 - Grafische Cultuurprijs
