= Design Professionals of Canada =

Organization

The Design Professionals of Canada
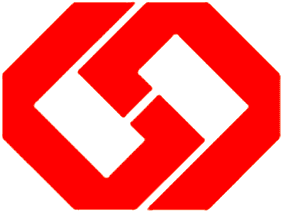
- GDC logo, designed by Jacques Emile Charette, in use from 1968 to 2014.
- Abbreviation: DesCan
- Founded: 1956
- Founder: Frank Davies, John Gibson, Frank Newfeld, Leslie Smart
- Type: Professional Association
- Registration no.: 0994952
- Location: Ottawa, Ontario, Canada
- Region served: Canada
- Official languages: English, French
- Key people: President Amanda Parker, Certified Design Professional
- Affiliations: ico-D
- Website: descan.ca
- Formerly called: Society of Typographic Designers of Canada; Society of Graphic Designers of Canada

Design Professionals of Canada (or DesCan, formerly known as the Society of Graphic Designers of Canada, or GDC) is Canadaʼs national certification body for graphic and communication design and since 1956 has established standards for design professionals, educators, and leaders. DesCan licenses and certifies members whose services meet the standardized, national criteria. DesCan was Canada's first distinct group to professionalize graphic design as a distinct field.

== History ==
In 1956 designers Frank Davies, John Gibson, Frank Newfeld, and Leslie (Sam) Smart met in Toronto to form the Society of Typographic Designers of Canada (TDC).

In 1968 the organization changed its name to the Society of Graphic Designers of Canada (GDC) with the Federal Charter approved on in 1976, unifying the country under one national association.

In 1996 GDC's five Ontario Chapters combined to form the Association of Registered Graphic Designers of Ontario and received provincial legislation granting them authority to use the title of Registered Graphic Designer and the R.G.D. designation within the province of Ontario.

GDC celebrated its 50th anniversary in 2006 with a commemorative stamp from Canada Post.

In 2021 the organization changed its name to the Design Professionals of Canada (DesCan) to more accurately reflect a broadening variety of membership.

Today DesCan has chapters throughout Canada and has representation in every province and territory as well as many international members.

=== Friends and Affiliates of DesCan ===
DesCan is well-respected internationally and is a member of the International Council of Design (ico-D), the worldwide non-governmental body representing graphic and communication designers, allowing members to attain international recognition, professional development, and a global perspective on graphic design. DesCan is one of the ten largest association members in ico-D and has been a member since 1974.

DesCan is also allied with the Societe des Designers Graphiques du Quebec (SDGQ), representing graphic designers in Quebec, the university and College Designers Association (UCDA), the Canadian Association of Professional Image Creators (CAPIC), and the Australian Graphic Design Association (AGDA).

In 2010 the organization adopted membership changes to replace the MGDC and LGDC certifications with a new CGD™ certification in order to reduce confusion over the meaning of the MGDC designation. The CGD certification mark was replaced with CDP™ in 2021.

== Activities ==
The DesCan maintains a national certified body of graphic and communication designers and promotes standards of graphic design and ethical business practices for the benefit of Canadian industry, commerce, public service and education.

Through the media, publications, seminars, events, conferences and exhibits, the DesCan builds awareness of graphic and communication design and its essential role in business and society.

From 1977, initially in British Columbia and then across Canada, Graphex has provided a design competition.

Since 1960, the DesCan has been recognizing as Fellows those designers who make major contributions to Canadian graphic design. Designers who have received the honour include Allan Fleming (1960), Burton Kramer (1975), Chris Yaneff (1983), Paul Arthur (1996), Jim Rimmer (2007), and Mark Busse (2014).

== Organization ==
DesCan consists of ten chapters across Canada, facilitating a national, ongoing exchange of ideas and information for designers and students:

== Affiliations ==
DesCan is a professional member of ICoD (International Council of Design), the worldwide non-governmental body representing design professions. This provides DesCan members with the opportunity for international recognition, professional development, and a global perspective on graphic design.

The Société des designers graphiques du Québec (SDGQ), representing graphic designers in the province of Quebec, has a formal relationship with the GDC.

== CDP™ Certification ==
DesCan certifies and licenses members whose services meet the standardized, national criteria. The CDP™ certification mark is recognized across Canada as the mark of professional services and ethical business conduct. Current certification requirements and guidelines can be found at https://descan.ca/certification/.

== See also ==
- Association of Registered Graphic Designers
- Société des designers graphiques du Québec (in French)
