= International Council of Design =

International design organisation based in Canada

- Type: International organisation
- Established: 27 April 1963
- President: Melike Taşcıoğlu Vaughan
- Location: Montreal, Quebec, Canada
- Website: Official website

The International Council of Design (ICoD; formerly known as ico-D, International Council of Communication Design or Icograda, which was formerly an initialism for International Council of Graphic Design Associations) is an international organisation representing the professions of design. The Council was founded in London in 1963 and celebrated its 50th anniversary on 27 April 2013. It is a non-profit, non-partisan, "member-based network of independent organisations and stakeholders working within the multidisciplinary scope of design."

The membership of the Council is composed of national entities including professional design associations, design promotion bodies and design education institutions. Design media are affiliated through the International Design Media Network (IDMN).

== Members ==
The International Council of Design is an organisation of organisations. The council has over 120 Member bodies from over 50 countries. As a representative body, the Assembly of its Members is its highest power and has the ultimate decision on all matters that govern the council. The organisations that make up this membership are national-level Professional Associations, Educational Institutions and Promotional Bodies. As the core membership category, Professional Associations representing individual professional designers and design studios, have particular powers within the Assembly.

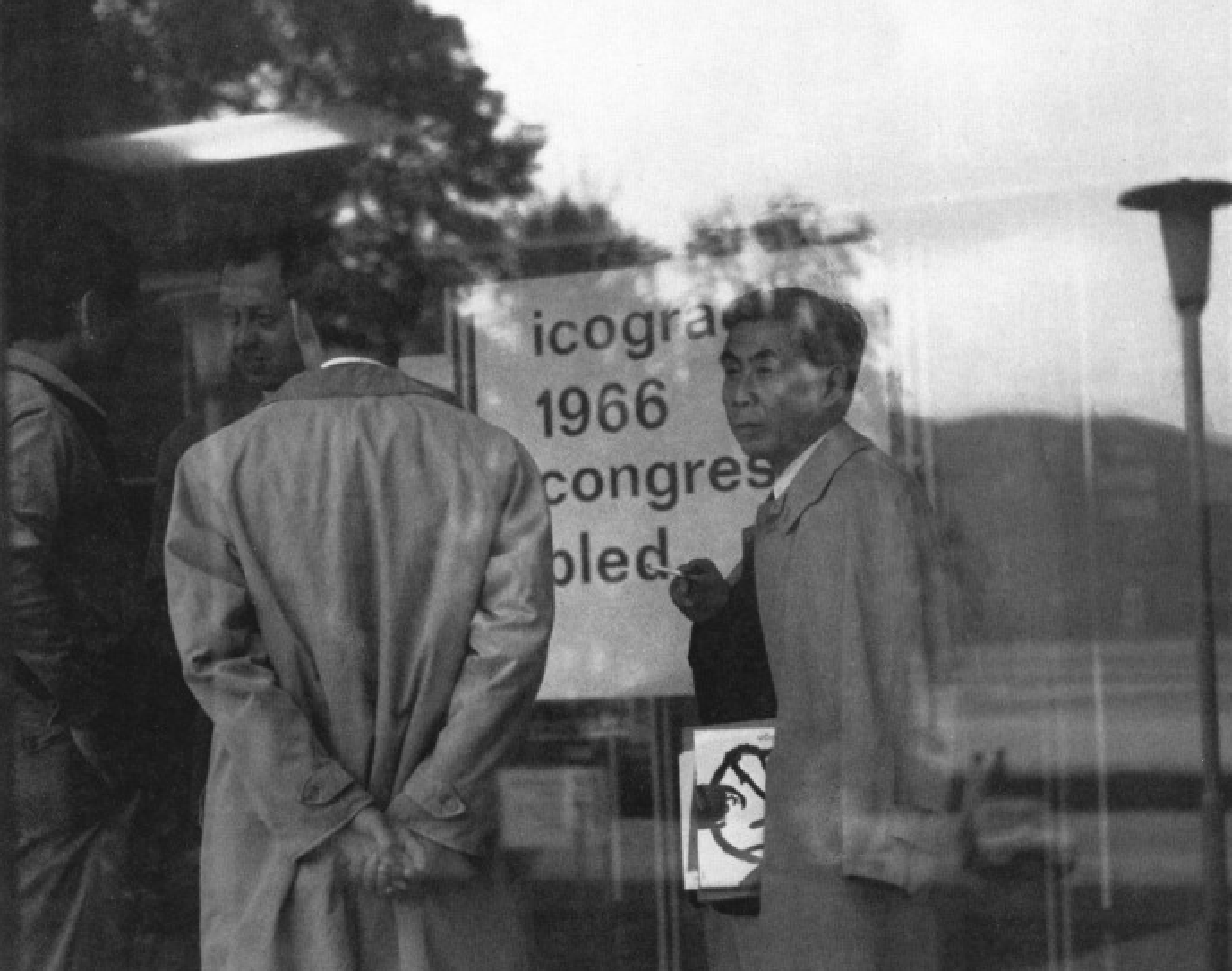
Icograda Congress 1966

== International affiliations ==
ICoD coordinates best international practices for professional design. It maintains affiliations with other international organisations such as Cumulus Association, IFRRO, ISO, UNESCO, UNIDO, WIPO, and ECOSOC.

== International meetings ==
As a way to establish inter-organisational cooperation, the International Council of Design provides a series of in-person touch-points between design organisations. ICoD Meetings offer a variety of ways for representatives of Members organisations and the design community to connect. ICoD Meetings are attended by, on average, 30-70 organisation representatives speaking on behalf of their design communities. There are several categories of Meetings that respond to specific needs.

ICoD Platform Meetings (PMs) gather ICoD Members at one place and time, every year, to explore common challenges and action for change. ICoD Regional Meetings (RMs) provide an opportunity for ICoD Members located in the same region to engage with the design community at the regional level on common topics and challenges. ICoD Special Meetings (SMs) foster collaboration and exchange between various promotion and valorisation entities (Design Weeks, Festivals, Museums, Cities, and more) to address overlapping challenges and objectives and to determine how the international design community can better collaborate to achieve mutual goals and tackle shared challenges.

ICoD General Meetings (GM) assemble Members on issues of governance and policy. The General Assembly (GA) and Annual General Meeting (AGM) happen on alternating years.

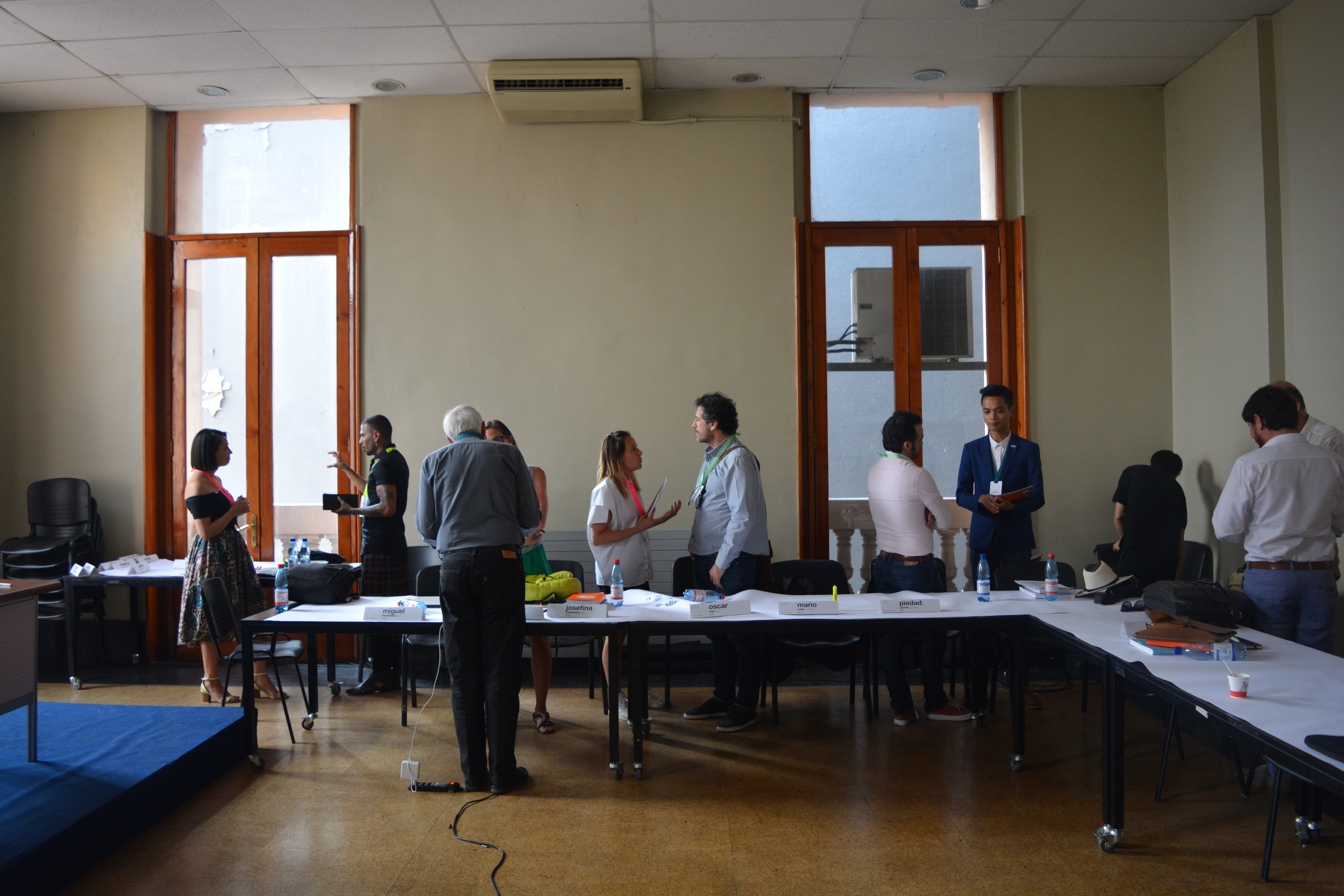
ICoD Regional Meeting 2017 Latin America

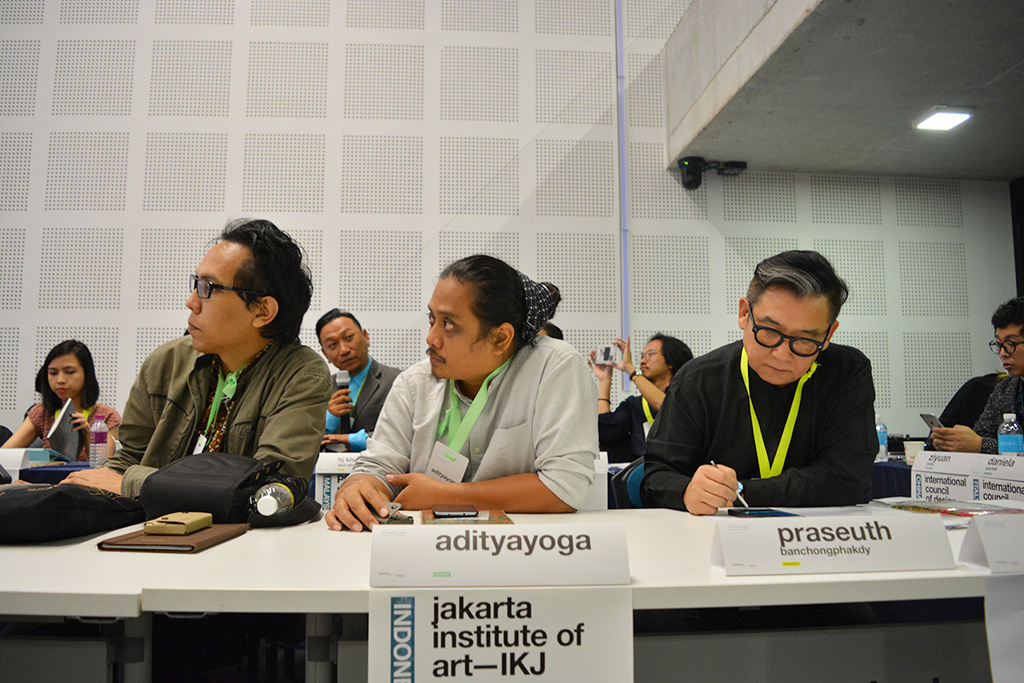
ICoD Regional Meeting 2017 ASEAN

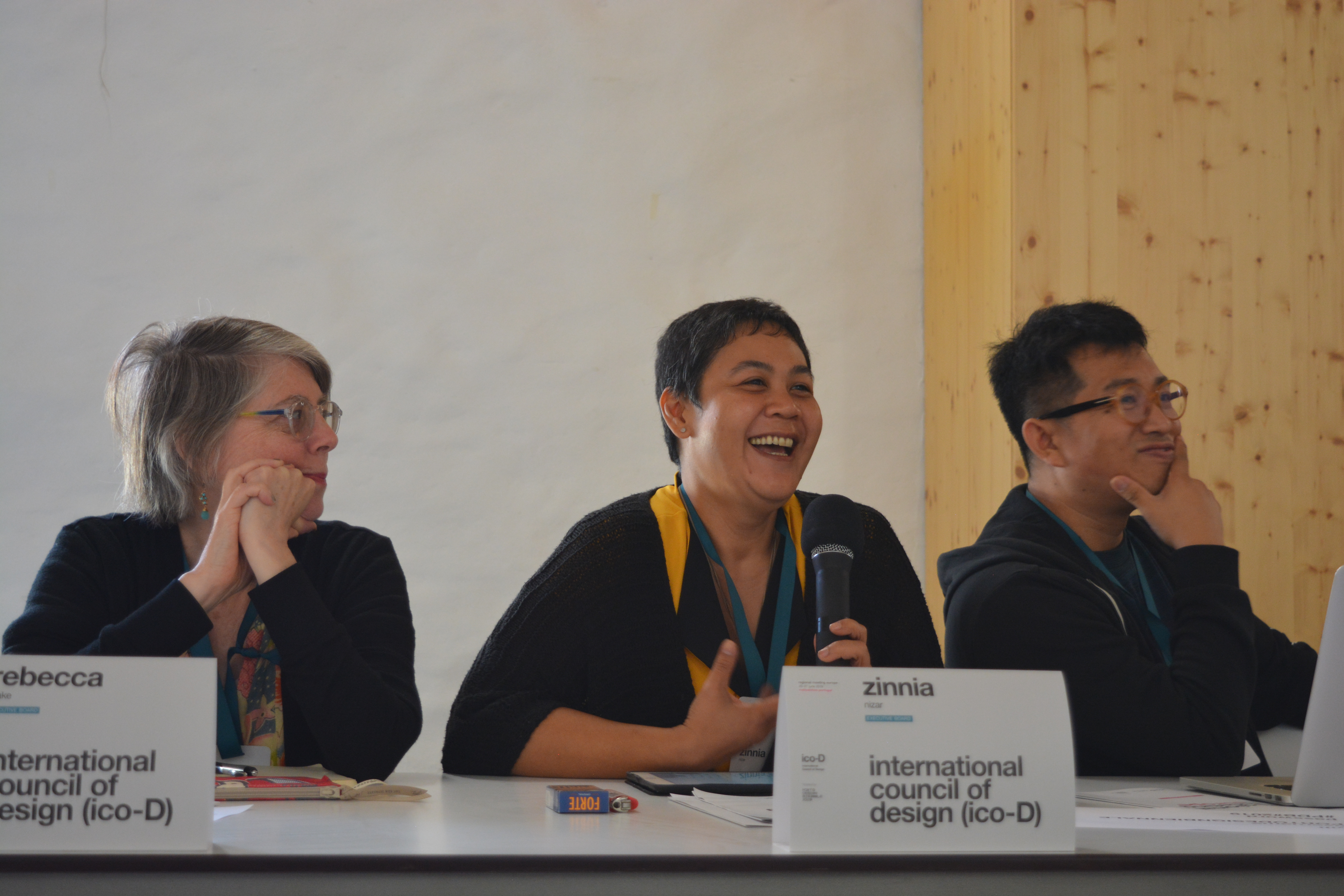
ICoD Regional Meeting 2019 Europe

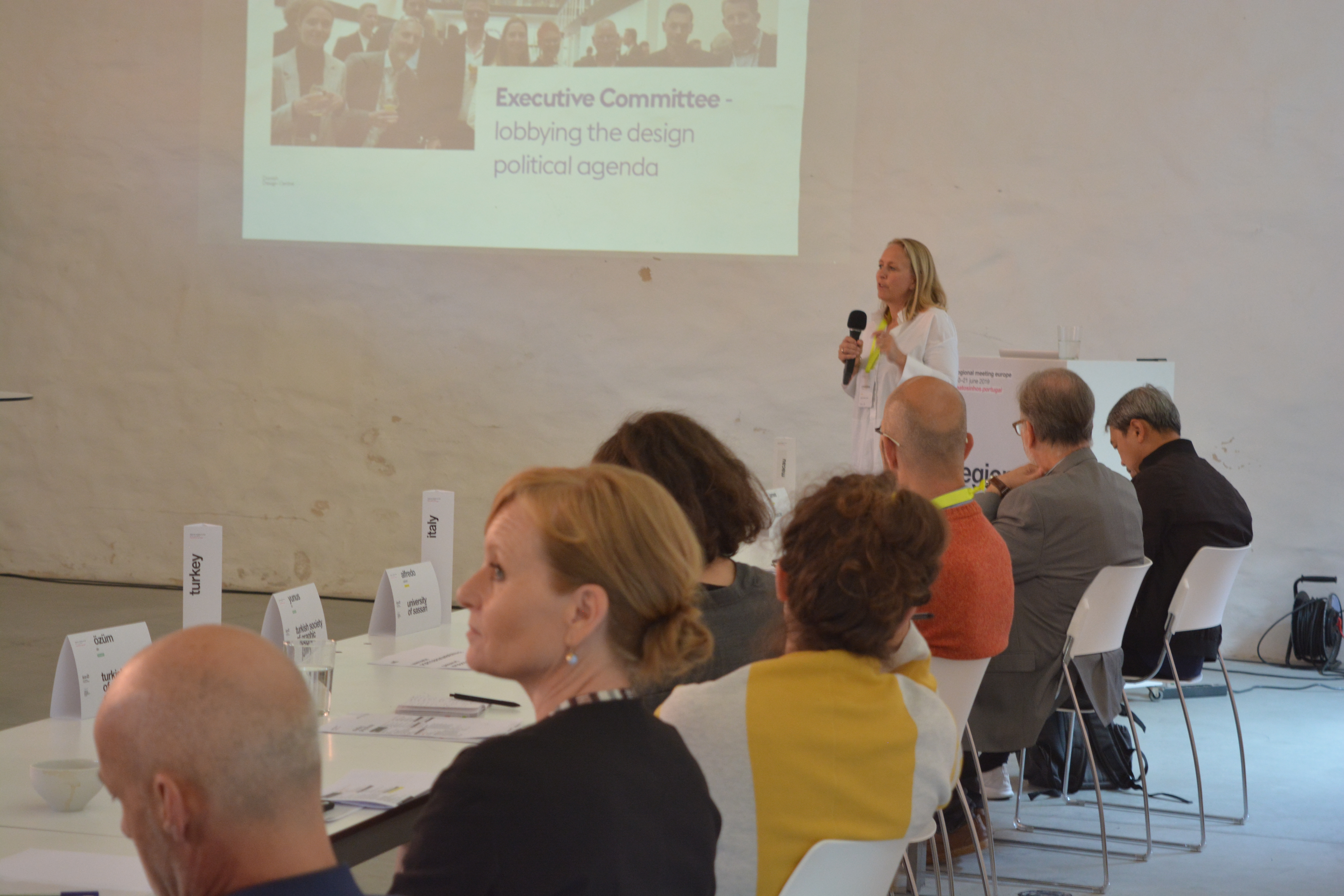
ICoD Regional Meeting 2019 Europe

== Professional design practice ==
The International Council of Design maintains that design is a profession. Like architects, doctors or lawyers, they advocate that designers have obligations and responsibilities that they must adhere to, to maintain their professional standing. The Council advocates that the title of "designer" implies adherence to a code of professional behaviour that ties their professional practice to obligations towards society at large.

The Council publishes a series of white papers, best-practice documents governing the professional conduct of the individual designer as well the organisation of design awards, design conferences and design exhibits. One of these is a code of conduct for professional designers.

=== Professional Code of Conduct ===
In 2020, the Council presented their updated Professional Code of Conduct for designers. The document positions design as a profession, focusing on ethical issues and the overarching responsibility of designers to humanity. The document has many features including a Lexicon of terms and detailed explanations of concepts relating to design, new technologies, intellectual property and professional practice. In 2021 an official translation to Spanish of this document was announced. Translated by Council Member RAD (Colombia), the translation process was supported by a review board composed of Universidad Iberoamericana (Mexico), Bolivia Poster Biennial BICeBé and Universidad de Monterrey (Mexico). The bilingual document contains a Spanish/English lexicon of terms and the entire document in parallel translation to easily access all explanations in both languages.

== Publications ==
Reflecting its origins as the International Council of Graphic Design Associations (Icograda), the Council has a long history of having publications. The earliest iteration of this is Icographic which was founded in 1971 and subsequent iterations include Iridescent and Communication Design.

=== Icographic ===
Founded by John Halas, and edited and designed by Patrick Wallis Burke, Icographic was a review of international visual communication published by Pergamon Press. The publication was quarterly at its inception and then became bi-annual. In its inaugural issue it was stated that the new magazine "intends to study this field [newsprint and publishing industries as well as television, cinema and computers] as well as examine the designer's role in it. It will attempt to serve as an organ expressing the designer's point of view in the new scene. It will attempt to reveal new ideas in the technical aspect of design and to become an essential information source in the area of visual communications to many of our members throughout the world."

There were 14 issues of Icographic printed between 1971 and 1978. The entire back-catalogue is available on the website of the Council.

=== Iridescent ===
Iridescent: Icograda Journal of Design Research, was the second iteration of the Council's design research journal. Coined the "prism on design research" the publication aimed to break boundaries and was. Initiated by Russell Kennedy (Icograda President 2009–2011), Edited by Omar Vulpinari (Icograda Vice President 2009-2011) and printed by Fabrica, this beautiful limited edition work includes papers by Elizabeth Tunstall, Lawrence Zeegan, Zhao Jian, and many more.

The journal existed in paper and digital form, running from 2009 to 2011. The entire back-catalogue is available on the website of the Council.

=== Communication Design ===
In 2016, the third iteration of the journal, Communication Design, Interdisciplinary and Graphic Design Research was launched. The initiative was led by Editor-in-chief Teal Triggs of the Royal College of Art and supported by an editorial team, including authors on design. The journal was published by Routledge/Taylor & Francis until 2019.

== International Design Day ==
The concept was developed in 1995 by Kim Paulsen (Vice President 1993–1995) to commemorate the foundation of the Council on 27 April 1963. The day initially known as "World Graphics Day" became "World Communication Design Day" in 2012, "World Design Day" in 2015, and "International Design Day" in 2020.

=== Themes ===
- 2015: How are you designing today?
- 2016: Design in Action!
- 2017: Start Young
- 2018: Kids can too!
- 2019: Women in design
- 2020: Be Professional!
- 2021: Design for each and all!
- 2022: Suspended in Transition
- 2023: Peace. Love. Design!
- 2024: Is it kind?
- 2025: Outlandish Optimism

== Secretariat ==
Initially based in London (United Kingdom), the Secretariat of the International Council of Design was in Brussels (Belgium) from 1999 to 2005, at which time it moved to Montréal (Canada), where it still resides.

The Secretariat office is where all the staff of the Council is based. The current team includes:

- Marnie Guglielmi-Vitullo, General Manager
- Yuzhu Hou, Administrator
- Alisha Piercy, Communications Officer
- Tara Farsky, Events Coordinator

=== Management ===
Mary Mullin was Secretary General from 1987 to 1999. In 1999 the position was officially changed to "Director" Thierry van Kerm held this during the period the Secretariat was based in Brussels from 1999 to 2005. In Montréal, Brenda Sanderson took over this role until 2012, followed by Marilena Farruggia until 2013, Jovana Milović until 2015 and Ana Masut until 2023. From 2023 onwards, management of the Secretariat has been in the hands of Marnie Guglielmi-Vitullo.

== Executive board ==
ICoD's executive board consists of individuals who are duly nominated and elected by ICoD's Member organisations at the biennial ICoD General Assembly. Members of the executive board serve in a volunteer position and donate their time and expertise to further Icograda's mandate. Board meetings are typically held four times a year in different locations around the world, usually in conjunction with regional meetings, seminars or other scheduled design events.

=== Executive Board 2022−2024 ===
- Melike Tascioglu Vaughan (Turkey), President
- Ting Xu (China), Past President
- Jonas Liugaila (Lithuania), Treasurer
- Anssi Kähärä (Finland), Secretary General
- Qin Du (China), Board Member

== History ==
=== Founding ===
Peter Kneebone proposed the idea to establish an international organisation for graphic design and was involved in Icograda's founding. The Society of Industrial Artists (which changed its name in 1963 to the Society of Industrial Artists & Designers, and is now the Chartered Society of Designers, or CSD) set up a working group under the chairmanship of Willy de Majo, to promote the creation of an organisation to represent internationally the many professional graphic design associations throughout the world. No such organisation existed. The profession was rapidly growing in importance, and also attempting to clarify its identity and objectives. It was involved in increasingly complex social and technological situations. National associations were developing, but international dialogue and action were intermittent and uncoordinated. It was important to create links between the professional associations in all countries, and between the profession and the rest of the world.

The inaugural conference of Icograda (the International Council of Graphic Design Associations) took place at Watney House, London, from 26 to 28 April 1963, attended by delegates from 28 associations in 17 European countries. The meeting was chaired by H.K. Henrion and supported by Kneebone as secretary. On 27 April, the meeting agreed to formally establish Icograda. Proposals that were ratified include the development and drafts of a Code of Ethics and Professional Practice, a Code of Contract and Conditions of Engagement for Graphic Designers, Rules and Regulations for International Graphic Design Competitions, an International Directory of Organizations Concerned with Graphic Design and the publication of a News Bulletin.

The first Executive Board was elected at the meeting in London, composed of Willy de Majo (Great Britain, President), Wim H. Crouwel (The Netherlands, Secretary General), Martin Gavier (Sweden, Treasurer), Peter Hatch (Great Britain, Vice President), Hans Neuburg (Switzerland, Vice President), Jukka Pellinen (Finland, Vice President), D. Stojannovic-Sip (Yugoslavia, Vice President), John Tandy (Great Britain, Member), Pieter Brattinga (The Netherlands, Member) and Paul Schwarz (The Netherlands, Honorary Treasurer). This Executive Board served from 1963 to 1966.

At the same meeting, the first Icograda Congress and General Assembly in 1964 in Zurich was called in order to establish the aims and structures upon which the future of the organisation rested.

=== 1960s ===
The first Icograda Congress and General Assembly took place in 1964 in Zurich. It was attended by about 200 designers from 17 countries and 23 associations. The theme of the Congress was Commercial Artist or Graphic Designer". The Congress opened with the reading of a message by Prince Philip, Duke of Edinburgh who wrote: "Every day designers of all kinds are becoming responsible for a greater proportion of man's environment. Almost everything that we see and use that was not made by the Almighty has come from some designer's drawing board. This is a very heavy responsibility and every effort by designers to improve standards, to encourage proper training and to develop a sense of social awareness is to be welcomed." At the General Assembly, delegates discussed Icograda's aims and objectives, and it was further agreed to establish an audio-visual archive and library, to publish a news bulletin and to award student scholarships. Ernest Hoch's proposals for a unified system of typographic measurement was accepted for further development.

In 1965 Icograda establishes the Signs and Symbols Commission. It first collaborates closely with the International Chamber of Commerce and then with the International Organization for Standardization (ISO). In the same year Icograda publishes Graphic journalism: Catalogue of Magazines and Annuals of Graphic Design and Allied Subjects featuring around 300 journals from 30 countries.

In April 1966 the first Icograda International Student Project was judged in Belgrade. The theme was 'Public information signs' and the jury included Abram Games, Josef Müller-Brockmann, Paul Rand, Masaru Katzumie and Ivan Picelj. The second Icogarada Congress, 'Graphic Design and Visual Communication Technology', and General Assembly were then held from 11 to 16 July 1966 in Bled, then in Yugoslavia. R Buckminster Fuller was one of the main speakers at the Congress. At the General Assembly, four key policy documents were ratified: Rules and Regulations for International Graphic Design Competitions, the Honorarium for Judges of International Competitions document and the revised Code of Ethics and Professional Practice, and the Code of Contract and Conditions of Engagement for Graphic Designers. Knut Yran, head of design at Phillips in Eindhoven, was elected president and Pieter Brattinga from the Netherlands, Secretary-General. The first student seminar was also held in Bled from 11 to 13 July 1966 and the theme was 'Breaking the Language Barrier with Signs and Symbols'. In addition, the production of Equality of Man, a film project for students and young people in support of the United Nations Human Rights Year, was the first of several Icograda collaborations with the International Animated Film Association (ASIFA).

The third Icograda Congress 'Design Destinations in a Changing World' was held in 1968 in Eindhoven. An exhibition of Belgian graphics was organised by Michel Olyff at the same time and the entire congress decamped to Brussels for a day. "Sachez que tout en ce monde n'est que signes et signes de signes" (Know that all in the world is only signs and signs of signs), were the words of Marcel Schwab quoted by Alderman van der Harten in opening the congress. Der Harten went on to make observations about communication, information systems, symbols, codes and signals, "but away from the congress there were different signs that could not be ignored."

The 1968 Congress coincided with the end of the Prague Spring. As the tanks rolled into Czechoslovakia the congress paused in a moment of silent respect. As the crisis deepened over the next few days Netherlanders offered hospitality to those wishing to stay on in the country for a few days, and many of the delegates marched, protested and petitioned their embassies as military repression threatened the freedoms of friends and colleagues. Whilst the SIAD had facilitated the inaugural meeting in London five years before, it must be remembered that most of the founders of Icograda were central Europeans, an assortment of Yugoslav, Austrian, German, Polish and Hungarian political émigrés who had made their home in the UK to escape persecution. The response of the Congress was therefore only to be expected. Presentations from Teunissen van Manen, Richard Gregory, Benno Wissing, Jerome Gould, and Massimo Vignelli, were thus overshadowed by political events.

At the 3rd Icograda General Assembly FHK Henrion was elected president and Pieter Brattinga re-elected Secretary-General. In addition, the book ICOGRADA The First Five Years by Wynkyn de Worde, was published and Icograda was commissioned by UNESCO to produce their first series of slides on graphic design.

=== 1970s ===
In 1971 the fourth General Assembly was held in Vienna, John Halas was elected president, and Marijke Singer Secretary-General. The newly established President's Trophy was awarded to Peter Kneebone. In 1970, the congress and exhibition "The Visual Communicator and the Learning Industry" took place in Vienna. Despite a raft of excellent speakers, there was considerable dissatisfaction with the way in which the event had been organised, in particular the commercial nature of the exhibition, and the congress effectively turned on itself for half a day with an open discussion about how matters should be arranged in the future. Memorably Herb Rohn from Carbondale, Illinois, standing on a table, demanded metaphorically that "the windows of the Hofburg be thrown open to let some fresh air into this place where there has been none this week."

The first issue of icographic, Icograda's biannual magazine, was published in 1971. Founded by John Halas, it was edited by Patrick Burke. The complete ten-year cycle was tapped out on an IBM Selectric typewriter, with many idiosyncratic but significant design issues being presented to a widening design audience.

In 1972 Icograda achieved consultative status with UNESCO in Paris. The fifth General Assembly and the Symposium 'Towards a Working Congress on Education' were held in London. Kurt Weidemann was elected president, Marijke Singer Secretary-General, and the President's Trophy was awarded to Patrick Wallis Burke.

In 1973 the first Icograda Student Seminar was held in London, chaired by FHK Henrion. The London seminars were a regular feature of the design calendar until 1999. After Henrion died in 1990, the event was chaired by Alan Fletcher, and for its final three years by Mervyn Kurlansky.

In 1974 the sixth Icograda General Assembly took place in Krefeld, Germany. Walter Jungkind was elected Icograda President, the first non-European resident to hold the office. He was also the first whose main career was in design education. Marijke Singer was again elected Secretary-General and Ernest Hoch won the President's Trophy. The assembly was followed by the 'Edugra' Congress held in Neuss, across the Rhine from Düsseldorf. The theme was 'Graphic Design Education'.

In 1975 the Icograda Edugraphic '75 International Conference was held in Edmonton with the theme 'Education for Graphic Design/Graphic Design for Education'. In 1976 a symposium 'Design for Need', jointly sponsored by Icograda and ICSID was held at the Royal College of Art in London. Following a study undertaken for UNESCO, an Icograda travelling exhibition 'The Image of Women in Advertising' opened in Eindhoven.

The 1977 Zurich Congress − 'Graphic Design for Social Communication' − was complemented by an entire issue of Graphis magazine devoted to the Congress exhibition held at the Kunstgewerbe Museum Zurich. Reflecting the closeness of the international design associations, one of the keynote speakers was Kenji Ekuan, President of the International Council of Societies of Industrial Design (Icsid, now the World Design Organization). The congress was followed by a seminar in Lausanne − 'A Town and its Image' − and the General Assembly at which Flemming Ljorring was elected president and Peter Kneebone Secretary-General. The President's Trophy was awarded to Kenneth and Shelagh Adshead for their work on the audio-visual archive.

In 1978 Icograda met at Evanston outside Chicago for the 'Design that Works' congress devoted to design evaluation; how designers could prove the commercial and social value of what they did. Speakers included Josef Müller-Brockmann, Milton Glaser and Massimo Vignelli. The eighth general assembly took place the following year in Paris at the Centre Pompidou. Peter Kneebone was elected president, Keith Murgatroyd Secretary-General and Bob Vogele was awarded the President's Trophy for his work organising the event in Chicago. The assembly was preceded by a seminar − 'Is Graphic Design a Reflection of Society or a Factor in its Evolution?'

=== 1980s ===
In 1980, Mauro Kunst organised the first Icograda Latin American conference in Guadalajara, Mexico. In the same year, World design sources directory 1980 = Répertoire des sources d'information en design 1980, edited by Centre de Creation Industrielle, was published on behalf of Icograda and Icsid.

The first Joint Congress of the "three sisters" Icograda, Icsid and the International Federation of Interior Architects/ Designers (IFI) took place in Helsinki from 1–8 August 1981, an event that had been under discussion since 1977. The theme was 'Design Integration'. Three separate general assemblies followed the congress. At the 9th Icograda General Assembly, Stig Hogdal was elected president, Marijke Singer was once again elected Secretary-General and the President's Trophy was awarded to Geoffrey Bensusan for his work on the Icograda News Bulletin. The first Icograda-Philips design award was awarded to Benoit de Pierrepont and S S Satie focusing on the theme The design of instructions and warnings, and the related problems of society in any area of human activity. Also in 1981, Icograda organised a poster competition on behalf of UNESCO to celebrate the International Year of Disabled Persons.

In 1982 the first of six issues of icographic/volume 2 was published on behalf of Icograda by Mobilia Press, with Jorge Frascara as associate editor. Each issue was devoted to a single theme and abstracts were included in four languages. Also in 1982, Haig David-West organised the first African regional meeting in Port Harcourt, Nigeria and in 1983, Haig David-West (the first ever elected Icograda Executive board member from Africa) edited the publication Dialogue on graphic design problems in Africa, based on this meeting.

In 1983 the 10th General Assembly and Icograda Congress Design Interaction were held in Dublin. The keynote address was given by Erskine Childers of the United Nations. In one of the most remarkable addresses ever made to an Icograda congress, Childers mixed thousands of years of history with personal experience as he set out examples where "I can tell you that again and again down the years I have confronted communication needs for which graphic visuals were indispensable – the only answer". Setting out a powerful argument for the potential of creating "rapid economic and social development through a major effort in endogenously researched and programmed use of the visual media leading to – but in that order – literacy" he called on the delegates to "offer and apply your centuries-evolved skills and sensitivities to help humanity see – literally see – both its marvelous capacity for progress and its primeval capacity for error, inhumanity, social neglect, even apocalyptic destruction". Admitting that he was presenting the delegates with challenges that were 'especially heavy' Childers said "I never knew a good graphic designer who did not explode with creativity and blossom when faced with an ostensibly impossible task... History will once again make its awesome judgement of you – but from now on with greater respect because you cannot any longer be underestimated. You help all of us perceive and place ourselves in life. Now you must help all of us understand so that we can more wisely and assuredly manage all our futures". Raymond Kyne was elected President and Robert Blaich won the President's Award for his promotion of Icograda-Philips design award. The number of member organisations had grown to 50. A multidisciplinary design competition on the theme of Shu/Collectivity, held under the auspices of Icograda, Icsid and IFI, and sponsored by the Japan Design Foundation, was won by Charles Owen from the Illinois Institute of Technology.

In 1985, the 11th Icograda Congress The place and influence of graphic design in everyday life was organised by Philippe Gentil in Nice, the first time that there were major presentations from India ('design without designers' by people whose needs were too urgent to await intervention by professionals) and Australia (from boomerang to bicentenary); from the design of books in China to street signs in Buenos Aires, and provocatively 'the backside of design' – what happens after the consultant has moved on to new, more rewarding problems. At the 11th Icograda General Assembly (also in Nice) Jorge Frascara was elected president. The President's Trophy went to Jan Railich, the chairman of the Brno Biennale. Also in 1985, the World Directory of Design Schools and Programmes was published jointly by Icograda, Icsid and IFI, and edited by Maarten Regouin, secretary of the Icograda Education Working Group, which also coincided with Icograda's establishment of the Design History and Design Management working groups chaired by Michael Twyman and Abe Rosenfeld respectively.

In 1986 Icograda Excellence Awards were made for the first time at the Brno and Warsaw Biennales. The recipients were Christof Gassner and Henryk Tomaszewski.

In 1987, Amrik Kalsi, Jorge Frascara and Peter Kneebone organised the Graphic Design for Development Seminar on behalf of Icograda and UNESCO. It was hosted in Nairobi, Kenya, from 6–10 July and attracted 91 participants from 14 countries.

The 2nd Joint Congress of Icograda, Icsid, IFI Design 87 − with as its theme 'Design Response' − was held in Amsterdam from 16 to 20 August 1987. At the 12th Icograda General Assembly which took place from 21 to 22 August (also in Amsterdam), Niko Spelbrink was elected president and Mary V. Mullin became Secretary-General (and Director of the Icograda Secretariat – a position she held until 1999). Susumu Sakane was awarded the President's Trophy. Uwe Loesch won the first Icograda Excellence Award to be presented at the Lahti Biennale. Icograda published the History of Design Bibliography edited by Victor Margolin, and Projects in Graphic Design Education edited by Jorge Frascara.

In 1988, Nils Tvengsberg organised a special event in Oslo, from 13 to 15 May, to mark the 25th anniversary of Icograda. All 11 presidents from 1963-onwards attended together with many former board members, partners, friends and supporters. Nils Tvengsberg was the first person to serve on the boards of both Icograda and Icsid simultaneously. His goal was to look at the possibility of joining their common interests. It would be over 20 years before this partnership, the International Design Alliance (IDA), would be headquartered in Montreal, contemplating the first IDA joint congress in 2011.

In 1989 the 13th Congress took place at Tel Aviv University, chaired by Abe Rosenfeld. The theme was 'Graphic Design Through High Technology?' At the General Assembly Simon de Hartog won the President's Award, and Helmut Langer became president.

=== 1990s ===
In 1990, Graphic Design, World Views. A celebration of ICOGRADA's 25th Anniversary, edited by Jorge Frascara, designed by Niko Spelbrink, and with a cover designed by Grapus, was published jointly by Icograda and Kodansha, a major book on graphic design that celebrated Icograda's 25th anniversary.

The Icograda Foundation was established in 1991 for the advancement of worldwide understanding and education through the effective use of graphic design. A limited company, the Foundation was a registered charity funded by corporate sponsorships, individual donations, legacies, and various fundraising activities. Mary Mullin received the President's Award for her work in establishing the Foundation.

In 1991 the 14th Icograda Congress and General Assembly took place in Montréal, from 25 to 29 August, attended by around 2,000 delegates. At the Icograda General Assembly (30–31 August 1991), Giancarlo Iliprandi was elected president. Highlights of the Assembly included: the hosting of the 3rd Marijke Singer Memorial Lecture presented by Margaret Catley Carlson, entitled Images for the Next Century; the Icograda President's Award was bestowed on Mary V. Mullin for the inauguration of the Icograda Foundation and the Friends of Icograda; establishment of the Icograda World Graphic Design Day; establishment of Icograda Steering Committee for the International Design Archive and Research Centre Project; and the establishment of Icograda Friends with seed donations contributed by 68 Japanese founders, chaired by Hiroshi Kojitani. In the same year, the first Icograda/IFI/Icsid Joint Newsletter was published.

In 1993 the 3rd Joint Congress of Icograda, Icsid and IFI was held in Glasgow, Ireland from 5–9 September. Stephen Hitchins chaired the organising committee and there were 101 speakers and over 1,000 delegates. Rick Poynor writing in Creative Review in 2007, said it had been "the most sophisticated and future-orientated discussion of design in the UK for 15 years". Jeremy Myerson called it "a watershed event, one of those rare occasions when the design community comes together and presses the pause button, and stops to reflect on what designers do, how things have changed, and where design practice could go in the future... It explored the limits of design. Victor Papanek was quoted in discussion Charles Rennie Mackintosh, who said, 'there is hope in honest error, none in icy perfection'.

As with all Icograda events, it was an invigorating experience, and it swam out into some uncharted waters. At the 15th General Assembly held in Glasgow immediately after the Congress, Philippe Gentil was elected president. Hiroshi Kojitani received the President's Award for his work in establishing Friends of Icograda.

From 23 to 27 July 1995, the 16th Icograda Congress took place in Lisbon, Portugal, followed by the General Assembly in Porto. The theme of the Congress was Shifting Frontiers. At the 16th Icograda General Assembly, Jose Korn Bruzzone from Chile became president and the Icograda President's Award was presented to Marion Wesel-Henrion and J. Brian Davies, jointly awarded for outstanding work for the Icograda Foundation and the organisation of the Poster Auction. Icograda hosted the International Poster Auction managed by Sotheby's London in May 1996.

In 1996, Icograda released a policy document Digital Immortality: Encapsulating the Work of the World's Top 20th Century Designers for an Icograda Archive in digital form aimed to establish a comprehensive archive for Icograda and the work of leading graphic design masters. In the same year, Icograda participated in a meeting of the Icograda/Icsid/IFI working group founded to develop closer working relations between the three organisations which took place from 7–8 December in Copenhagen, Denmark.

The 17th Icograda Congress and General Assembly took place from 21 to 23 October in Punte del Este, Uruguay. This was the first Icograda Congress to be hosted in the Southern Hemisphere and attracted ±1 000 delegates. The Congress theme was 'INTERCAMBIOS/EXCHANGES'. At this General Assembly in Punte del Este, the Icograda Assembly joined the Icsid and IFI General Assemblies to unanimously pass a resolution which called for closer contact between the "three sisters," paving the path towards the formation of the International Design Alliance (IDA), which was eventually established in 2005 and then disbanded in 2013. Guy-A Schockaert from Belgium became president and Mary V. Mullin was again elected Secretary General.

In early 1999, Mary V. Mullin resigned as the Icograda Secretary General and Director of the Icograda Secretariat after serving 12 years in the position. The Secretariat relocated from London to Brussels under the new leadership of Thierry van Kerm who was appointed as Icograda Director in June of the same year.

Sydney Design 99: Viewpoints in Time, the 4th joint Icograda/Icsid/IFI Congress took place from 26 to 29 September in Sydney, Australia. Around 1 400 delegates from 45 countries attended the event. The 18th Icograda General Assembly followed immediately after the Congress, 30 September-1 October in Sydney. At the Assembly, David Grossman from Israel become president and Martha Bateman from South Africa was elected as Secretary General (Bateman was only the second person from Africa to serve on the Executive Board and the first to serve in a senior position). At this General Assembly the Council officially separated the positions of Secretary General and Director of the Secretariat (paid position) functions. In addition, the GA ratified a Joint motion of Icograda, Icsid and IFI to establish "Design for the World". The Icograda President's Award was presented to Federico Mayor, Director-General of UNESCO for the organisation's long track-record in supporting Icograda's activities.

=== 2000s ===
At the 17th Icograda General Assembly a motion was ratified to hold a special millennium congress in October 2000 in Seoul, South Korea. The theme was Oullim, meaning 'great harmony'. The event was attended by around 1,600 delegates and was also the first Icograda event to be webcast live on the Internet. The Congress also included the launch of the Icograda Education Manifesto 2000, which was published in 17 languages.

In 2001, Icograda held regional meetings in Zagreb, Croatia in April, and in La Habana, Cuba in June. The meeting in Cuba coincided with the establishment of a new series of seminars entitled Design Perspectives which attracted 335 delegates from 23 countries. In September 2001, the Continental Shift 2001: World Design Convergence Congress took place in Johannesburg, South Africa. This was the first time that Icograda hosted a congress in Africa and also the first joint Icograda/IFI Congress. The Congress opened on 11 September, only hours after the 9/11 terror attacks in the USA. At the 19th Icograda General Assembly (15–16 September, Johannesburg), Robert L. Peters (Canada) became president and Tiffany Turkington (South Africa) was elected Secretary General. One of the most important agenda items was the adoption of an Icograda/Icsid Joint Resolution to establish a joint committee to study institutionalised collaboration. In November of the same year, the first Icograda Design Week was held in Melbourne, Australia. The Design Week included a Design Perspectives seminar and Regional Meeting. The year also saw the publication of Masters of the 20th century design: Icograda Hall of Fame (1974-1999) (book and CD-ROM), edited and designed by Mervyn Kurlansky, published by Graphis Inc. The book provided an in-depth view of the Icograda Student Seminars which had been held annually in London from 1973 to 1999.

In March 2002, the Icograda Design Week took place in Vancouver, British Columbia, Canada and consisted of the Environs'002: Design Without Borders Design Perspectives seminar and a North American Regional Meeting. Smaller versions of the Design Perspectives seminar were also hosted in Victoria, Canada, as well as in Seattle, USA. The Icograda Design Week in Brno took place from 17 to 21 June in the Czech Republic. The event included Over the fence: Design in Central and Eastern Europe Design Perspectives seminar, a Regional Meeting attended by delegates from eight countries, the Identity/Integrity Icograda Conference, East Meets West, Icograda Student Workshop, a symposium and inauguration of the Icograda Education Network (IEN) and a workshop to conceptualise the formation of the International Design Media Network (IDMN). The Design Week was further preceded by a joint meeting of the boards of Icograda, Icsid and IFI, resulting in the conceptualisation of the International Design Alliance (IDA) and the Host City Project to establish a joint Icograda/Icsid Secretariat.

In September of the same year, the Icograda board embarked on a three-week visit to China and Taiwan where they presented a Design Perspectives seminar in Beijing, logo2002: Identity and Communication Conference, and met with various Chinese design stakeholders aiming to seed the formation of new professional associations. In addition Icograda presented the Branding and Innovalue seminar and an Asian Regional Meeting in Taipei, followed by a Design Education Symposium and Student Workshop in Kaohsiung, Taiwan. Furthermore, the Icograda, Icsid and IFI presidents met on several occasions in Hornbaek, Denmark, to develop a Joint Resolution aimed at establishing the International Design Alliance and launching the Host City Project to establish a joint Secretariat in one location.

The year's activities ended with the hosting of a Regional Meeting, and Graphic Design for Social Causes workshop co-hosted by Design for the World as well as a Design Perspectives Seminar in Barcelona, Spain which attracted delegates from 15 countries.

In January 2003 Icograda initiated two surveys focusing on Design for Social Causes and Members' interest and activity in sustainability issues. In March, the board visited India, where they met with various Indian design stakeholders in Mumbai to seed the formation of new associations, followed by further meetings and co-hosting the Brands-Identities-Graphics 2003, Icograda Design Perspective Seminar in Ahmedabad. The Icograda Education Network Conference and Assembly of Icograda Education Network was held June in Brighton, UK. These events coincided with the signing of an agreement to establish the Icograda Archive at the Design History Research Centre Archives at the University of Brighton, which resulted in 145.11 linear metres of official documentation and publications, including c. 1,500 posters and c. 800 books and journals being transferred to University of Brighton.

The VISUALOGUE: Icograda World Design Congress took place from 8–11 October 2003 in Nagoya, Japan, preceded by the Icograda Education Network Symposium. More than 80 speakers and around 3 700 delegates from 48 countries participated in these events. At the 20th Icograda General Assembly which followed the Congress (the first GA to be held in Asia), representatives from 57 members attended in addition to observers from 16 related organisations, with official membership increasing to 80 associations from 57 countries. The GA agenda included the ratification of the Icograda/Icsid Hornbaek Joint Resolution to establish the International Design Alliance (IDA), and the election of the 2003−2005 Icograda Board, the first in history to represent six continents. Mervyn Kurlansky became president but no candidate was nominated for the Secretary General position.

In January 2004 the Icograda Design Week in Istanbul was held in Turkey. The Week's programme included 6 Alfabe, Icograda Student Workshop, an IEN Symposium, Regional Meeting, Building Bridges: Icograda Design Conference, Design Perspectives Icograda Regional Design Seminar, as well as the launch of the Icograda Design Media Network (IDMN). This was followed by the Icograda Design Week in São Paulo, Brazil, in April of the same year. The Week's programme included The Language of the City Student Workshop, a Latin American Regional Meeting, Design in Latin America Regional Design Seminar, and the Fronteiras! Icograda Design Conference. In August, Icograda and Icsid hosted a Joint Board Meeting and evaluation of the final six bids for the Joint Secretariat in Essen, Germany. Montreal's bid was selected as most ambitious and beneficial, followed by a site visit by representatives of Icograda and Icsid in September to initiate the final negotiations regarding relocation of the two organisations' Secretariates to Montreal.

In January 2005, Icograda and Icsid signed a 10-year contract to relocate to a shared office in Montreal. After six years in Brussels, the Secretariat relocated to Montreal. In February, Thierry Van Kerm resigned and Brenda Sanderson was appointed as Icograda Director, officially moving into the new shared Secretariat in May. During the same time, ICSID and Icograda collaborate on the first international Women in Design exploratory study as well as on the Interdesign on Sustainable Rural Transport – Technology for Developing Countries, which was hosted in April in Rustenburg, South Africa. The book, Worldwide Identity: Inspired Design from Forty Countries, written and produced by Robert L. Peters, published by Rockport, was also published and INDIGO (International Indigenous Design Network) was conceptualised.

Era '05 was another major collaborative effort by Icograda, Icsid and IFI to stage a fifth Joint Congress. The theme for the main Congress was 'The Changing Role and Challenges of Design' which attracted participation by designers, business leaders, politicians, legal practitioners and social scientists. A milestone in the cooperative efforts between leading design organisations in Denmark, Norway, Sweden and Finland, Era 05 was built on the ideal that as a creative force, design and designers were integral in helping to address the challenges all faced and identifying solutions to cope with a rapidly changing and increasingly complex world. In September, Era '05 began with small-scale pre-congress events hosted in Oslo, Helsinki and Gothenburg. The main Congress took place in Copenhagen and featured 126 speakers from 27 countries and was attended by around 900 delegates. At the 21st Icograda General Assembly that followed, Jacques Lange (South Africa) became president and Lise Vejse Klint (Denmark) was elected Secretary General. The newly elected board was now the most geographically diverse in Icograda's history with members from South Africa, South Korea, Canada, Denmark, Lebanon, USA, Australia and Brazil. Craig Halgreen received the Icograda President's Award for supporting and sustaining Sappi's Ideas that Matter program.

In 2006, Icograda co-organised three Design Weeks. In January, So Tiny, So Many: Icograda Design Week in Hong Kong took place in China and consisted of a student workshop, an evening lecture series and a Regional Meeting. In July, Defining design on a changing planet: Icograda Design Week in Seattle, took place in the USA. The Week included a student workshop that focussed on the UN Millennium Development Goals (in collaboration with United Nations Department of Economic and Social Affairs' Programme on Youth, a North American Regional Meeting, an Icograda Design Perspectives seminar, Defining Design on Changing Planet: Icograda Conference, as well as the launch of the +design programme. The Icograda Design Week in South Africa took place in September in Pretoria and Johannesburg. It included the Design for Development Lekgotla (in collaboration with Icsid member SABS), the Icograda/think Conference 2006, and the IEN Colloquium on Virtual Design Archives. In May of the same year, the presidents of Icograda, Icsid and IFI met in Montreal for the signing of an IDA joint venture agreement between Icograda and ICSID, together with an agreement with IFI to host the 2011 Joint Congress under the banner of the IDA.

In 2007, Icograda launched the IDA World Design Survey Pilot Project which aimed to map design development in several global regions based on a standardised set of indicators. The project was developed with advisory support from UNESCO Centre for Statistics and UNCTAD. Icograda also hosted two major Design Weeks. Design Local: Stop at all stations, Icograda Design Week in Mumbai, India took place from 5–9 February and included a student workshop and international conference. Design/Culture: Icograda World Design Congress in La Habana was held in Cuba from 20 to 26 October. It included an education conference at which 119 papers were presented originating from 25 countries, as well as the Posters for Cultural Diversity international poster exhibition, organised in collaboration with Prografica and UNESCO. At the 22nd Icograda General Assembly that followed, Don Ryun Chang (South Korea) became president and Lise Vejse Klint (Denmark) was again elected Secretary General. Highlights from the GA included the ratification of update definition of the profession from 'Graphic Design' to 'Communication Design', approval of revisions to Regulations and best practice for organizing design awards competitions, the introduction of Icograda best practice statement on soliciting work from professional communication designers, substantial revisions to the Articles of Incorporation and Bylaws to include a 'one member one vote' system, and granting of voting rights to Education Members (excluding on professional practice issues), establishment of an IDA Taskforce to explore options for future development, launch of INDIGO (Indigenous Design Network) as part of an IDA portfolio led by Icograda. In addition, the Icograda Foundation Lecture was re-introduced on 25 October at Museo Nacional Bellas Artes, La Habana which included the presentation of the Icograda President's Award which went to Guy-A Schockaert for his tireless advocacy of professional design organisations and his commitment to Icograda, and the presentation of the first Icograda Education Award which was bestowed on Hazel Gamec from the Wanganui School of Design, New Zealand.

In 2008, Icograda again held two Design Weeks. Color Value, Icograda Design Week in Daegu, South Korea took place in July, and in October Multiverso: Icograda Design Week in Torino Italy. In the same year, Icograda conducted the first survey of European member organisations which was followed up by a more in-depth study in 2010.

The Mousharaka: Icograda Design Week in Doha, Qatar, was held from 28 February – 5 March 2009, and included an international conference, student exhibitions and a Regional Meeting. In October, the XIN: Icograda World Design Congress in Beijing took place China. This was the last dedicated Icograda Congress and was attended by 1,750 delegates from 48 countries. The Congress was followed by the Icograda Education Conference, 29–30 October, Beijing. At the 23rd Icograda General Assembly 125 delegates from 45 countries attended, making it the largest and most representative in Icograda's GA history. Highlights of the Assembly included the ratification of a resolution on Sustainable Practice of Communication Design, as well as the adoption of new Best Practice documents, Regulations and Best Practices for Design Exhibitions and Jury Guidelines and Guidelines for Organising Design Conferences. Russell Kennedy (Australia) became president and Grégoire Serikoff, (France) was elected Secretary General (he resigned in 2011). The Icograda President's Award went to Pan Gongkai for helping to redefine the direction of art and design education in China, as well as to Robert L. Peters for his many achievements as a board member and as a member of the founding executive of the International Design Alliance (IDA). The Icograda Education Award was awarded to Ahn Sang-Soo from Hongik University, South Korea.

=== 2010s ===
In the early 2010s, the Council partnered with Member organisations to host a series of Design Weeks:

- 2010 - Design Currency: Icograda Design Week in Vancouver, British Columbia, Canada
- 2010 - Straight to Business: Icograda Design Week in Madrid, Spain
- 2010 - Optimism: Icograda Design Week in Brisbane, Australia
- 2010 - Icograda Design Education Manifesto 10th Anniversary, Jinan, China
- 2011 - Spring: Icograda Design Week in Vilnius, Lithuania

In 2011, the inaugural IDA Congress replaced the biannual Icograda World Design Congress as well as the Joint Congresses of Icograda, ICSID and IFI which have taken place every six years since 1981. The first IDA Congress took place in Taipei with the theme Design at the Edges. The 24th Icograda General Assembly took place in Taipei from 27 to 28 October.

The Council celebrated its fiftieth anniversary in 2013. The 25th General Assembly (25GA) was held in Montréal, Canada, on 16-18 November where Members considered important proposals to make the Council better able to serve the international design community. Members voted to update the definition of the International Council of Design’s membership landscape and to change from a Communication Design organisation to a multidisciplinary organisation. Additionally, Internal Parallel Sessions were held as well as a session for Educational, Professional and Promotional Members which would lead to the "Platform Meetings" format, to be initiated the following year.

The Council's inaugural Educational Platform Meeting (PM2014) was held from 23-24 August 2014 in Hong Kong, hosted by Member organisation Hong Kong Design Institute (HKDI). The meeting included presentations, panel discussions and open forum discussions intended to develop the Council’s official International Design Education Agenda. That Agenda determined allocation of focus and resources to develop programmes and benefits to Council Members. The same year in New York, the Council's first Professional Platform Meeting (PM2014) was held on 25-26 October 2014 along with the first ever Annual General Meeting (AGM2014). General Meetings had been until this point bi-Annual General Assemblies. The meetings were hosted by AIGA and The New School's Parsons School of Design. At the Annual General Meeting, Members discussed the historically important name change for the Council, as mandated by the members at the 25GA, to reflect becoming multidisciplinary. Thus, in 2014, Icograda changed its name to the International Council of Design.

In 2015, the Council conducted an Open Forum in Johannesburg, South Africa, on 25 February. Members of the ICoD Executive Board gathered informally with the South African design community to better understand challenges, expectations and opportunities in the region. The Council's 26 General Assembly (26GA) was held on 22-23 October 2015 in Gwangju (South Korea) in tandem with the Eeum: "Design Connects" International Design Congress. The next year, the second Annual General Meeting (AGM2016) and Platform Meetings took place in Pasadena, California (United States) on 24–26 August 2016 along with hosted by Council Member ArtCenter College of Design. That year, feedback from Members from the South American design community revealed that they shared a lot more than just a common language: these design entities faced common challenges from developing education curricula for their regional job market, to working in the context of emerging economies with various levels of government support, to the challenges of smaller institutions to fund, collaborate and publish design-related research, and that collaboration could be fostered within the Council framework. From these conversations a plan developed to hold a Regional Meeting. This meeting, the Regional Meeting Latin America 2017 (RM LATAM 2017), was held at Estación Mapocho in Santiago (Chile) on 19-20 January 2017 and was hosted by Council Member Duoc UC and the Chile Design Biennal.

Since the first Icograda Congress in Beijing, China, in 2009, the Council had maintained strong ties with its Chinese Members. Active in roundtables, local events and partnering with Member organisations to plan meetings and even create programmes. In 2016 and 2017 then-President of the Council, David Grossman, piloted a Design Education Lab, partnering Council Member organisations in China and abroad for a student exchange programme geared to establish collaboration. The participating institutions Chengdu University of Technology (China), Shenkar College of Engineering and Design (Israel) and Ravensbourne University (United Kingdom) participated in an innovative format focusing on providing insight on transitioning from 'Original Equipment Manufacture to Original Brand Manufacture'.

For International Design Day, April 27 2017, the Council partnered with Montréal design studio RAP to create a workshop on design for children themed: Kids Can Too! With the premise that a more generalised awareness of design would benefit society, the half-day activity was a primer on design with some hands-on exercises to initiate youth participants into a basic understanding of design methodology. The workshop was translated and given by organisations around the world including Open Design Cape Town (South Africa); the Triennale di Milano (Italy), Casa Wabi (Mexico), the Seoul Design Foundation (South Korea), Design Exchange (Canada), MALBA (Museo de Arte Latinoamericano de Buenos Aires (Argentina), and Mumedi (Museo Mexicano del Diseño, Mexico).

In October of 2017, the Council held a series of meetings, culminating in the first ever World Design Summit in Montréal (Canada). The 2017 Platform Meeting was a two-day event held on 13–14 October 2017. Held under the theme Design is Global, the programme was designed to permit overlap between Professional, Promotional and Educational Members on topics including: Accreditation/Certification, Indigenous Design, Blueprints for Designers’ Lifelong Learning, National Design Policy and more. The Council's 27th General Assembly (27GA) was held on 15-16 October 2017. Finally, the Council held its first ever meeting of Design Weeks, Design Cities and Design Museums on 21 October 2017 at the Montreal Museum of Fine Arts. A pilot project targeting a small cross-section of non-Member organisations, this meeting brought together representatives of 15 entities from ten different countries.

On 24 October 2017, the Montréal Design Declaration was signed by eighteen international organisations, representing upwards of a million practitioners. The Montréal Design Declaration was an historic milestone for the international design community. For the first time, the international organisations representing designers, architects, planners and landscape architects came together to advocate for the potential of design to address important challenges facing humanity and issue a joint call to action. The Montréal Design Declaration recognises the unique value of design to address the complex problems of this century.

The following year, the Council's Annual General Meeting (AGM2018) took place in Beijing (China) on 19 September, in conjunction with the Platform Meeting, held on 18–20 September. These events were hosted by Member Central Academy of Fine Arts of China (CAFA) at the CAFA Campus in Beijing. The theme of the PM2018 was Design is Changing, an acknowledgement that our world is moving quickly and that our profession has a role to play in this change. The theme addressed how the future of design is becoming ever more difficult to predict acknowledging how the world surprises us every day with both dramatic changes and vast possibilities. Discussions revolved around the broad question: What if Design—perceptive in its understanding of the past, and prescient in its talent at re-imagining a better future—is in a unique position to offer a clear path through this shift?

The second meeting of Design Weeks, Design Cities and Design Museums was held at the Gehua New Century Hotel in Beijing (China) on 21-22 September 2018 in partnership with Beijing Design Week. The Meeting was held to coincide with the opening of Beijing Design Week—one of the world’s largest design weeks. The Meeting brought together representatives of 17 entities from 14 different countries, and was open to entities promoting and supporting design in their regions. In anticipation of a future Design Declaration Summit, a Pre-Summit Meeting was held in Saint-Étienne (France) on 03–05 April 2019, hosted by the Saint-Étienne Design Bienale. More than 40 organisations participated in sessions on metrics and collecting data, design policy and design education and research.

The third iteration of the meeting of Design Weeks, Design Cities and Design Museums was held on 10-11 May 2019 in Graz (Austria). The Graz meeting brought together 30 representatives of 17 entities from 13 different countries during Graz's Design Month (Designmonat Graz). The Council held a Regional Meeting of European Members (RM Europe 2019) on 20-21 June 2019 in Matosinhos (Portugal), hosted by the Porto Design Biennale organisation and the research arm of Portuguese University ESAD (esad-idea). The meeting acknowledged a shift in focus from Europe as a design leader, to a need for new standards in the face of new issues and technologies. The meeting covered five topics specific to the European context, including: Public design policy, Metrics + Data, Globalisation, Collaboration and the Design Agenda. The Council's 28th General Assembly (28GA) was held on 29 November 2019 in tandem with the ICoD Platform Meeting on 01 December 2019, at the Emily Carr University campus in Vancouver (Canada). The 2019 theme was Design is Professional. Council Members discussed Professional Standards, Collaboration, INDIGO (the Indigenous Design Network) and Design Ethics.

=== 2020s ===
In February of 2020, Member The African Institute of the Interior Design Professions (IID) invited the Council to participate in an event entitled Our Time is Now, held in Johannesburg (South Africa). ICoD met with local design representatives and participated in activities with regional designers to discuss design perspectives in Africa. A Board Meeting was held in Johannesburg, which would prove to be the last in-person meeting of the Council Executive as a global pandemic of severe acute respiratory syndrome (SARS-CoV-2) shut down world travel for many months. In August of 2020, the Council launched a revision of its Code of Conduct, the Professional Code of Conduct for designers, is presented as an international standard and reference. The document has a Lexicon of terms and detailed explanations of concepts relating to design, new technologies, intellectual property and professional practice. The new Code firmly positions design as a profession, focusing on ethical issues and the overarching responsibility of designers to humanity. The first official translation of this Code, into Spanish was published in 2021. In December 2021, the meeting of Design Weeks, Design Cities and Design Museums was named the Iridescent Network. Quoting from the publication of the same name: “all too often design is seen as a prettifying profession. Design’s iridescence may distract from the serious nature of its mission, which is to provide the world and its inhabitants with sensible, well made, sustainable and culturally meaningful products. The Iridescent Network, a ‘prismatic’ view on design, aims to bring together organisations that believe that design can make a fundamental difference in the lives of everyday people; that citizens of our cities can be better consumers of design if they are more educated about design and demand better, more sustainable, socially just, culturally interesting design. As a response to the global pandemic, the Council’s Meetings were moved into a virtual format from 2020 to 2022. In those two years, the Council held 24 virtual meetings on various topics from pandemic response to professional standards and the future of design.
